= 1996 Serbian local elections =

Local elections were held in Serbia over two rounds on 3 November and 17 November 1996, concurrently with the 1996 Vojvodina provincial election. The first day of voting also coincided with the 1996 Yugoslavian parliamentary election and the 1996 Montenegrin parliamentary election. This was the third local election cycle held while Serbia was a constituent member of the Federal Republic of Yugoslavia and the last time that Serbia oversaw local elections throughout Kosovo and Metohija until its controversial decision to hold elections in 2008.

Delegates to city and municipal assemblies were elected in single-member constituencies. If no candidate secured a majority in the first round of voting, a second round was held.

== Campaign and aftermath ==
The elections took place during the time of Slobodan Milošević's authoritarian rule as president of Serbia. In most major jurisdictions, Milošević's Socialist Party of Serbia (SPS) ran in an alliance with the Yugoslav Left (JUL) and New Democracy (ND).

The main opposition grouping was the Zajedno alliance, which was formed in September 1996 by the Democratic Party (DS), the Serbian Renewal Movement (SPO), and the Civic Alliance of Serbia (GSS). The Democratic Party of Serbia (DSS) participated in the Zajedno alliance in some jurisdictions, including Kragujevac, Pančevo, Smederevo, and Čačak, and contested other areas, such as Belgrade on its own. The far-right Serbian Radical Party (SRS) contested the election on its own, directing its attacks on both Milošević and Zajedno.

The election results were marked by weeks of controversy. Zajedno claimed success in several major jurisdictions, but in most instances the SPS did not accept defeat and the local election commissions (often controlled by allies of Milošević) refused to certify the opposition's victories. In Belgrade, the election commission invalidated the results in thirty-three constituencies won by Zajedno and called a third round of voting for 27 November. The Zajedno parties boycotted the third round, charging abuse of process. These events led to the 1996–1997 protests in Serbia, in which student and opposition groups held a series of non-violent street rallies against the Milošević regime.

Milošević and his allies held a counter-rally in Belgrade on 24 December 1996 that drew only sixty thousand attendees (many of whom had been brought in from rural areas) against three hundred thousand opposition protesters. Three days later, a delegation from the Organization for Security and Co-operation in Europe (OSCE) ruled that the opposition had indeed won several of the disputed elections, including in Belgrade, Niš, Pančevo, and Zrenjanin. The Serbian government began to soften its position, accepting the opposition's victory in Niš on 8 January 1997. The Belgrade election commission announced on 17 January that Zajedno had won the elections. The government initially refused to accept this ruling, but on 13 February (following police attacks on the opposition demonstrators that were condemned internationally) the Serbian parliament approved a lex specialis that affirmed almost all of the victories claimed by Zajedno. The protests wound down after this time, and the Zajedno coalition took power in Belgrade and several other cities.

Ultimately, the parties in Zajedno were not able to remain united at the republic level, and the coalition fell apart in Belgrade before the year was over. In some jurisdictions, including Novi Sad, the Zajedno parties were able to maintain their alliance until the next local election cycle in 2000.

== Results ==
Unless otherwise noted, vote totals and percentages refer to the results in the first round of voting.

=== Belgrade ===
Elections were held at the city level and in all of Belgrade's constituent municipalities. The Zajedno alliance won a majority victory in the city, as well as winning control of most municipal assemblies. The Socialists won a smaller number of victories, mostly in the city's outer suburbs, while the Radicals won control of Zemun.

==== City of Belgrade ====
Results of the election for the City Assembly of Belgrade:

Party	First round		Second round		Seats
Party	Votes	%	Votes	%	Seats
Socialist Party of Serbia and Yugoslav Left	256,841	33.91	212,677	44.28	24
Zajedno (Coalition Together)	198,740	26.24	219,019	45.60	67
Serbian Radical Party	143,429	18.94	40,020	8.33	17
Democratic Party of Serbia	75,145	9.92	8,588	1.79	2
New Democracy	18,430	2.43			–
Citizens' Group candidates	14,795	1.95			–
United Radical Party of Serbia	9,673	1.28			–
Democratic Party of Serbia and Serb People's Party	8,863	1.17			–
Democratic Centre	8,089	1.07			–
League of Communists of Yugoslavia	4,524	0.60			–
New Communist Party of Yugoslavia	3,234	0.43			–
Serb People's Party	2,852	0.38			–
Workers' Party of Yugoslavia	2,605	0.34			–
Parliamentary People's Party, People's Radical Party, and Serbian Saint Sava Party	2,287	0.30			–
Social Democratic Union	2,258	0.30			–
Serbian Radical Party "Nikola Pašić"	1,597	0.21			–
Universalist Movement of Serbia	1,483	0.20			–
Peasants Party of Serbia	657	0.09			–
Movement for the Protection of Citizens' Property Rights	482	0.06			–
Peasants Party	472	0.06			–
Serbian National Renewal	273	0.04			–
Fatherland Radical Party	261	0.03			–
Movement for the Protection of Human Rights	158	0.02			–
All-Serbian Union	128	0.02			–
Serbian Saint Sava Party	85	0.01			–
Total	757,361	100.00	480,304	100.00	110
Valid votes	757,361	94.77	480,304	96.21	
Invalid/blank votes	41,792	5.23	18,916	3.79	
Total votes	799,153	100.00	499,220	100.00	
Registered voters/turnout	1,287,280	62.08	1,239,695	40.27	

DS leader Zoran Đinđić was chosen as mayor on 21 February 1997, by a vote of sixty-eight to twenty-four among the city assembly's delegates. There were sixteen abstentions and one delegate was absent. Zajedno gained another seat shortly after the election, when DSS delegate Aleksandra Joksimović joined the DS.

The SPO left the Zajedno alliance later in the year. Đinđić was dismissed as mayor on 30 September 1997, via an SPO motion that was supported by the SPS and SRS. Sixty-seven of the sixty-eight delegates present voted for Đinđić 's dismissal; the other delegate abstained. The non-SPO members of Zajedno boycotted this sitting of the assembly on the grounds that it had been improperly constituted. Milan Božić of the SPO became the city's acting mayor after this time, and the SPO held all of the major positions in the city government with the informal support of the SPS and SRS. Božić was acting mayor for almost a year and a half before Vojislav Mihailović, also of the SPO, was voted to the position of mayor by the assembly in January 1999.

==== Municipalities of Belgrade ====
===== Barajevo =====
Results of the election for the Municipal Assembly of Barajevo:

Party	Votes	%	Seats
Socialist Party of Serbia	4,548	44.07	24
Zajedno (Coalition Together)	2,859	27.70	8
Serbian Radical Party	1,628	15.78	–
Yugoslav Left	1,031	9.99	1
Citizens' Group candidates	254	2.46	–
Total	10,320	100.00	33
Valid votes	10,320	98.16	
Invalid/blank votes	193	1.84	
Total votes	10,513	100.00	
Registered voters/turnout	17,429	60.32	

Milan Damnjanović of the Socialist Party was chosen as mayor after the election.

===== Čukarica =====
Results of the election for the Municipal Assembly of Čukarica:

Party	Votes	%	Seats
Socialist Party of Serbia	21,183	28.17	18
Zajedno (Coalition Together)	20,696	27.53	29
Serbian Radical Party	17,703	23.54	6
Yugoslav Left	7,668	10.20	–
Democratic Party of Serbia	5,641	7.50	–
New Democracy	1,213	1.61	–
Democratic Centre	724	0.96	–
Parliamentary People's Party	160	0.21	–
Citizens' Group candidates	84	0.11	–
Peasants Party of Serbia	61	0.08	–
United Radical Party of Serbia	56	0.07	–
Total	75,189	100.00	53
Valid votes	75,189	94.99	
Invalid/blank votes	3,966	5.01	
Total votes	79,155	100.00	
Registered voters/turnout	130,564	60.63	

Zoran Alimpić of the Democratic Party was chosen as mayor after the election.

===== Grocka =====
Results of the election for the Municipal Assembly of Grocka:

Party	Votes	%	Seats
Socialist Party of Serbia	9,952	39.81	28
Zajedno (Coalition Together)	8,959	35.84	7
Yugoslav Left	2,816	11.26	–
Serbian Radical Party	2,308	9.23	3
Citizens' Group candidates	937	3.75	–
Democratic Centre	26	0.10	–
Total	24,998	100.00	38
Valid votes	24,998	93.13	
Invalid/blank votes	1,845	6.87	
Total votes	26,843	100.00	
Registered voters/turnout	48,901	54.89	

Incumbent mayor Milan Janković of the Socialist Party was confirmed for another term in office after the election.

===== Lazarevac =====
Results of the election for the Municipal Assembly of Lazarevac:

Party	Votes	%	Seats
Socialist Party of Serbia	14,441	43.67	42
Zajedno (Coalition Together)	12,006	36.30	15
Yugoslav Left	3,550	10.73	1
Citizens' Group candidates	2,791	8.44	3
Serbian Radical Party	282	0.85	–
Total	33,070	100.00	61
Valid votes	33,070	95.24	
Invalid/blank votes	1,652	4.76	
Total votes	34,722	100.00	
Registered voters/turnout	44,094	78.75	

Živko Živković of the Socialist Party was chosen as mayor after the election.

===== Mladenovac =====
Results of the election for the Municipal Assembly of Mladenovac:

Party	Votes	%	Seats
Socialist Party of Serbia	9,595	40.07	24
Zajedno (Coalition Together)	9,399	39.26	27
Yugoslav Left	3,749	15.66	3
Serbian Radical Party	681	2.84	–
Citizens' Group candidates	154	0.64	1
League of Communists of Yugoslavia	148	0.62	–
Parliamentary People's Party	133	0.56	–
Serbian National Renewal	84	0.35	–
Total	23,943	100.00	55
Valid votes	23,943	91.66	
Invalid/blank votes	2,178	8.34	
Total votes	26,121	100.00	
Registered voters/turnout	41,577	62.83	

Predrag Čokić of the Serbian Renewal Movement was chosen as mayor after the election, by a vote of 28 to 27. This was one of two municipalities where the lex specialis did not recognize a victory claimed by Zajedno, although in this instance the coalition managed to form government in any event.

Shortly after the vote, three Zajedno representatives became independent (Citizens' Group) members, as did one representative from the Yugoslav Left. The Zajedno administration was unstable during this period, but it ultimately managed to remain in power for the full term.

===== New Belgrade =====
Results of the election for the Municipal Assembly of New Belgrade:

Party	Votes	%	Seats
Zajedno (Coalition Together)	36,590	31.54	21
Socialist Party of Serbia	34,004	29.31	28
Serbian Radical Party	26,137	22.53	6
Yugoslav Left	14,858	12.81	–
New Democracy	3,073	2.65	–
Citizens' Group candidates	352	0.30	–
United Radical Party of Serbia	197	0.17	–
Parliamentary People's Party	179	0.15	–
Workers' Party of Yugoslavia	169	0.15	–
Social Democratic Union	139	0.12	–
Progressive Party	116	0.10	–
Workers' Party of Serbia	115	0.10	–
League of Communists of Yugoslavia	78	0.07	–
Total	116,007	100.00	55
Valid votes	116,007	95.36	
Invalid/blank votes	5,644	4.64	
Total votes	121,651	100.00	
Registered voters/turnout	186,799	65.12	

Incumbent mayor Čedomir Ždrnja of the Socialist Party was confirmed for another term in office after the election. This was one of two municipalities where the lex specialis did not recognize a victory claimed by Zajedno.

===== Obrenovac =====
Results of the election for the Municipal Assembly of Obrenovac:

Party	Votes	%	Seats
Zajedno (Coalition Together)	10,718	33.84	27
Socialist Party of Serbia	10,178	32.13	19
Yugoslav Left	5,943	18.76	8
Serbian Radical Party	4,024	12.70	1
Citizens' Group candidates	535	1.69	–
Peasants Party of Serbia	127	0.40	–
League of Communists of Yugoslavia	101	0.32	–
Workers' Party of Serbia	47	0.15	–
Total	31,673	100.00	55
Valid votes	31,673	93.28	
Invalid/blank votes	2,280	6.72	
Total votes	33,953	100.00	
Registered voters/turnout	53,368	63.62	

There were difficulties in establishing a local government after the election.

===== Palilula =====
Results of the election for the Municipal Assembly of Palilula:

Party	Votes	%	Seats
Socialist Party of Serbia	19,751	27.97	14
Zajedno (Coalition Together)	18,094	25.63	29
Serbian Radical Party	16,258	23.03	8
Yugoslav Left	7,542	10.68	–
Democratic Party of Serbia	5,505	7.80	3
Citizens' Group candidates	1,337	1.89	1
Coalition: Parliamentary Opposition	590	0.84	–
United Radical Party of Serbia	565	0.80	–
Workers' Party of Yugoslavia	205	0.29	–
League of Communists of Yugoslavia	178	0.25	–
New Democracy	167	0.24	–
Fatherland Radical Party	95	0.13	–
Democratic Centre	94	0.13	–
Universalist Movement of Serbia	82	0.12	–
Peasants Party of Serbia	75	0.11	–
Social Democratic Union	70	0.10	–
Total	70,608	100.00	55
Valid votes	70,608	94.89	
Invalid/blank votes	3,801	5.11	
Total votes	74,409	100.00	
Registered voters/turnout	121,537	61.22	

Gordana Todić of the Democratic Party was chosen as mayor after the election.

===== Rakovica =====
Results of the election for the Municipal Assembly of Rakovica:

Party	Votes	%	Seats
Zajedno (Coalition Together)	14,443	29.88	32
Socialist Party of Serbia	13,361	27.64	6
Serbian Radical Party	11,577	23.95	12
Yugoslav Left	5,411	11.19	–
Democratic Party of Serbia	2,347	4.86	–
Serbian Radical Party "Nikola Pašić"	313	0.65	–
Parliamentary People's Party	235	0.49	–
United Radical Party of Serbia	185	0.38	–
Democratic Centre	177	0.37	–
League of Communists of Yugoslavia	137	0.28	–
Citizens' Group candidates	109	0.23	–
People's Radical Party	42	0.09	–
Total	48,337	100.00	50
Valid votes	48,337	93.77	
Invalid/blank votes	3,210	6.23	
Total votes	51,547	100.00	
Registered voters/turnout	83,980	61.38	

Predrag Dokmanović of the Serbian Renewal Movement was chosen as mayor after the election.

===== Savski Venac =====
Results of the election for the Municipal Assembly of Savski Venac:

Party	Votes	%	Seats
Zajedno (Coalition Together)	7,304	29.11	25
Socialist Party of Serbia	6,987	27.84	7
Serbian Radical Party	3,740	14.90	1
Yugoslav Left	2,969	11.83	–
Democratic Party of Serbia	2,778	11.07	2
Citizens' Group candidates	916	3.65	2
Parliamentary People's Party	195	0.78	–
Progressive Party	119	0.47	–
Social Democratic Union	66	0.26	–
Liberal Party (Liberalna stranka)	20	0.08	–
Total	25,094	100.00	37
Valid votes	25,094	95.95	
Invalid/blank votes	1,058	4.05	
Total votes	26,152	100.00	
Registered voters/turnout	39,493	66.22	

Zdravko Krstić of the Serbian Renewal Movement was chosen as mayor after the election.

===== Sopot =====
Results of the election for the Municipal Assembly of Sopot:

Party	Votes	%	Seats
Socialist Party of Serbia	4,727	51.22	29
Zajedno (Coalition Together)	3,010	32.62	4
Yugoslav Left	1,002	10.86	–
New Democracy	381	4.13	–
Citizens' Group candidates	108	1.17	–
Total	9,228	100.00	33
Valid votes	9,228	93.04	
Invalid/blank votes	690	6.96	
Total votes	9,918	100.00	
Registered voters/turnout	16,219	61.15	

Incumbent mayor Živorad Milosavljević of the Socialist Party was confirmed for another term in office after the election.

===== Stari Grad =====
Results of the election for the Municipal Assembly of Stari Grad:

Party	Votes	%	Seats
Zajedno (Coalition Together)	10,953	30.25	38
Socialist Party of Serbia	9,350	25.82	–
Democratic Party of Serbia	9,143	25.25	18
Serbian Radical Party	3,177	8.77	–
Yugoslav Left	2,493	6.88	–
Citizens' Group candidates	615	1.70	–
Parliamentary People's Party	329	0.91	–
New Democracy	117	0.32	–
Universalist Movement of Serbia	20	0.06	–
United Radical Party of Serbia	13	0.04	–
Total	36,210	100.00	56
Valid votes	36,210	95.40	
Invalid/blank votes	1,745	4.60	
Total votes	37,955	100.00	
Registered voters/turnout	59,669	63.61	

Incumbent mayor Jovan Kažić of the Serbian Renewal Movement was confirmed for another term in office after the election.

===== Voždovac =====
Results of the election for the Municipal Assembly of Voždovac:

Party	Votes	%	Seats
Zajedno (Coalition Together)	21,631	29.57	39
Socialist Party of Serbia	18,701	25.57	10
Serbian Radical Party	14,411	19.70	5
Yugoslav Left	8,807	12.04	2
Democratic Party of Serbia and Parliamentary People's Party	8,363	11.43	–
New Democracy	490	0.67	–
Democratic Centre	316	0.43	–
Citizens' Group candidates	187	0.26	–
Universalist Movement of Serbia	86	0.12	–
Serbian Saint Sava Party	67	0.09	–
Social Democratic Union	60	0.08	–
Liberal Party (Liberalna stranka)	22	0.03	–
Total	73,141	100.00	56
Valid votes	73,141	94.69	
Invalid/blank votes	4,104	5.31	
Total votes	77,245	100.00	
Registered voters/turnout	131,602	58.70	

Nebojša Atanacković of the Serbian Renewal Movement was chosen as mayor after the election.

===== Vračar =====
Results of the election for the Municipal Assembly of Vračar:

Party	Votes	%	Seats
Zajedno (Coalition Together)	15,973	42.86	50
Socialist Party of Serbia	9,323	25.01	–
Democratic Party of Serbia	5,724	15.36	10
Yugoslav Left	3,629	9.74	–
Serbian Radical Party	1,872	5.02	–
New Democracy	238	0.64	–
Citizens' Group candidates	207	0.56	–
Democratic Centre	130	0.35	–
Workers' Party of Yugoslavia	45	0.12	–
United Radical Party of Serbia	42	0.11	–
Serbian Saint Sava Party	31	0.08	–
Parliamentary People's Party	30	0.08	–
Social Democratic Union	27	0.07	–
Total	37,271	100.00	60
Valid votes	37,271	95.35	
Invalid/blank votes	1,819	4.65	
Total votes	39,090	100.00	
Registered voters/turnout	62,061	62.99	

Milena Milošević of the Democratic Party was chosen as mayor after the election.

===== Zemun =====
Results of the election for the Municipal Assembly of Zemun:

Party	Votes	%	Seats
Serbian Radical Party	24,531	29.67	33
Zajedno (Coalition Together)	20,457	24.75	14
Socialist Party of Serbia	20,395	24.67	6
Yugoslav Left	11,270	13.63	1
Democratic Party of Serbia	3,355	4.06	1
New Democracy	1,060	1.28	–
Citizens' Group candidates	735	0.89	–
United Radical Party of Serbia	370	0.45	–
Workers' Party of Yugoslavia	201	0.24	–
Social Democratic Union	156	0.19	–
Serbian Saint Sava Party	61	0.07	–
Parliamentary People's Party	36	0.04	–
Serbian National Renewal	34	0.04	–
Workers' Party of Serbia	8	0.01	–
Total	82,669	100.00	55
Valid votes	82,669	92.98	
Invalid/blank votes	6,240	7.02	
Total votes	88,909	100.00	
Registered voters/turnout	141,792	62.70	

Radical Party leader Vojislav Šešelj was chosen as mayor after the election. He resigned on 30 March 1998 after being appointed as a minister in the Serbian government and was replaced by Stevo Dragišić, also of the Radicals.

===== Zvezdara =====
Results of the election for the Municipal Assembly of Zvezdara:

Party	Votes	%	Seats
Zajedno (Coalition Together)	17,840	28.31	40
Socialist Party of Serbia	16,106	25.56	7
Serbian Radical Party	12,028	19.09	2
Democratic Party of Serbia	7,680	12.19	3
Yugoslav Left	6,424	10.19	–
Citizens' Group candidates	724	1.15	1
United Radical Party of Serbia	444	0.70	–
Democratic Centre	433	0.69	–
Democratic Party of Serbia and Serbian Saint Sava Party	370	0.59	–
New Democracy	367	0.58	–
Universalist Movement of Serbia	350	0.56	–
Serb Democratic Party, People's Radical Party and Serbian National Renewal	96	0.15	–
Social Democratic Union	65	0.10	–
Parliamentary People's Party	61	0.10	–
Democratic Centre and Democratic Party of Serbia	31	0.05	–
Total	63,019	100.00	53
Valid votes	63,019	95.07	
Invalid/blank votes	3,268	4.93	
Total votes	66,287	100.00	
Registered voters/turnout	108,578	61.05	

Vučeta Mandić of Zajedno was chosen as mayor after the election.

=== Vojvodina ===
==== North Bačka District ====
Elections were held in all three municipalities of the North Bačka District. No party won a clear victory in any of the jurisdictions, and all of the new local administrations established afterward included representation from both the Alliance of Vojvodina Hungarians (VMSZ) and the Socialist Party of Serbia (SPS), along with other parties.

===== Subotica =====
Results of the election for the Municipal Assembly of Subotica:

Party	Votes	%	Seats
Alliance of Vojvodina Hungarians	14,023	20.92	24
Citizens' Group candidates	9,674	14.43	10
Socialist Party of Serbia	8,482	12.65	18
Serbian Radical Party	7,515	11.21	–
Democratic Fellowship of Vojvodina Hungarians	6,362	9.49	2
Alliance of Citizens of Subotica	5,647	8.42	6
Democratic Alliance of Croats in Vojvodina	4,388	6.55	3
Yugoslav Left	3,917	5.84	2
Reformist Democratic Party of Vojvodina	2,053	3.06	–
Zajedno (Coalition Together)	1,785	2.66	–
People's Peasant Party	1,162	1.73	1
Bunjevac-Šokac Party	887	1.32	1
League of Communists of Yugoslavia	443	0.66	–
League of Social Democrats of Vojvodina – Yugoslavia	273	0.41	–
People's Radical Party	176	0.26	–
Federal Party of Yugoslavs–JUL	152	0.23	–
New Democracy	91	0.14	–
Total	67,030	100.00	67
Valid votes	67,030	92.94	
Invalid/blank votes	5,089	7.06	
Total votes	72,119	100.00	
Registered voters/turnout	122,538	58.85	

No party or alliance held a working majority of seats, and the Alliance of Vojvodina Hungarians ultimately formed a grand coalition government with the rival Socialist Party of Serbia and other parties. Incumbent mayor József Kasza of the Alliance of Vojvodina Hungarians was confirmed for another term in office on 3 January 1997, while Veselin Avdalović of the Socialists and Mirko Bajić of the Alliance of Citizens of Subotica were chosen as deputy mayors. After a long and sometimes bitter debate at a follow-up meeting on 21 January 1997, incumbent executive council president Imre Kern of the Alliance of Vojvodina Hungarians was confirmed for another term in office, receiving thirty-four votes in a secret ballot against Mitar Nikolić of the Socialists (twenty-four votes), and Blaško Gabrić of the Alliance of Citizens of Subotica (seven votes).

Mirko Bajić left the Alliance of Citizens of Subotica in late 1999 and joined the Democratic Party.

===== Bačka Topola =====
Results of the election for the Municipal Assembly of Bačka Topola:

Party	Votes	%	Seats
Democratic Fellowship of Vojvodina Hungarians	3,939	22.01	2
Socialist Party of Serbia	3,601	20.13	17
Citizens' Group candidates	3,480	19.45	12
Alliance of Vojvodina Hungarians	3,068	17.15	17
Yugoslav Left	1,671	9.34	2
Serbian Radical Party	1,082	6.05	–
Zajedno (Coalition Together)	931	5.20	–
New Democracy	121	0.68	–
Total	17,893	100.00	50
Valid votes	17,893	92.79	
Invalid/blank votes	1,391	7.21	
Total votes	19,284	100.00	
Registered voters/turnout	32,555	59.24	

The vote and seat totals do not tell the full story. The Alliance of Vojvodina Hungarians (VMSZ) ran only twenty-five candidates in the election, while the Democratic Fellowship of Vojvodina Hungarians (VMDK) fielded thirty-eight. Although the VMDK technically received more votes in the first round, this was not obviously reflected in the final results.

The municipal administration established on 2 December 1996 included both the VMSZ and the Socialist Party of Serbia (SPS). Incumbent mayor Zoltán Turuc of the VMSZ was confirmed for another term in office, independent delegate Tibor Gáspár was chosen as deputy mayor, and Željko Stanić of the SPS became president of the executive council. At the time, twenty-two representatives sat with the SPS's assembly group, nineteen with the VMSZ's group, and five with an independent group, while the other four representatives were not yet affiliated with any group.

Endre Balassa of the VMSZ was chosen as a second deputy mayor of the municipality on 27 March 1997. In September 1998, Turuc resigned as mayor and Balassa was chosen as his replacement.

===== Mali Iđoš =====
Results of the election for the Municipal Assembly of Mali Iđoš:

Party	Votes	%	Seats
Socialist Party of Serbia	1,939	28.62	9
Democratic Fellowship of Vojvodina Hungarians	1,673	24.70	4
Alliance of Vojvodina Hungarians	1,431	21.12	9
Citizens' Group candidates	587	8.67	2
Zajedno (Coalition Together)	538	7.94	1
Serbian Radical Party	503	7.43	–
Yugoslav Left	103	1.52	–
Total	6,774	100.00	25
Valid votes	6,774	94.77	
Invalid/blank votes	374	5.23	
Total votes	7,148	100.00	
Registered voters/turnout	10,610	67.37	

The municipal administration established on 10 December 1996 included representation from the Alliance of Vojvodina Hungarians (VMSZ), the Democratic Fellowship of Vojvodina Hungarians (VMDK), and the Socialist Party of Serbia (SPS). Béla Sipos of the VMSZ was chosen as mayor, and the incumbent president of the executive council, Milan Stevović of the SPS, was confirmed for another term in office.

Relations between the Hungarian parties and the SPS had deteriorated significantly by late 1998. The SPS brought two motions of non-confidence against Sipos, which were subsequently withdrawn. On 11 November 1998, the assembly approved a SPS motion to remove Stevović from office, a decision that Stevović accepted. Local SPS leader Borivoje Drakulović then ran for the vacant position of executive council president but was not elected: he initially received the support of twelve delegates, one short of the required majority, and then received the support of only eleven delegates when a repeat vote was held later in the same meeting. These events led to a political impasse that continued until 30 March 1999, when the assembly voted to approve Drakulović in the role.

Another political crisis began later in 1999, when the SPS refused to accept a candidate favoured by the Hungarian parties to head the municipal public utilities corporation. The Hungarian parties temporarily withdrew from the assembly, and on 2 September 1999 Sipos submitted his resignation as mayor. The SPS later won the support of a working majority of delegates, and on 4 November 1999 Péter Tóth was chosen as acting mayor pending a resolution of the situation; Tóth had been elected as an independent delegate supported by the VMSZ, but he had already joined the SPS's assembly group prior to these events. The crisis was resolved on 21 February 2000, when János Maronka of the VMDK was chosen as the municipality's new mayor.

==== South Bačka District ====
Elections were held in all twelve municipalities of the South Bačka District. The Zajedno alliance won a convincing victory in Novi Sad, while the Socialist Party and Yugoslav Left won a number of the neighbouring jurisdictions. Independent candidates won a majority of seats in Bački Petrovac, and the Radical Party won the greatest number of seats in Temerin.

===== Novi Sad =====
Results of the election for the Municipal Assembly of Novi Sad:

Party	Votes	%	Seats
Zajedno (Coalition Together)	37,064	26.67	39
Socialist Party of Serbia	32,742	23.56	6
Serbian Radical Party	30,203	21.73	9
Yugoslav Left	11,745	8.45	–
Citizens' Group candidates	7,334	5.28	2
Vojvodina Coalition	6,695	4.82	10
New Democracy	3,663	2.64	–
Reformists – Coalition of the Democratic Center for Vojvodina	3,111	2.24	3
Democratic Fellowship of Vojvodina Hungarians	1,867	1.34	1
Democratic Party of Serbia	1,493	1.07	–
Serbian Democratic Alliance (SNO, NRS, SDS)	1,190	0.86	–
Green Party (Zelena stranka)	555	0.40	–
Serbian Radical Party "Nikola Pašić"	315	0.23	–
Democratic Alliance of Croats in Vojvodina	263	0.19	–
Yugoslav Left and Citizens' Group	223	0.16	–
People's Radical Party	179	0.13	–
New Communist Party of Yugoslavia	154	0.11	–
Natural Law Party	134	0.10	–
Universalist Movement of Serbia	56	0.04	–
Total	138,986	100.00	70
Valid votes	138,986	93.53	
Invalid/blank votes	9,614	6.47	
Total votes	148,600	100.00	
Registered voters/turnout	233,281	63.70	

Mihajlo Svilar of the Serbian Renewal Movement was chosen as mayor after the election. He was replaced on 18 June 1997 by fellow SPO member Stevan Vrbaški. Gordana Čomić of the Democratic Party served on Novi Sad's executive committee in 1997.

===== Bač =====
Results of the election for the Municipal Assembly of Bač:

Party	Votes	%	Seats
Socialist Party of Serbia	3,231	38.25	12
Zajedno (Coalition Together)	2,594	30.71	9
Serbian Radical Party	1,057	12.51	–
Citizens' Group candidates	885	10.48	3
Yugoslav Left	679	8.04	1
Total	8,446	100.00	25
Valid votes	8,446	91.70	
Invalid/blank votes	764	8.30	
Total votes	9,210	100.00	
Registered voters/turnout	13,194	69.80	

Branko Čalić of the Socialist Party of Serbia served as mayor after the election.

===== Bačka Palanka =====
Results of the election for the Municipal Assembly of Bačka Palanka:

Party	Votes	%	Seats
Socialist Party of Serbia	12,122	38.99	28
Zajedno (Coalition Together)	9,046	29.09	7
Yugoslav Left	4,952	15.93	5
Serbian Radical Party	3,498	11.25	–
Citizens' Group candidates	1,201	3.86	1
Serbian Democratic Alliance (SNO, NRS, SDS)	275	0.88	–
Total	31,094	100.00	41
Valid votes	31,094	93.52	
Invalid/blank votes	2,153	6.48	
Total votes	33,247	100.00	
Registered voters/turnout	46,808	71.03	

Stevan Panić of the Socialist Party of Serbia served as mayor after the election.

===== Bački Petrovac =====
Results of the election for the Municipal Assembly of Bački Petrovac:

Party	Votes	%	Seats
Citizens' Group candidates	2,780	38.29	18
Socialist Party of Serbia	2,680	36.91	8
Zajedno (Coalition Together)	668	9.20	4
Serbian Radical Party	513	7.07	1
Yugoslav Left	354	4.88	–
Vojvodina Coalition	266	3.66	–
Total	7,261	100.00	31
Valid votes	7,261	94.74	
Invalid/blank votes	403	5.26	
Total votes	7,664	100.00	
Registered voters/turnout	11,998	63.88	

Incumbent mayor Juraj Červenak was confirmed for another term in office after the election.

===== Bečej =====
Results of the election for the Municipal Assembly of Bečej:

Party	Votes	%	Seats
Citizens' Group candidates	6,258	31.31	10
Socialist Party of Serbia	4,997	25.00	10
Alliance of Vojvodina Hungarians	4,238	21.20	12
Zajedno (Coalition Together)	2,749	13.75	4
Serbian Radical Party	1,521	7.61	–
Yugoslav Left	227	1.14	–
Total	19,990	100.00	36
Valid votes	19,990	92.05	
Invalid/blank votes	1,726	7.95	
Total votes	21,716	100.00	
Registered voters/turnout	32,274	67.29	

Incumbent mayor Endre Huszágh of the Alliance of Vojvodina Hungarians was confirmed for another term in office after the election.

===== Beočin =====
Results of the election for the Municipal Assembly of Beočin:

Party	Votes	%	Seats
Socialist Party of Serbia	2,460	30.85	14
Citizens' Group candidates	1,583	19.85	7
Serbian Radical Party	1,580	19.81	5
Yugoslav Left	1,267	15.89	5
Zajedno (Coalition Together)	1,049	13.15	4
Serbian Democratic Alliance (SNO, NRS, SDS)	36	0.45	–
Total	7,975	100.00	35
Valid votes	7,975	91.94	
Invalid/blank votes	699	8.06	
Total votes	8,674	100.00	
Registered voters/turnout	10,973	79.05	

Dragan Tomović of the Socialist Party of Serbia served as mayor after the election.

===== Srbobran =====
Results of the election for the Municipal Assembly of Srbobran:

Party	Votes	%	Seats
Socialist Party of Serbia	2,619	31.34	9
Zajedno (Coalition Together)	2,023	24.21	10
Democratic Fellowship of Vojvodina Hungarians	1,122	13.43	4
Serbian Radical Party	1,045	12.50	1
Citizens' Group candidates	739	8.84	3
Yugoslav Left	645	7.72	–
Alliance of Vojvodina Hungarians	164	1.96	1
Total	8,357	100.00	28
Valid votes	8,357	90.02	
Invalid/blank votes	926	9.98	
Total votes	9,283	100.00	
Registered voters/turnout	13,254	70.04	

When the assembly convened on 20 December 1996, Milan Dunđerski of the Zajedno coalition was chosen as mayor, Dušan Mihajlović from the Turija Citizens' Group as deputy mayor, and Mladenko Kačanski as chair of the executive committee.

===== Sremski Karlovci =====
Results of the election for the Municipal Assembly of Sremski Karlovci:

Party	Votes	%	Seats
Socialist Party of Serbia	1,909	48.32	15
Zajedno (Coalition Together)	1,436	36.35	7
Citizens' Group candidates	443	11.21	3
Serbian Radical Party	103	2.61	–
Yugoslav Left	60	1.52	–
Total	3,951	100.00	25
Valid votes	3,951	89.88	
Invalid/blank votes	445	10.12	
Total votes	4,396	100.00	
Registered voters/turnout	6,824	64.42	

Incumbent mayor Miladin Kalinić of the Socialist Party of Serbia served another term in office after the election.

===== Temerin =====
Results of the election for the Municipal Assembly of Temerin:

Party	Votes	%	Seats
Serbian Radical Party	3,754	27.54	14
Democratic Fellowship of Vojvodina Hungarians	3,412	25.03	13
Socialist Party of Serbia	2,184	16.02	1
Citizens' Group candidates	2,128	15.61	1
Zajedno (Coalition Together)	1,753	12.86	2
Yugoslav Left	398	2.92	–
Total	13,629	100.00	31
Valid votes	13,629	94.17	
Invalid/blank votes	843	5.83	
Total votes	14,472	100.00	
Registered voters/turnout	18,712	77.34	

Bogoljub Zec of the Serbian Radical Party was chosen as mayor after the election, with support from the Socialist Party delegate and the independent delegate.

===== Titel =====
Results of the election for the Municipal Assembly of Titel:

Party	Votes	%	Seats
Socialist Party of Serbia	2,482	31.22	8
Zajedno (Coalition Together)	2,149	27.03	8
Serbian Radical Party	1,775	22.33	6
Yugoslav Left	1,047	13.17	2
Democratic Party of Serbia	270	3.40	–
People's Peasant Party	143	1.80	1
Citizens' Group candidates	83	1.04	–
Total	7,949	100.00	25
Valid votes	7,949	93.01	
Invalid/blank votes	597	6.99	
Total votes	8,546	100.00	
Registered voters/turnout	12,124	70.49	

Following the election, the six elected members of the Serbian Radical Party broke away from that party to form their own Citizens' Group, which joined with Zajedno to form a new coalition government. The People's Peasant Party was also part of the government, and the Yugoslav Left later joined as well. Stevan Marjanov, an ex-Radical, served as president of the executive committee.

On 10 July 1998, the Serbian government controversially dissolved the local government and appointed a nine-member provisional council, overseen by Boško Kojić of the Socialist Party of Serbia. The Socialists, Yugoslav Left, and Radicals were each given three seats on the council.

===== Vrbas =====
Results of the election for the Municipal Assembly of Vrbas:

Party	Votes	%	Seats
Socialist Party of Serbia	9,056	39.75	18
Zajedno (Coalition Together)	8,250	36.21	13
Yugoslav Left	2,965	13.01	1
Serbian Radical Party	2,083	9.14	2
Citizens' Group candidates	430	1.89	1
Total	22,784	100.00	35
Valid votes	22,784	91.91	
Invalid/blank votes	2,006	8.09	
Total votes	24,790	100.00	
Registered voters/turnout	35,038	70.75	

Milutin Nikić of the Socialist Party of Serbia served as mayor after the election. Veselin Mijatović served as president of the executive council.

===== Žabalj =====
Results of the election for the Municipal Assembly of Žabalj:

Party	Votes	%	Seats
Zajedno (Coalition Together)	3,802	33.98	22
Socialist Party of Serbia	3,656	32.67	4
Serbian Radical Party	2,018	18.03	1
Democratic Party of Serbia	958	8.56	3
Citizens' Group candidates	506	4.52	1
Yugoslav Left	250	2.23	–
Total	11,190	100.00	31
Valid votes	11,190	91.16	
Invalid/blank votes	1,085	8.84	
Total votes	12,275	100.00	
Registered voters/turnout	19,451	63.11	

Đorđe Đukić of the Democratic Party was chosen as mayor after the election.

=== Central Serbia (excluding Belgrade) ===
==== Nišava District ====
Local elections were held in the one city (Niš) and the six other municipalities of the Nišava District. Following the opposition protests, it was recognized that the Zajedno alliance won a majority of seats in the election for the City Assembly of Niš. The Socialist Party won majority victories in all six of the smaller communities.

===== Niš =====
Results of the election for the City Assembly of Niš:

Party	Seats
Zajedno (Coalition Together)	48
Socialist Party of Serbia	21
Serbian Radical Party	1
Democratic Party of Serbia	–
Yugoslav Left	–
New Communist Party of Yugoslavia	–
Party of Independent Democrats of Serbia	–
Citizens' Group candidates	–
Total	70

Zoran Živković of the Democratic Party was chosen as mayor after the election. Future mayor Goran Ćirić, also of the Democratic Party, was elected to the assembly and served as a member of its executive committee for the term that followed.

Zoran Krasić was a Radical Party candidate and the party's presumptive nominee for mayor; he was not elected to the assembly.

===== Aleksinac =====
Results of the election for the Municipal Assembly of Aleksinac:

Party	Votes	%	Seats
Socialist Party of Serbia	12,708	40.97	29
Zajedno (Coalition Together)	6,844	22.06	9
Serbian Radical Party	6,800	21.92	9
Yugoslav Left	2,587	8.34	1
Citizens' Group candidates	1,565	5.05	2
New Democracy	340	1.10	–
Party of Serbian Unity	175	0.56	–
Total	31,019	100.00	50
Valid votes	31,019	93.19	
Invalid/blank votes	2,268	6.81	
Total votes	33,287	100.00	
Registered voters/turnout	48,250	68.99	

Slobodan Stevanović of the Socialist Party served as mayor after the election.

===== Doljevac =====
Results of the election for the Municipal Assembly of Doljevac:

Party	Votes	%	Seats
Socialist Party of Serbia	5,295	42.92	27
Citizens' Group candidates	2,626	21.29	7
Serbian Radical Party	2,236	18.12	1
Zajedno (Coalition Together)	1,547	12.54	1
Yugoslav Left	633	5.13	1
Total	12,337	100.00	37
Valid votes	12,337	95.40	
Invalid/blank votes	595	4.60	
Total votes	12,932	100.00	
Registered voters/turnout	15,470	83.59	

Incumbent mayor Aleksandar Cvetković of the Socialist Party was confirmed for another term in office after the election.

===== Gadžin Han =====
Results of the election for the Municipal Assembly of Gadžin Han:

Party	Votes	%	Seats
Socialist Party of Serbia	3,955	53.10	30
Serbian Radical Party	1,224	16.43	3
Zajedno (Coalition Together)	1,107	14.86	4
Citizens' Group candidates	955	12.82	6
Yugoslav Left	207	2.78	–
Total	7,448	100.00	43
Valid votes	7,448	92.69	
Invalid/blank votes	587	7.31	
Total votes	8,035	100.00	
Registered voters/turnout	10,919	73.59	

Incumbent mayor Siniša Stamenković of the Socialist Party was confirmed for another term in office after the election.

===== Merošina =====
Results of the election for the Municipal Assembly of Merošina:

Party	Votes	%	Seats
Socialist Party of Serbia	3,918	45.43	23
Yugoslav Left	2,092	24.26	7
Citizens' Group candidates	1,505	17.45	6
Zajedno (Coalition Together)	568	6.59	1
Serbian Radical Party	542	6.28	2
Total	8,625	100.00	39
Valid votes	8,625	94.44	
Invalid/blank votes	508	5.56	
Total votes	9,133	100.00	
Registered voters/turnout	12,289	74.32	

===== Ražanj =====
Results of the election for the Municipal Assembly of Ražanj:

Party	Votes	%	Seats
Socialist Party of Serbia	3,021	42.41	19
Yugoslav Left	2,290	32.14	6
Citizens' Group candidates	1,254	17.60	4
Zajedno (Coalition Together)	559	7.85	2
Total	7,124	100.00	31
Valid votes	7,124	92.50	
Invalid/blank votes	578	7.50	
Total votes	7,702	100.00	
Registered voters/turnout	10,440	73.77	

===== Svrljig =====
Results of the election for the Municipal Assembly of Svrljig:

Party	Votes	%	Seats
Socialist Party of Serbia	5,709	48.87	21
Zajedno (Coalition Together)	3,695	31.63	8
Serbian Radical Party	1,049	8.98	1
Citizens' Group candidates	582	4.98	–
Yugoslav Left	401	3.43	–
New Democracy	247	2.11	1
Total	11,683	100.00	31
Valid votes	11,683	92.62	
Invalid/blank votes	931	7.38	
Total votes	12,614	100.00	
Registered voters/turnout	16,728	75.41	

==== Šumadija District ====
Elections were held in all seven municipalities of the Šumadija District. The Zajedno coalition won in the city of Kragujevac and also in the municipality of Lapovo. The Socialist Party won majority victories in four of the other municipalities; in Batočina, the Yugoslav Left formed a minority administration with the support of the Socialists and some independent delegates.

===== Kragujevac =====
Results of the election for the City Assembly of Kragujevac:

Party	Votes	%	Seats
Zajedno (Coalition Together)	32,845	36.06	41
Socialist Party of Serbia	26,817	29.44	23
Serbian Radical Party	12,033	13.21	1
Yugoslav Left	7,276	7.99	2
New Democracy	5,550	6.09	–
Citizens' Group candidates	2,105	2.31	–
Movement "Vojvoda Vuk 1903-1993"	1,111	1.22	–
Workers' Party of Yugoslavia	889	0.98	–
Party of Serbian Unity	576	0.63	–
Green Party	545	0.60	–
Parliamentary People's Party	543	0.60	–
"Roma" Serbia and Yugoslavia Democratic Political Party of the Roma Community of Yugoslavia	370	0.41	–
Šumadija Homeland Assembly	353	0.39	–
Serbian National Renewal	83	0.09	–
Total	91,096	100.00	67
Valid votes	91,096	96.66	
Invalid/blank votes	3,151	3.34	
Total votes	94,247	100.00	
Registered voters/turnout	134,343	70.15	

The Milošević government did not contest the opposition's victory in Kragujevac. Veroljub Stevanović of the Serbian Renewal Movement became mayor after the election. The Zajedno government in the city remained together for the full term that followed.

===== Aranđelovac =====
Results of the election for the Municipal Assembly of Aranđelovac:

Party	Votes	%	Seats
Socialist Party of Serbia	8,971	37.72	32
Zajedno (Coalition Together)	6,869	28.88	7
Yugoslav Left	3,618	15.21	–
Citizens' Group candidates	2,317	9.74	2
Serbian Radical Party	1,845	7.76	–
Peasants Party of Serbia	164	0.69	–
Total	23,784	100.00	41
Valid votes	23,784	94.25	
Invalid/blank votes	1,451	5.75	
Total votes	25,235	100.00	
Registered voters/turnout	36,427	69.28	

Incumbent mayor Milosav Ivović of the Socialist Party of Serbia was confirmed for another term in office after the election.

===== Batočina =====
Results of the election for the Municipal Assembly of Batočina:

Party	Votes	%	Seats
Zajedno (Coalition Together)	2,421	31.22	12
Yugoslav Left	1,801	23.22	9
Socialist Party of Serbia	1,634	21.07	4
Citizens' Group candidates	1,617	20.85	8
New Democracy	271	3.49	2
Serbian Radical Party	11	0.14	–
Total	7,755	100.00	35
Valid votes	7,755	95.00	
Invalid/blank votes	408	5.00	
Total votes	8,163	100.00	
Registered voters/turnout	10,779	75.73	

Slobodan Živulović of the Yugoslav Left served as mayor after the election.

===== Knić =====
Results of the election for the Municipal Assembly of Knić:

Party	Votes	%	Seats
Socialist Party of Serbia	3,898	39.51	19
Zajedno (Coalition Together)	3,561	36.09	11
Yugoslav Left	2,146	21.75	2
Citizens' Group candidates	210	2.13	1
Serbian Radical Party	28	0.28	–
New Communist Party of Yugoslavia	24	0.24	–
Total	9,867	100.00	33
Valid votes	9,867	95.69	
Invalid/blank votes	444	4.31	
Total votes	10,311	100.00	
Registered voters/turnout	14,479	71.21	

===== Lapovo =====
Results of the election for the Municipal Assembly of Lapovo:

Party	Votes	%	Seats
Zajedno (Coalition Together)	2,442	45.53	16
Socialist Party of Serbia	1,696	31.62	12
Yugoslav Left	453	8.45	1
Citizens' Group candidates	313	5.84	–
New Democracy	259	4.83	–
Serbian Radical Party	200	3.73	–
Total	5,363	100.00	29
Valid votes	5,363	95.96	
Invalid/blank votes	226	4.04	
Total votes	5,589	100.00	
Registered voters/turnout	7,363	75.91	

Dragan Zlatković of the Serbian Renewal Movement served as mayor after the election. Future parliamentarian Mirko Čikiriz, also of the Serbian Renewal Movement, served as secretary of the municipal assembly and the municipal administration in 1997–98.

===== Rača =====
Results of the election for the Municipal Assembly of Rača:

Party	Votes	%	Seats
Socialist Party of Serbia	3,133	37.42	16
Zajedno (Coalition Together)	3,032	36.22	9
Citizens' Group candidates	1,106	13.21	3
Democratic Party of Serbia	545	6.51	–
Serbian Radical Party	347	4.14	–
Yugoslav Left	209	2.50	–
Total	8,372	100.00	28
Valid votes	8,372	96.45	
Invalid/blank votes	308	3.55	
Total votes	8,680	100.00	
Registered voters/turnout	11,799	73.57	

===== Topola =====
Results of the election for the Municipal Assembly of Topola:

Party	Votes	%	Seats
Socialist Party of Serbia	6,289	45.20	33
Zajedno (Coalition Together)	5,672	40.76	6
Yugoslav Left	1,118	8.04	–
Citizens' Group candidates	835	6.00	–
Total	13,914	100.00	39
Valid votes	13,914	95.41	
Invalid/blank votes	670	4.59	
Total votes	14,584	100.00	
Registered voters/turnout	21,570	67.61	

Incumbent mayor Žarko Jovanović of the Socialist Party of Serbia was confirmed for another term in office after the election.

==== Zlatibor District ====
Local elections were held in all ten municipalities of the Zlatibor District. The Zajedno coalition won the election in the capital, Užice, and also won in Arilje, Bajina Bašta, and Požega. The Socialists won in Čajetina, Kosjerić, Nova Varoš, Priboj, and Prijepolje. In Sjenica, the List for Sandžak won a majority victory.

===== Užice =====
Results of the election for the City Assembly of Užice:

Party	Votes	%	Seats
Zajedno (Coalition Together)	16,850	40.75	38
Socialist Party of Serbia	13,886	33.58	29
Serbian Radical Party	3,977	9.62	–
Yugoslav Left	3,045	7.36	–
Democratic Party of Serbia	1,809	4.37	–
New Democracy	544	1.32	–
Parliamentary People's Party	507	1.23	–
Citizens' Group candidates	412	1.00	–
Serbian Radical Party – Nikola Pašić	288	0.70	–
Democratic Centre	36	0.09	–
Total	41,354	100.00	67
Valid votes	41,354	95.96	
Invalid/blank votes	1,739	4.04	
Total votes	43,093	100.00	
Registered voters/turnout	67,181	64.14	

When the city assembly convened on 14 December 1996, Milan Nikitović of the Serbian Renewal Movement was chosen as mayor, Miroslav Martić of the Democratic Party was chosen as deputy mayor, and Aleksandar Ćirović of the Democratic Party became president of the assembly's executive committee. In late December 1996, Đorđe Mijušković of the Serbian Renewal Movement was chosen as a second deputy mayor.

Ćirović left the Democratic Party to serve as an independent representative in December 1998 but remained executive board president.

Bogoljub Zečević of the Serbian Renewal Movement was elected to the city assembly as a Zajedno candidate, and in December 1996 he was appointed to the assembly's executive committee. In 1998, he was one of four elected representatives from the SPO to join the Christian Democratic Party of Serbia (DHSS).

===== Arilje =====
Results of the election for the Municipal Assembly of Arilje:

Party	Votes	%	Seats
Zajedno (Coalition Together)	5,077	47.62	16
Socialist Party of Serbia	3,204	30.05	7
Yugoslav Left	1,472	13.81	1
Serbian Radical Party	460	4.31	1
New Democracy and Peasants Party of Serbia	339	3.18	–
Citizens' Group candidates	109	1.02	–
Total	10,661	100.00	25
Valid votes	10,661	94.06	
Invalid/blank votes	673	5.94	
Total votes	11,334	100.00	
Registered voters/turnout	15,899	71.29	

When the assembly convened, Radojko Mladenović (who later contested the 2004 Serbian local elections as a Democratic Party of Serbia candidate) was chosen as mayor. Zoran Mićović of the Democratic Party served as deputy mayor, and Dragan Radoičić served as president of the assembly's executive committee. Mićević succeeded Mladenović as mayor in 1998, after some upheaval in the coalition.

===== Bajina Bašta =====
Results of the election for the Municipal Assembly of Bajina Bašta:

Party	Votes	%	Seats
Zajedno (Coalition Together)	5,144	37.59	22
Socialist Party of Serbia	3,593	26.26	7
Serbian Radical Party	2,364	17.28	4
Yugoslav Left	2,075	15.16	5
Citizens' Group candidates	507	3.71	3
Total	13,683	100.00	41
Valid votes	13,683	94.58	
Invalid/blank votes	784	5.42	
Total votes	14,467	100.00	
Registered voters/turnout	22,861	63.28	

Milanka Božić of the Serbian Renewal Movement served as mayor after the election.

===== Čajetina =====
Results of the election for the Municipal Assembly of Čajetina:

Party	Votes	%	Seats
Socialist Party of Serbia	3,446	41.84	18
Zajedno (Coalition Together)	2,960	35.94	12
Yugoslav Left	759	9.21	1
Serbian Radical Party	687	8.34	–
Citizens' Group candidates	385	4.67	–
Total	8,237	100.00	31
Valid votes	8,237	94.78	
Invalid/blank votes	454	5.22	
Total votes	8,691	100.00	
Registered voters/turnout	12,414	70.01	

Radenko Simović, presumably of the Socialist Party of Serbia, was chosen as mayor after the election. Dragan Novaković served as deputy mayor, and incumbent executive board president Vlado Marjanović was confirmed for another term in office.

===== Kosjerić =====
Results of the election for the Municipal Assembly of Kosjerić:

Party	Votes	%	Seats
Socialist Party of Serbia	4,453	48.20	16
Democratic Blok (SPO, DS, DSS)	3,785	40.97	9
Serbian Radical Party	462	5.00	–
Citizens' Group candidates	401	4.34	1
Yugoslav Left	138	1.49	1
Total	9,239	100.00	27
Valid votes	9,239	96.60	
Invalid/blank votes	325	3.40	
Total votes	9,564	100.00	
Registered voters/turnout	12,021	79.56	

Milan Pavlović, presumably of the Socialist Party of Serbia, was chosen as mayor after the elections. Bogdan Marković served as deputy mayor, and Dragan Vujić served as president of the assembly's executive committee.

===== Nova Varoš =====
Results of the election for the Municipal Assembly of Nova Varoš:

Party	Votes	%	Seats
Socialist Party of Serbia	3,977	41.57	15
Zajedno (Coalition Together)	3,047	31.85	5
Yugoslav Left	1,022	10.68	6
Citizens' Group candidates	703	7.35	1
Serbian Radical Party	597	6.24	–
Democratic Party of Serbia	221	2.31	–
Total	9,567	100.00	27
Valid votes	9,567	94.09	
Invalid/blank votes	601	5.91	
Total votes	10,168	100.00	
Registered voters/turnout	16,432	61.88	

===== Požega =====
Results of the election for the Municipal Assembly of Požega:

Party	Votes	%	Seats
Zajedno (Coalition Together)	7,846	42.39	27
Socialist Party of Serbia	7,624	41.19	23
Serbian Radical Party	1,839	9.94	1
Yugoslav Left	1,061	5.73	–
Citizens' Group candidates	138	0.75	1
Total	18,508	100.00	52
Valid votes	18,508	95.51	
Invalid/blank votes	871	4.49	
Total votes	19,379	100.00	
Registered voters/turnout	26,692	72.60	

Tihomir Marjanović of the Serbian Renewal Movement was chosen as mayor after the election, while Milka Marinković of the Democratic Party became deputy mayor and Branimir Stević of the Serbian Renewal Movement became president of the assembly's executive committee.

===== Priboj =====
Results of the election for the Municipal Assembly of Priboj:

Party	Votes	%	Seats
Socialist Party of Serbia	5,081	33.28	22
Zajedno (Coalition Together)	3,226	21.13	2
Yugoslav Left	2,137	14.00	8
Coalition: List for Sandžak Dr. Sulejman Ugljanin	1,862	12.20	4
Serbian Radical Party	1,393	9.12	2
New Democracy	683	4.47	1
Citizens' Group candidates	627	4.11	2
League of Communists of Yugoslavia	257	1.68	–
Total	15,266	100.00	41
Valid votes	15,266	95.93	
Invalid/blank votes	647	4.07	
Total votes	15,913	100.00	
Registered voters/turnout	24,230	65.67	

Desimir Ćirković of the Socialists served as mayor after the election.

===== Prijepolje =====
Results of the election for the Municipal Assembly of Prijepolje:

Party	Votes	%	Seats
Socialist Party of Serbia	6,812	30.47	29
Coalition: List for Sandžak Dr. Sulejman Ugljanin	6,801	30.42	17
Zajedno (Coalition Together)	2,562	11.46	2
Serbian Radical Party and Democratic Party of Serbia	2,526	11.30	2
Citizens' Group candidates	2,504	11.20	7
Yugoslav Left	1,126	5.04	–
Serbian National Renewal	23	0.10	–
Total	22,354	100.00	57
Valid votes	22,354	96.06	
Invalid/blank votes	917	3.94	
Total votes	23,271	100.00	
Registered voters/turnout	33,500	69.47	

Incumbent mayor Stevan Purić of the Socialists was confirmed for another term in office after the election.

===== Sjenica =====
Results of the election for the Municipal Assembly of Sjenica:

Party	Votes	%	Seats
Coalition: List for Sandžak Dr. Sulejman Ugljanin	9,711	65.54	20
Socialist Party of Serbia	2,480	16.74	5
Yugoslav Left	1,335	9.01	–
Citizens' Group candidates	579	3.91	3
Serbian Radical Party	384	2.59	1
Zajedno (Coalition Together)	328	2.21	–
Total	14,817	100.00	29
Valid votes	14,817	96.43	
Invalid/blank votes	548	3.57	
Total votes	15,365	100.00	
Registered voters/turnout	20,605	74.57	

Džemail Suljević of the Party of Democratic Action of Sandžak (SDA) became mayor of Sjenica after the election. In mid-2000, Suljević left the SDA to become the leader of the Sandžak People's Movement.

According to a 2010 article in Danas, Suljević resigned as mayor of Sjenica in early 2000. Assuming this is accurate, he was likely replaced by Fuad Hrnjak.

=== Kosovo and Metohija ===
The elections in Kosovo and Metohija were largely boycotted by members of the Kosovo Albanian community, which had set up parallel governing institutions in the province under the name of the Republic of Kosova in 1991.

==== Kosovska Mitrovica District ====
Local elections were held in all six municipalities of the Kosovska Mitrovica District. The Socialist Party won majority victories in all jurisdictions except Zvečan, where no party won a majority and an incumbent from the opposition was confirmed in office for another term.

===== Kosovska Mitrovica =====
Results of the election for the Municipal Assembly of Kosovska Mitrovica:

Party	Votes	%	Seats
Socialist Party of Serbia	3,819	50.29	26
Serbian Radical Party	1,551	20.42	2
Democratic Party of Serbia	1,166	15.35	2
Yugoslav Left	878	11.56	–
Zajedno (Coalition Together)	93	1.22	–
Citizens' Group candidates	87	1.15	–
Total	7,594	100.00	30
Valid votes	7,594	94.92	
Invalid/blank votes	406	5.08	
Total votes	8,000	100.00	
Registered voters/turnout	63,961	12.51	

Nikola Radović, presumably of the Socialist Party of Serbia, served as mayor after the election.

After the Kosovo War, Kosovska Mitrovica became divided between the predominantly Serb north and the predominantly Albanian south. The Serbian government continued to recognize Radović as mayor of the city until 2002, his mandate having been formally extended. In practice, Oliver Ivanović of the Serbian National Council (SNV), a parallel authority within the Serb community, was the de facto leader of northern Kosovska Mitrovica in the immediate post-war period.

From 1999 to 2001, Ivanović was both the president of the SNV's executive council and the leader of its municipal board in Kosovska Mitrovica. He was dismissed from the former position by hardline elements in June 2001 and afterward left the SNV entirely. Nebojša Jović succeeded him as the SNV's municipal leader in Kosovska Mitrovica, but Jović did not have the same standing in the community and did not inherit Ivanović's leadership role more generally.

Kosovo Liberation Army (KLA) leader Hashim Thaçi's self-styled government of Kosovo appointed Bajram Rexhepi as mayor of the city in mid-1999. He was the de facto leader of its predominantly Albanian southern half, which was beyond the control of Serbian authorities. Rexhepi was a founding member of the Party for the Democratic Progress of Kosovo (PPDK) in October 1999; this party later became the Democratic Party of Kosovo (PDK).

There was significant turnover among United Nations Interim Administration Mission in Kosovo (UNMIK) personnel in Kosovska Mitrovica in the immediate post-war period. Onelia Cardettini became the city's first UNMIK municipal administrator in 1999 but had stood down by early 2000. Online sources do not indicate if the position was filled immediately after her departure, and in practice UNMIK's successive district coordinators seem to have taken the lead role in administering the city.

By 2002, John Rogers had been appointed as UNMIK's municipal administrator for Kosovska Mitrovica. In November of that year, the Serbian government made an agreement for the northern part of the city to be administered directly by UNMIK with assistance from an advisory council composed of local political representatives and chaired by Rogers. Nikola Radović, still recognized as mayor of the city by Serbia, gave his support to the initiative. The board held its first meeting on 30 May 2003, by which time Rogers had been replaced by Minna Järvenpää. In August 2003, Serb representatives announced a boycott of the council over what they described as Järvenpää's arbitrary decisions. Her term as administrator ended in early 2004.

Online sources do not indicate who, if anyone, chaired the advisory council between 2004 and 2006, when Serb politician Srboljub Milenković of the Democratic Party was appointed to the role.

===== Leposavić =====
Results of the election for the Municipal Assembly of Leposavić:

Party	Votes	%	Seats
Socialist Party of Serbia	3,959	47.39	24
Zajedno (Coalition Together)	1,799	21.53	3
Serbian Radical Party	1,502	17.98	1
Yugoslav Left	627	7.51	2
Citizens' Group candidates	467	5.59	1
Total	8,354	100.00	31
Valid votes	8,354	95.12	
Invalid/blank votes	429	4.88	
Total votes	8,783	100.00	
Registered voters/turnout	11,015	79.74	

Dragan Jablanović of the Socialist Party was chosen as mayor after the election and served until the beginning of 2001. Leposavić remained under de facto Serbian authority after the Kosovo War.

A branch of the Serbian National Council was established in Leposavić after the Kosovo War as a parallel authority within the Serb community, and Nenad Radosavljević of New Democracy was chosen as its first leader. There is contradictory information as to the length of his tenure: one source indicates that he served from 1999 to 2001, while another claims he was removed from office by hardline elements in July 2000 after expressing a willingness to participate in new municipal elections organized by the Organization for Security and Co-operation in Europe (OSCE). In any event, Velimir Bojović of the Democratic Party of Serbia had become the leader of the local SNV by 2001.

Online sources do not indicate the name of the United Nations Interim Administration Mission in Kosovo (UNMIK) representative in Leposavić in the immediate post-war period.

Kosovo's Serb community generally boycotted the 2000 Kosovan local elections overseen by UNMIK and the OSCE, and the results in three predominantly Serb northern communities (including Leposavić) were not certified due to low turnout. After the vote, UNMIK directly appointed representatives of the local Serb communities to municipal assemblies in these communities, and these assemblies in turn selected new mayors. Despite objections from some in the community, the assemblies ultimately provided functional local governments. Nenad Radosavljević became mayor in Leposavić but stood down in 2001. Online sources do not indicate if anyone was formally appointed as his successor; Nebojša Radulović served as deputy mayor and may also have been acting mayor.

The Serb community of Leposavić generally participated in the 2002 Kosovan local elections overseen by UNMIK and the OSCE.

===== Srbica =====
Results of the election for the Municipal Assembly of Srbica:

Party	Votes	%	Seats
Socialist Party of Serbia	529	80.89	19
Citizens' Group candidates	125	19.11	–
Total	654	100.00	19
Valid votes	654	96.04	
Invalid/blank votes	27	3.96	
Total votes	681	100.00	
Registered voters/turnout	31,073	2.19	

Sima Simić of the Socialist Party of Serbia was chosen as mayor after the election. Slavica Jeradić was president of the assembly's executive board.

Serbia lost control of Srbica after the Kosovo War, and most of the area's Serb population fled the area (although the villages of Suvo Grlo and Banje ultimately remained as Serb communities). Kosovo Liberation Army (KLA) leader Hashim Thaçi's self-styled government of Kosovo appointed Ramadan Dobra as mayor in mid-1999. Dobra was a founding member of the Party for the Democratic Progress of Kosovo (PPDK) in October 1999; this party later became the Democratic Party of Kosovo (PDK).

Ken Inoue was appointed by the United Nations Interim Administration Mission in Kosovo (UNMIK) as municipal administrator in August 1999, and in the following month he formally appointed Dobra as president of the municipal board. Due to ongoing complaints about the PPDK's dominance in the local government, Inoue also appointed Fadil Geci of the rival Democratic League of Kosovo (LDK) as second deputy president in February 2000. Inoue served as municipal administrator until 2001.

An August 2000 report in the Christian Science Monitor noted that former KLA soldiers affiliated with the PDK exercised "virtual complete control" over the area.

===== Vučitrn =====
Results of the election for the Municipal Assembly of Vučitrn:

Party	Votes	%	Seats
Socialist Party of Serbia	2,000	49.09	25
Citizens' Group candidates	1,869	45.88	8
Serbian Radical Party	177	4.34	2
Yugoslav Left	28	0.69	–
Total	4,074	100.00	35
Valid votes	4,074	96.22	
Invalid/blank votes	160	3.78	
Total votes	4,234	100.00	
Registered voters/turnout	43,029	9.84	

Slobodan Doknić, presumably of the Socialist Party, served as mayor after the election.

Serbia lost control of Vučitrn after the Kosovo War, and many of the municipality's Serbs fled the area. Kosovo Liberation Army (KLA) leader Hashim Thaçi's self-styled government of Kosovo appointed Xhemajl Pllana as mayor of the municipality in mid-1999. Pllana was a founding member of the Party for the Democratic Progress of Kosovo (PPDK) in October 1999; this party later became the Democratic Party of Kosovo (PDK).

Denny Lane was appointed as municipal administrator by the United Nations Interim Administration Mission in Kosovo (UNMIK) in October 1999, and after arriving he formalized Pllana's role as interim mayor. Lane served as municipal administrator until 2001.

===== Zubin Potok =====
Results of the election for the Municipal Assembly of Zubin Potok:

Party	Votes	%	Seats
Socialist Party of Serbia	1,682	43.27	15
Citizens' Group candidates	1,360	34.99	8
Democratic Party of Serbia	485	12.48	3
New Democracy	289	7.44	3
Serbian Radical Party	71	1.83	–
Total	3,887	100.00	29
Valid votes	3,887	99.41	
Invalid/blank votes	23	0.59	
Total votes	3,910	100.00	
Registered voters/turnout	5,598	69.85	

Srđan Vulović of the Socialist Party of Serbia served as mayor in the term that followed. Zubin Potok remained under de facto Serbian authority after the Kosovo War.

A branch of the Serbian National Council was established in Zubin Potok following the Kosovo War as a parallel authority within the Serb community. Slaviša Ristić of the Democratic Party of Serbia was its leader.

Guy Sands-Pingot was appointed by the United Nations Interim Administration Mission in Kosovo (UNMIK) as municipal administrator in the immediate post-war period.

Kosovo's Serb community generally boycotted the 2000 Kosovan local elections overseen by UNMIK and the Organization for Security and Co-operation in Europe (OSCE), and the results in three predominantly Serb northern communities (including Zubin Potok) were not certified due to low turnout. After the vote, UNMIK directly appointed representatives of the local Serb communities to municipal assemblies in these communities, and these assemblies in turn selected new mayors. Despite objections from some in the community, the assemblies ultimately provided functional local governments. Slaviša Ristić was chosen as mayor in Zubin Potok.

The Serb community of Zubin Potok generally participated in the 2002 Kosovan local elections overseen by UNMIK and the OSCE.

===== Zvečan =====
Results of the election for the Municipal Assembly of Zvečan:

Party	Votes	%	Seats
Citizens' Group candidates	1,462	34.89	6
Socialist Party of Serbia	1,188	28.35	12
Serbian Radical Party	563	13.44	2
Zajedno (Coalition Together)	399	9.52	2
Yugoslav Left	159	3.79	1
New Democracy	158	3.77	2
Democratic Party of Serbia	153	3.65	1
Party of Serbian Unity	108	2.58	1
Total	4,190	100.00	27
Valid votes	4,190	96.68	
Invalid/blank votes	144	3.32	
Total votes	4,334	100.00	
Registered voters/turnout	6,577	65.90	

Incumbent mayor Desimir Petković, an opponent of Milošević's rule, was confirmed for another term in office after the election. He was removed from office in June 2000 and replaced by Miomira Ignjatović. Zvečan remained under de facto Serbian authority after the Kosovo War.

The Serbian National Council emerged as a parallel authority within the Serb community in 1999, and its members included prominent Zvečan residents such as Milan Ivanović. Online accounts do not indicate who, if anyone, initially led the council's Zvečan municipal committee. Milan Ivanović ultimately transformed the organization into a political party and became its leader in the municipality.

Online sources do not indicate the name of the United Nations Interim Administration Mission in Kosovo (UNMIK) representative in Zvečan in the immediate post-war period.

Kosovo's Serb community generally boycotted the 2000 Kosovan local elections overseen by UNMIK and the Organization for Security and Co-operation in Europe (OSCE), and the results in three predominantly Serb northern communities (including Zvečan) were not certified due to low turnout. After the vote, UNMIK directly appointed representatives of the local Serb communities to the local assemblies in these municipalities, and these assemblies in turn selected new mayors. Despite objections from some in the community, this approach ultimately produced functional local governments. Desimir Petković was once again chosen as mayor of Zvečan.

The Serb community of Zvečan generally participated in the 2002 Kosovan local elections overseen by UNMIK and the Organization for Security and Co-operation in Europe (OSCE).

==== Peć District ====
Local elections were held in all five municipalities of the Peć District. The Socialist Party of Serbia won majority victories in all jurisdictions.

===== Peć =====
Results of the election for the Municipal Assembly of Peć:

Party	Votes	%	Seats
Socialist Party of Serbia	16,751	96.15	43
Zajedno (Coalition Together)	632	3.63	–
Yugoslav Left	39	0.22	–
Total	17,422	100.00	43
Valid votes	17,422	91.21	
Invalid/blank votes	1,678	8.79	
Total votes	19,100	100.00	
Registered voters/turnout	73,218	26.09	

Note: In the vast majority of Peć's electoral divisions, candidates of the Socialist Party of Serbia were elected without opposition. Only four Zajedno candidates and one Yugoslav Left candidate contested the election.

Miladin Ivanović of the Socialist Party of Serbia served as mayor after the election. He died of natural causes on 13 March 1999, just before the beginning of the NATO bombing of Yugoslavia, and was succeeded by Dragomir Popović, who was presumably also from the Socialist Party.

Following the Kosovo War, Serbia lost effective control over most of Peć, and most of the Serb population fled the area, although the enclave of Goraždevac remained a predominantly Serb community. The Kosovo Liberation Army (KLA) appointed Ethem Çeku as mayor of the municipality in June 1999. Later in 1999, the United Nations Interim Administration Mission in Kosovo (UNMIK) appointed Jose Manuel Sucre as municipal administrator, and Çeku was reassigned as chair of the municipal council. Çeku later joined the Alliance for the Future of Kosovo (AAK). Sucre remained in office as municipal administrator until early 2001.

===== Dečani =====
Results of the election for the Municipal Assembly of Dečani:

Party	Votes	%	Seats
Socialist Party of Serbia	866	96.98	12
Yugoslav Left	16	1.79	1
Zajedno (Coalition Together)	11	1.23	–
Total	893	100.00	13
Valid votes	833	89.19	
Invalid/blank votes	101	10.81	
Total votes	934	100.00	
Registered voters/turnout	26,630	3.51	

Only fourteen candidates contested the election. Thirteen were from the Socialist Party of Serbia–Yugoslav Left alliance, and one was from the Zajedno opposition. Milivoje Đurković of the Socialist Party was chosen as mayor after the election.

Serbia lost control over Dečani after the Kosovo War, and almost all of the area's Serbs fled the area. The Kosovo Liberation Army (KLA) appointed Ibrahim Selmanaj as mayor of the municipality in June 1999. Later in the year, the United Nations Interim Administration Mission in Kosovo (UNMIK) appointed Helinä Kokkarinen as municipal administrator. Online sources do not indicate if Selmanaj also continued to exercise local authority after this time. Selmanaj, in any event, later joined the Alliance for the Future of Kosovo (AAK).

===== Đakovica =====
Results of the election for the Municipal Assembly of Đakovica:

Party	Votes	%	Seats
Socialist Party of Serbia	12,247	91.83	28
Zajedno (Coalition Together)	969	7.27	5
Citizens' Group candidates	77	0.58	–
Yugoslav Left	44	0.33	–
Total	13,337	100.00	33
Valid votes	13,337	97.60	
Invalid/blank votes	328	2.40	
Total votes	13,665	100.00	
Registered voters/turnout	67,170	20.34	

Momčilo Stanojević of the Socialist Party of Serbia was chosen as mayor after the election.

Virtually all of Đakovica's formerly significant Serb community fled the municipality after the Kosovo War. In June 1999, the Kosovo Liberation Army (KLA) appointed Mazllom Kumnova as the municipality's mayor. Kumnova later joined the Alliance for the Future of Kosovo (AAK).

The United Nations Interim Administration Mission in Kosovo (UNMIK) appointed Zamira Eshmambetova as municipal administrator later in 1999, although in practice she had little authority. More so than in other communities, ex-KLA officials remained in control of the local government in the buildup to the 2000 Kosovan local elections.

===== Istok =====
Results of the election for the Municipal Assembly of Istok:

Party	Votes	%	Seats
Socialist Party of Serbia	1,749	45.10	20
Serbian Radical Party	883	22.77	2
Citizens' Group candidates	721	18.59	2
Zajedno (Coalition Together)	525	13.54	2
Total	3,878	100.00	26
Valid votes	3,878	98.90	
Invalid/blank votes	43	1.10	
Total votes	3,921	100.00	
Registered voters/turnout	28,461	13.78	

Incumbent mayor Mališa Perović of the Socialist Party of Serbia was confirmed for another term in office after the election.

Virtually all of Istok's Serb community fled the municipality after the Kosovo War. In June 1999, the Kosovo Liberation Army (KLA) appointed Januz Januzaj as the municipality's mayor. He later joined the Alliance for the Future of Kosovo (AAK).

The United Nations Interim Administration Mission in Kosovo (UNMIK) appointed Martin Dvořák as municipal administrator later in 1999, although Januzaj continued to serve as interim mayor pending new elections.

===== Klina =====
Results of the election for the Municipal Assembly of Klina:

Party	Votes	%	Seats
Socialist Party of Serbia	1,936	55.78	16
Serbian Radical Party	586	16.88	1
Citizens' Group candidates	436	12.56	6
Yugoslav Left	309	8.90	1
Zajedno (Coalition Together)	167	4.81	1
Party of Serbian Unity	37	1.07	–
Total	3,471	100.00	25
Valid votes	3,471	92.83	
Invalid/blank votes	268	7.17	
Total votes	3,739	100.00	
Registered voters/turnout	30,359	12.32	

Sveto Dabižljević, presumably of the Socialist Party of Serbia, served as mayor after the election.

Almost all of Klina's Serb population fled the municipality after the Kosovo War. In June 1999, the Kosovo Liberation Army (KLA) appointed Gani Veseli as the municipality's mayor. He later joined the Democratic Party of Kosovo (PDK).

The United Nations Interim Administration Mission in Kosovo (UNMIK) appointed Emilio Castaneda as municipal administrator later in 1999. Ramadan Krasniqi was appointed as chair of the municipal council at around the same time. Online sources do not indicate if Veseli continued in government. Krasniqi also later joined the PDK.
