= Dušan Narić =

Serbian medical doctor and politician

Dušan Narić (Serbian Cyrillic: Душан Нарић; born 3 July 1942; year of death missing) was a Serbian medical doctor and politician. He served in the National Assembly of Serbia from 1994 to 2001 and was also mayor of Smederevska Palanka for a time. Narić was a member of the Serbian Renewal Movement (Srpski pokret obnove, SPO).

== Early life and private career ==
Narić was born in Niš during the Axis occupation of Serbia in World War II. He trained at the Urology Clinic in Belgrade and later worked for several years at the Stefan Visoki General Hospital in Smederevska Palanka.

== Politician ==
=== First assembly term (1994–97) ===
The SPO contested the 1993 Serbian parliamentary election as part of the Democratic Movement of Serbia (Demokratski pokret Srbije, DEPOS), and Narić received the fifth position on the coalition's electoral list in the Smederevo division. The list won five seats, and he was included in the SPO's delegation when the assembly convened in January 1994. (From 1992 to 2000, Serbia's electoral law stipulated that one-third of parliamentary mandates would be assigned to candidates from successful lists in numerical order, while the remaining two-thirds would be distributed amongst other candidates at the discretion of the sponsoring parties or coalitions. Narić was not automatically elected by virtue of his list position, but he was included in the SPO's delegation all the same.) The Socialist Party of Serbia (Socijalistička partija Srbije, SPS) won the election, and the SPO served in opposition. In the assembly, Narić was a member of the committee for environmental protection.

In 1996, the SPO formed a new alliance with the Democratic Party (Demokratska stranka, DS) and the Civic Alliance of Serbia (Građanski savez Srbije, GSS) called Together (Zajedno). The coalition won historic victories in several cities, including Belgrade and Novi Sad, in the 1996 Serbian local elections. In Smederevska Palanka, Zajedno won a narrow majority victory. The Serbian government, under the authoritarian rule of SPS leader Slobodan Milošević, initially refused to accept most of the opposition's victories, leading to an extended series of protests. In Smederevska Palanka, it was reported that Narić was assaulted by police during a demonstration. The government ultimately accepted the results of the election via a lex specialis, and Narić was chosen as Smederevska Palanka's mayor in early 1997.

=== Second assembly term (1997–2001) ===
The Zajedno coalition collapsed at the republic level in late 1997, and the SPO contested the 1997 parliamentary election on its own. Narić appeared in the lead position on this party's list for the smaller, redistributed Smederevo division and was re-elected when the list won a single seat. The SPS again won the election and afterward formed a new coalition government with the far-right Serbian Radical Party (Srpska radikalna stranka, SRS). The SPO, aside a brief period of co-operation with the administration in 1999, remained in opposition.

The Federal Republic of Yugoslavia, which comprised the republics of Serbia and Montenegro, held the first and only direct elections for the upper house of its parliament, the Chamber of Republics, in September 2000. Narić appeared in the sixteenth position out of twenty on the SPO's list. For this election, half of the mandates were awarded to parties on successful lists in numerical order, while the other half were distributed to candidates at the discretion of the sponsoring parties or coalitions. The SPO won only a single mandate, which automatically went to its lead candidate, the noted architect Spasoje Krunić. Slobodan Milošević was defeated in the concurrent Yugoslavian presidential election, a watershed moment in Serbian and Yugoslavian politics.

The SPO was defeated in Smederevska Palanka in the 2000 Serbian local elections, which took place concurrently with the Yugoslavian vote, and Narić's tenure as mayor came to an end.

The Serbian government fell after Milošević's defeat in the Yugoslavian election, and a new Serbian parliamentary election was called for December 2000. Narić was not a candidate, and his parliamentary term ended when the new assembly convened in January 2001.

=== After 2001 ===
Narić was the ballot carrier for a combined electoral list of the SPO and New Serbia (Nova Srbija, NS) in Smederevska Palanka for the 2004 Serbian local elections. He was not the alliance's candidate for mayor, however, and his name does not appear on a list of local assembly members from September 2005.

A political commentator from Smederevska Palanka noted in 2011 that Narić was deceased.
