= Predrag Čokić =

Serbian politician (born 1940)

Predrag Čokić (Serbian Cyrillic: Предраг Чокић; born 1 December 1940) is a Serbian politician. He was the mayor of the Belgrade municipality of Mladenovac from 1997 to 2000 and served in the Serbian parliament from 1997 to 2001. At different times in his career, Čokić has been a member of the Serbian Renewal Movement (SPO) and the Democratic Party (DS), as well as the leader the local Alliance for the Revival of Mladenovac.

His son, Dejan Čokić, has also served as mayor of Mladenovac.

== Early life and private career ==
Čokić was born in Belgrade, in what was then the Danube Banovina of the Kingdom of Yugoslavia. He was raised in nearby Mladenovac, which was annexed into Belgrade in 1971. He graduated from the Higher School of Economics in Belgrade, majoring in commerce, and worked as a private entrepreneur. Čokić is a founder of the Church of Saint Sava in Belgrade and has received the Order of St. Sava, first degree, from the Holy Synod of the Serbian Orthodox Church.

== Politician ==
=== Serbian Renewal Movement ===
During the 1990s, the political landscape of Serbia was dominated by the authoritarian rule of Slobodan Milošević and the Socialist Party of Serbia (SPS). Čokić was a prominent financial supporter of the opposition Serbian Renewal Movement in the early years after its founding in 1990.

In 1992, the SPO joined a coalition of opposition parties called the Democratic Movement of Serbia (DEPOS). Čokić appeared in the twentieth position on DEPOS's electoral list for the Belgrade constituency in the 1992 Serbian parliamentary election. The list won fifteen seats, and he did not receive a mandate. (From 1992 to 2000, Serbia's electoral law stipulated that one-third of parliamentary mandates would be assigned to candidates from successful lists in numerical order, while the remaining two-thirds would be distributed amongst other candidates at the discretion of the sponsoring parties. Čokić could have been given a mandate despite his list position, but he was not.)

In July 1993, Čokić was attacked and seriously wounded in Belgrade.

He appeared in the twenty-ninth position on the DEPOS list for Belgrade in the 1993 Serbian parliamentary election and was again not given a mandate when the list won eleven seats.

==== Mayor and parliamentarian ====
In 1996, the SPO joined a new opposition coalition called Zajedno, which won significant victories in Belgrade and other major Serbian cities in the 1996 Serbian local elections. The governing SPS initially refused to recognize most victories claimed by Zajedno, but, after an extended period of protests, Slobodan Milošević signed a lex specialis that recognized the opposition's victory in several jurisdictions.

Although the lex specialis did not cover Mladenovac (apparently by an accidental omission), the Zajedno coalition nonetheless managed to form government in the municipality. Zajedno won twenty-seven seats in the municipal assembly, as did the Socialists and their allies in the Yugoslav Left (JUL), while one seat went to an independent. When the assembly convened in early 1997, the independent delegate sided with Zajedno, and Čokić was elected as assembly president, a position that was then equivalent to mayor.

The first period of Čokić's mayoralty was marked by dysfunctionality, due to both divisions in Zajedno and the persistent opposition of the Socialists. In August 1997, the local leader of the Socialists said that he expected the Zajedno administration to become completely unviable and for Čokić to resign. This notwithstanding, Čokić worked through the crisis and remained in office for the full term.

In the 1997 Serbian parliamentary election, Čokić appeared in the seventh position on the SPO's list in the smaller, redistributed division of Voždovac. The list won three seats, and Čokić was given one of the party's "optional" mandates for the division. The Socialist Party's alliance won the election, and the SPO served afterward in opposition at the republic level.

In May 2000, Čokić organized rallies in Mladenovac against Slobodan Milošević's rule.

A new opposition coalition called the Democratic Opposition of Serbia (DOS) was established in 2000; the coalition did not include the SPO. Slobodan Milošević was defeated by DOS candidate Vojislav Koštunica in that year's Yugoslavian presidential election and subsequently fell from power on 5 October 2000, a watershed moment in Serbian politics. The DOS also won majority victories in Belgrade and most of its municipalities in the concurrent 2000 Serbian local elections; in Mladenovac, the DOS won thirty-six seats, the SPS–JUL coalition eighteen, and the SPO only one. Čokić's term as mayor came to an end shortly thereafter. He was also defeated in Mladenovac's first division in the 2000 Belgrade city assembly election.

Čokić was not a candidate in the 2000 Serbian parliamentary election, and his term in office ended when the new assembly convened in January 2001. He ultimately left the SPO.

=== Alliance for the Revival of Mladenovac ===
Čokić subsequently founded a local political movement called the Alliance for the Revival of Mladenovac, led its electoral list in the 2004 Serbian local elections, and was re-elected to the municipal assembly when the list won three seats. The party took part afterwards in a local coalition government with the Democratic Party, the Democratic Party of Serbia (DSS), G17 Plus, and the Strength of Serbia Movement (PSS).

Čokić again led the Alliance for the Revival of Mladenovac list in the 2008 local elections and served in the municipal assembly after the list won five seats. The Alliance again participated in a local coalition government after the election, this time with the Democratic Party and the Democratic Party of Serbia.

On 14 June 2010, the Alliance for the Revival of Mladenovac merged into the Democratic Party. Čokić's son Dejan signed the merger agreement on behalf of the Alliance.

=== Democratic Party ===
In the 2012 Serbian local elections, Dejan Čokić led the Democratic Party's coalition list for Mladenovac and Predrag Čokić appeared in the fourteenth position. The list won nineteen seats, and both were elected. The DS became the dominant party in Mladenovac's coalition government after the election, and Dejan was chosen as the municipality's mayor.

Dejan Čokić was dismissed as mayor in July 2015, and the Serbian government appointed a multi-party provisional governing council pending new elections the following year. Perhaps somewhat unusually, Predrag Čokić was chosen to serve as a member of the council.

In the 2016 Serbian local elections, Dejan Čokić once again led Democratic Party's list for Mladenovac and Predrag Čokić appeared in the seventh position. The list won seven seats, and both were again elected. The Serbian Progressive Party (SNS) and its allies won a majority victory, and the Democrats served in opposition.

The Democratic Party boycotted the 2020 Serbian local elections, and both the father and son's assembly terms ended in that year.

=== Since 2020 ===
Predrag and Dejan Čokić subsequently left the Democratic Party and re-established the Alliance for the Revival of Mladenovac. In early 2024, Predrag Čokić participated in a local meeting against Aleksandar Vučić and Serbia's SNS-led administration.

The Alliance for the Revival of Mladenovac contested the 2024 Serbian local elections as part of a local opposition coalition called the Agreement for Mladenovac. Dejan appeared in the third position on their list and was re-elected when it won seven seats; Predrag appeared in the twenty-third position and was not re-elected. Later in 2024, Dejan Čokić joined the Serbian Progressive Party.

== Electoral record ==
=== Local (City Assembly of Belgrade) ===
2000 Belgrade City Election: Mladenovac Division 1
Candidate	Party	Votes	%
Novica Todorović	Democratic Opposition of Serbia (Affiliation: Democratic Party)		elected
Predrag Čokić	Serbian Renewal Movement		
Goran Starinčević	Serbian Radical Party		
Slobodan Žujović (incumbent)	Socialist Party of Serbia–Yugoslav Left (Affiliation: Yugoslav Left)		
Total			
Source: All candidates except Todorović are listed alphabetically.
