= Bogoljub Zečević =

Serbian politician

- Богољуб Зечевић

Member of the National Assembly of the Republic of Serbia
- In office 22 January 2001 – 27 January 2004

Personal details
- Born: 21 January 1965 (age 61)
- Party: SPO (?–1998); DHSS (1998–?); POKS (current)

Bogoljub Zečević (Serbian Cyrillic: Богољуб Зечевић; born 21 January 1965) is a Serbian politician. He served in the Serbian parliament from 2001 to 2004 as a member of the Christian Democratic Party of Serbia (DHSS). As of 2026, he is the president of the regional board of the Movement for the Restoration of the Kingdom of Serbia (POKS) for the Zlatibor District.

== Early life and career ==
Zečević was born in Užice, in what was then the Socialist Republic of Serbia in the Socialist Federal Republic of Yugoslavia. He is an economist and entrepreneur, and has worked as a housing association manager.

== Politician ==
=== Serbian Renewal Movement ===
Zečević became politically active in 1991. During the mid-1990s, he was a member of the Serbian Renewal Movement (SPO).

The SPO contested the 1996 Yugoslavian parliamentary election as part of the Zajedno (English: Together) coalition, a group of parties opposed to Slobodan Milošević's administration. Zečević appeared in the third position out of four on the Zajedno electoral list for the Užice division; the list won a single mandate, and he was not elected.

Zajedno won a majority victory in Užice in the 1996 Serbian local elections, which took place concurrently with the Yugoslavian vote. Zečević was elected to the city assembly and in December 1996 was appointed to the assembly's executive committee (i.e., the executive branch of the municipal government).

He appeared in the ninth position (out of nine) on the SPO's list for Užice in the 1997 Serbian parliamentary election. The party won two seats in the division, and he was not given a mandate. (From 1992 to 2000, Serbia's electoral law stipulated that one-third of parliamentary mandates would be assigned to candidates from successful lists in numerical order, while the remaining two-thirds would be distributed amongst other candidates at the discretion of the sponsoring parties or coalitions. Zečević could have been assigned the SPO's "optional" mandate despite his list position, but he was not.)

=== Christian Democratic Party of Serbia ===
Four SPO members of the Užice city assembly, including Zečević, left the party in late 1998 to join the Christian Democratic Party of Serbia. Zečević later became president of the party's municipal committee for Užice.

In 2000, the DHSS joined the Democratic Opposition of Serbia (DOS), a broad and ideologically diverse coalition of parties opposed to Milošević's continued rule. DOS candidate Vojislav Koštunica defeated Milošević in the 2000 Yugoslavian presidential election, and Milošević fell from power on 5 October 2000. Serbia's government also fell after Milošević's defeat in the Yugoslavian vote, and a new Serbian parliamentary election was scheduled for December 2000. Prior to the vote, Serbia's electoral laws were changed such that the entire country became a single at-large electoral district and all mandates were assigned to candidates on successful lists at the discretion of the sponsoring parties or coalitions, irrespective of numerical order.

Zečević appeared in the ninety-second position on the DOS's electoral list in the 2000 Serbian election and was assigned a mandate after the list won a landslide majority victory with 176 out of 250 seats. He took his seat when the assembly convened in January 2001. In parliament, he served on the committee for trade and tourism and the committee for relations with Serbs abroad.

The DHSS left the DOS alliance in 2002 and contested the 2003 Serbian parliamentary election as the main party in a coalition called Independent Serbia. Zečević appeared in the twenty-eighth position in the coalition's electoral list. The list fell below the electoral threshold for assembly representation, and his term ended when the new assembly convened in January 2004.

In the 2004 Serbian local elections, Zečević led a coalition electoral list of the DHSS and the Labour Party of Serbia (LPS) in Užice. This list, too, fell below the electoral threshold.

Serbia's electoral laws were reformed again in 2011, such that all mandates in elections held under proportional representation were assigned to candidates on successful lists in numerical order. Zečević was a nominal candidate in the 2016 Serbian local elections in Užice, appearing in the twenty-second position (out of twenty-three) on an independent list called "For Change." The list did not cross the electoral threshold.

=== Movement for the Restoration of the Kingdom of Serbia ===
Zečević later joined the Movement for the Restoration of the Kingdom of Serbia and became president of the party's board for the Zlatibor District. In 2021, the POKS joined a coalition called the National Democratic Alternative (NADA). Zečević appeared in the 156th position on the coalition's list in the 2023 Serbian parliamentary election; election from this position was not a realistic prospect, and was not elected when the list won thirteen seats.

The POKS formed a coalition with the Dveri and the People's Party (Narodna) for the 2024 Serbian local elections in Užice, and Zečević appeared in the second position on the coalition's list, which fell below the electoral threshold.
