= Aleksandra Joksimović =

Serbian politician, academic, pianist, and diplomat

Aleksandra Joksimović (Serbian Cyrillic: Александра Јоксимовић; 20 June 1963) is a politician, academic, pianist, and diplomat in Serbia. She has held high political office in the Federal Republic of Yugoslavia and the Republic of Serbia, and since 30 November 2018 she has served as Serbia's ambassador to Great Britain.

== Early life and career ==
Joksimović was born in Belgrade, in what was then the Socialist Republic of Serbia in the Socialist Federal Republic of Yugoslavia. She graduated as a pianist from the Faculty of Musical Arts at the University of Arts in Belgrade (1985) and worked as head of the piano department at the High School of Music Talent Dr. Vojislav Vučković until 2000.

== Politician ==
=== During the Miloševic years (1997–2000) ===
Joksimović was elected to the City Assembly of Belgrade in the 1996 Serbian local elections, winning a seat in Stari Grad as a candidate of the Democratic Party of Serbia (Demokratska stranka Srbije, DSS). The 1996 local elections occurred during the authoritarian rule of Slobodan Milošević and his allies; the election in Belgrade was won by the Zajedno (English: Together) coalition, but the Serbian government and the city's election commission initially disputed the results, resulting in large-scale opposition protests. The commission finally accepted the opposition's victory in January 1997, and the assembly was formally constituted in February. Joksimović, one of only two DSS members elected to the city assembly, was also elected to the Stari Grad assembly in a concurrent election at the municipal level.

Not long after the election, she left the DSS to join the rival Democratic Party (Demokratska srbije, DS), one of the parties in the Zajedno coalition. She justified this decision on the grounds that the opposition's main purpose was the overthrow of Milošević's government and that this could only be achieved by unity. Reflecting on this situation in 2001, she said that she had made the correct decision. She became a spokesperson for the DS in 1997 and also briefly served on the board of Studio B.

In July 1997, she announced that the DS and nine other opposition parties would boycott the 1997 Serbian parliamentary election, on the grounds that the government "had done nothing to make election conditions more honest." In the aftermath of the 1999 NATO bombing of Yugoslavia, she took part in several protests against Milošević's government.

As a spokesperson for the DS, Joksimović also made frequent comments on events in the Republika Srpska, the predominantly Serb entity of Bosnia and Herzegovina. She welcomed the victory of the Serb National Alliance in the 1997 Republika Srpska parliamentary election, affirming her party's support for the National Alliance's commitment to "democratization and respect for the constitution and stipulations of the Dayton Agreement."

=== After the fall of Milošević (2000–04) ===
==== City politics ====
Slobodan Milošević was defeated by DSS leader Vojislav Koštunica in the 2000 Yugoslavian president election, a watershed event that brought about large-scale changes in the politics of Yugoslavia and Serbia. Koštunica was a candidate of the Democratic Opposition of Serbia (DOS), a broad and ideologically diverse coalition of parties opposed to Milošević's rule; the DS was one of its constituent members. Joksimović was re-elected to the Belgrade city assembly in the concurrent 2000 Serbian local elections, winning in Stari Grad's fifth division.

==== Parliamentarian ====
In the aftermath of Milošević's defeat, a new Serbian parliamentary election was called for December 2000. Joksimović appeared in the ninetieth position on the DOS's electoral list; the coalition won a landslide majority with 178 out of 250 seats, and Joksimović was awarded a mandate when the assembly met in January 2001. (From 2000 to 2011, Serbian parliamentary mandates were awarded to sponsoring parties or coalitions rather than to individual candidates, and it was common practice for the mandates to be distributed out of numerical order. Joksimović did not automatically receive a mandate by virtue of her list position, but she was nonetheless chosen as a Democratic Party representative within the coalition.) She and several other delegates resigned from the assembly on 12 June 2002, but their resignations were subsequently annulled and their mandates restored on technical grounds.

The DS fielded its own list in the 2003 Serbian parliamentary election, and Joksimović appeared in the twenty-fourth position. The list won thirty-seven seats. She was not, on this occasion, given a mandate, and her term in office ended when the new parliament was constituted in early 2004.

==== Government official ====
In 2001, Joksimović was appointed as an assistant minister in the Yugoslavian ministry of foreign affairs, leading the directorate-general of information, press, and culture. She served in this role until 2004.

She argued against the possible breakup of Yugoslavia into its constituent republics of Serbia and Montenegro in January 2001, arguing that this would jeopardize investments. In May of the same year, she announced that Yugoslavia would need to eliminate eleven of its embassies as a cost-cutting measure.

In 2002, United Nations official Carla Del Ponte charged that Yugoslavian officials were allowing accused war criminal Ratko Mladić to remain at liberty. Joksimović rejected this charge, saying that officials were not aware of Mladić's whereabouts. She welcomed the start of the Srebrenica war crimes trial at the International Criminal Tribunal for the Former Yugoslavia (ICTY) the following year, saying that Serbian citizens had been poorly informed about the 1995 Srebrenica massacre and that the trial would help Serbians come to terms with the events of the Bosnian War.

Joksimović represented Serbia and Montenegro (as Yugoslavia had been renamed by this time) at the thirteenth summit of the Non-Aligned Movement in Kuala Lumpur in February 2003. In October of the same year – acting as a representative of the DS rather than in a government capacity – she travelled to São Paulo to officially bring the DS into the Socialist International.

== Turn to academia and research ==
Joksimović stepped aside from her role in government in 2004. Two years later, she earned a master's degree from the University of Belgrade Faculty of Political Science, with a thesis entitled, "US-FRY (Serbia and Montenegro) Relations in the Process of Lifting up Sanctions after 5th October 2000." In the following years, she was a frequent commentator on international affairs in the Serbian media. She became president of the Serbian Centre for Foreign Policy in 2011.

Joksimović has written a number of scholarly essays, primarily on relations between Serbia and the United States of America.

== Diplomat ==
Joksimović was appointed as Serbia's ambassador to Great Britain in 2018, officially taking the office in November. She is also Serbia's non-resident ambassador to Ireland.

== Electoral record ==
=== Local (City Assembly of Belgrade) ===
2000 City of Belgrade election Stari Grad Division V
Aleksandra Joksimović (incumbent)	Democratic Opposition of Serbia	Elected
Milan Matulović	Citizens' Group: Association of Foreign Currency and Dinar Savers of Yugoslavia	
Đorđe Momirović	Socialist Party of Serbia–Yugoslav Left	
Tihomir Pavlović	Serbian Radical Party	
Čedomir Radojčić	Serbian Renewal Movement	
