= Miladin Ivanović =

Serbian medical doctor, politician and administrator

Miladin Ivanović (Serbian Cyrillic: Миладин Ивановић; 23 December 1941–13 March 1999), known as Mile, was a Serbian medical doctor, politician, and administrator. During the 1990s, he was the mayor of Peć, the leader of the Peć District, and a member of Serbian and Yugoslavian parliaments. Ivanović was a member of the Socialist Party of Serbia (SPS) and an ally of Slobodan Milošević.

== Early life and career ==
Ivanović was born to a Kosovo Serb family in Peć during World War II, in what was then the Italian Zone of Occupation in Kosovo, part of the larger Italian protectorate of Albania. After the war, he was raised in the Autonomous Region of Kosovo and Metohija in the People's Republic of Serbia, Federal People's Republic of Yugoslavia. He graduated from the University of Belgrade Faculty of Medicine and practiced as a radiologist.

Matthew McAllester's Beyond the Mountains of the Damned (2003) includes an assertion that Ivanović was known even before the start of his political career for refusing to treat Kosovo Albanian patients and quotes an Albanian resident of Peć describing him as "a bigot and a nationalist."

== Politician ==
Beyond the Mountains of the Damned describes Ivanović as having been the most powerful politician in Peć during the 1990s, a political boss who derived his local authority from his alliance with Milošević. A 1992 article in Der Spiegel described him as presiding over a harsh system of justice directed at the Albanian community. The same article referred to him as "a pleasure-lover, a conversation partner with exquisite politeness and an ardent patriot, but also a man of power and a chauvinist when it comes to the big things - history and future of the Serbian people."

=== Administrator of the Peć District ===
There is conflicting information online as to when Ivanović served as administrator of the Peć District, but he at least held the position in the years immediately after the Federal Republic of Yugoslavia was established, from 1992 to 1994. He was a member of the Socialist Party's central committee in the same period.

=== Parliamentarian (1993–99) ===
Ivanović appeared in the fourth position on the Socialist Party's electoral list for Priština in the 1992 Serbian parliamentary election. From 1992 to 2000, Serbia's electoral law stipulated that one-third of parliamentary mandates would be assigned to candidates on successful lists in numerical order, with the remaining two-thirds distributed to other candidates at the discretion of the sponsoring parties or coalitions. Ivanović was automatically elected to the national assembly when the Socialists won thirteen out of twenty-four seats in the division. In the term that followed, he was a member of the health committee and the committee on relations with Serbs outside of Serbia. He was also appointed as one of the Serbian parliament's twenty representatives to the Chamber of Republics in the Yugoslavian parliament.

The SPS formed a minority government after the 1992 Serbian election and was dependent on informal parliamentary support from the far-right Serbian Radical Party (SRS). The alliance between these parties broke down in mid-1993, and a new Serbian parliamentary election was held in December of that year. Ivanović was given the fifth position on the SPS's list for Priština and was re-elected when the list won a landslide victory with twenty-one of twenty-four seats. The SPS emerged from the election in a stronger position overall and led a stable government in the term that followed. Ivanović held the same committee assignments as before, although in this term the Health Committee was renamed as the Committee on Health, Demographic Policy, and Family. He was not reappointed to the Yugoslavian parliament.

Serbia's electoral divisions were restructured prior to the 1997 parliamentary election. Ivanović led the SPS's list for Peć and was elected to a third term in the national assembly when the list won twelve out of fourteen seats. The SPS formed a new coalition government with the Radical Party and the Yugoslav Left (JUL) after the election, and Ivanović continued to serve as a government supporter. (Before the coalition government was formed, Radical Party delegate Dragan Todorović accused Ivanović of using strong-arm tactics to ensure the Socialist Party's victory in Peć and suggested that he deserved a prison sentence for his actions.)

=== Mayor of Peć ===
The Socialist Party won an overwhelming victory in Peć in the 1996 Serbian local elections, with most SPS candidates winning election unopposed. Ivanović served as the community's mayor after the election. His term in office coincided with the early stages of the 1998–99 Kosovo War. In December 1998, Kosovo Verification Mission leader William G. Walker sent Ivanović a message of condolence after six Serbs were killed by masked gunmen in a Peć café.

Ivanović closed the independent radio station BKTV on 6 May 1997, after the station rejected his demand to stop broadcasting news content.

== Death ==
Ivanović died of natural causes on 13 March 1999, just before the beginning of the NATO bombing of Yugoslavia.
