= Bogoljub Zec =

Serbian politician (born 1937)

Bogoljub Zec (Serbian Cyrillic: Богољуб Зец; born 19 July 1937) is a Serbian former politician. He served two terms in the Serbian parliament and one term in the Vojvodina provincial assembly, and he was the mayor of Temerin from 1996 to 2000. During his political career, Zec was a member of the far-right Serbian Radical Party (SRS).

== Early life and career ==
Zec was born in the settlement of Staro Đurđevo, near Temerin, in what was then the Danube Banovina in the Kingdom of Yugoslavia. He was raised in Temerin in the People's Republic of Serbia, Federal People's Republic of Yugoslavia, after World War II and played football in his youth. Zec taught at the Petar Kočić elementary school in Temerin and served as its director from 1970 until 1987, when he became director of the Ivo Lola Ribar elementary school in nearby Novi Sad.

== Politician ==
=== First parliamentary term (1993–94) and after ===
Zec appeared in the fourth position on the Radical Party's electoral list for the Zrenjanin division in the 1992 Serbian parliamentary election. The party won seven seats in the division, and he was awarded a mandate. (From 1992 to 2000, Serbia's electoral law stipulated that one-third of parliamentary mandates would be assigned to candidates from successful lists in numerical order, while the remaining two-thirds would be distributed amongst other candidates at the discretion of the sponsoring parties. Zec was not automatically elected by virtue of his list position.) After the new assembly met in January 1993, he was appointed to the committee on international relations and the committee on education, physical culture, and sports.

He was also elected to the Temerin municipal assembly in the December 1992 Serbian local elections, which were held concurrently with the parliamentary vote, winning in the municipality's thirteenth division. The Radicals won seven seats out of thirty-one in total. As the oldest delegate, Zec chaired the inaugural meeting of the new assembly on an interim basis before the new mayor was chosen.

The Socialist Party of Serbia (SPS) won the 1992 parliamentary election but fell short of a majority and initially governed in an informal alliance with the Radicals, who were nominally in opposition. At the municipal level in Temerin, the Socialists and Radicals formed a coalition government, and Zec served as a supporter of the administration.

The Socialist–Radical alliance broke down at the republican level in mid-1993, and a new parliamentary election was held later in the year. Zec once again appeared in the fourth position on the Radical Party's list in Zrenjanin. Although the party won four seats in the division, he was not chosen for a new mandate, and his term ended when the new assembly convened in early 1994.

=== Mayor (1996–2000) and further assembly terms ===
Zec was re-elected to the Temerin assembly in the 1996 Serbian local elections. The Radicals won a plurality victory in the municipality with fourteen out of thirty-one seats, while the Democratic Fellowship of Vojvodina Hungarians (VMDK) finished second with thirteen. It was initially unclear which party would dominate the municipal government; when the assembly convened on 9 December 1996, Zec became mayor with the support of the one Socialist Party delegate and the one independent delegate.

He was also elected to the Vojvodina provincial assembly in the 1996 Vojvodina provincial election, winning in the Temerin division in the second round. The Socialists won a majority government, while Zec served in opposition as part of a seven-seat SRS delegation.

In addition, Zec received a second mandate in the Serbian parliament on 15 July 1997 as a replacement for Radomir Popović, who had lost his seat after leaving the Radical Party. Zec officially took his seat the following day. His second parliamentary tenure was brief; he was not a candidate in the 1997 Serbian parliamentary election, and his term ended when the new assembly convened after the vote.

The Radicals remained in power in Temerin for the full 1996–2000 term, and Zec served as mayor throughout this time. On some occasions, the opposition Hungarian delegates voted to keep Zec's administration in power, on the grounds that it was preferable to the Serbian government imposing an interim administration. In 1997, Zec was accused of trying to shift the demographic balance in Temerin by settling Serb refugees from Bosnia and Herzegovina in the predominantly Hungarian areas of Temerin; Zec responded by saying he was proud of providing plots of land to the refugee community. He later remarked of his relationship to the municipality's Hungarian delegates, "I often say jokingly, we are Serbian and you are Hungarian radicals, and we must understand and respect each other."

Zec did not seek re-election to either the provincial assembly or the Temerin municipal assembly in 2000. The Radicals were badly defeated in the latter election, losing all their seats; the Socialist Party–Yugoslav Left (JUL) alliance won fifteen mandates, while the combined opposition won sixteen and formed a new administration. Zec was later re-elected to the assembly in a by-election and served as an opposition member. His last term in the local assembly ended in 2004.

== Electoral record ==
=== Provincial (Vojvodina) ===
1996 Vojvodina provincial election: Temerin
Candidate	Party	First round		Second round	
Candidate	Party	Votes	%	Votes	%
Bogoljub Zec	Serbian Radical Party	3,231	33.18		elected
Milorad Burić	Coalition Together	2,157	22.15		
József Milinszki	Democratic Fellowship of Vojvodina Hungarians	1,715	17.61		
Vladimir Rajić	Socialist Party of Serbia	1,705	17.51		
Vaso Kojić	Yugoslav Left	931	9.56		
Total		9,739	100.00		
Source: Zec, Burić, and Miliszki advanced to the second round.

=== Local (Temerin) ===
1996 Temerin municipal election: Division 13
Candidate	Party	Votes	%
Bogoljub Zec (incumbent)	Serbian Radical Party		elected in the second round
Rade Vajagić	Citizens' Group		defeated in the second round
Mirko Berić	Coalition Together		
Dušan Drobac	Citizens' Group		
Olga Pekez	Socialist Party of Serbia		
Total			
Source: Berić, Drobac, and Pekez are listed alphabetically.

December 1992 Temerin municipal election: Division 13
Candidate	Party	Votes	%
Bogoljub Zec	Serbian Radical Party		elected
other candidates			
Total			
