= Peć District =

Peć District may refer to:

- District of Peć (Kosovo/UNMIK)
- Peć District (Serbia)
