= Serbian Radical Party – Nikola Pašić =

Serbian political party

The Serbian Radical Party – Nikola Pašić (Serbian Cyrillic: Српска радикална странка – Никола Пашић, romanized: Srpska radikalna stranka – Nikola Pašić; abbr. SRS-NP) was a political party in Serbia.

== History ==
The party's origins can be traced to October 1994, when seven Serbian Radical Party deputies in the Assembly of the Federal Republic of Yugoslavia broke away from the party. The leader of the party dissidents, Jovan Glamočanin, initially said that they were "not setting up a new party" but rather acting to dissociate themselves from Radical Party leader Vojislav Šešelj. The immediate cause of the split was the dissidents' support for the Serbian government's temporary blockade of the Republika Srpska, which the Radical Party strongly opposed.

The SNS-NP was officially constituted on 27 January 1995 by a merger of the federal caucus with a number of Radical Party dissidents in the National Assembly of Serbia. Glamočanin was chosen as the party's leader; in his acceptance speech, he accused Šešelj of having betrayed the Radicals.

In July 1995, the SRS-NP issued a statement accusing Radical Party members Stevo Dragišić and Aleksandar Vučić of attacking Glamočanin on a Belgrade street. The party's statement also said that Radicals had attacked SRS-NP parliamentarian Miroslav Dereta, and that three Radicals (Dragišić, Milorad Mirčić, and Igor Mirović) had physically prevented SRS dissident Aleksandar Đurić from entering the national assembly.

Balkan specialist Robert Thomas has written that the SRS-NP group in the federal assembly was widely seen as acting under the influence of the Serbian government and that the party ultimately aligned itself with Slobodan Milošević's administration. In late 1995, Glamočanin praised Milošević for signing the Dayton Agreement and said that he would like to see Milošević succeed Zoran Lilić as president of the Federal Republic of Yugoslavia (which in fact occurred two years later). According to testimony from Glamočanin's former bodyguard, the SRS-NP leader was subsequently induced to support changes to Serbia's electoral laws, and the removal of Dragoslav Avramović as governor of the National Bank of Yugoslavia in Serbia and Montenegro, with gifts of a flat, a luxury car, and fifty thousand German marks.

The party did not win any seats in the 1996 Yugoslavian parliamentary election or the 1997 Serbian general election and ceased to be an important force in Serbian politics after this time.

Glamočanin was succeeded as party leader by Siniša Vučinić in late 1996. In 1998, Vučinić changed the party's name to the Radical Party of the Left – Nikola Pašić.
