= Momčilo Stanojević =

Serbian politician

Momčilo Stanojević (Serbian Cyrillic: Момчило Станојевић; born 1958) is a Kosovo Serb former politician. He served as mayor of Đakovica in the late 1990s and was a member of the National Assembly of Serbia from 1997 to 2001. For most of his time in public life, Stanojević was a member of the Socialist Party of Serbia (SPS).

== Private career ==
Stanojević was born to a prominent local family in Đakovica. He is a graduated engineer.

== Politician ==
=== Mayor of Đakovica (1996–99) ===
The Socialist Party of Serbia won a landslide victory in Đakovica in the 1996 Serbian local elections, and Stanojević was chosen afterward as mayor of the municipality. Relations between Serbs and Albanians in Kosovo were generally poor in this period, and most members of the Albanian community were boycotting Serbia's political institutions in favour of their own parallel structures.

The militant Kosovo Liberation Army (KLA) was particularly active in Đakovica during the 1998–99 Kosovo War. In August 1998, Stanojević said that Serbs and Montenegrins in the area fully supported what he described as "the uncompromising fight against ethnic Albanian terrorism" by the Yugoslav Army and state security. He also said the KLA was losing support in the Albanian community and that many Albanians were requesting foodstuffs from state-owned shops due to exorbitant prices charged by KLA-aligned salesmen. In December 1998, Stanojević said that the KLA had killed one ethnic Albanian police officer working in the municipality and injured another. Đakovica was targeted in the NATO bombing of Yugoslavia, and Stanojević reported significant civilians casualties after one such attack in March 1999.

Human Rights Watch documented a pattern of state violence against ethnic Albanians in Đakovica during the Kosovo War and argued that all evidence pointed to close cooperation between various levels of the Serbian state apparatus. A witness was reported to have asked Stanojević, "What are you doing? Don't you want to live here after this?" Stanojević was, in this recounting of events, said to have responded that his orders were "coming from above."

At Slobodan Milošević's trial at the International Criminal Tribunal for the Former Yugoslavia (ICTY), an ethnic Albanian witness from Đakovica – who was testifying in support of Milošević – said that he and other Albanians had participated in Stanojević's municipal security forces. The witness defended the Serbian state's actions against what he described as the "terrorist" KLA.

Virtually all of Đakovica's significant Serb community, including Stanojević, fled the area at the end of the Kosovo War in June 1999, when KLA forces took control of the community. An article in The Times from this period referred to Stanojević as "a lackey of the Milošević regime" and noted (disapprovingly) that he had built a new Serbian Orthodox church during his mayoral term with municipal funds provided mostly by the majority Albanian community.

Stanojević was for time placed on a list of persons who could not obtain visas for European Union (EU) countries. This occurred during a period of broader sanctions against Milošević's government.

=== Parliamentarian (1997–2001) ===
Stanojević appeared in the third position on the Socialist Party's electoral list for the Peć division in the 1997 Serbian parliamentary election. From 1992 to 2000, Serbia's electoral law stipulated that one-third of parliamentary mandates would be assigned to candidates on successful lists in numerical order, with the remaining two-thirds distributed to other candidates at the discretion of the sponsoring parties or coalitions. Stanojević was automatically elected when the list won twelve seats in the division. The Socialist Party won the election and afterward formed a coalition government with the far-right Serbian Radical Party (SRS) and the Yugoslav Left (JUL), and Stanojević served as a government supporter.

SPS leader Slobodan Milošević fell from power in October 2000, and a new Serbian parliamentary election was held in December of that year. Prior to the election, Stanojević left the SPS and joined Zoran Lilić's breakaway Serbian Social Democratic Party (SSDP). Serbia's electoral system was reformed prior to the election, such that the entire country became a single electoral division. The SSDP did not cross the electoral threshold to win representation in the assembly, and Stanojević's term ended when the new assembly convened in January 2001.

After the Kosovo War, it was reported that Stanojević was building a villa with apartments in Bar, Montenegro.
