= Parliamentary People's Party =

Political party in Serbia

The Parliamentary People's Party (Serbian: Саборна народна странка, romanized: Saborna narodna stranka, abbr. SNS), also known in English as the Assembly National Party, was a political party in Serbia. It emerged in 1994–95 from a split in the Serbian Renewal Movement (SPO).

== Origins ==
The origins of the Parliamentary People's Party can be traced to the December 1992 Yugoslavian parliamentary election, in which the Democratic Movement of Serbia (DEPOS) won twenty mandates in the Chamber of Citizens. Although DEPOS was formally an alliance of several parties, the SPO was by far the most dominant: almost all of the party's seats in the federal assembly were given to members of this party.

In January 1994, eleven of the DEPOS/SPO members of the Chamber of Citizens, operating under the leadership of Slobodan Rakitić, issued an open letter claiming that the SPO had lost sight of its original goals under Vuk Drašković's leadership and was no longer a democratic or representative party. The split was partly predicated on differing views toward Serbian nationalism: while the SPO initially had a strongly nationalist orientation, Drašković was by 1994 a vocal critic of the Bosnian Serb leadership and a prominent advocate of ending the Bosnia War via international diplomacy on the model of the Vance–Owen Peace Plan. Rakitić's group adhered more to the party's original nationalist goals. In June 1994, Rakitić's group organized itself as a political party, which initially retained the DEPOS name.

The SPO expelled the "rebels" from the party soon after the release of their open letter and attempted to withdraw their parliamentary mandates. The federal assembly's mandate and immunity committee initially refused the SPO's request on the grounds that Rakitić and his allies had been elected as DEPOS rather than SPO candidates, but their mandates were indeed terminated in October 1994. As these events were occurring, the governing Socialist Party of Serbia (SPS) and the far-right Serbian Radical Party (SRS) both encouraged the split in the ranks of the SPO for their own tactical purposes.

== Name change, 1996 elections, and dissolution ==
Rakitić's DEPOS group changed its name in January 1995, initially to the People's Parliamentary Party (Narodna saborna stranka, NSS) and later to the Parliamentary People's Party (SNS).

Although the SNS initially attracted a number of former SPO parliamentarians, it was not able to develop a strong base of support. The party contested the 1996 Yugoslavian parliamentary election on its own and fared poorly, winning only 25,156 votes (0.62%) and no seats. It won a single seat in the concurrent 1996 Serbian local elections, in Novi Pazar. The party ceased to be a prominent force in Serbian politics after this time, though it took part in some subsequent discussions about uniting Serbia's opposition parties against Slobodan Milošević's administration. In June 1998, former SPO parliamentarian Dragoljub Živković noted that the SNS was seeking greater cooperation with the Democratic Party of Serbia (DSS).

It is unclear how long the party continued to exist. Rakotić was still the party's leader in 2000. The SNS fielded two candidates in the 2000 Serbian local elections, both in Novi Pazar, although neither was elected. In July 2002, former SPO parliamentarian Radenko Joković was identified as president of the party's board for the Raška District, which includes Novi Pazar. At some time after this, the party dissolved.
