= Stevo Dragišić =

Serbian politician (born 1971)

Stevo Dragišić (Serbian Cyrillic: Стево Драгишић; born 27 September 1971) is a Serbian politician. He served in the National Assembly of Serbia from 1994 to 2004 and was at different times a member of the Assembly of the Federal Republic of Yugoslavia and the Assembly of Serbia and Montenegro, and was mayor of the Belgrade municipality of Zemun from 1998 to 2000. Dragišić is a member of the far-right Serbian Radical Party (Srpska radikalna stranka, SRS)

== Early life and career ==
Dragišić was born in Zemun, Belgrade, in what was then the Socialist Republic of Serbia in the Socialist Federal Republic of Yugoslavia. He attended the University of Belgrade Faculty of Law.

== Politician ==
=== Early years in opposition (1992–98) ===
Dragišić was given the fifth position on the Radical Party's electoral list in Belgrade in the 1993 Serbian parliamentary election. The list won seven mandates, and he was included in his party's delegation when the new assembly convened in January 1994. (From 1992 to 2000, one-third of Serbia's parliamentary mandates were assigned to candidates from successful lists in numerical order, while the remaining two-thirds were distributed amongst other candidates at the discretion of the sponsoring parties and coalitions. Dragišić was not automatically elected by virtue of his list position but was given a mandate all the same.) The Socialist Party of Serbia (Socijalistička partija Srbije, SPS) won the election, and Dragišić served in opposition.

In August 1994, Dragišić protested against an assembly vote on a peace plan to end the Bosnian War by taking the speaker's podium and refusing to leave unless physically removed. The following June, at a SRS rally in Sombor, he called for all Serb lands to unite in a single state as soon as possible, saying, "the day of the liberation of our nation is near, after 50 years of tyranny by Josip Broz and his followers."

Dragišić was elected to both the City Assembly of Belgrade and the Municipal Assembly of Zemun in the 1996 Serbian local elections. The city election was won by Zajedno, an opposition coalition led by the Democratic Party (Demokratska stranka, DS) and the Serbian Renewal Movement (Srpski pokret obnove, SPO). DS leader Zoran Đinđić became the president of the city assembly (a position that was at the time equivalent to mayor), and the Radicals served in opposition. Zemun, by contrast, was the only Belgrade municipality in which the SRS won a majority of seats; party leader Vojislav Šešelj was here chosen as assembly president.

In May 1997, Dragišić announced that the SRS would bring forward a motion to dismiss Đinđić as city mayor. Among other things, he accused the DS leader of allowing the assembly to "illegally" elect a new board of directors for Studio B radio and television. This motion was not successful, but the Zajedno alliance fell apart later in the year, and the SPO was able to form a new city administration via an unofficial alliance with the SPS and SRS. In early October 1997, Dragišić and Aleksandar Vučić were appointed as SRS delegates to the board of Studio B.

Dragišić received the second position (after Vučić) on the SRS's list for the restructured New Belgrade electoral division in the 1997 Serbian parliamentary election and was automatically re-elected when the list won five seats. During this period, the Serbian parliament had the right to nominate twenty of its members to serve in the Yugoslavian assembly's Chamber of Republics; Dragišić was chosen as part of the Radical Party's delegation to the federal chamber in early 1998 and also retained his seat in the republican parliament.

In January 1998, Dragišić was part of a SRS delegation that met with Serbian president Milan Milutinović on the creation of a new government of national unity. Two months later, the SRS joined Serbia's coalition government for the first and only time in its history; the government was led by the SPS and also included the Yugoslav Left (Jugoslovenska Levica, JUL).

=== Government Supporter (1998–2000) ===
Vojislav Šešelj stood down as mayor of Zemun after becoming a deputy prime minister in Serbia's coalition government. Dragišić succeeded him and held the role for the next two years. Vučić and Dragišić resigned from the board of directors of Studio B in May 1998, after the station ran an unflattering program on Šešelj.

Dragišić subsequently argued that a law restricting independent Serbian media (proposed by Vučić later in 1998) was necessary for national security, saying, "Yugoslavia is in a big conflict with terrorists and those who support terrorism. And NATO has been preparing to attack Yugoslavia. But what one cannot know in advance is the readiness of the nation to defend. This is a changeable thing and can be influenced by mass media." After the law was passed, Dragišić was placed on a list of Serbian politicians denied entry into European Union countries.

Generally, Dragišić was one of the SRS's more outspoken members during the Kosovo War and the 1999 NATO bombing of Yugoslavia. In March 1998, he spoke against the prospect of international mediation on Kosovo led by the United States of America, saying, "The United States has always ... supported our enemies, and now it wants to destroy the Serbs. If we accept (U.S.) meditation, we would be signing (our) capitulation." In 1999, he spoke against Serbian participation in the Rambouillet talks, arguing that discussions on the status of Kosovo could ultimately lead to the dismemberment of Serbia. He also described the Americans on one occasion as "Nazis" and was quoted as saying, "The Americans' only goal is to have NATO troops stationed in Kosovo. They do not care about the fate of Kosovo ... All they care about if fulfilling their own national goals."

On the status of Kosovo, he said that Serbia's government was prepared to give broad autonomy to Kosovo Albanians but would not allow the area to have the status of a republic.

In May 2000, Dragišić was appointed to another term in the Chamber of Republics.

=== October 2000 and after ===
SPS leader Slobodan Milošević was defeated by Vojislav Koštunica of the Democratic Opposition of Serbia (DOS) alliance in the 2000 Yugoslavian presidential election, an event that led to wide-ranging changes in Serbian politics. Yugoslavia's first and only direct elections for the Chamber of Republics took place concurrently with the presidential election; Dragišić was not a candidate, and his term in the federal assembly came to an end in October. He was also defeated in his bids for re-election to the Belgrade and Zemun assemblies in the 2000 Serbian local elections, which took place at the same time.

Following Milošević's defeat, a new Serbian parliamentary election was held in December 2000. For this election, the entire country was counted as a single electoral division and all mandates were assigned at the discretion of successful parties or coalitions, irrespective of the numerical order of candidates. Dragišić appeared in the seventh position on the Radical Party's list and was given a new mandate when the party won twenty-three seats. The DOS won a landslide majority, and the SRS served once again in opposition.

In February 2003, the Federal Republic of Yugoslavia was restructured as the State Union of Serbia and Montenegro. The new country had a unicameral legislature whose members were chosen by the republican parliaments of Serbia and Montenegro. By virtue of its performance in the 2000 election, the SRS had the right to nominate eight members of the federal assembly; Dragišić was included in his party's delegation. He was not a candidate in the 2003 parliamentary election, and his terms in the republican and federal assemblies ended in early 2004.

Serbia introduced a system of proportional representation for local elections after 2000. Dragišić appeared on the SRS's lists for Belgrade and Zemun in the 2004 Serbian local elections; he took a seat in the latter assembly but not the former. He was later re-elected to the Zemun assembly in the 2008 local elections. The Radicals won plurality victories in Zemun in both 2004 and 2008 and formed coalition governments in the municipality on both occasions.

The SRS experienced a serious split in late 2008, with several members joining the more moderate Serbian Progressive Party (Srpska napredna stranka, SNS) under the leadership of Tomislav Nikolić and Aleksandar Vučić. Dragišić remained with the Radicals. He was the party's nominee for mayor of Zemun in a special off-year election in 2009; the Radicals were defeated, and he served in the local assembly afterward as an opposition member. He was not a candidate for re-election in 2013 and has not returned to political life since this time.

In 2018, it was reported that Dragišić owned a five per cent stake in Vojislav Šešelj's Velika Srbija publishing firm.

== Electoral record ==
=== Local (City Assembly of Belgrade) ===
2000 City of Belgrade election Zemun Division IX
Stevo Dragišić (incumbent)	Serbian Radical Party	
Milan Drašković	Serbian Renewal Movement	
Veselin Ražnatović	Democratic Opposition of Serbia	Elected
Decimir Stanojević	Socialist Party of Serbia–Yugoslav Left	
