= 1996 Yugoslavian parliamentary election =

Parliamentary elections were held in the Federal Republic of Yugoslavia on 3 November 1996. A coalition of the Socialist Party of Serbia, the Yugoslav Left and New Democracy emerged as the largest bloc in the Federal Assembly, winning 64 of the 138 seats. Radoje Kontić, member of the Montenegrin ruling party, the Democratic Party of Socialists of Montenegro, was confirmed as Prime Minister of the Federal Republic of Yugoslavia. He was replaced, in 1998, by Momir Bulatović, leader of Socialist People's Party of Montenegro.

== Results ==
Party	Votes	%	Seats	+/–
Serbia
Left Coalition (SPS–JUL–ND)	1,848,669	45.41	64	+17
Coalition Together	969,296	23.81	22	–
Serbian Radical Party	764,430	18.78	16	–14
Alliance of Vojvodina Hungarians	81,311	2.00	3	New
List for Sandžak	62,111	1.53	1	New
Vojvodina Coalition	57,645	1.42	2	+1
Serbian Radical Party – Nikola Pašić	47,598	1.17	0	New
Democratic Fellowship of Vojvodina Hungarians	46,809	1.15	0	–3
United Radical Party of Serbia	26,223	0.64	0	New
Parliamentary People's Party	25,156	0.62	0	New
New Communist Party of Yugoslavia	21,602	0.53	0	0
Natural Law Party	11,856	0.29	0	New
Vojvodina	11,024	0.27	0	New
Party for the Protection of Citizens	7,650	0.19	0	New
Workers' Party of Yugoslavia	6,964	0.17	0	0
Movement for the Protection of Human Rights	6,629	0.16	0	0
Democratic Political Party of Roma	5,638	0.14	0	0
Foreign Currency Savers Party	5,161	0.13	0	New
Universalist Movement	5,153	0.13	0	New
Democratic Alliance of Croats in Vojvodina	4,947	0.12	0	0
Party of Independent Democrats of Serbia	4,817	0.12	0	New
Party of Serbian Unity	4,326	0.11	0	New
Democratic Reform Party of Muslims	4,131	0.10	0	0
League of Communists of Yugoslavia	3,454	0.08	0	New
Association of Foreign Currency and Dinar Savers	2,219	0.05	0	New
Bosniak List of Sandžak	1,420	0.03	0	New
Yugoslav Working Class "Josip Broz Tito"	1,174	0.03	0	New
Progressive Party – Progressives	856	0.02	0	New
Universal Movement – New Order of Raška	557	0.01	0	New
Independents	32,081	0.79	0	0
Total	4,070,907	100.00	108	0
Valid votes	4,070,907	94.63		
Invalid/blank votes	231,175	5.37		
Total votes	4,302,082	100.00		
Registered voters/turnout	7,141,484	60.24		
Montenegro
Democratic Party of Socialists of Montenegro	146,221	50.88	20	+3
People's Party	66,165	23.02	8	+4
Social Democratic Party of Montenegro	26,128	9.09	1	New
Party of Democratic Action of Montenegro	12,327	4.29	1	+1
Serbian Radical Party of Montenegro	14,829	5.16	0	–4
Serb Union (SSS–SSJ)	8,287	2.88	0	New
Communists of Montenegro (SKPJ–SKCG–DKP–NKPJ)	5,140	1.79	0	New
Yugoslav Left	3,380	1.18	0	New
Union of Communists of Montenegro	1,292	0.45	0	New
Serbian Democratic Party of Montenegro	1,091	0.38	0	New
Foreign Currency Depositors Party	1,005	0.35	0	New
Serbian National Renewal	918	0.32	0	0
Party of Serbian Unity	624	0.22	0	New
Total	287,407	100.00	30	0
Valid votes	287,407	96.09		
Invalid/blank votes	11,691	3.91		
Total votes	299,098	100.00		
Registered voters/turnout	450,303	66.42		
