= Zoran Mićović =

Serbian mayor

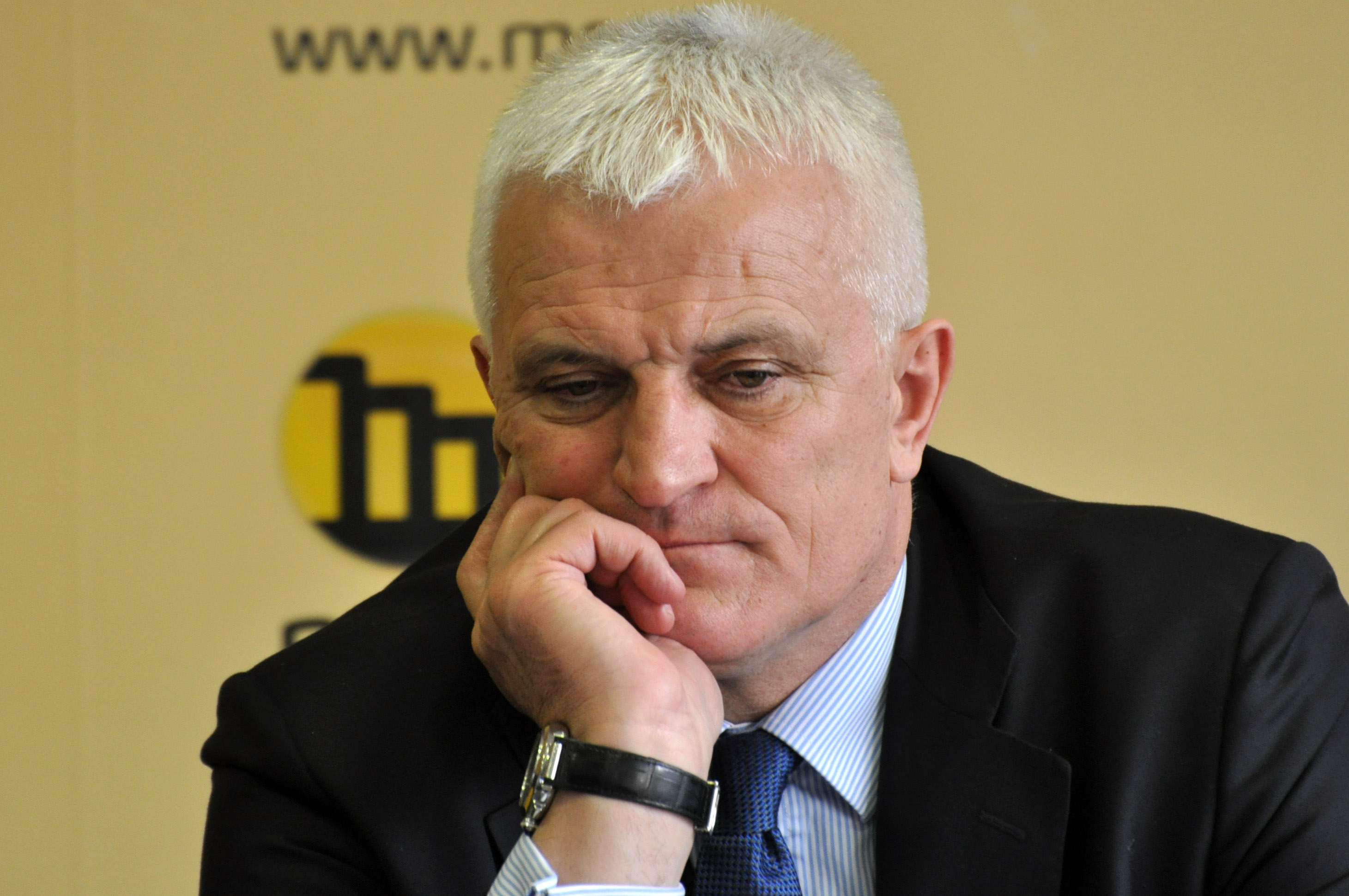
Zoran Mićović

Zoran Mićović is a former mayor of Arilje, Serbia. He is a member of the Democratic Party.

Mićović served in the Serbian parliament in the 2001–04 term.
