= League of Communists of Yugoslavia in Serbia =

League of Communists of Yugoslavia in Serbia Савез комуниста Југославије у Србији Savez komunista Jugoslavije u Srbiji
- President: Mira Tokanović
- Honorary President: Stevan Mirković
- Founded: 1998
- Dissolved: 2010
- Split from: League of Communists – Movement for Yugoslavia
- Headquarters: Belgrade
- Ideology: Communism; Marxism–Leninism; Titoism
- Colors: Red

The League of Communists of Yugoslavia in Serbia (Serbian: Савез комуниста Југославије у Србији, Savez komunista Jugoslavije u Srbiji) was a political party in Serbia. SKJuS emerged as a branch of a refounded League of Communists of Yugoslavia in 1994, following a split from the League of Communists – Movement for Yugoslavia. At its first extraordinary conference, held in 1998, SKJuS declared itself as an independent party.

In 2005 SKJuS co-organized the First Yugoslav Conference of Communist and Workers' Parties, held in Belgrade.

At the second extraordinary party conference, held in April 2008, Mira Tokanovic was elected president of the party. She had previously been the secretary of the party between 1997 and 2008. Stevan Mirkovic is the honorary president of the party.

SKJuS took part in the 2000 parliamentary elections as the 'League of Communists of Yugoslavia in Serbia - Communists of Subotica'. The obtained 2,298 votes (0.05% of the national vote).

SKJuS lost its registration as a political party in 2010 and was re-registered as an organization.
