= Mazllom Kumnova =

Kosovan politician (born 1946)

Mazllom Kumnova (born 17 March 1946) is a former Kosovan politician. He was the interim mayor of Gjakova from 1999 to 2001 and served in the Assembly of Kosovo from 2005 to 2007. Kumnova is a member of the Alliance for the Future of Kosovo (AAK).

== Early life and career ==
Kumnova was born to a Kosovo Albanian family in Gjakova, in what was then the Autonomous Region of Kosovo and Metohija in the People's Republic of Serbia, Federal People's Republic of Yugoslavia. He has a degree in philology and a master's degree in literature teaching methodology. He earned a Ph.D. after the end of his political career.

He was incarcerated by Serbian authorities as a political prisoner in the 1990s and fought with the Kosovo Liberation Army (KLA) in the 1998–99 Kosovo War.

== Politician ==
=== Mayor of Gjakova (1999–2001) ===
The Kosovo Liberation Army entered Gjakova in June 1999 with the departure of Serbian authorities and appointed Kumnova as mayor of the city. The United Nations had agreed to form a civil authority in Kosovo but was still in the process of establishing its institutions at this time. Referring to this, Kumnova said, "With the end of the war, the KLA will form also the civil government. This government will be until we have elections. [...] I notice that the U.N. is going to do this organization of the administration, but they are late. We couldn't leave a vacuum without a government." Shortly thereafter, he added, "There's no reason for an outsider to do what we can do for ourselves. Our people are hard working and self-reliant. We can run our own affairs."

Even after the United Nations Interim Administration Mission in Kosovo (UNMIK) arrived in Gjakova later in the year, Kumnova and ex-KLA soldiers remained in positions of real authority. A November 1999 report in the German media quoted him as saying, sarcastically, "UNMIK has not taken over the municipality, I am horrified by this vacuum."

Perhaps improbably, Kumnova was a founding member of the Party for the Democratic Progress of Kosovo (PPDK) in October 1999. He did not join the successor Democratic Party of Kosovo (PDK), however, but instead became the leader of a local branch of the Alliance for the Future of Kosovo in May 2000.

In May 2000, a court in Serbia sentenced 143 ethnic Albanians from the Gjakova area to long jail terms on charges of terrorism. Kumnova responded by accusing Serbia of "fighting another war against Kosovo."

Kumnova led the AAK's electoral list for Gjakova in the 2000 Kosovan local elections and was elected to the local assembly when the list won seven mandates. The Democratic League of Kosovo (LDK) won a majority government in the city, and Kumnova's mayoral term ended shortly thereafter.

He appeared in the seventeenth position on the AAK's list in the 2001 Kosovan parliamentary election, which was held under closed list proportional representation. The party won eight seats, and he was not elected. He again led the AAK's list for Gjakova in the 2002 local elections and was re-elected when the list won ten seats. The LDK won a second consecutive victory in the city.

=== Parliamentarian (2005–07) ===
Kumnova appeared in the eleventh position on the AAK's list in the 2004 Kosovan parliamentary election. The list won nine seats, and he was not immediately elected. The LDK won the election and afterward formed a coalition government with the AAK. Some AAK delegates resigned their seats to take positions in government, and Kumnova received an assembly mandate as a replacement delegate in 2005. He served on the budget and finance committee.

Kosovo adopted a system of open list proportional representation prior to the 2007 Kosovan parliamentary election. Kumnova was given the twenty-ninth position on the AAK's list and finished thirty-seventh among its candidates. The list won ten seats, and he was not elected.

=== Since 2007 ===
Kumnova appeared in the one-hundredth position on the AAK's electoral list in the 2014 Kosovan parliamentary election and finished seventy-ninth among its candidates. The list won eleven seats, and he was again not elected.

In 2021, he was chair of the steering committee of the University "Fehmi Agani" in Gjakova.
