= 1996–1997 Serbian protests =

1996–1997 protests in Serbia
- Part of the 1996 Serbian local elections
- Students marching in Belgrade in November 1996, carrying the "Belgrade is the world" banner
- Date: 17 November 1996 – 22 March 1997 (4 months and 5 days)
- Location: Belgrade; Niš; Novi Sad; Kragujevac
- Caused by: Refusal of incumbent parties to recognize 1996 local elections results
- Goals: Recognition of the 1996 local election results
- Methods: Demonstrations; Occupations; Rioting; Police violence
- Result: 1996 local election results were recognized

Parties
(Serbia) Anti-government protesters: Student and civilian protesters; Opposition parties: Coalition Zajedno (Together); Serbian Renewal Movement^{2}; Civic Alliance of Serbia; Democratic Party; Democratic Party of Serbia	(Federal Republic of Yugoslavia) Government of FR Yugoslavia: State Security Directorate; Police of Serbia; Government parties: Socialist Party of Serbia^{1}; Yugoslav Left

Lead figures
Vuk Drašković; Vesna Pešić; Zoran Đinđić	Slobodan Milošević; Mirjana Marković; Nebojša Čović

Number
Up to 500,000 in Belgrade; Up to 150,000 in Niš	From 30,000 up to 50,000 in Belgrade

Casualties and losses
1 protester killed	

In the winter of 1996–1997, university students and Serbian opposition parties organized a series of peaceful protests in the Republic of Serbia (then part of the Federal Republic of Yugoslavia) in response to electoral fraud attempted by the Socialist Party of Serbia of President Slobodan Milošević after the 1996 local elections.

During the course of the rallies, students held their protests separately from the citizens' ones, led by opposition then gathered in coalition Zajedno (Together). The students' protest lasted until 22 March 1997, with additional requests of replacing the management of University of Belgrade and return of the university autonomy.

The protests started on 17 November 1996 in Niš where thousands of opposition supporters gathered to protest against election fraud. Belgrade University students joined on 19 November 1996 and protests lasted even after 11 February 1997, when Milošević signed the "lex specialis", which accepted the opposition victory and instated local government in several cities, but without acknowledging any wrongdoing. The protests were strongest in the capital Belgrade, where they gathered up to 200,000 people, but spread over most cities and towns in Serbia.

== Counter-protests ==
On 24 December 1996 the government coalition called "Za Srbiju" ("For Serbia") organized a large counter-protest in Terazije. Milošević spoke to the crowd in Terazije, telling them "Serbia will not be controlled by someone else's hand". The crowd chanted "Slobo, we love you", to which Milošević replied, "I love you too".

The 24 December protests in Terazije resulted in massive riots, during which a young protester from the SPO named Predrag Starčević was beaten to death. Another SPO protester, Ivica Lazović, was shot in the head the same night by a SPS supporter Živko Sandić. Although Lazović survived, he ended up with an arm and a leg paralyzed after a life-saving operation in the emergency room. Lazović eventually met Sandić in court, where he asked him, "brother, why did you shoot me?" Sandić allegedly replied, "I don't know", and Lazović forgave him in person, saying "if my sacrifice was needed to prevent civil war in Serbia, then so be it."

After the 24 December violence the government banned all street protests in Belgrade from 26 December 1996. Nebojša Čović, the mayor of Belgrade and an SPS member, claimed to have criticized the government's idea of counter-protesting, but that a majority of the SPS party board supported it. Milošević allegedly ordered police to stay disengaged from the counter-protest. Čović suggested to other SPS members that the counter-protest was risky, and defied Milošević's orders by calling in riot police. Čović was subsequently kicked out of the SPS in January 1997. He stood by his decision years later, claiming that civil war could have begun if it were not for the intervention of riot police that night.

== Protest on Branko's Bridge ==
On the night of 2–3 February 1997 a confrontation occurred between riot police and protesters on Branko's Bridge, during which the police fired water cannons at the protesters, even though the outside temperature was −6 °C (21 °F). Vesna Pešić, leader of the Civic Alliance of Serbia, was hit by the police on the same night. According to Naša Borba, 29 protesters ended up in the Urgent Care emergency room, while the "Anlave" clinic received 50 patients that night. After the incident, Yugoslav Left spokesman Aleksandar Vulin said: "They complain that the police used water cannons on the protesters at −10 °C. Well, they're not going to pour hot water on them, are they?"

== Kolarčeva street protest and the Serbian Orthodox Church ==
In January 1997, a large column of riot police blocked off Kolarčeva street in Belgrade for several weeks, in spite of the continuation of a standoff with the student protesters. However, on 27 January 1997 the riot police opened Kolarčeva street, after which Patriarch Pavle and other members of the Serbian Orthodox clergy led a silent crowd of approximately 300,000 to the Church of Saint Sava. Contrary to what was reported at the time, the riot police left Kolarčeva street several hours before, as they anticipated the Patriarch and the crowd he would take to the Church of Saint Sava.

== Alleged role of the internet ==
In early 1997, Wired journalist David Bennahum met philosophy professor Novica Milić at a conference in Berlin called the "Data Conflicts: Cyberspace and the Geo-Politics of Eastern Europe", after which Milić invited him to apply for a visa to visit Yugoslavia during the protests. Bennahum applied, eventually entered Yugoslavia and wrote about his experience and the alleged role of the internet in the protest mobilization in an article called "The Internet Revolution". Bennahum wrote about the existence of an internet stream called Sezam Pro, which broadcast the independent radio station B92 after it had been censored by the Yugoslav government on 3 December 1996. Voice of America and BBC recorded these internet streams and broadcast them back to Belgrade through short-wave frequencies, whose signals were picked up by the radio. At the time of the protests, at least 8 million people were living in Yugoslavia, of which no more than 10,000 had access to the internet. Speaking to Nedeljnik, Milan Božić, a math professor who met with Bennahum to discuss internet access in Yugoslavia, claimed that Bennahum endangered him and Milić by publishing their names in his article, adding that there had been an agreement to keep their identities hidden from the authorities. Milić also commented for Nedeljnik, stating that Bennahum "severely exaggerated" the role of the internet in the 1996–1997 protests.

== Reactions ==
Richard Holbrooke commented on the issue in his memoirs, recalling that the Americans were not able to support the protests due to the transitional period to the Clinton II Administration:

"A remarkable challenge to Milošević unfolded in the street of Belgrade in December [1996], led by three politicians who banded together in a movement called Zajedno, or the Together Movement. For weeks, hundreds of thousands of Belgrade citizens braved subfreezing weather to call for democracy. But Washington missed a chance to affect events; except for one ineffectual trip to Washington, Zajedno had no contact with senior American government officials, and the Administrations sent no senior officials to Belgrade for fear that their visits would be used by Milošević to show support. For the first time in eighteen months, Milošević felt no significant American pressure, and turned back towards the extreme nationalists, including Karadžić, for support. His tactical skills saved him again, and within weeks, the Together Movement was together no more, as its leaders split among themselves."

== See also ==
- Anti-bureaucratic revolution
- March 1991 protests in Belgrade
- Overthrow of Slobodan Milošević

== Notes ==
- ^1 The Socialist Party of Serbia is abbreviated as SPS.
- ^2 The Serbian Renewal Movement is abbreviated as SPO, the acronym for the movement's name in Serbian, Srpski pokret obnove.

== Sources ==
- Chris Hedges (8 December 1996). "Serbian Response to Tyranny: Take the Movement to the Web". The New York Times. Archived from the original on February 20, 2006.
- Milan Milošević (15 February 1997). "What Now?". Vreme. Archived from the original on 22 June 2008.
- Balkan Peace Team (23 January 1997). "Protests in Belgrade and throughout Yugoslavia—1996/1997". Hartford Web Publishing. Archived from the original on 4 May 2007.
- Lazić, Mladen (1999). Protest in Belgrade: Winter of Discontent. Central European University Press. ISBN 963-9116-45-9.
