= Peć District (Serbia) =

Administrative district of Serbia on the territory of Kosovo

Peć District Пећки округ
- Administrative district of Serbia
- Location of Peć District
- Country: Serbia
- Province: Kosovo and Metohija
- Administrative center: Peć

Area
  - Total: 2,459 km^{2} (949 sq mi)
- ISO 3166 code: RS-26
- Municipalities: 5

The Peć District (Serbian: Пећки округ, romanized: Pećki okrug, pronounced [pêːt͡ɕkiː ôkruːɡ]) was administrative district of Serbia between 1992 and the end of the Kosovo War in 1999. The administrative center of the Peć District was the city of Peć. From the Serbian state official point of view, the district continues to be part of Serbia.

== Municipalities ==
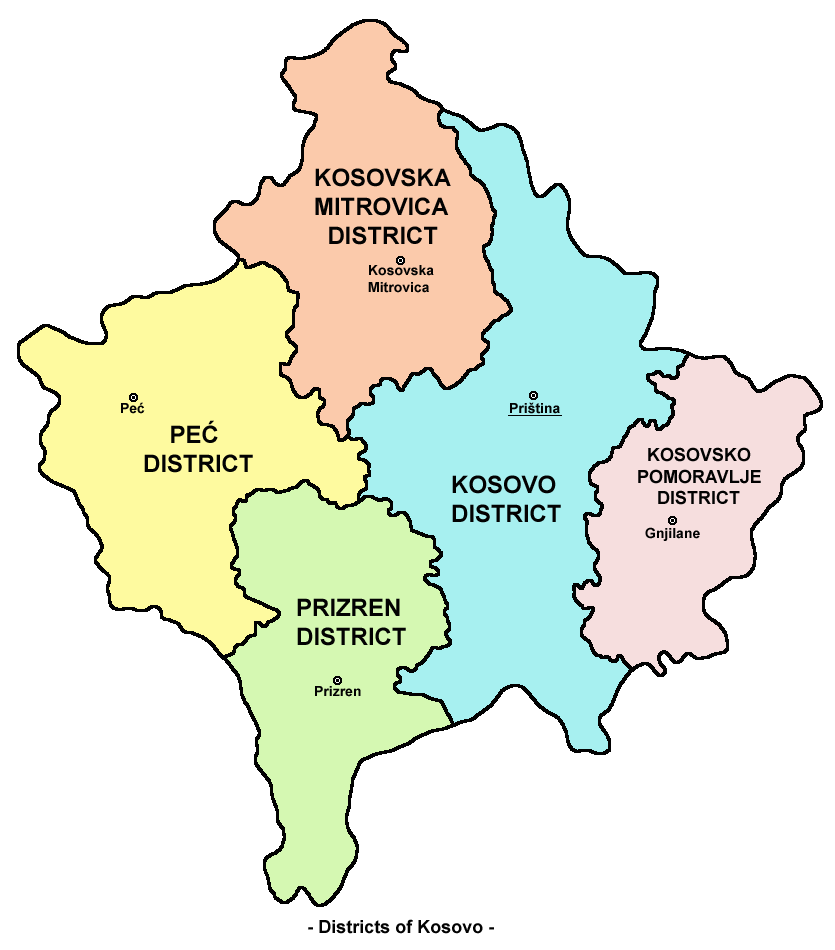
Map of administrative districts of Serbia on the territory of Kosovo

The Peć District encompassed the territories of five municipalities:

- Dečani (municipality)
- Đakovica (municipality)
- Istok (municipality)
- Klina (municipality)
- Peć (municipality)
