= Coalition Together =

Coalition Together Коалиција Заједно Koalicija Zajedno
- Abbreviation: Zajedno
- Leader: Vuk Drašković; Zoran Đinđić; Vojislav Koštunica; Vesna Pešić
- Founded: 2 September 1996
- Dissolved: 1997
- Succeeded by: Alliance for Change
- Headquarters: Belgrade
- Political position: Big tent

Coalition Together (Serbian: Коалиција Заједно, romanized: Koalicija Zajedno) was a major opposition coalition in Serbia and FR Yugoslavia between 1996 and 1997. Coalition members were Serbian Renewal Movement, Democratic Party, Civic Alliance of Serbia and Democratic Party of Serbia. They participated in 1996 Yugoslavian parliamentary election finishing second and winning nearly 24% of votes.

Coalition also took part in 1996 Serbian local elections and won most of the largest cities, including Belgrade, Niš, Novi Sad, Kragujevac, and more than 40 municipalities. This was first major blow to Slobodan Milošević's regime since he took power in 1989. Large protests erupted after Milošević refused to accept electoral defeat.

Coalition Together eventually fell apart after conflict between the two leaders, Vuk Drašković and Zoran Đinđić.

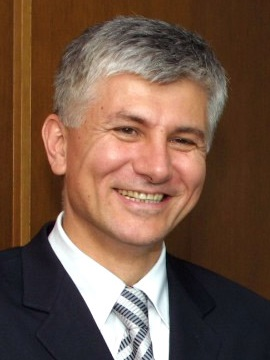
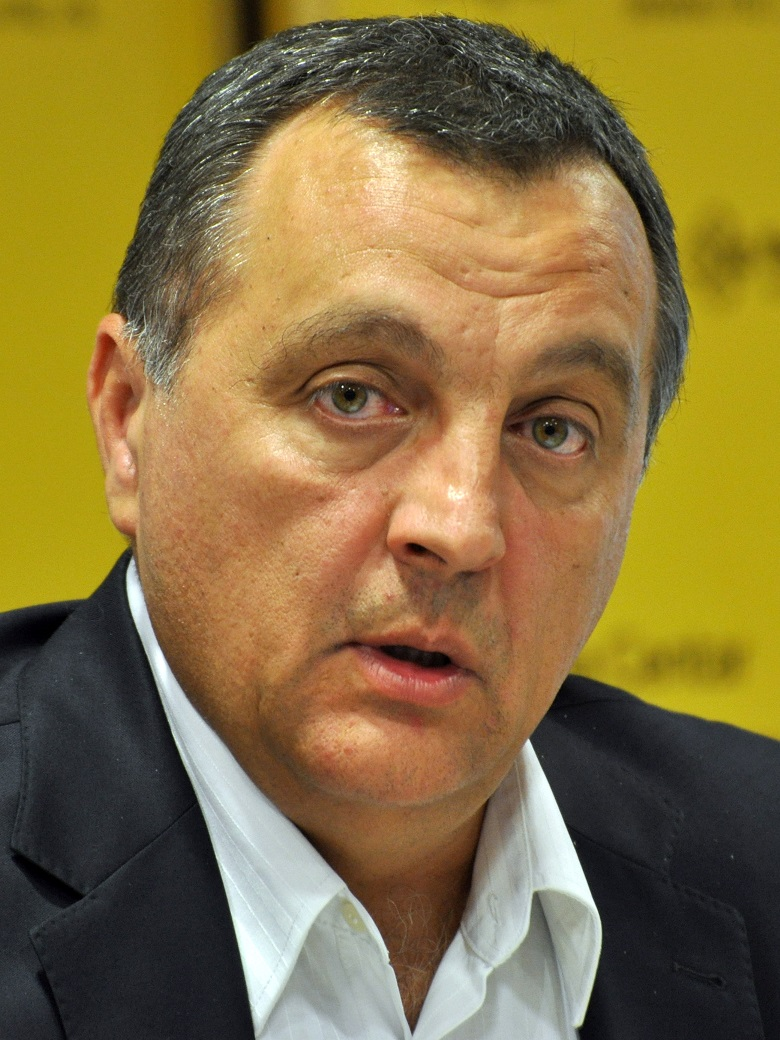
Zoran Đinđić and Zoran Živković became mayors of Belgrade and Niš after 1996 election dealing biggest blow to the regime of Slobodan Milošević since he took power in 1989

== Members ==
Name	Abbr.	Leader	Main ideology	Political position	MPs (Serbia) (Note: Based on 1993 election results where SPO and GSS run jointly as part of DEPOS and DS and DSS run separately)
Serbian Renewal Movement Српски покрет обнове Srpski pokret obnove	SPO	Vuk Drašković	Monarchism National liberalism Anti-communism	Centre-right	37 / 250
Democratic Party Демократска странка Demokratska stranka	DS	Zoran Đinđić	Social liberalism Anti-communism	Centre	29 / 250
Democratic Party of Serbia Демократска странка Србије; Demokratska stranka Srbije	DSS	Vojislav Koštunica	National conservatism Christian democracy	Centre-right	7 / 250
Civic Alliance of Serbia Грађански савез Србије; Građanski savez Srbije	GSS	Vesna Pešić	Liberalism Anti-nationalism	Center	2 / 250

== Electoral performance ==
Federal Assembly
Year	Popular vote	% of popular vote	# of seats	Seat change	Status
1996	969,296	23.77%	22 / 138	▲22	opposition
