= Lex specialis =

Latin legal term

The lex specialis doctrine, also referred to as generalia specialibus non derogant ("the general does not derogate from the specific"), states that if two laws govern the same factual situation, a law governing a specific subject matter (lex specialis) overrides a law governing only general matters (lex generalis). The doctrine, recognized in both legal theory and practice, can apply in both domestic and international law contexts. The name comes from the full statement of the doctrine, a legal maxim in Latin: Lex specialis derogat legi generali.

The doctrine ordinarily comes into play with regard to the construction of earlier-enacted specific legislation when more general legislation is later passed. However, under the "lex posterior derogat legi priori" doctrine, lex specialis would be applied such that the younger specific law overrides the older general law.

It can be assumed that the legislators planned to override the previous legislation. There is also a view that conflicts of norms should be avoided by a systematic interpretation. The principle also applies to construction of a body of law or single piece of legislation that contains both specific and general provisions.

== See also ==
- Statutory interpretation
- International law
