= Ministry of Information and Telecommunications (Serbia) =

Government ministry of Serbia

- Министарство информисања и телекомуникација Ministarstvo informisanja i telekomunikacija

Ministry overview
- Formed: 31 July 1991 (as Ministry of Information); 26 October 2022 (as Ministry of Information and Telecommunications)
- Preceding Ministry: Ministry of Culture and Information, Ministry of Trade, Tourism, and Telecommunications
- Jurisdiction: Government of Serbia
- Minister responsible: Boris Bratina

The Ministry of Information and Telecommunications (Serbian: Министарство информисања и телекомуникација, romanized: Ministarstvo informisanja i telekomunikacija) is a ministry in the Government of Serbia which is in the charge of the mass media regulation and telecommunications.

The Ministry of Information was established on 31 July 1991, and in 2001 it was merged into the Ministry of Culture.

The Ministry of Culture was reorganized several times between 2001 and 2022, and the ministry's official designation frequently included reference to Information, Public Information, and Media. From 2014 to 2022, it was known as the Ministry of Culture and Information.

The Ministry of Culture and the Ministry of Information were separated in 2022, at which time the latter ministry also received responsibility for telecommunications. Boris Bratina has served as minister since 16 April 2025.

== List of Ministers of Information (and Media) ==
Political Party: SPS SRS SPO DOS DS G17+ SNS n-p

No.	Portrait	Minister	Took office	Left office	Time in office	Party	Cabinet
Minister of Information
1	Ratomir Vico	Ratomir Vico (1941–2005)	31 July 1991	23 December 1991	145 days	SPS	Zelenović
2	Milivoje Pavlović	Milivoje Pavlović (born 1947)	23 December 1991	18 March 1994	2 years, 85 days	SPS	Božović; Šainović; Marjanović I
3	Ratomir Vico	Ratomir Vico (1941–2005)	18 March 1994	28 May 1996	1 year, 71 days	SPS	Šainović
4	Aleksandar Tijanić	Aleksandar Tijanić (1949–2013)	28 May 1996	17 December 1996	4 years, 203 days	SPS	Marjanović I
5	Radmila Milentijević	Radmila Milentijević (born 1945)	17 December 1996	24 March 1998	2 years, 268 days	SPS	Marjanović II
6	Aleksandar Vučić	Aleksandar Vučić (born 1970)	24 March 1998	24 October 2000	2 years, 268 days	SRS	Marjanović II
7a	Ivica Dačić	Ivica Dačić (born 1966); Co-Minister	24 October 2000	25 January 2001	93 days	SPS	Minić
7b	Biserka Matić Spasojević	Biserka Matić Spasojević (born 1937); Co-Minister	24 October 2000	25 January 2001	93 days	DOS	Minić
7c	Bogoljub Pejčić	Bogoljub Pejčić (born 1936); Co-Minister	24 October 2000	25 January 2001	93 days	SPO	Minić
Minister of Culture and Public Information
1	Branislav Lečić	Branislav Lečić (born 1955)	23 May 2002	2 April 2003	314 days	DS	Đinđić; Živković
Minister of Culture and Media
1	Branislav Lečić	Branislav Lečić (born 1955)	2 April 2003	3 March 2004	337 days	DS	Živković
Minister of Culture, Media, and the Information Society
1	Predrag Marković	Predrag Marković (born 1955)	14 March 2011	27 July 2012	1 year, 135 days	G17+	Cvetković
Minister of Culture, Information, and Diaspora
1	Bratislav Petković	Bratislav Petković (1948–2021)	27 July 2012	2 September 2013	1 year, 37 days	SNS	Dačić
2	Ivan Tasovac	Ivan Tasovac (1966–2021)	2 September 2013	27 April 2014	237 days	Independent	Dačić
Minister of Culture and Information
1	Ivan Tasovac	Ivan Tasovac (1966–2021)	27 April 2014	11 August 2016	2 years, 106 days	Independent	Vučić (I)
2	Vladan Vukosavljević	Vladan Vukosavljević (born 1962)	11 August 2016	28 October 2020	4 years, 78 days	Independent	Vučić (II); Brnabić (I)
3	Maja Gojković	Maja Gojković (born 1963)	28 October 2020	26 October 2022	1 year, 363 days	SNS	Brnabić (II)
Minister of Information and Telecommunications
1	Mihailo Jovanović	Mihailo Jovanović (born 1972)	26 October 2022	2 May 2024	1 year, 189 days	SNS	Brnabić (III)
2	Dejan Ristić	Dejan Ristić (born 1972)	2 May 2024	16 April 2025	349 days	Independent	Vučević
3	Boris Bratina	Boris Bratina (born 1960)	16 April 2025	Incumbent	1 year, 167 days	Independent	Macut

== List of Ministers of Telecommunications (2001–2022) ==
Political Party: DS G17+ SDPS

No.	Portrait	Minister	Took office	Left office	Time in office	Party	Cabinet
Minister of Transport and Telecommunications
1	Marija Rašeta Vukosavljević	Marija Rašeta Vukosavljević (born 1962)	25 January 2001	3 March 2004	3 years, 39 days	DS	Đinđić; Živković
Minister of Telecommunications and the Information Society
1	Aleksandra Smiljanić	Aleksandra Smiljanić (born 1970)	15 May 2007	7 July 2008	1 year, 53 days	DS	Koštunica (II)
2	Jasna Matić	Jasna Matić (born 1964)	7 July 2008	14 March 2011	2 years, 250 days	G17+	Cvetković
Minister of Trade, Tourism, and Telecommunications
1	Rasim Ljajić	Rasim Ljajić (born 1964)	27 July 2012	28 October 2020	8 years, 93 days	SDPS	Dačić; Vučić (I); Vučić (II); Brnabić (I)
2	Tatjana Matić	Tatjana Matić (born 1972)	28 October 2020	26 October 2022	1 year, 363 days	SDPS	Brnabić (II)
