= Boris Bratina =

Serbian academic (born 1960)

- Борис Братина
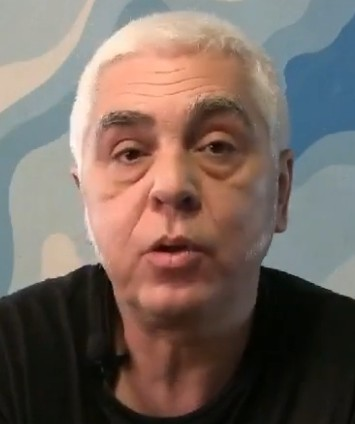
- Bratina in 2020

Minister of Information and Telecommunications
- Incumbent
- Assumed office 16 April 2025
- Prime Minister: Đuro Macut
- Preceded by: Dejan Ristić

Personal details
- Born: 25 August 1960 (age 66) Belgrade, PR Serbia, FPR Yugoslavia
- Party: Independent
- Other political affiliations: People's Movement for the State
- Education: University of Belgrade
- Occupation: Academic
- Profession: Philosopher

Boris Bratina (Serbian Cyrillic: Борис Братина; born 25 August 1960) is a Serbian university professor and philosopher serving as the Minister of Information and Telecommunications since 16 April 2025. An associate professor at the Faculty of Philosophy of the University of Priština in North Mitrovica, he specializes in contemporary philosophy and ontology. A former member of the ultranationalist SNP Naši 1389, he is a founding member of the People's Movement for the State (PZND) of Serbia's president Aleksandar Vučić.

== Minister of Information and Telecommunications ==
On 4 April 2026, which is celebrated as the Day of Students of the University of Belgrade, Bratina said that students should know that the police "has the right to beat and kill them" (ima pravo da ih bije i da ih ubije).

== Controversies ==
On 24 March 2009, during a rally in Belgrade marking the 10th anniversary of NATO bombing of Serbia, Bratina, alongside Miša Vacić, publicly burned the European Union flag. Bratina has been criticized for homophobic statements, notably in 2010, when he called the Belgrade Pride a "procession of the sick" and urged its ban. He described homosexuality as "exhibitionism" and suggested shaming participants publicly.
