= Jelena Katić =

Serbian politician

Jelena Katić (Serbian Cyrillic: Јелена Катић; born 15 November 1992), formerly known as Jelena Jović, is a politician in Serbia. She has served in the National Assembly of Serbia since 6 October 2021 as a member of the Serbian Progressive Party (Srpska napredna stranka, SNS).

== Private career ==
Katić is a mathematics teacher from Vlasotince in southern Serbia.

== Politician ==
Katić was given the 202nd position on the SNS's Aleksandar Vučić — For Our Children electoral list in the 2020 Serbian parliamentary election and missed direct election when the list won 188 out of 250 mandates. She was awarded a mandate on 6 October 2021 in place of Ivan Tasovac, who had died a week earlier.

She also received the fourth position on the Progressive Party's list for the Vlasotince municipal assembly in the 2020 Serbian local elections, which took place concurrently with the national assembly election, and was elected when the list won a majority victory with twenty-seven out of forty-five seats.
