= Dejan Ristić (historian) =

Serbian historian, administrator, and politician

- Дејан Ристић
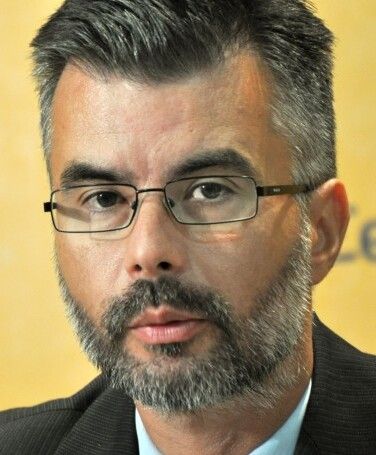
- Dejan Ristić, 2010

Minister of Information and Telecommunications
- In office 2 May 2024 – 16 April 2025
- Prime Minister: Miloš Vučević
- Preceded by: Mihailo Jovanović
- Succeeded by: Boris Bratina

Member of the National Assembly of the Republic of Serbia
- In office 6 February 2024 – 1 May 2024

Personal details
- Born: 20 April 1972 (age 54) Belgrade, SR Serbia, SFR Yugoslavia
- Education: University of Belgrade

Dejan Ristić (Serbian Cyrillic: Дејан Ристић; born 20 April 1972) is a Serbian historian, administrator, and politician. He was Serbia's minister of information and telecommunications from 2 May 2024 to 16 April 2025.

== Early life and academic career ==
Ristić was born in Belgrade, in what was then the Socialist Republic of Serbia in the Socialist Federal Republic of Yugoslavia. He is a graduate of the University of Belgrade Faculty of Philosophy and has taken specialized education in Jerusalem and London on Holocaust research and public administration. His academic work encompasses diplomatic history (including Serbia's relations with the United Kingdom and France), the Holocaust, the culture of memory, and the state's relationship with traditional religious communities in the twentieth century.

He has initiated and coordinated several projects under the auspices of UNESCO and co-authored national installations including "Military memorials and places of suffering from the Second World War" (2011). His book, House of Unburnable Words: National Library of Serbia 1938-1941 (2016), inspired the documentary film Memories from the Ashes. He has also translated several works, including Ian Kershaw's Hitler: 1889–1936 Hubris and Hitler: 1936–1945 Nemesis.

== Administrator ==
Ristić began working in Serbia's ministry of labour in November 2003, where he was responsible for the protection of war memorials and places of suffering, and the culture of remembrance. He was appointed as acting director of the National Library of Serbia in January 2012 and served in this capacity until September 2013.

Rumours circulated in 2013 that Ristić would be appointed as Serbia's minister of culture, but Ivan Tasovac ultimately received the role instead. Ristić instead served as a state secretary in the ministry from 2013 to 2014. He opened an exhibition on the Non-Aligned Movement at Belgrade's Museum of Yugoslavia in June 2014, describing the movement's ideals as "still important and justified."

He applied for the position of director of the National Library in 2019 but was not included on the shortlist of candidates on the technical grounds that he "did not prove that he has at least ten years of work experience in culture, of which at least four years are in leadership positions in a cultural institution." He submitted an objection to this decision.

In 2021, Ristić served on a committee that organized a cultural and artistic program for Victory Day, commemorating the defeat of Nazi Germany in World War II. The program included verses from two songs commonly associated with Dimitrije Ljotić's fascist movement in Serbia. Ristić defended this decision, arguing that the author of the songs had no connection to Ljotić's movement and that the works deserved to be reclaimed from historical misuse. Others questioned Ristić's use of evidence and criticized the inclusion of the songs.

The Serbian government appointed Ristić as director of Belgrade's Genocide Victims' Museum on 12 May 2021. In August of the same year, he sent a public letter to the Jerusalem Post newspaper protesting a recent article by David Goldman, whom Ristić accused of minimizing the number of Serb victims at the Independent State of Croatia's Jasenovac concentration camp during World War II.

== Politician ==
Ristić appeared in the third position on the Serbian Progressive Party's Serbia Must Not Stop electoral list in the 2023 Serbian parliamentary election as a non-party candidate. This was tantamount to election, and he was indeed elected when the list won a majority victory with 129 out of 250 mandates. He took his seat when the assembly convened in February 2024. During his brief assembly term, he was a member of the labour committee (Note: Formally known as the Committee on Labour, Social Issues, Social Inclusion, and Poverty Reduction.) and a deputy member of the education committee, (Note: Formally known as the Committee on Education, Science, Technological Development, and the Information Society.) the European integration committee, and the administrative committee. (Note: Formally known as the Committee on Administrative, Budgetary, Mandate, and Immunity Issues.)

On 30 April 2024, Ristić was designated as minister of information and telecommunications in Serbia's incoming new government under prime minister Miloš Vučević. He resigned his seat in the assembly on the following day and took office as a minister on 2 May.

In September 2024, Ristić announced that a new law on information security was being prepared and that 5G would be introduced to Serbia within a year.

Ristić intended to travel to Gračanica in Kosovo in December 2024 to commemorate the eightieth anniversary of the Serbian language newspaper Jedinstvo. The Republic of Kosovo authorities refused to permit the visit, citing Serbia's recent bans on their officials attempting to enter predominantly Albanian communities in the Preševo Valley area.

In 2025, Ristić and Israeli communications minister Shlomo Karhi signed an agreement between Serbia and Israel on cooperation in the fields of telecommunications and postal services.

Ristić's ministerial term was ultimately brief. Đuro Macut succeeded Vučević as prime minister on 16 April 2025, and Ristić was not included in Macut's ministry.

== Post-ministerial career ==
In May 2025, it was reported that Ristić had been hired to work in Serbia's ministry of foreign affairs without a competition.

== Criticism ==
Danka Mihajlović, a journalist of the Serbian fact-checking website FakeNews Tragač, accused Ristić of plagiarizing her article about a widespread rumor that a certain plaque bearing the words "Be as humane as Serbia was in 1885" is displayed in the hall of the International Committee of the Red Cross in Geneva.

== Books ==
- Zaštita spomen-obeležja iz ratnih perioda (English: Protection of wartime memorials) (2003) co-author
- Memorijali oslobodilačkih ratova Srbije: Pregled spomen-obeležja u zemlji i inostranstvu (English: Memorials of the liberation wars of Serbia : Overview of memorials in the country and abroad), Volume 2 (2005) co-author
- Usud Karađorđeve Srbije: Priča o srpskim Termopilima: bitka na Čegru 1809 (English: The Fate of Karađorđe's Serbia: The Story of Serbian Thermopylae: The Battle of Čegar 1809) (2009)
- Sećajte se mene moji jer me više nema (English: Remember me, my friends, because I'm gone) (2011) co-author
- Kuća nesagorivih reči: Narodna biblioteka Srbije 1838-1941 (English: House of Unburnable Words: National Library of Serbia 1838-1941) (2016, rev. 2019)
- Istorija srpske diplomatije: dokumenti: Srpsko poslanstvo u Londonu 1882-1902 (English: History of Serbian diplomacy: documents: Serbian Embassy in London 1882-1902), Volume 1 to 3 (2018/21) co-author
- Istorija srpske diplomatije: dokumenti: Srpsko poslanstvo u Parizu 1881-1902 (English: History of Serbian diplomacy: documents: Serbian Embassy in Paris 1881-1902) (2018/21) co-author
- Mitovi srpske istorije (English: Myths of Serbian History) (2019)
- Zablude srpske istorije (English: Errors of Serbian History) (2020)
- Legende svetske istorije (English: Legends of World History) (2020)
- Sećanja iz pepela : Narodna biblioteka Srbije 1941-2021 (English: Memories from the ashes: National Library of Serbia 1941-2021) (2021)
