= Police of Serbia =

Police of the Republic of Serbia Полиција Републике Србије
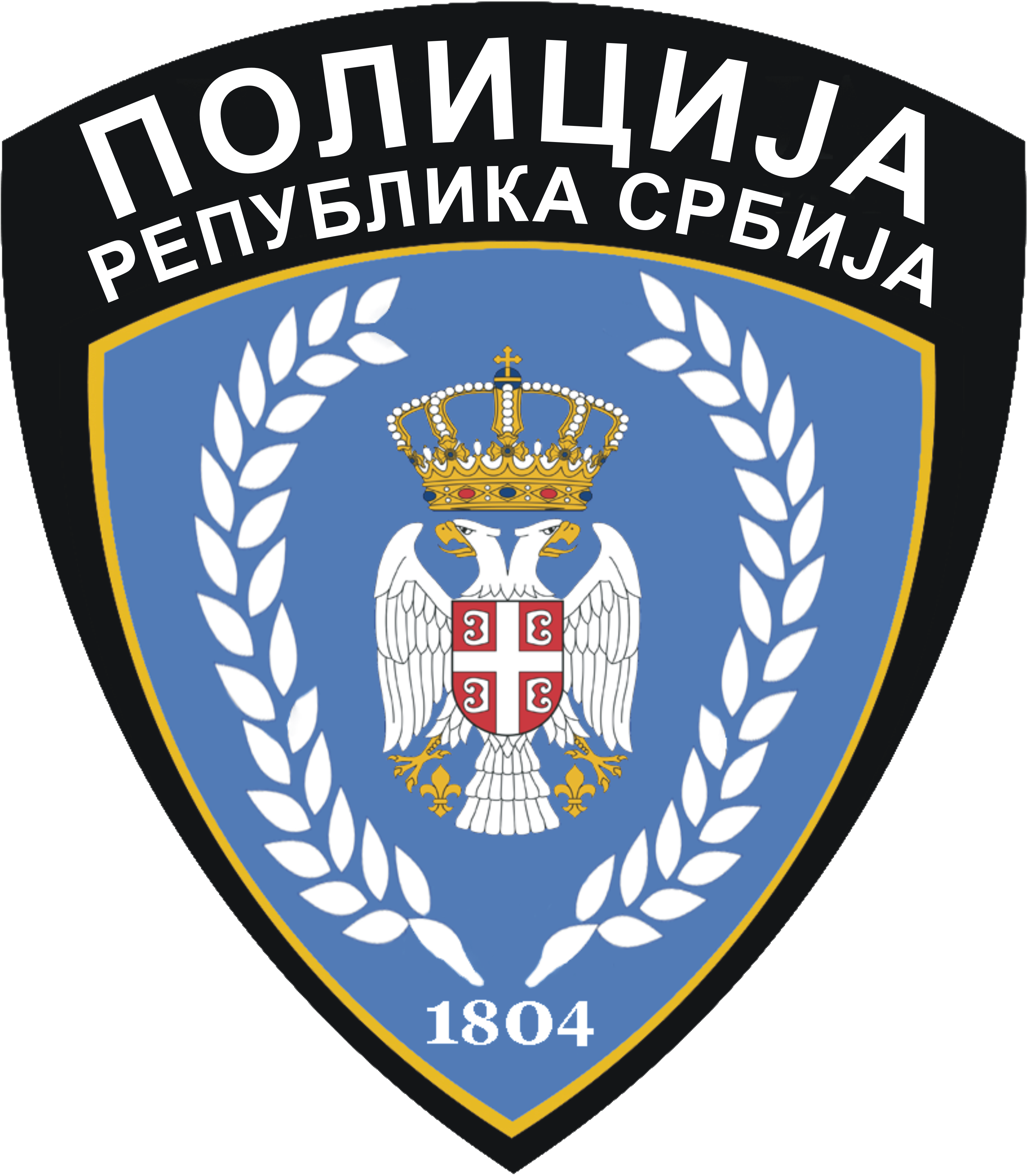
- Emblem of the Serbian Police

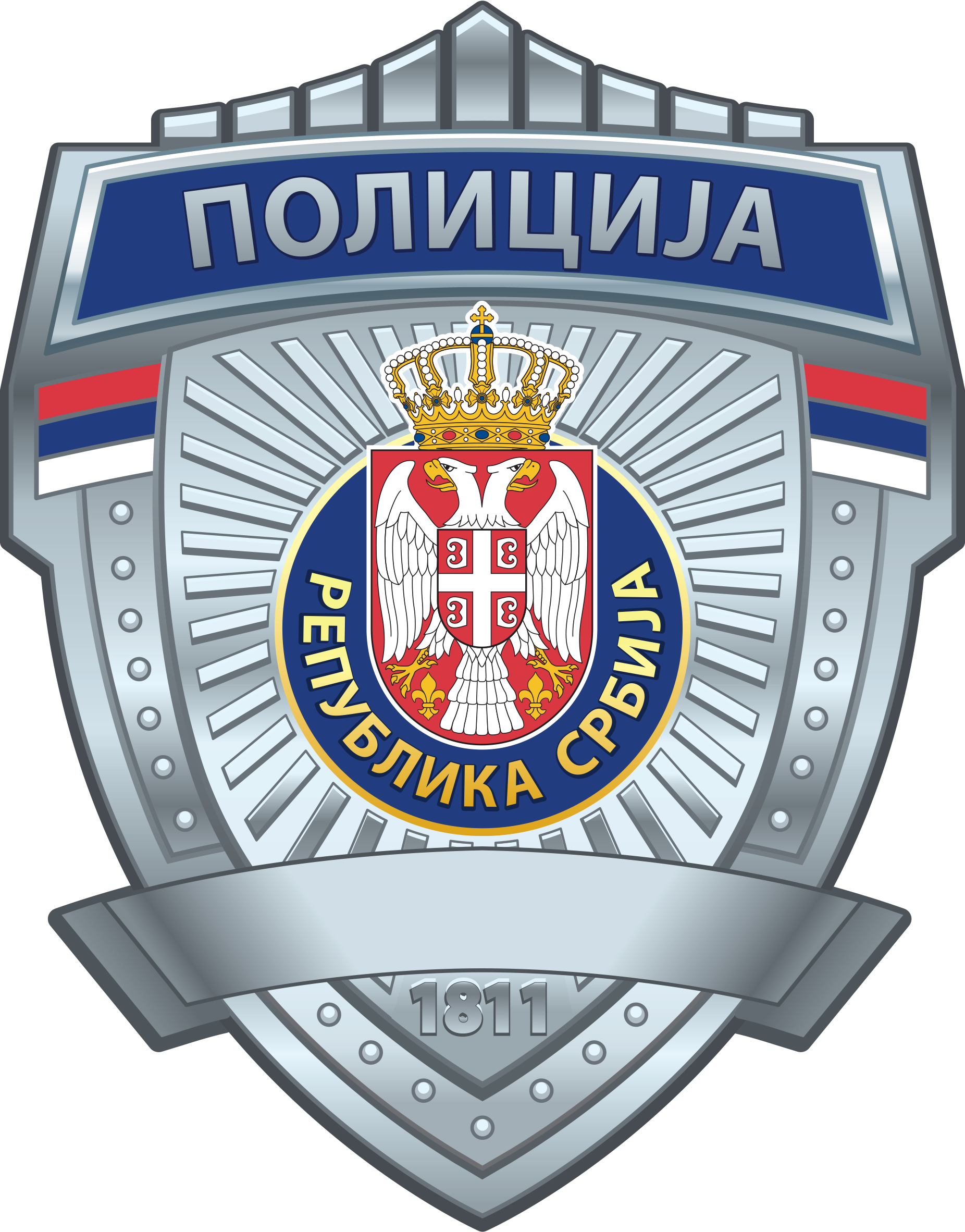
- Badge of the Serbian Police

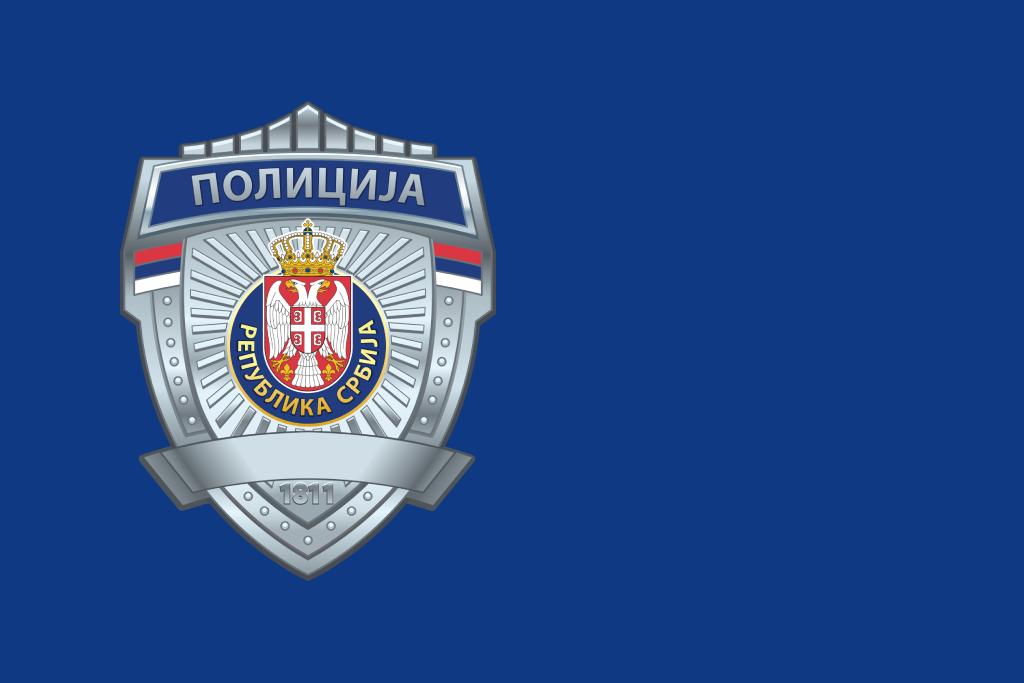
- Flag of the Serbian Police

Agency overview
- Formed: 1807 (current form since 1992)
- Preceding agency: Milicija (1956–1992)
- Employees: 27,363 (uniformed)
- Annual budget: 115.5 billion RSD (€983 million) (2024)

Jurisdictional structure
- Operations jurisdiction: Serbia
- Area: 77,474 km^{2}
- Population: 6.6 million
- Governing body: Ministry of Internal Affairs
- General nature: Civilian police

Operational structure
- Overseen by: Police Directorate
- Headquarters: Belgrade
- Agency executive: Dragan Vasiljević, Police Director
- Regional Police Directorates: 27

The Serbian Police (Serbian: Српска полиција, romanized: Srpska policija), formally the Police of the Republic of Serbia (Serbian: Полиција Републике Србије, romanized: Policija Republike Srbije), is the national civilian police force of Serbia. The Serbian Police are responsible for all local and national law enforcement. It is under the jurisdiction of the Ministry of Internal Affairs.

== History ==
=== Serbian Revolution ===
The roots of public security in revolutionary Serbia appear during the Serbian Revolution. At the 1807 Revolutionary Assembly police authority in nahijas (districts) was entrusted to voivodes and obor knezovi, and in local communities to the local knezovi. The executive officers of the obor knezovi were represented by golaći or bećari. Later, the role of executive bodies of the newly established courts was taken over by pandurs.

The organization of police authorities in Belgrade and other places was established on 30 December 1807 with regular and permanent police force stationed in Belgrade, which consisted of: police master (manager of the city police), police-neighborhood-masters (neighborhood managers), lictors (assistant of police master in charge of different departments), scribes and uniformed pandurs. At the Revolutionary Assembly held in 1811, a new reform of state administration was carried out, and the Serbian Governing Council was divided into six ministries. Jakov Nenadović was appointed as the first Minister of Internal Affairs.

In 1815, Prince Miloš Obrenović made a decision on the organization of pandurs - state-wide police officers in charge of public order and security of customs roads. The restored Serbian Soviet also received the function of the supreme police body (with a department for internal and judicial affairs) in 1825. In 1827, the jurisdiction of the Soviet was transferred to the Great People's Court, which in the following year established the function of town policemen and in Belgrade, a special police force, with three policemen. Soon, the function of buljukbaša (superintendent over 22 city police officers) was introduced into the structure of the municipal police of Belgrade.

=== Principality of Serbia ===
The 1835 Sretenje Constitution stipulated for the Ministry of the Internal Affairs and the Ministry of Military Affairs to be established. Due to the protests of Turkey and Russia, Prince Miloš Obrenović united military and police affairs shortly after its adoption.

The 1838 Constitution officially established the Ministry of Internal Affairs and confirmed that the minister also assumed the prerogatives of the Minister of War. In 1860 the first unified uniformed and armed gendarmerie company of 120 infantrymen and 15 cavalrymen was formed in Belgrade. From 15 to 17 June 1862, the Serbian Gendarmerie played a crucial role in the conflicts around the Čukur Fountain in Belgrade - a little more than 100 gendarmes opposed a Turkish force several hundred times stronger and practically saved Belgrade and Serbia. As the first conflict took place on All Souls' Day, June 15, this day is nowadays celebrated as the Day of the Serbian Police. Since the Gendarmerie was only responsible for public order and peace in Belgrade, uniformly uniformed and armed Municipal night watches were established in all other towns across the country.

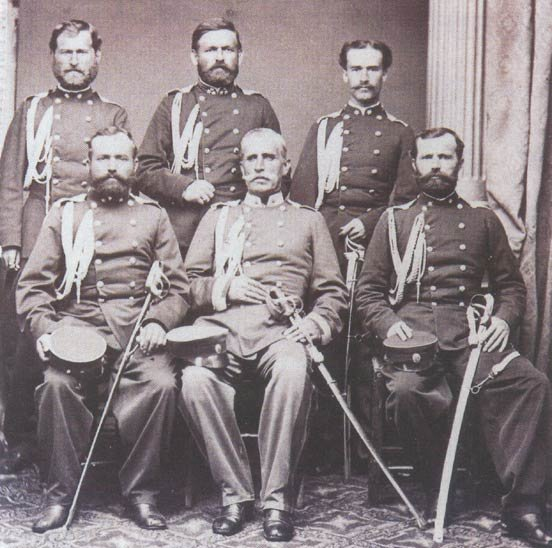
Gendarmery officers, 1865

=== Kingdom of Serbia ===
The 1884 Law on the Gendarmerie established the State Gendarmerie which was organized into detachments with one detachment in Belgrade and every district town. In 1896, the Border Guard was replaced by the Border Gendarmerie, which consisted of cordon commands distributed in five border sections, latter to be abolished in just three years with its responsibilities taken over by the newly-formed Border Troops. The Municipal night watchmen received the same uniforms as the Gendarmerie in 1903, and two years later, in 1905, they became an integral part of the Gendarmerie.

=== Kingdom of Yugoslavia ===
The Ministry of Internal Affairs was established in 1918 as the supreme administrative and supervisory authority over all administrative and police bodies in the newly-formed Kingdom of Serbs, Croats and Slovenes (later renamed Kingdom of Yugoslavia). In 1919, the Gendarmerie became an integral part of the Royal Army, tasked for watching over public order and security, maintaining order and peace and ensuring the execution of the laws. The Gendarmerie was subordinated to the Minister of Military Affairs in terms of supply, discipline and military training, and in terms of use, training, maintenance of public security and gendarmerie service - to the Ministry of the Internal Affairs. For the purpose of training Gendarmerie personnel, the Gendarmerie NCOs School was formed in Sremska Kamenica in 1919. The first police school, organized by Dr. Archibald Rice, was opened in Belgrade in 1921 and two years later Central School for Police officers was established in Zemun. In 1930 the regional police directorates were established in the seats of banovinas. The regular police duties were performed by corps of uniformed police force classified into: police guards, police agents, supervisors of guards and agents, commanders of guards, and chiefs of agents.

=== Socialist Yugoslavia ===
According to the 1946 Yugoslav Constitution, the Federal Ministry of the Interior was composed of the People's Militia Directorate, the Public Security Directorate and the State Security Service. The military structure, uniform form and military ranks were approved. The constitutional reforms of 1953 meant the formal renaming of ministries to the secretariats, and so the Federal Secretariat of the Internal Affairs and the republic-level secretariats of the internal affairs appeared. In the course of the demilitarization of the federal secretariat, the system of insignia in the People Militia was changed, the officers were allowed to wear civilian clothes outside the service, and service numbers were depicted on a nickel-plated badge.

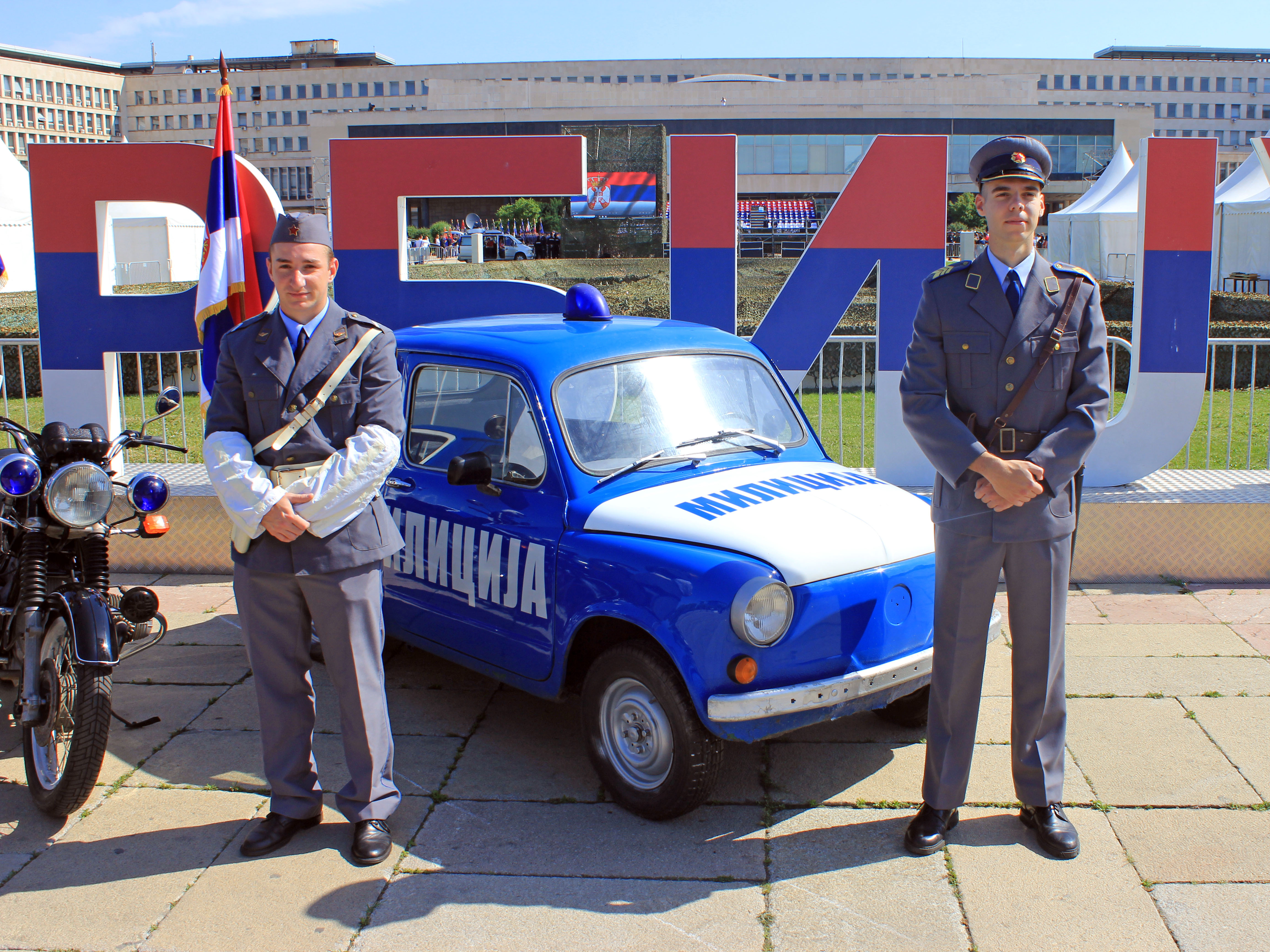
The Militia uniforms of the 1970s and 1980s along with Zastava 750 standard patrol car at the time

In 1956, the first Law on the Organs of Internal Affairs was adopted in the framework of decentralization and a bulk of internal affairs was placed at the disposal of constituent republics. The 1963 Yugoslav Constitution and the 1964 Basic Law on the Service for Internal Affairs continued the process of decentralization, forming the basic bodies of internal affairs at the municipal level. The name People's Militia (Narodna milicija) was changed to Militia (Milicija). At the federal level there was the Federal Secretariat of Internal Affairs. At the constituent republic's levels there were, respectively, republican secretariats of internal affairs. In essence, relations between the federal and republican police forces were based on the principles of agreements, assistance and cooperation in work, and not on hierarchical principles with subordination. Differences in funding and decentralization led to large differences in the organization of the Militia and the bodies of the Federal Secretariat of Internal Affairs.

The Militia, in charge of fighting crime, traffic security and the protection of borders was stripped of its military status, and European-styled police ranks were adopted for the republican militias during the 1970s and early 1980s.

=== Republic of Serbia ===
In 1991, the Ministry of Internal Affairs succeeded previous Secretariat of Internal Affairs of the Socialist Republic of Serbia. Militsiya was reorganized in 1992 in then-constituted Republic of Serbia and was subordinated to the newly-established Public Security Directorate (Resor javne bezbednosti - RJB). In 1996, the Militsiya was renamed to Police (Policija).

During the Kosovo war, police units, especially special police units, committed numerous crimes. According to reports, special police forces were responsible for Gornje Obrinje massacre, Krusha massacres, Suva Reka massacre, Izbica massacre, Dubrava Prison massacre, and many other crimes. After the war, police general Sreten Lukić was sentenced by the International Criminal Tribunal for the former Yugoslavia to 22 years in prison for deportations, forced relocations, murders, persecutions and other inhumane acts works. Also, some direct perpetrators of war crimes were convicted before the Serbian courts.

== Organization ==
The Serbian Police is a centralized police force, organised under the operational authority of the Police Directorate which devolves immediate conducting of police affairs to regional police directorates.

=== National level ===
The Police Directorate (Direkcija Policije), headed by the Police Director (Direktor Policije), has operational authority over police affairs in the country. It is subdivided into general directorates and specialized units.

General directorates of the Police Directorate are:

- General Police Directorate (Uprava policije) - in charge of general law enforcement operations and public security.
- Traffic Police Directorate (Uprava saobraćajne policije) - responsible for traffic law enforcement and management of traffic on public roads and streets.
- Criminal Police Directorate (Uprava kriminalističke policije) - in charge of investigation and prevention of crimes and felonies.
- Border Police Directorate (Uprava granične policije) - tasked with protection and control of borders, including fight against the migrant smuggling and human trafficking.
- Directorate for Administrative Affairs (Uprava za upravne poslove) - responsible for police administrative services to the general public, including issuing of national identity cards, driver's licences, passports, residential and working permits (for foreign citizens), registration of motor vehicles and issuing registration plates.
- Directorate for Analytics (Uprava za analitiku) - in charge of analysing and syntesing collected intelligence data, particularly by monitoring groups and organisations likely to be linked to organized crime and drug trafficking.
- Technical Directorate (Uprava za tehniku) - tasked with forensics work in order to provide evidence during criminal investigation in particular, utilizing numerous practices such as the analysis of DNA, fingerprints, bloodstain patterns, firearms, ballistics, toxicology, as well as analysis of financial, banking, or other numerical data for use in financial crime investigation.

Specialized units of the Police Directorate include:

- Gendarmery (Žandarmerija) - tasked with restoring public order if it has been heavily disturbed; countering organized crime, terrorist and other violent groups; repressing prison riots; providing security to the security-sensitive foreign embassies in Serbia.
- Special Anti-Terrorist Unit (Specijalna antiteroristička jedinica) - tasked for handling situations that are beyond the capabilities of regular police units because of the level of violence (or risk of violence) involved.
- Helicopter Unit (Helikopterska jedinica) - responsible for providing air support to various general directorates and units: air monitoring of general public security (riot control) in cooperation with the General Police Directorate, air monitoring of road traffic in cooperation with the Traffic Police Directorate, air monitoring of borders in cooperation with the Border Police Directorate; air support (including parachuting) for Special Anti-Terrorist Unit and the Gendarmery; aerial firefighting, medical evacuation, search and rescue, and VIP transport (transport of the President of the Republic, Prime Minister and Minister of Internal Affairs).
- Unit for the Protection of the Important Persons and Residences (Jedinica za obezbeđenje određenih ličnosti i objekata) - tasked with ensuring the body protection and physical security of residences of Prime Minister, President of the National Assembly, Minister of Internal Affairs, Minister of Foreign Affairs, Minister of Justice, Supreme Public Prosecutor, Public Prosecutor for the Organized Crime, Police Director; as well as visiting foreign dignitaries.
- Witness Protection Unit (Jedinica za zaštitu) - tasked with providing personal protection to people at threat from the organized crime requiring witness protection, providing protected persons with new identities and homes if necessary.
- River Safety Unit (Jedinica za bezbednost na rekama) - assigned with maintaining public order on major rivers (Danube, Sava and Tisza), controlling compliance with river navigation rules as well as search and rescue operations at rivers.
- Environmental Crime and Protection Unit (Jedinica za suzbijanje ekološkog kriminala i zaštitu životne sredine) - in charge of fight against illegal activities involving the environment, wildlife, biodiversity and natural resources.
- Operations Center (Operativni centar) - tasked with receiving and processing informations about security events and distributing them to police units and police officers on the ground, as well as with real-time coordination and supervision of operational measures and actions.

=== Regional and local level ===
The Police Directorate devolves bulk of direct police affairs to the regional police directorate (policijska uprava), headed by the chief of the police directorate (načelnik policijske uprave), which corresponds to the administrative districts (with two exceptions being Raška and Zlatibor districts which have two regional police directorates each). There are 27 regional police directorates: City of Belgrade, Bor, Čačak, Jagodina, Kikinda, Kragujevac, Kraljevo, Kruševac, Leskovac, Niš, Novi Pazar, Novi Sad, Pančevo, Pirot, Požarevac, Prijepolje, Prokuplje, Smederevo, Sombor, Sremska Mitrovica, Subotica, Šabac, Užice, Valjevo, Vranje, Zaječar, and Zrenjanin. Police Directorate of the City of Belgrade is by far the largest regional police directorate, both in terms of personnel and equipment; it has two specialized units: Police Brigade (crowd and riot control unit) and Intervention Unit 92 (rapid response unit).

For immediate conducting of police affairs there is a police station (policijska stanica) headed by the commander of the station (komandir policijske stanice). There are 174 police stations across the country typically covering the territory of municipality (or, in case of cities, city municipality). They are in charge of community policing and traffic control as well as providing police administrative services to the public (issuing of identification cards, driving licences, passports, residential and working permits for foreign citizens; registration of motor vehicles and issuing registration plates). In some specific places (tourist places such as ski-resorts of Kopaonik and Zlatibor or spa-resort Palić) as well as dozens of other places (usually larger villages or distant suburbs) police substation (policijska ispostava) is established.

== Equipment ==
=== Uniforms ===
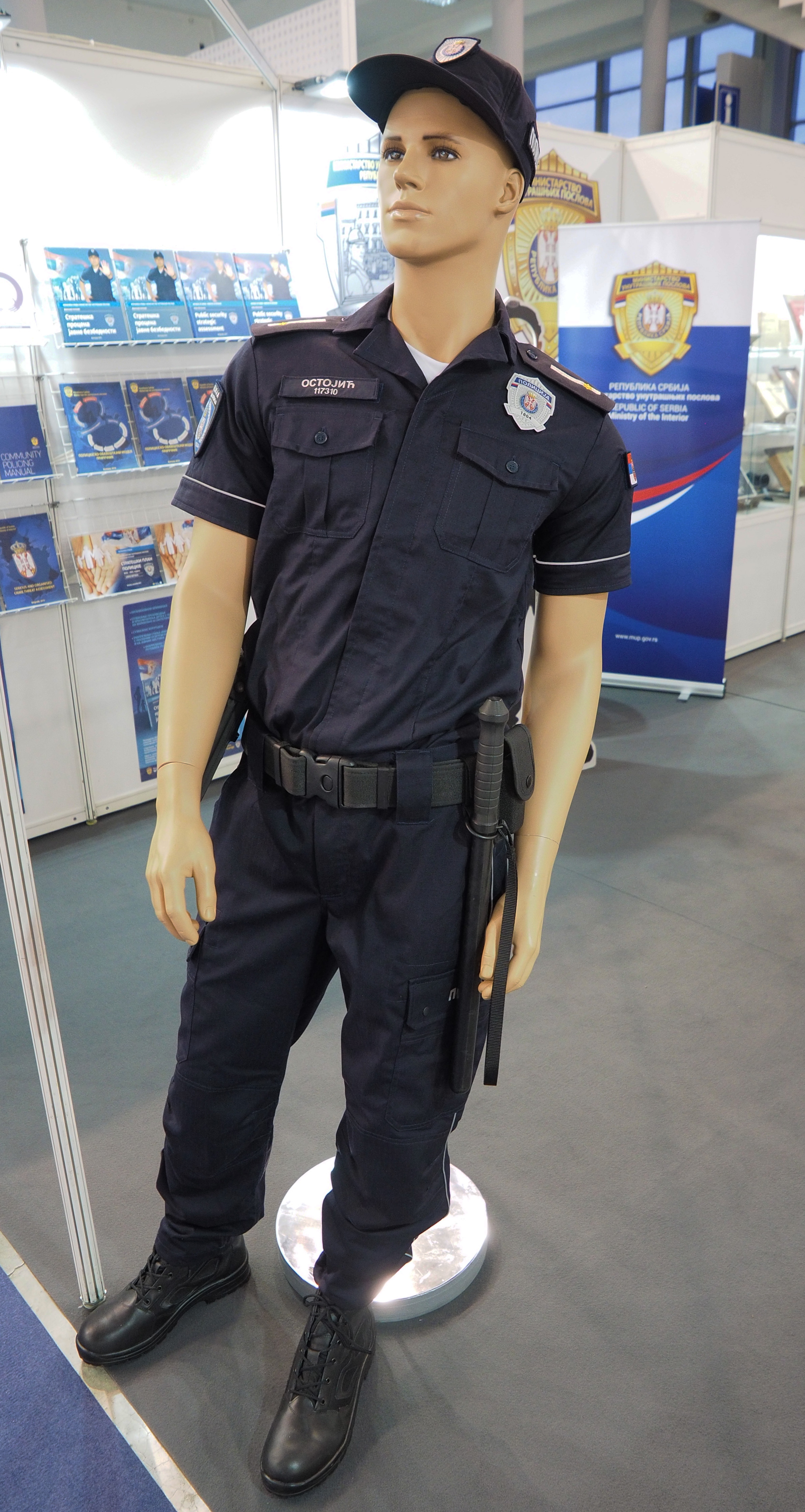
Service uniform

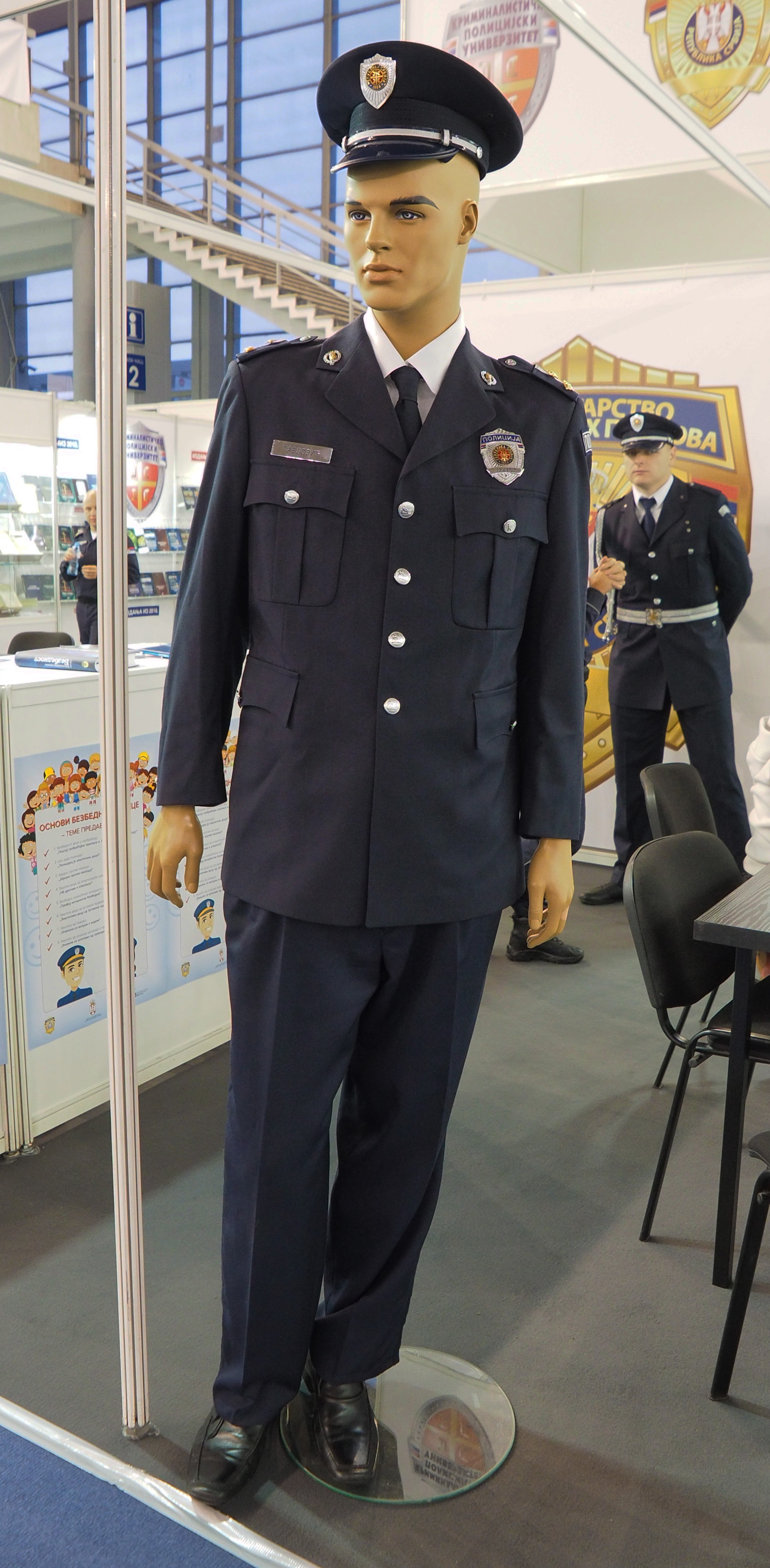
Formal dress uniform

The current service uniform was adopted in 2013, replacing the previous uniform which dated from 2002. The dark blue outfit includes trousers (in summer and winter version), long- and short-sleeved shirts, a short- and long-sleeved polo shirts, sweater, two jackets (for transitional weather periods and for winter), raincoat, gloves, pair of shoes (in summer and winter version). Shirts, jackets and raincoats are with the POLICE (ПОЛИЦИЈА in Serbian Cyrillic alphabet) marking on the back side, while on trousers there are small POLICE (ПОЛИЦИЈА) markings on the side pockets. On shirt, sweater and jacket cloth police badge is worn on left breast while the name tag (along with identification number) atop the right breast; cloth police patch (varying depending on the uniformed police branch: general police, traffic police or border police) are embroidered on right shoulder sleeve. Headgear include soft cap with the emblem of the police at the front and small POLICE (ПОЛИЦИЈА) marking on the sides, and fleece cap (with the emblem of the police at the front) for winter period. There are some distinctive features depending on the specific directorate: traffic police wear yellow reflective vest with TRAFFIC POLICE (САОБРАЋАЈНА ПОЛИЦИЈА) marking on the back and smaller one on the right breast; border police shirts and jackets are all marked with BORDER POLICE (ГРАНИЧНА ПОЛИЦИЈА) marking on the back.

Formal dress uniform, worn at ceremonial occasions, also presents dark blue outfit with straight-cut trousers (option of pencil skirt for women), coat, white shirt, dark blue tie, and pair of leather shoes. Metal police badge is worn on left breast while the metal name tag is atop the right breast; on shoulder sleeves there are police patch (on the right sleeve) and Serbian flag insignia (on the left sleeve). Headgear include peaked cap for men and peaked cap with rounded pattern for women.

Besides dress for regular uniformed police (general Police, Traffic Police, Border Police) there are also more specific outfits, including both service and formal dress uniforms, for specialized uniformed units such as Gendarmery, Special Anti-Terrorist Unit as well as ant-riot and rapid response units of the Belgrade Police Directorate (Police Brigade and Intervention Unit 92). One distinctive feature common for all these specialized units that are easily noted by general public is that their standard service headgear include berets and/or helmets in compare with soft caps of the regular police.

=== Personal equipment ===
Various items of equipment are usually carried on the duty belt of uniformed officers: baton, handcuffs, personal radio, police notebook, pens.

Anti-riot police units (Police Brigade of the Belgrade Police Directorate and Gendarmery's anti-riot companies) are provided with non-ballistic body armour and shileds, while tactical units (Special Anti-Terrorist Unit and Gendarmery's anti-terrorist companies) are equipped with ballistic body armour and shields.

=== Firearms ===
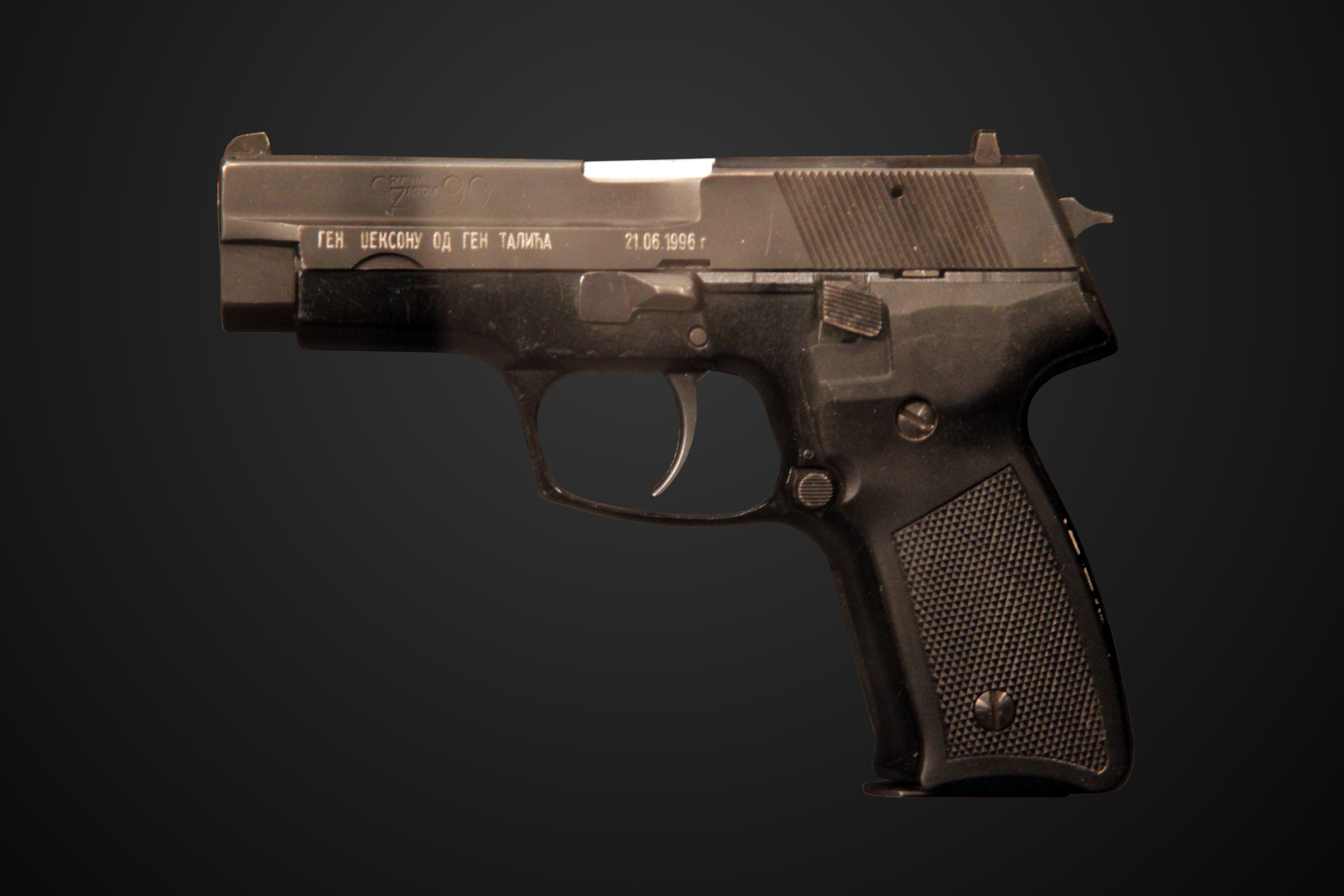
Zastava CZ99 standard service gun of the Serbian Police

All uniformed police is routinely armed with the firearms. The following firearms are used by the Serbian Police:

- Handgun:
  - Zastava CZ99 - standard service gun
  - Glock 17 - used by the Gendarmery and Special Anti-Terrorist Unit
- Shotgun:
  - Benelli M4 - used by the Special Anti-Terrorist Unit
- Carbine:
  - Colt M4 - used by the Gendarmery and Special Anti-Terrorist Unit
  - SG 552 Commando - used by the Special Anti-Terrorist Unit
- Submachine gun:
  - Heckler & Koch MP5 - used by the Gendarmery
- Light machine gun:
  - Zastava M84 - used by the Gendarmery
- Heavy machine gun:
  - Browning M2 - mounted on armored vehicles of the Gendarmery and Special Anti-Terrorist Unit
- Assault rifle:
  - Zastava M21 - used by the Gendarmery and Special Anti-Terrorist Unit
- Sniper rifle:
  - Barrett M95 - used by the Gendarmery
  - Sako TRG - used by the Special Anti-Terrorist Unit
- Anti-materiel rifle:
  - Zastava M93 Black Arrow - used by the Gendarmery
- Automatic grenade launcher:
  - Zastava M93 - used by the Gendarmery

=== Vehicles ===
==== Motor Vehicles ====
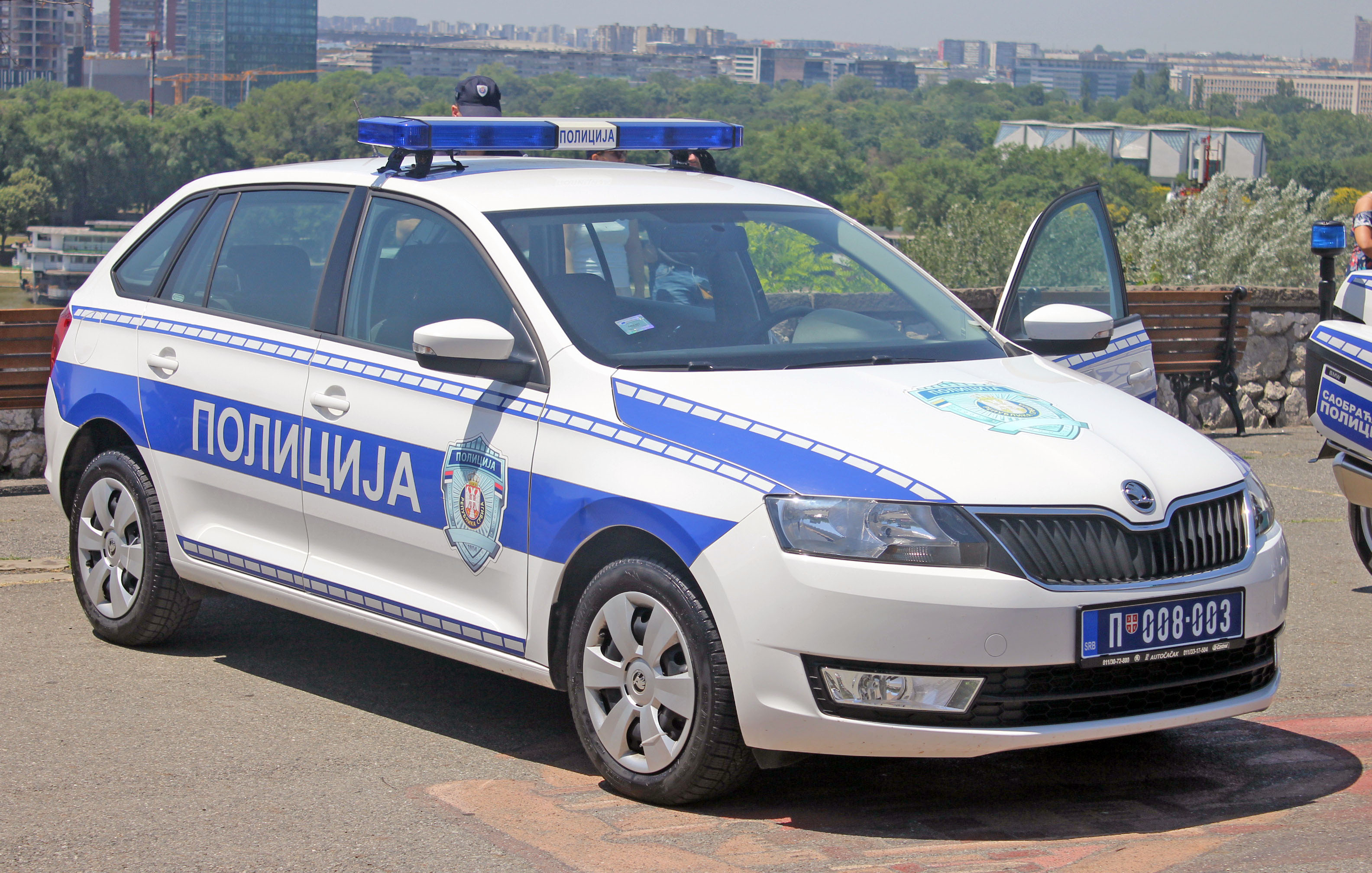
Škoda Rapid general patrol car

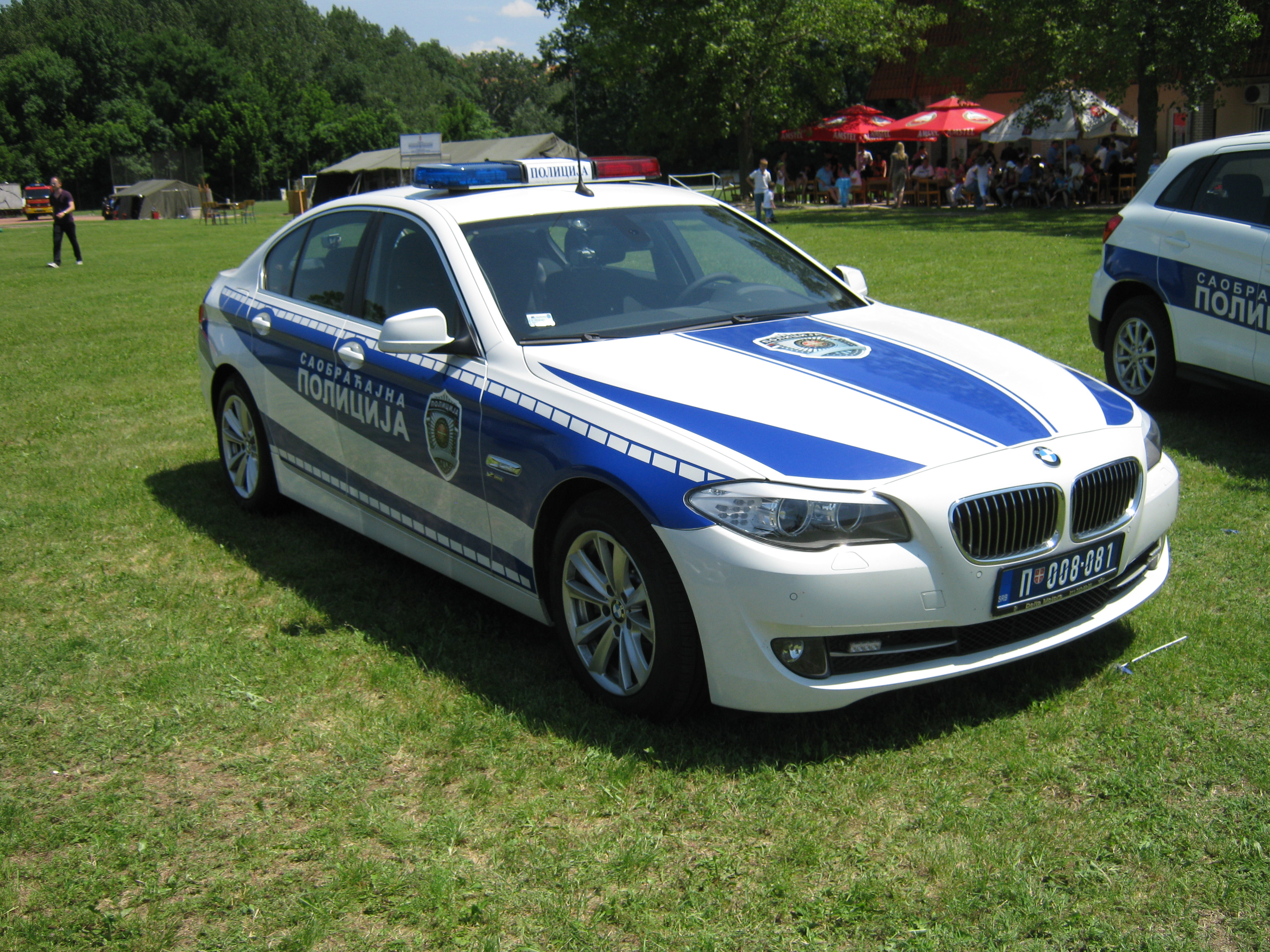
BMW F10 highway patrol car

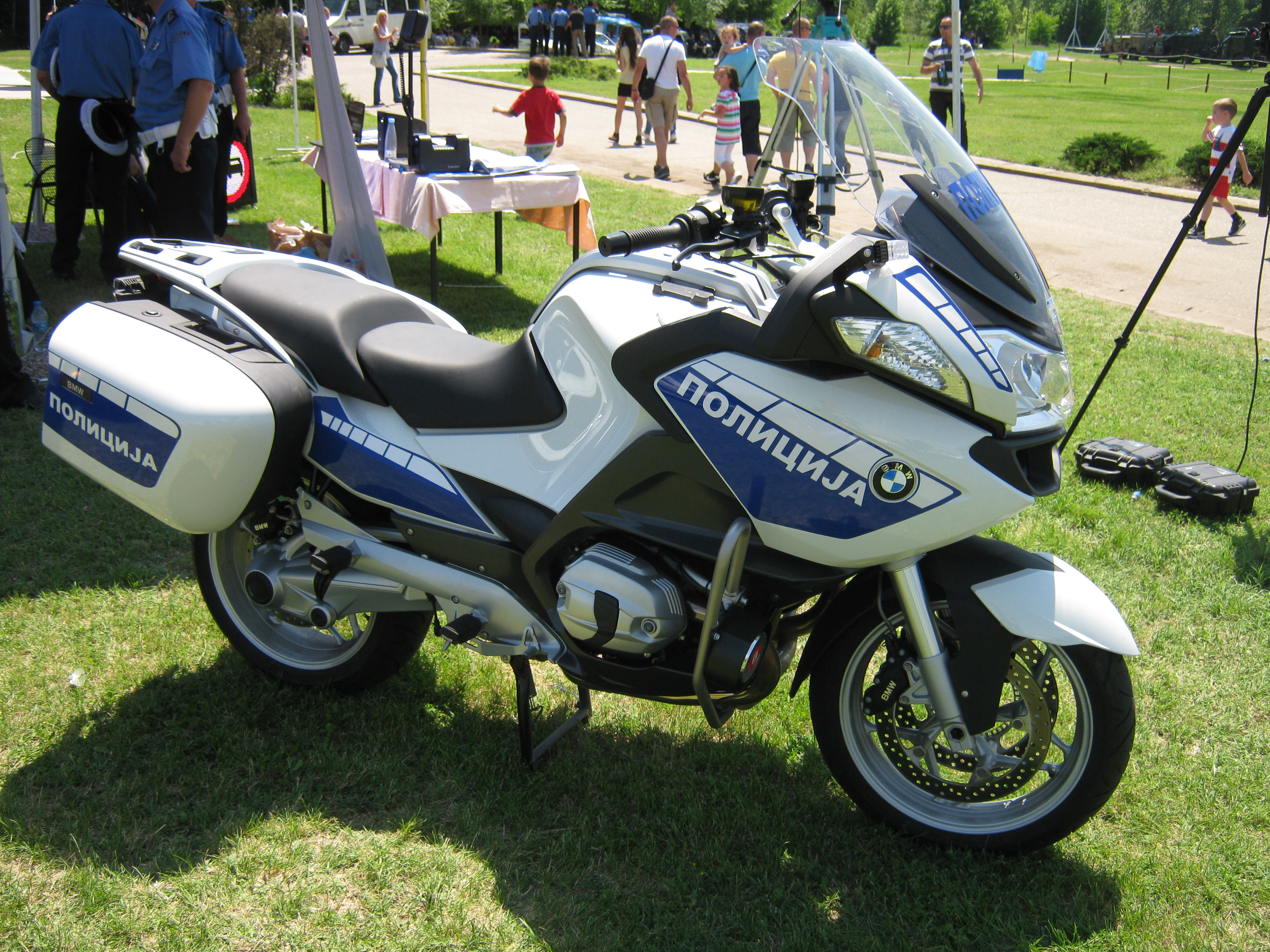
BMW R1200RT traffic/highway patrol motorcycle

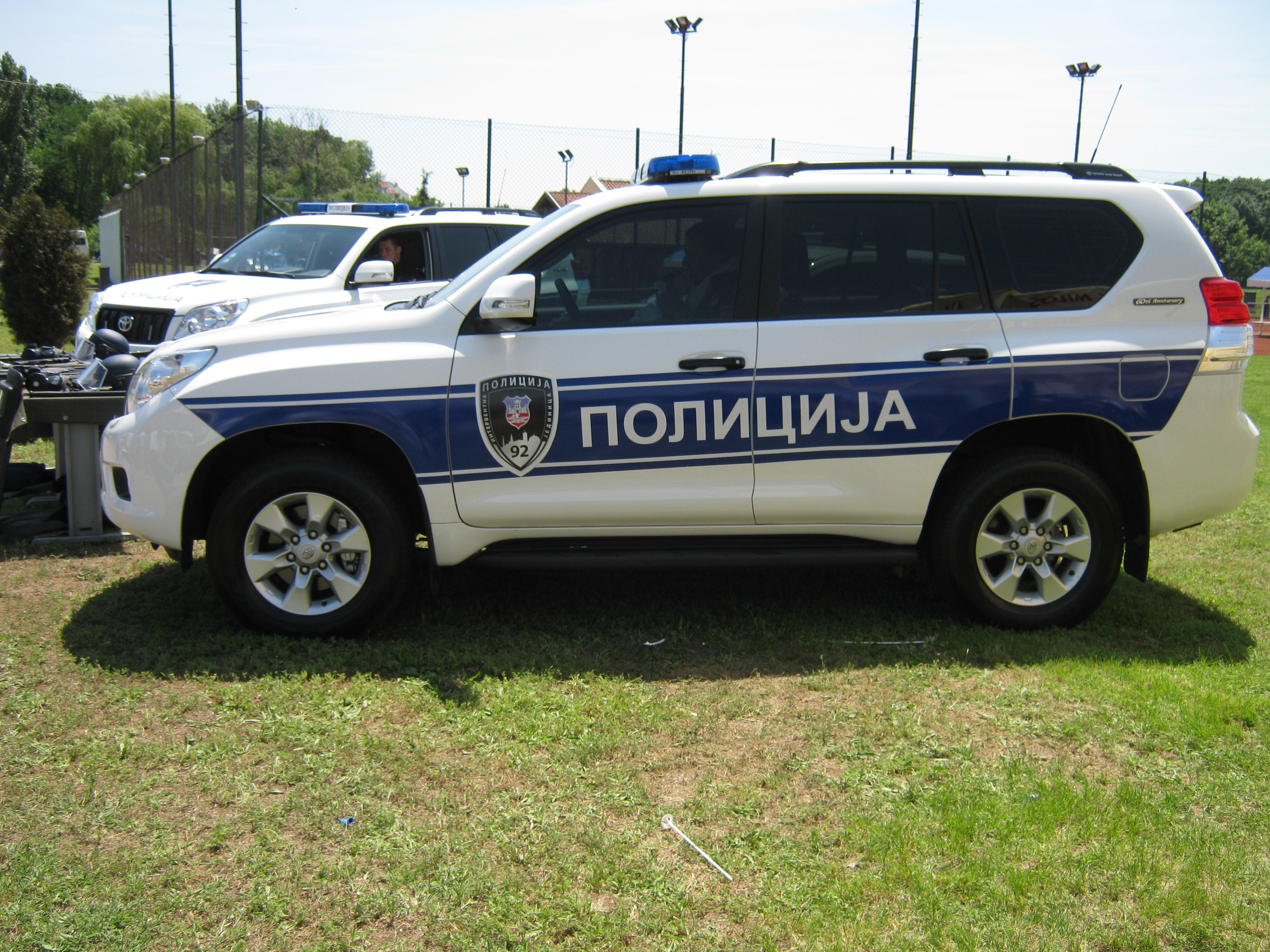
Toyota Land Cruiser rapid response/intervention car

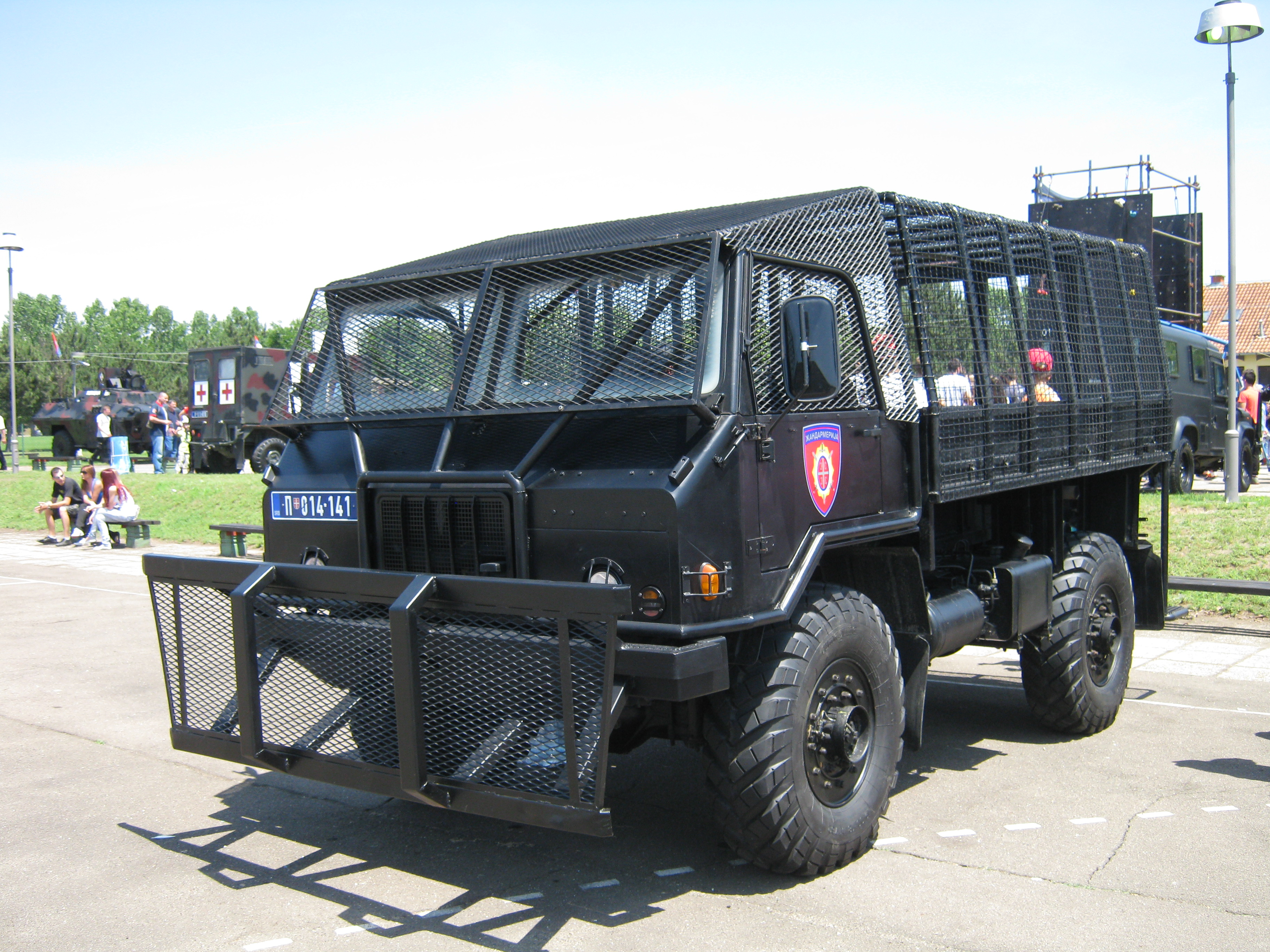
TAM 110 T7 B/BV anti-riot truck of the Gendarmery

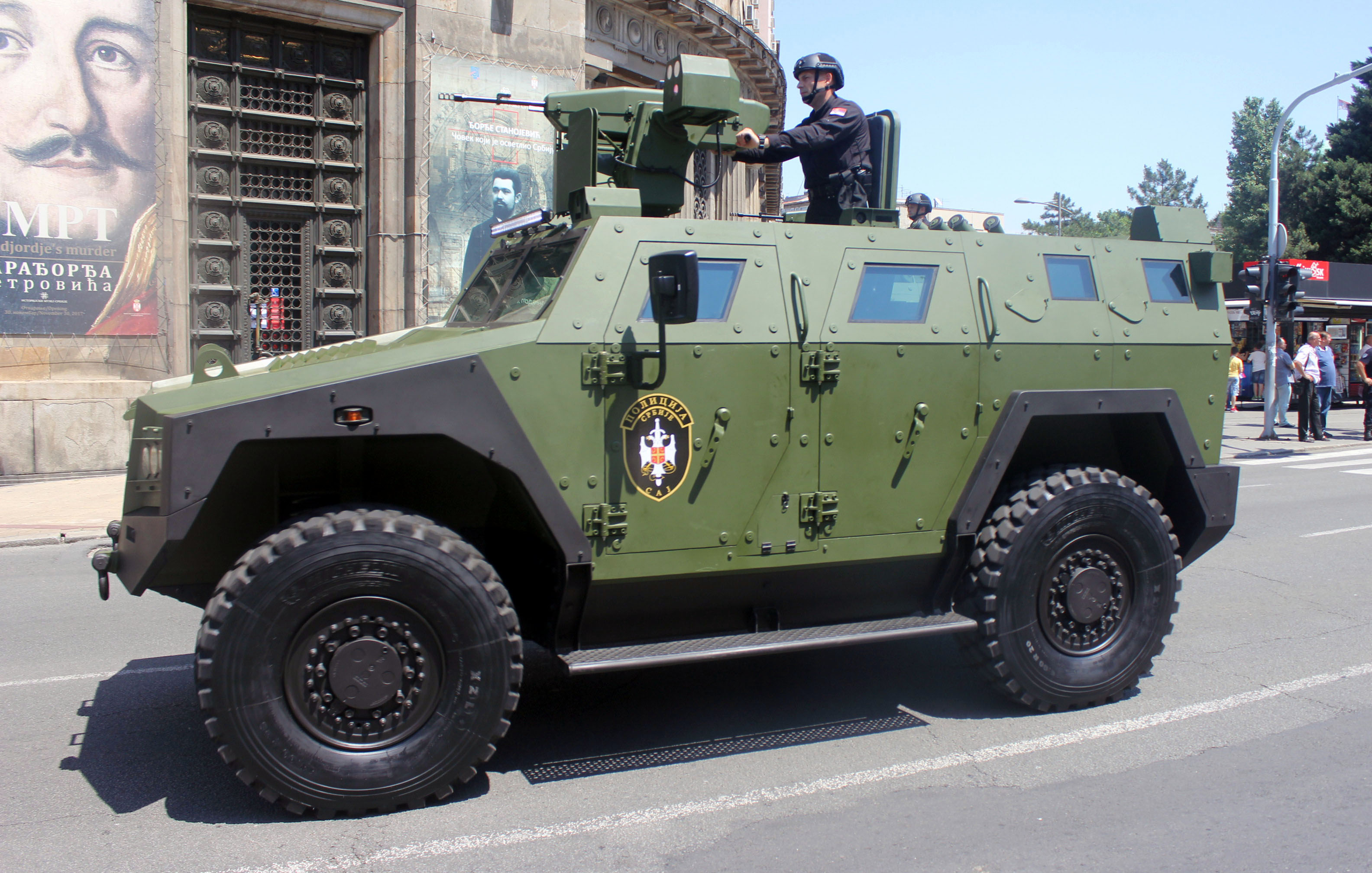
BOV M16 Miloš armored multipurpose vehicle of the Special Anti-Terrorist Unit

Today, most common types of motor vehicles include various models from Škoda and to much lesser degree from Volkswagen, Fiat, Toyota, Dacia, BMW, Audi, and Mercedes-Benz.

Patrol cars are painted in white color scheme with livery markings on the sides: consisted of wide blue stripes bordered on both sides with thinner stripes of rectangles, and with the POLICE (ПОЛИЦИЈА) marking and a small police emblem. On hood there is a large police emblem. The LED-based emergency lightbars are mounted atop the patrol cars.

Vans are painted in dark blue color scheme with the POLICE (ПОЛИЦИЈА) marking and police emblem on the sides.

Escort cars (used by the Unit for the Protection of the Important Persons and Residences) are unmarked but are typically painted in black metallic color.

Non-uniformed branches (most notably Criminal Police Directorate) generally use unmarked cars.

- Patrol cars:
  - Škoda Octavia - general/traffic patrol
  - Škoda Rapid - general/traffic patrol
  - Škoda Scala - general/traffic patrol
  - Fiat 500L - general/traffic patrol
  - Mitsubishi ASX - general/traffic patrol
  - Škoda Superb - highway patrol
  - BMW F10 - highway patrol
  - Volkswagen Golf Mk6 - border patrol
- Offroad patrol cars:
  - Dacia Duster - border patrol
  - Škoda Yeti - border patrol
  - Toyota Land Cruiser - rapid response/intervention
  - Land Rover Defender - Gendarmery
  - Mercedes-Benz G-Class - Special Anti-Terrorist Unit
- Patrol motorcycles:
  - BMW R1200RT - traffic/highway patrol
- Offroad patrol quads:
  - Yamaha Kodiak 700 - Gendarmery
- Escort cars:
  - Audi A8 - Unit for the Protection of the Important Persons and Residences
  - Audi A6 - Unit for the Protection of the Important Persons and Residences
  - Škoda Superb - Unit for the Protection of the Important Persons and Residences
- Vans:
  - Fiat Ducato - Gendarmery
  - Peugeot Boxer - Police Brigade
- Riot-control trucks:
  - TAM 110 T7 B/BV (some with mounted water cannon) - Gendarmery

==== Armored Vehicles ====
Armored vehicles are used by the Gendarmery and the Special Anti-Terrorist Unit.

- Armored multipurpose vehicles:
  - BOV M16 Miloš - Gendarmery/Special Anti-Terrorist Unit
  - Humvee - Gendarmery
- Armored personnel carriers:
  - Lazar 3 - Gendarmery
  - BOV M11 - Gendarmery
  - BOV M15 - Gendarmery
  - BOV M86 - Gendarmery/Special Anti-Terrorist Unit

=== Aircraft ===
Aircraft (rotorcraft) are used exclusively by the Helicopter Unit which, with its fleet of 13 helicopters in the operational use, provides an aerial support for the Serbian Police as well as for the Directorate of Emergency Situations of the Ministry of the Internal Affairs.

Helicopters are typically painted in blue and white color scheme except for three helicopters (used as air support to the Gendarmery and Special-Anti-Terrorist Unit) that are painted in military camouflage pattern used by the helicopter fleet of the Serbian Air Force and two fire-fighting helicopters that are painted in red.

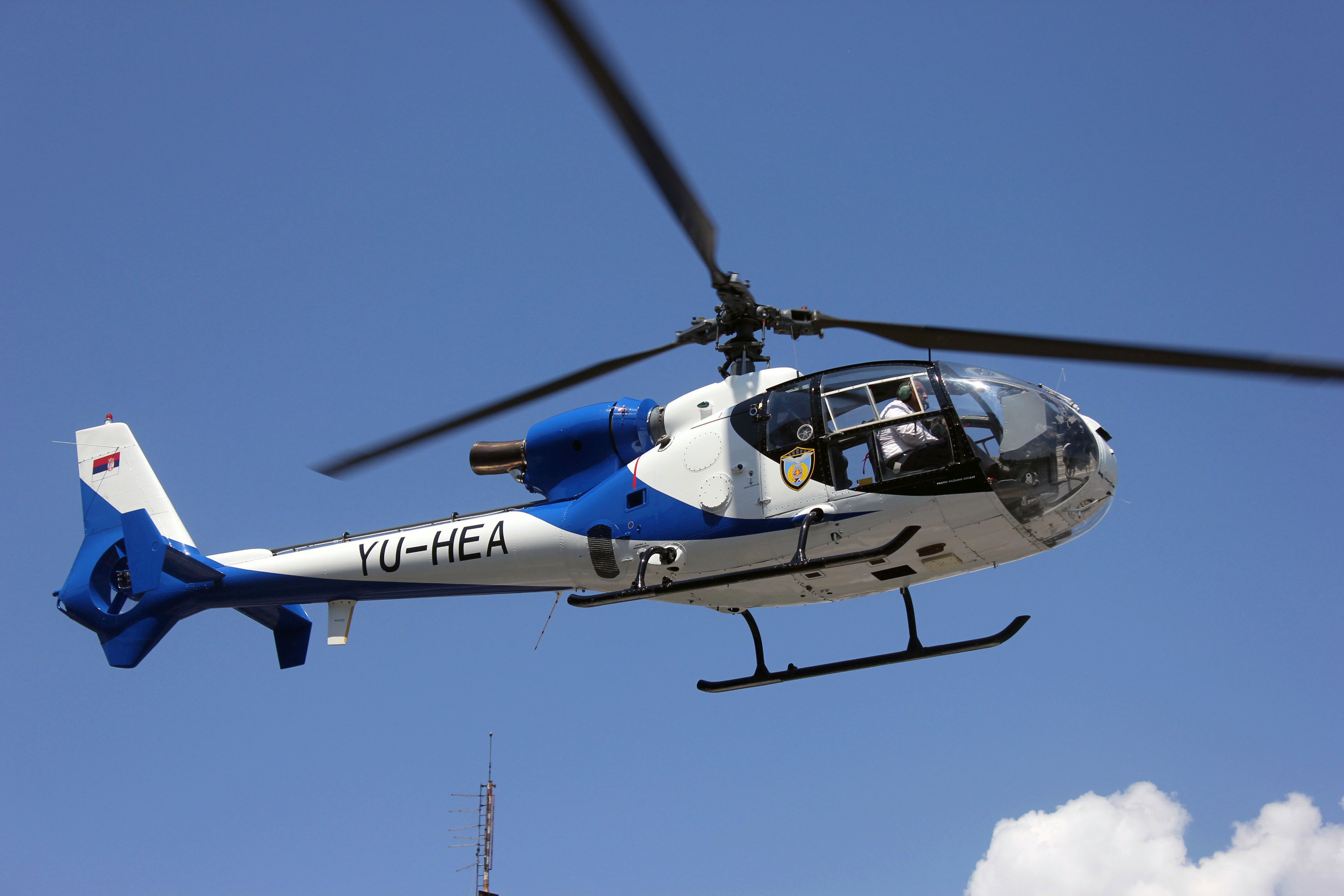
Aérospatiale Gazelle observation helicopter of the Helicopter Unit

- Observation:
  - Airbus H145M (1)
  - Aérospatiale Gazelle (3)
- Special operations (air support to the Gendarmery and Special Anti-Terrorist Unit):
  - Airbus H215 (2)
  - Airbus H145M (1)
- Aerial firefighting (air support to the Directorate of Emergency Situations of the Ministry of Internal Affairs):
  - Ka-32 (2)
- Medical evacuation:
  - Airbus H145 (1)
- Search and rescue:
  - Airbus H145M (1)
- VIP transport:
  - Airbus H215 (1)
  - Sikorsky S-76 (1)

=== Watercraft ===
Watercraft are used exclusively by the Gendarmery (i.e. its Diving Unit) and the River Safety Unit.

- Patrol cabin boats:
  - Vuk (7)
- Multirole fast combat boats:
  - Premax 39 (1)
- Rigid inflatable boats:
  - Zodiac 730

== Ranks ==
Генерал полиције	Пуковник полиције	Потпуковник полиције	Мајор полиције	Капетан полиције	Поручник полиције	Потпоручник полиције	Заставник полиције I класе	Заставник полиције	Водник полиције I класе	Водник полиције	Млађи водник полиције
General policije	Pukovnik policije	Potpukovnik policije	Major policije	Kapetan policije	Poručnik policije	Potporučnik policije	Zastavnik policije I klase	Zastavnik policije	Vodnik policije I klase	Vodnik policije	Mlađi vodnik policije

== Directors ==
The following is a list of heads of the Police of Serbia since 1992:

Name	Tenure
Public Security Directorate
Gen. Radovan Stojičić	1991–1997
Gen. Vlastimir Đorđević	1997–2001
Gen. Sreten Lukić	2001–2004
Gen. Miroslav Milošević	2004–2006
Police Directorate
Milorad Veljović	2006–2015
Vladimir Rebić	2015–2021
Dragan Vasiljević	2021–present

== Traditions ==
=== Day of the Police ===
Day of the Serbian Police is celebrated on 15 June, the anniversary of the Čukur Fountain Events. On that day in 1862, a little more than 100 gendarmes opposed a Turkish force several hundred times stronger and practically saved Belgrade and Serbia.

=== Patron saint ===
The patron saint (krsna slava) of the Serbian Police is All Souls Day.

== See also ==
- Crime in Serbia
- Municipal police in Serbia
- Ministry of Internal Affairs of Serbia
