= Čepure =

Coordinates: 43.8272°N 21.3567°E

- Village
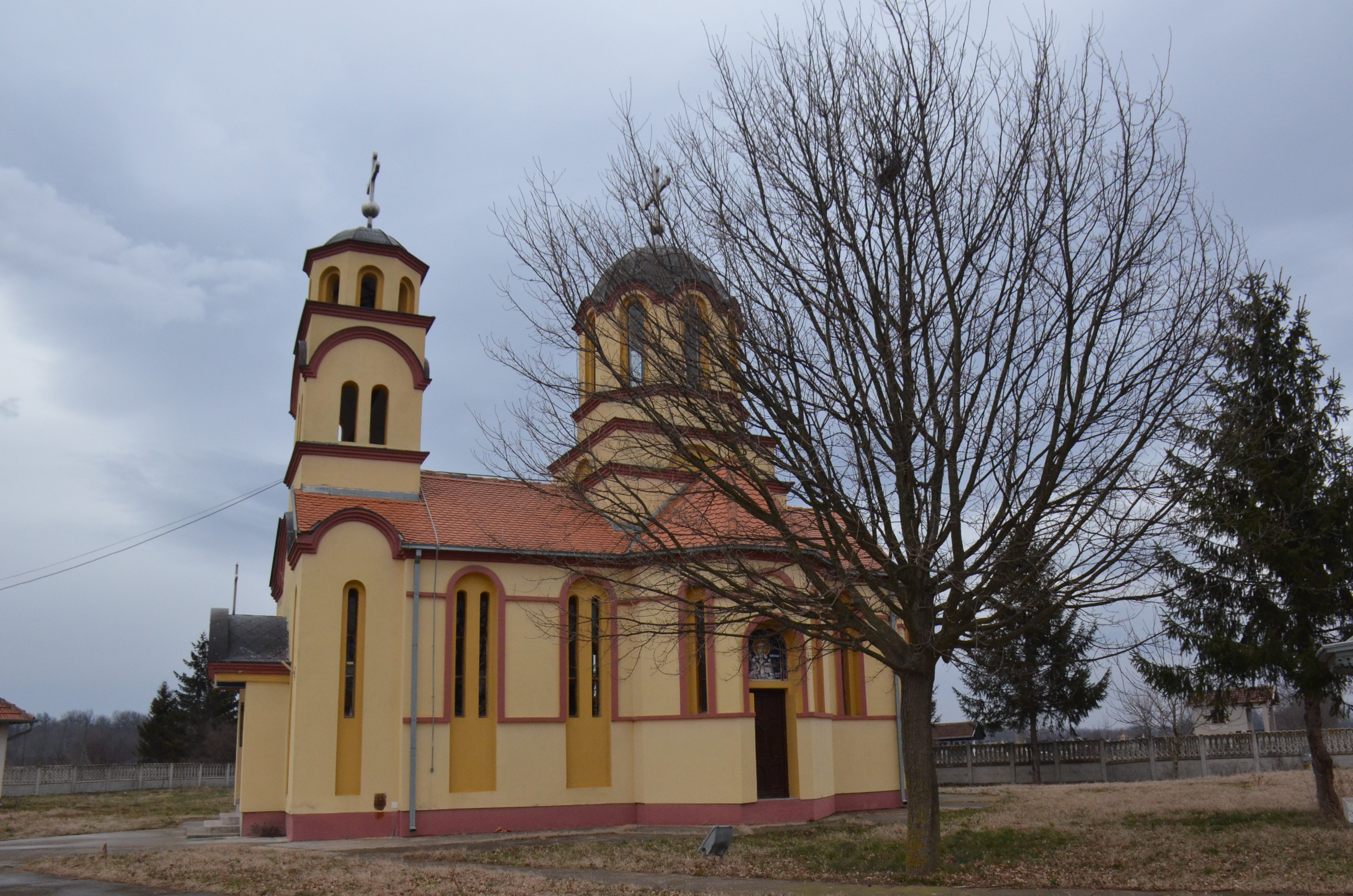
- Sacred Linden Tree in Čepure, municipality Paraćin, Serbia
- Interactive map of Čepure
- Country: Serbia
- District: Pomoravlje District
- Municipality: Paraćin

Population (2002)
  - Total: 825
- Time zone: UTC+1 (CET)
  - Summer (DST): UTC+2 (CEST)

Čepure is a village in the municipality of Paraćin, Serbia. According to the 2002 census, the village has a population of 825 people.

== Notable residents ==
- Predrag Marković (President of Serbia in 2004) was born in Čepure
