= Mihailo Jovanović =

Mihailo Jovanović may refer to:

- Mihailo Jovanović (footballer)
- Mihailo Jovanović (metropolitan)
- Mihailo Jovanović (politician)
