= Nebojša Bradić =

Serbian theatre director (born 1956)

- Небојша Брадић
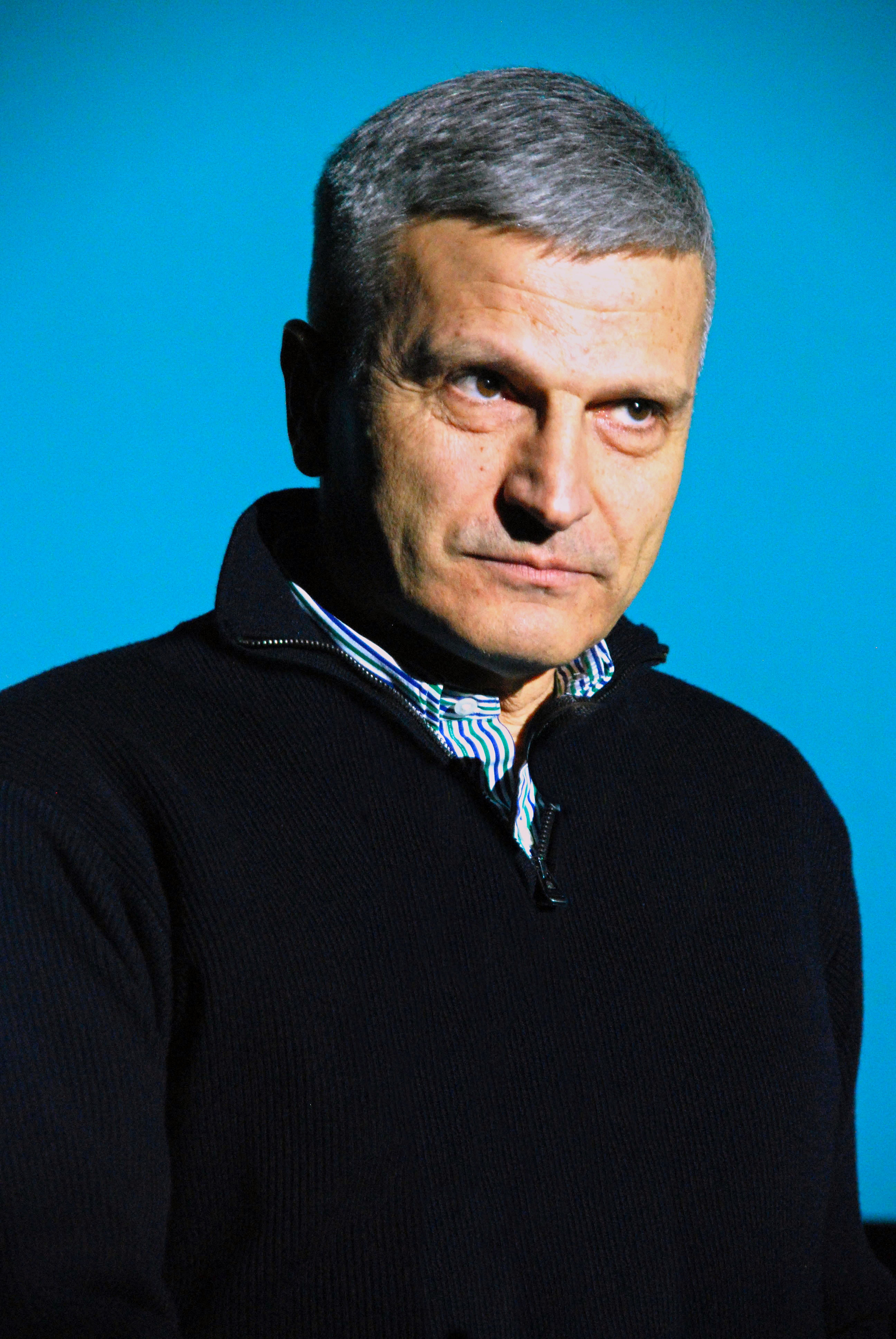

Minister of Culture
- In office 7 July 2008 – 14 March 2011
- Preceded by: Vojislav Brajović
- Succeeded by: Predrag Marković

Personal details
- Born: 3 August 1956 (age 69) Trstenik, PR Serbia, FPR Yugoslavia
- Party: G17+
- Occupation: Theatre director

Nebojša Bradić (Serbian Cyrillic: Небојша Брадић, born 1956) is a Serbian theater director. He served as the Minister of Culture in the Government of Serbia from 2008 to 2011.

== Biography ==
Bradić was born in Trstenik, Serbia. He graduated from the Faculty of Dramatic Arts in Belgrade with a degree in radio and theater.

From 1981 to 1996, he worked as the manager of the Kruševac Theater.

He was the head of Atelier 212 from 1996 to 1997, and then became the manager of the National Theater.

He was director and general director of Belgrade Drama Theatre from 2000 to 2008. Bradić taught acting at the Belgrade Academy of Fine Arts.

He was the Minister of Culture of Serbia from 2008 to 2011.

Bradić has been the editor-in-chief of the Arts and Culture Programme at the Radio Television of Serbia (2015–2019).

He has directed more than 70 plays in domestic, Bosnian and Greek theaters.

He is an author of many articles on theatre and culture politics.

== Awards ==
He is the recipient of important Serbian theatre awards. He was the first winner of the Nikola Peca Petrovic Award for the best Yugoslav theatre manager. He won nine awards as director at the Joakim Vujic Theatre Festival. He won nine award for the best directing at the first JoakimInterFest in Kragujevac 2006. He received the Sterija Award for best modern theatre adaptation, dramatisation and directing, Award of the Knjaževsko-srpski teatar, The Ring with figure of Joakim Vujić 2008.

Preceded by Vojislav Brajović	Minister of Culture of Serbia; 2008–2011	Succeeded by Predrag Marković
