= Municipal police (Serbia) =

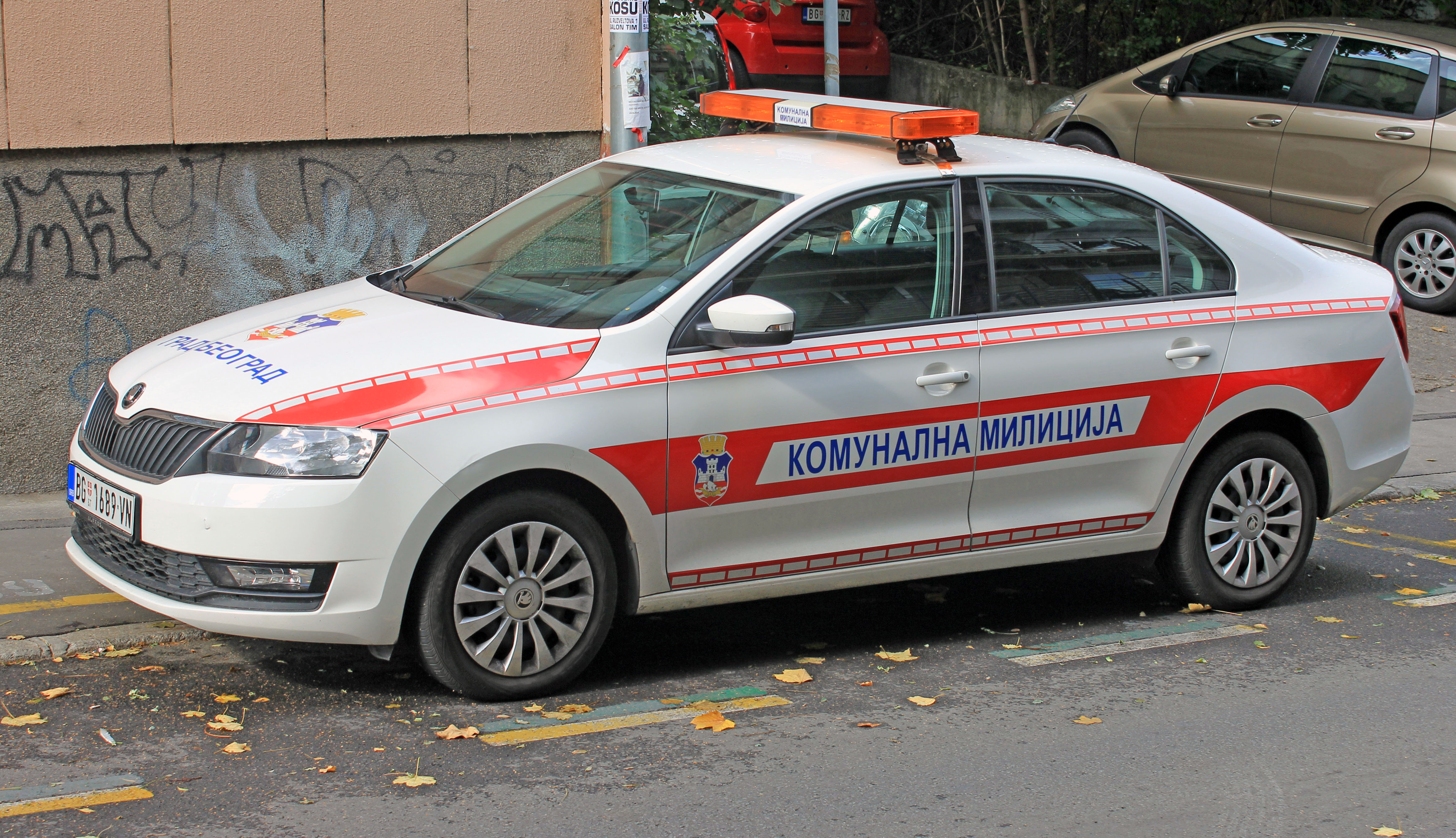
Škoda Rapid of the municipal police of the City of Belgrade

The Communal Police or Communal Militia (Serbian: Комунална милиција, romanized: Komunalna milicija, formerly Комунална полиција, Komunalna policija) is a local law-enforcement agency in Serbia under jurisdiction of a city, a type of municipal police. The municipal police are responsible for securing the implementation of tasks that are within the jurisdiction of the city or municipality.

== Missions ==
- Maintenance of municipal (and other legally regulated) order of importance for communal activities.
- Exercising control over the application of laws and other regulations and general acts of communal areas and other activities under the jurisdiction of the city.
- Exercising of supervision in urban, suburban and other local traffic, in accordance with law and regulations of the city.
- Protection of environmental, cultural goods, local roads, streets and other public facilities of importance for the city.
- Support implementing regulations that will ensure the smooth flow of life in the city, preservation of city resources and perform other tasks from jurisdiction of the city;
- Exercising control over the application of law about appearance of the symbols of the Republic of Serbia, excluding state, provincial and local authorities.

== See also ==
- Police of Serbia
