= Government Aviation Service (Serbia) =

Air transport of the President and the Prime Minister of Serbia

Government Aviation Service Авио-служба Владе
IATA	ICAO	Call sign
—	SRB	HEAD
- Founded: 1965 (current form since 2006)
- Fleet size: 3
- Headquarters: Belgrade Nikola Tesla Airport
- Website: aviosluzba.gov.rs

The Government Aviation Service (Serbian: Авио-служба Владе, romanized: Avio-služba Vlade) is a directorate of the Government of Serbia, which provides air transport for the President of the Republic, Prime Minister and other high-ranking state officials for visits outside the country.

== History ==
The history of the Government Aviation Service dates back to 1 June 1965 and the establishment of the Aviation Service of the Federal Authorities (Avio služba za potrebe saveznih organa) of the Socialist Federal Republic of Yugoslavia. Fleet initially consisted of two aircraft (Let L-200 D Morava and Beechcraft Baron B 55) as well as Bell helicopter with 5 pilots and an aircraft mechanic. In 1969, two Beechcraft Duke B 60 were acquired while in 1975 first two Learjet 25.

On 18 January 1977, the Prime Minister of Yugoslavia Džemal Bijedić, his wife Razija, and six others died when Learjet 25 crashed on the Inač mountain near Kreševo, Bosnia and Herzegovina. The plane took off from Batajnica Air Base near Belgrade and was en route to Sarajevo when it crashed, due to poor weather conditions.

In 1981, Dassault Falcon 50 was purchased while another Learjet 25 was purchased in 1985. In 1991, Learjet 30a (which is to date still in service) was acquired.

In 1995, the 675th Transport Squadron of the Yugoslav Air Force (tasked with transport of high-ranking officials as well), with a fleet of six planes and helicopters, was merged into the Aviation Service of the Federal Authorities.

Two Learjet 25 were sold in 1999 and another two in 2003, while Learjet 31A was acquired in 2004.

In 2006, after dissolution of the State Union of Serbia and Montenegro, Aviation Service of the Federal Authorities was transformed into the Government Aviation Service of the Republic of Serbia.

On 17 April 2015, Falcon 50 en route to Vatican with President of Serbia Tomislav Nikolić on board, returned back due to an engine failure and safely landed at the Belgrade Nikola Tesla Airport. Subsequently, the plane went on overhaul engine with extended life service for six years.

The Embraer Legacy 600 was acquired in 2018 while Dassault Falcon 6X was purchased in 2025 and these two planes nowadays form the backbone of the fleet.

== Fleet ==
=== Current fleet ===
Aircraft	Registration	Introduced
Dassault Falcon 6X	YU-RSB	2025
Embraer Legacy 600	YU-SRB	2018
Learjet 31A	YU-BRZ	1991

=== Retired fleet ===
Aircraft	Registration	Introduced	Retired
Dassault Falcon 50	YU-BNA	1981	2023
Learjet 25	YU-BJH	1975	1979 (crashed)
Learjet 25	YU-BJG	1975	2003 (sold)
Learjet 25	YU-BKR	1981	2003 (sold)
Learjet 25	YU-BRA	1984	1995 (sold)
Learjet 25	YU-BRB	1984	1995 (sold)
Beechcraft Duke B 60a	YU-BHL	1969	1978
Beechcraft Duke B 60a	YU-BGF	1969	1975
Beechcraft Baron B 55	YU-BBY	1965	1971
Let L-200 D Morava	YU-BBI	1965	1969

== See also ==
- Police helicopter unit
- List of air transports of heads of state and government
