= Police helicopter unit (Serbia) =

Helicopter unit
- Хеликоптерска јединица
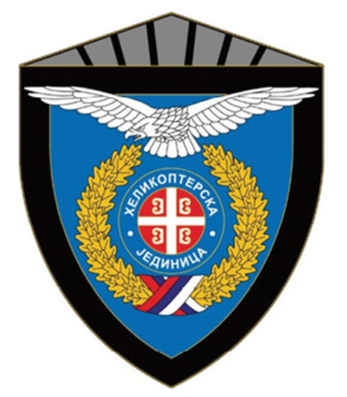
- Emblem of the Helicopter Unit
- Active: 1967
- Country: Serbia
- Agency: Police of Serbia
- Type: Police aviation unit
- Headquarters: Belgrade Nikola Tesla Airport
- Abbreviation: HJ

Equipment
- Aircraft: 13

The Helicopter unit (Serbian: Хеликоптерска јединица, romanized: Helikopterska jedinica) is the police aviation unit of the Police of Serbia.

== History ==
The Helicopter Unit was founded in 1967 when a Bell 47 J-2 was donated to the Republican Secretariat of Internal Affairs of the Socialist Republic of Serbia by the Federal Geological Institute of the Socialist Federal Republic of Yugoslavia who had used it for geological exploration for uranium.

From 1980 onwards, a number of new generation helicopters with jet engines entered service including the Bell AB-212, the Bell 206, Soko Gazelle and later the Aerospatiale AS365N Dauphin.

When riots broke out in Kosovo in 1989 and 1990, helicopters were used to break up the mass demonstrations by Albanians. The AB-212s were used to transport special forces units to rebel strongholds.

The Federal Secretariat of Internal Affairs established a helicopter squadron during the 1960s acquiring a number of helicopters. This squadron was dissolved in 1992 and integrated into the Republican Secretariat of Internal Affairs Helicopter Unit.

In 1992, the Ministry of Internal Affairs of the Republic of Serbia was established, consisting of the Public Security Directorate, which oversaw the Milicija (later renamed to Policija (police) in 1996) and the State Security Directorate.

Public Security Service i.e. police helicopter fleet included the Bell 206B/L, Soko Gazelle SA-341/342, Bell AB-212, Aerospatiale SA-365N Dauphin, Mi-17 and Mi-24. In 1998, a Sikorsky S-76 had entered service in the fleet for VIP transport.

The State Security Directorate had its own Aviation Unit with a fleet of helicopters within its Special Operations Unit. The Special Operations Unit took part in numerous combat operations during the Kosovo crisis. Mi-24s were used to attack rebel training camps and hundreds of transport and medevac flight were carried out. During the 1999 NATO bombing of Yugoslavia, Special Operations Unit's helicopters continued to fly liaison and medivac missions and no helicopters were damaged but the fleet hangar was destroyed.

In 2002, the Ministry of Internal Affairs was re-organised and consequently the Special Operations Unit's aviation personnel was integrated into the Helicopter Unit of the Police while its helicopter fleet (Mi-24 and Mi-17) was transferred to the Air Force.

The unit has recently undergone the process of massive modernisation of its fleet with the addition of 4 Airbus Helicopters H145M, 2 Airbus Helicopters H215, and 2 Kamov Ka-32.

== Missions ==
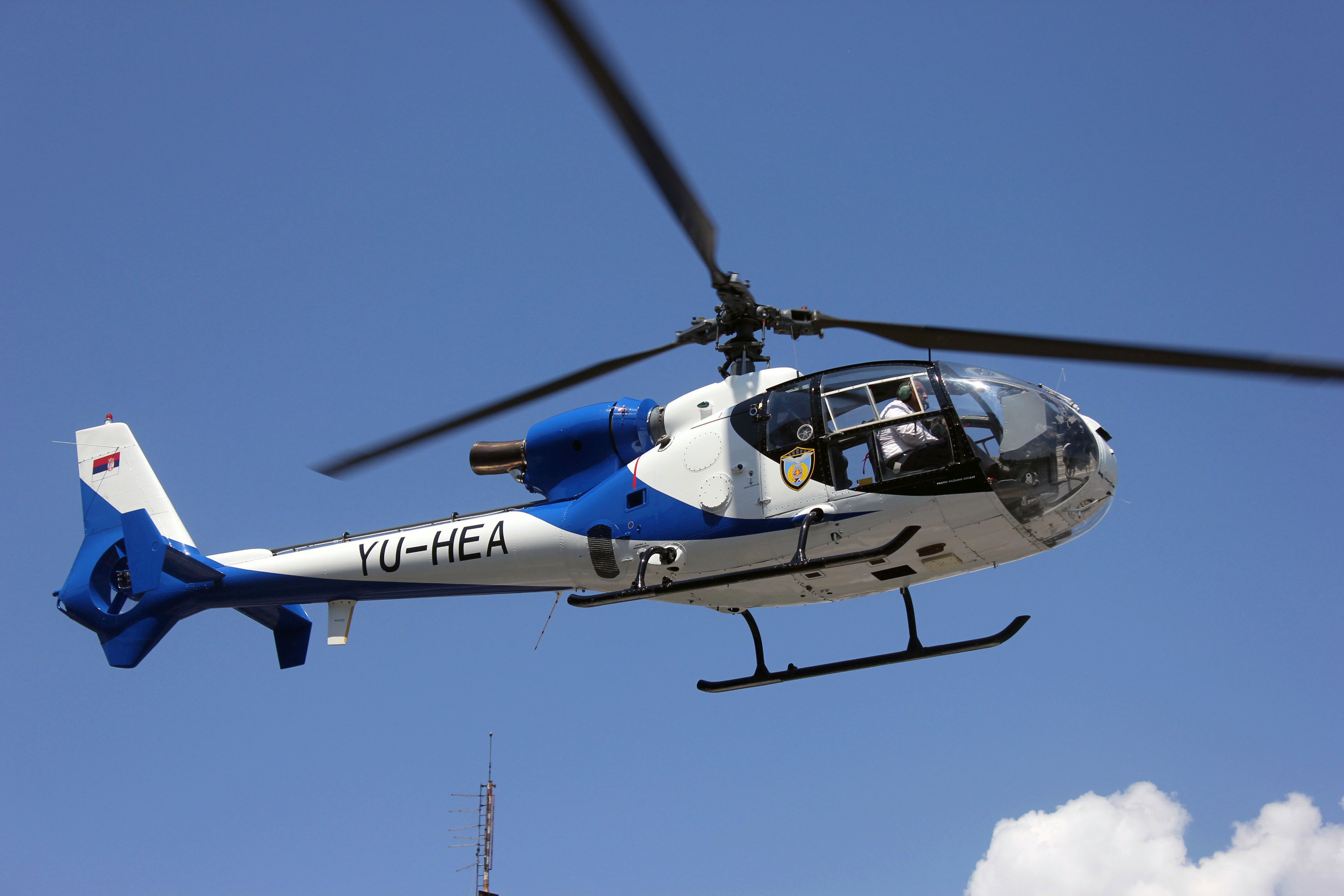
One of Aerospatiale Gazelle in use by the Helicopter Unit

The Helicopter Unit undertakes a wide variety of missions for the police as well as for the Ministry of Internal Affairs:

- Air monitoring of general public security (riot control) in cooperation with the General Police Directorate
- Air monitoring of road traffic in cooperation with the Traffic Police Directorate
- Air monitoring of borders in cooperation with the Border Police Directorate
- Air support (including parachuting) for the Special Anti–Terrorist Unit and the Gendarmery
- Aerial firefighting and search and rescue in cooperation with the Directorate of Emergency Situations of the Ministry of the Internal Affairs
- Medical evacuation
- VIP transport (transport of the President of the Republic, Prime Minister and Minister of Internal Affairs)

The Helicopter Unit has its own training course for its pilots and its own aviation technician support unit.

== Fleet ==
Helicopters are typically painted in blue and white color scheme except for three helicopters (used as air support to the Gendarmery and Special-Anti-Terrorist Unit) that are painted in military camouflage pattern used by the helicopter fleet of the Serbian Air Force and two fire-fighting helicopters that are painted in red.

=== Current ===
Aircraft	Origin	Versions	Quantity	Notes
Airbus Helicopters H145	Germany	H145; H145M	4	one used for observation, one for special operations, one for search and rescue, one for medical evacuation
Airbus Helicopters H215	France	H215	3	two used for special operations (air support to the Gendarmery and the Special Anti-Terrorist Unit), one for VIP transport
Soko Gazelle	France	SA 341G; SA 342L	3	used for air monitoring and observation
Sikorsky S-76	United States	S-76B	1	used for VIP transport
Kamov Ka-32	Russia	Ka-32A11BC	2	used for aerial firefighting

=== Retired ===
Aircraft	Origin	Versions	Quantity	Notes
Bell 212	Italy	AB 212	3	donated in 2026 to the Aviation Directorate of Republika Srpska
Bell 206	United States	206B	4	3 retired in 2024; 1 donated in 2026 to the Aviation Directorate of Republika Srpska
Agusta-Bell 206	Italy	206A; 206B	4	retired in 2010s
Aerospatiale AS365	France	SA 365N	2	sold in 2004
Mil Mi-17	Soviet Union	Mi-17	2	transferred in 2002 to the Air Force, used by the Special Operations Unit
Mil Mi-24	Soviet Union	Mi-24V	2	retired in 2002, used by the Special Operations Unit
Bell 47J Ranger	United States	Bell 47J-2A	1	retired in 1985, transferred to Nikola Tesla Technical Museum in Zagreb, Croatia

== See also ==
- Government Aviation Service
