= Vladan Vukosavljević (politician) =

Serbian politician

- Владан Вукосављевић
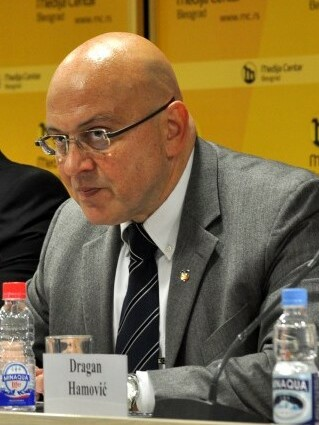

Minister of Culture and Information
- In office 11 August 2016 – 28 October 2020
- Prime Minister: Aleksandar Vučić; Ivica Dačić (Acting); Ana Brnabić
- Preceded by: Ivan Tasovac
- Succeeded by: Maja Gojković

Personal details
- Born: 2 April 1966 (age 60) Belgrade, SR Serbia, SFR Yugoslavia
- Party: Independent
- Education: University of Belgrade

Vladan Vukosavljević (Serbian Cyrillic: Владан Вукосављевић) is a Serbian politician and a former Minister of Culture and Information of the Republic of Serbia.

== Biography ==
He graduated from the Faculty of Law in Belgrade. He had several study stays in France and Germany, and attended a postgraduate specialist course at the Faculty of Law on the topic of International Trade.

Vukosavljevic worked in foreign trade in the Belgrade company Universal. He was the director and owner of a real estate and legal services company, and since 2002 the director and co-owner of the public relations company Logos public Relations.

In 2011, he was the initiator of the petition for the establishment of the Museum of the Victims of the Genocide of Serbs in the 20th century.

He was appointed Secretary of Culture of the City of Belgrade in 2013. He is a member of the Royal Cabinet of the Karađorđević dynasty.

Since 11 August 2016 he has been serving as a Minister of Culture and Information of the Republic of Serbia.

He speaks English and French.
