= Predrag Marković =

Serbian politician

- Предраг Марковић
- Marković in 2011

Minister of Culture, Media and Information Society
- In office 14 March 2011 – 27 July 2012
- Prime Minister: Mirko Cvetković
- Preceded by: Nebojša Bradić (Culture); Jasna Matić (Telecommunications and Information Society)
- Succeeded by: Bratislav Petković

President of Serbia
- Acting
- In office 4 March 2004 – 11 July 2004
- Prime Minister: Vojislav Koštunica
- Preceded by: Vojislav Mihailović (acting)
- Succeeded by: Boris Tadić

President of the National Assembly of Serbia
- In office 4 March 2004 – 14 February 2007
- Preceded by: Dragan Maršićanin
- Succeeded by: Tomislav Nikolić

Personal details
- Born: 7 December 1955 (age 70) Čepure, PR Serbia, FPR Yugoslavia
- Party: G17+ (2002–2013); POKS (2017–present)
- Education: Paraćin Gymnasium; University of Belgrade (no degree)
- Profession: Political scientist

Predrag Marković (Serbian Cyrillic: Предраг Марковић; born 7 December 1955) is a Serbian politician, author, and publisher who served as the President of the National Assembly of Serbia from 2004 to 2007 and as Minister of Culture, Media and Information Society from 2011 to 2012. A former member of G17 Plus, he also briefly served as acting President of Serbia until the election of Boris Tadić in 2004.

== Political career ==
Marković was President of the National Assembly of Serbia from 2004 to 2007 and the acting President of Serbia within Serbia and Montenegro between 4 March and 11 July 2004. In addition, he has been the president of the G17 Plus Management Board, the President of the G17 Plus Political Council and member of their Executive Board. In 2003, he was chosen as an honorary president of the G17 Plus Party.

During Marković's tenure as President of the National Assembly, the National Assembly unanimously returned the coat of arms, flag and anthem of Serbia on 17 August 2004 and on 5 June 2006 announced Serbia's sovereignty. Marković also organized the writing, declaring and signing of the Constitution of Serbia in 2006.

Marković was the Movement for the Restoration of the Kingdom of Serbia candidate for Mayor of Belgrade during the 2018 Belgrade City Assembly election. He finished with 4,291 votes.

== Literary career ==
Marković is a member of PEN, the Srpsko književno društvo (Serbian Literary Society) and is the former president of the Association of Publishers of Serbia and Montenegro. From 1993 to 2013, he was the owner of the Stubovi kulture (Pillars of Culture) publishing house. He has written six books and speaks Serbian, Russian, and Spanish.

== Personal life ==
Marković is known for keeping details from his personal life private. On 26 December 2015, Marković married Vesna (née Vujatović; born 1991). He has a son from a previous marriage.

== Published books ==
- L‘imun. Isceđen (1982)
- Morali bi doći nasmejani lavovi (1983)
- Otmenost duše (1989)
- Zavodnik ništavila (2017)
- Kovčeg komedijant (2018)
- David protiv Otužnog Zloduha (2020)

Government offices
Preceded by Vojislav Mihailović; Acting	President of Serbia; Acting; 2004	Succeeded by Boris Tadić
Preceded by Dragan Maršićanin	President of the National Assembly of Serbia; 2004–2007	Succeeded by Tomislav Nikolić
Preceded by Nebojša Bradić (Culture); Jasna Matić (Telecommunications and Information Society)	Minister of Culture, Media and Information Society; 2011–2012	Succeeded by Bratislav Petković
