= Bratislav Petković =

Serbian politician (1948–2021)

Bratislav Petković Братислав Петковић
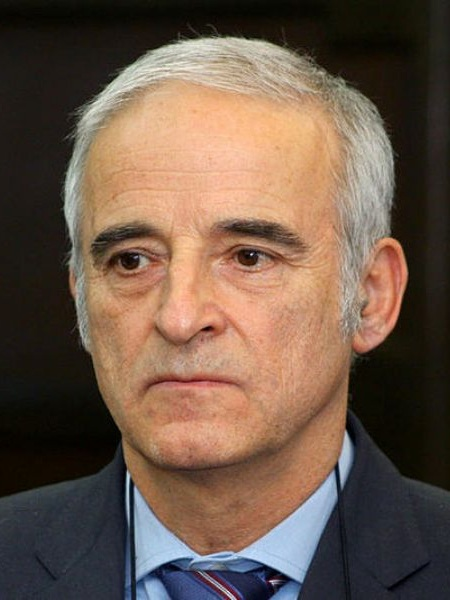

Minister of Culture and Information
- In office 27 July 2012 – 2 September 2013
- Preceded by: Predrag Marković
- Succeeded by: Ivan Tasovac

Personal details
- Born: 26 September 1948 Belgrade, Serbia, Yugoslavia
- Died: 9 May 2021 (aged 72) Belgrade, Serbia
- Party: Serbian Progressive Party

Bratislav Petković (Serbian: Братислав Петковић, pronounced [brǎtislaʋ pêtkoʋitɕ]; 26 September 1948 – 9 May 2021) was a Serbian film director, playwright, theater director, founder and director of the Automobile Museum and Modern Garage Theater in Belgrade.

He was a former Minister of Culture and Information in the Government of Serbia.

== Awards ==
- Order of Karađorđe's Star (posthumous, 2021)

Government offices
Preceded by Predrag Marković	Minister of Culture and Information; 2012–2013	Succeeded by Ivan Tasovac
