= Mihailo Jovanović (politician) =

Serbian politician (born 1972)

- Михаило Јовановић

Minister of Information and Telecommunications
- In office 26 October 2022 – 2 May 2024
- Prime Minister: Ana Brnabić
- Preceded by: Office re-established
- Succeeded by: Dejan Ristić

Personal details
- Born: 1972 (age 53–54) Belgrade, SR Serbia, SFR Yugoslavia
- Party: Independent
- Children: 2
- Education: University of Belgrade
- Occupation: Politician
- Profession: Engineer; economist

Mihailo Jovanović (Serbian Cyrillic: Михаило Јовановић; born 1972) is a Serbian engineer and politician who served as minister of information and telecommunications from 2022 to 2024.

== Early life ==
Mihailo Jovanović was born in 1972 in Belgrade, Socialist Republic of Serbia, Socialist Federal Republic of Yugoslavia. He graduated and earned his master's degree from the School of Electrical Engineering at the University of Belgrade. He received his doctorate in topics of economics in 2012.

== Career ==
He began his career at Pošta Srbije, where he worked in telecommunications. He also previously worked at Telekom Srbija. He was later appointed director of the Office for Information Technologies and Electronic Administration of the Government of Serbia in April 2017. He is a close associate of Ana Brnabić.

=== Minister of Information and Telecommunications ===
It was announced on 24 October 2022 that Jovanović would serve as minister of information and telecommunications in the third cabinet of Ana Brnabić. He was sworn in on 26 October.

== Personal life ==
Jovanović is married and has two children. He received two awards, in 2002 and 2022 respectively, due to his work on information technologies. He is a member of the Chamber of Engineers of Serbia.
