= President of Serbia =

Head of state

President of the Republic
- Председник Републике; Predsednik Republike
- Standard of the President of the Republic

- Incumbent; Aleksandar Čupić; Acting since 19 November 2026
- Head of state of Serbia; Executive branch; Secretariat-General of the President
- Style: Mr./Madam President (informal); His/Her Excellency (diplomatic)
- Status: Head of state
- Residence: Villa Mir, Konavljanska 2, Belgrade
- Seat: Novi Dvor, Andrićev Venac 1, Belgrade
- Appointer: Popular vote
- Term length: Five years, renewable once
- Constituting instrument: Constitution of Serbia (2006)
- Inaugural holder: Slobodan Milošević
- Formation: 11 January 1991; 35 years ago
- Deputy: President of the National Assembly
- Salary: din. 240,479 / €2,051 monthly
- Website: predsednik.rs

The president of Serbia (Serbian: Председник Србије, romanised: Predsednik Srbije), officially styled as President of the Republic (Serbian: Председник Републике, romanised: Predsednik Republike), is the head of state of Serbia, commander-in-chief of the armed forces, representing the country both at home and abroad. The president jointly exercises the executive power with the Government, headed by the Prime Minister.

The president is elected on the basis of universal suffrage, through a secret ballot, for a five-year term. If no candidate in the election secures more than 50% of all votes cast, a runoff election between the top two candidates from the first round is held. The Constitution sets a limit of a maximum of two terms in office.

The office has been vacant since 27 September 2026, when Aleksandar Vučić resigned. Ana Brnabić, as President of the National Assembly, assumed presidential duties the following day and served until 17 November 2026, when her term as president of the Assembly ended with the constitution of the 15th National Assembly. (Note: From 17 to 19 November 2026, no one formally acted as president. Stojan Radenović, the oldest deputy, chaired the constitutive session until the president of the Assembly was elected, but was neither president of the Assembly nor acting president of the Republic.) Since 19 November 2026, the office has been held in an acting capacity by Aleksandar Čupić, who was elected president of the National Assembly that day. The presidential election must be held by 27 December 2026.

== Powers and duties ==
The powers and duties of the president of Serbia are defined by the Constitution and the Law on the President of the Republic.

The Constitution sets up a parliamentary system, with the president being part of executive branch, although with limited executive powers since the Government acts as the chief executive body. However, the stature of some presidents, Boris Tadić and, especially, Aleksandar Vučić, was such that the office acquired greater influence than the one provisioned by the Constitution.

=== Exclusive powers ===
The president of the Republic has the authority to act independently in a specific domains.

One of the strongest powers is that of veto, which returns a bill to parliament. Although the veto may be overridden by parliament with an absolute majority vote of all deputies, the ability to refuse to sign legislation acts as a check on the power of the legislature. If the National Assembly again adopts the law that was previously vetoed by the president, the president then has to promulgate the law.

The president dissolves the National Assembly 90 days before the expiration of the National Assembly's convocation, after which parliamentary election has to be held in the next 60 days. The president also dissolves the National Assembly if a new government is not elected: within 90 days of the beginning of a new convocation, within 30 days of a vote of no confidence, or the acknowledgment of the resignation of the prime minister.

The president appoints five judges (out of fifteen) to the Constitutional Court for a nine-year term.

The president receives letters of credence and letters of recall from foreign diplomatic representatives in Serbia.

The president awards state decorations, typically at the ceremonies held twice per year – on the Statehood Day and Vidovdan.

=== Shared powers ===
There are some powers reserved to the president but can be exercised only under certain circumstances or with the assent of the Government.

Chief among these is the right to nominate a Prime Minister to the National Assembly, subject to consultations with parliamentary party leaders and the balance of power in the Assembly.

President has the right to dissolve the National Assembly and call snap parliamentary elections, subject to the proposal of the Government.

The president cooperates with the Government in the formulation and implementation of the foreign policy. The president appoints and dismisses ambassadors of Serbia, subject to the opinion of the Ministry of Foreign Affairs.

Although commander-in-chief of the Serbian Armed Forces, the president nevertheless is obliged to cooperate with the Government in the formulation and implementation of Serbia's defence policy and is supported in his duties by the Military Cabinet of the President, staffed by commissioned officers. He convenes and chairs the National Security Council. The president promotes and dismisses military officers, subject to the proposal of the Ministry of Defence.

The president is granted the right of pardon, subject to the opinion of the Ministry of Justice.

== Election and taking office ==
The president is elected on the basis of universal suffrage, through a secret ballot, for a five-year term. The Constitution sets a limit to a maximum of two terms in office and requires election dates to be determined 90 days before the expiry of the term of the incumbent president, for the election to be held in the next 60 days. If no candidate in the election secures more than 50% of the votes, a runoff election between the top two candidates from the first round is held in 14 days. In the second round, the candidate with the most votes wins. Any adult with Serbian citizenship can become a candidate for president; provided that the candidate is endorsed by 10,000 voters and nominated either by a citizens group, political party, or a coalition of political parties.

The term of office of the president begins on the day when the president takes the oath of office and ends when it formally expires or when the president resigns or is removed from the office by the National Assembly. The term of a president can be extended during wartime or state of emergency.

The inauguration ceremony is traditionally held at the House of the National Assembly in Belgrade. According to the Constitution, the text of the presidential oath of office is as follows:

I swear that I will dedicate my full efforts to the upholding the sovereignty and territorial integrity of the Republic of Serbia, including Kosovo and Metohija as its integral part, as well as the upholding of human and minority rights and freedoms, respect and defence of the Constitution and laws, ensuring of peace and well-being of all citizens of the Republic of Serbia, and that I will diligently and responsibly fulfil all my duties.

== Immunity and impeachment ==
The president of Serbia enjoys immunity—the president may not be arrested, nor can any criminal proceedings be instituted against the president without prior consent from the Constitutional Court.

The president is impeachable for any violation of the Constitution committed in performance of duty. Impeachment proceedings may be initiated by the National Assembly by a two-thirds majority vote of all members of the parliament. The Constitutional Court is then obliged to decide, within 45 days from the day the impeachment procedure is initiated, whether the president has violated the Constitution. If the Constitutional Court determines that the president has violated the Constitution, the president is dismissed if two-thirds of the deputies vote in favour of the impeachment.

== Vacancy or incapacity ==
In case of a temporary or permanent incapability by the president to discharge the duties of office, the president of the National Assembly assumes the office of acting president until the president resumes his duties, or until the election of a new president within three months of the permanent vacancy occurring. The president can be removed from office if at least two-thirds of members of the National Assembly vote in favour of his removal.

Dragan Tomić served as acting president between Milošević's and Milutinović's terms as presidents, while Nataša Mićić, Dragan Maršićanin, Vojislav Mihailović, and Predrag Marković served as acting presidents between Milutinović's and Tadić's terms as presidents. Mihailović only served for one day. Slavica Đukić Dejanović served as acting president between Tadić's and Nikolić's terms as presidents. After Vučić's resignation in September 2026, Ana Brnabić served as acting president until her term as president of the Assembly ended on 17 November 2026. Her successor as president of the Assembly, Aleksandar Čupić, has been acting president since 19 November 2026.

== Privileges ==
As of 2025, the president receives a net monthly salary of 240,479 RSD (€2,051).

The Villa Mir in Dedinje neighborhood of Belgrade, is the official residence of the president. It has area of 4,000 square metres (43,000 sq ft) and is primarily used for informal receptions of visiting foreign dignitaries.

For ground travel, the president is provided with armoured, high-security vehicles. These are typically luxury sedans such as Mercedes-Benz, BMW, or Audi models. The president’s ground transport typically includes a motorcade consisting of multiple vehicles such as lead cars, security cars, and support vehicles. Air travel for president is provided by the Dassault Falcon 6X of the Government Aviation Service, for long-distance air travel, and by the Airbus H215 of the Police Helicopter Unit, for short-distance air travel.

As head of state, the president receives the highest level of protection and at all times has an armed security detail (both in Serbia and abroad), provided by the Detachment of the Military Police for Special Operations "Cobras" of the Serbian Armed Forces.

Former presidents of Serbia as well as Serbian presidents of Serbia and Montenegro have the right to hold the title Former president of the Republic (Serbian: Бивши председник Републике, romanised: Bivši predsednik Republike) and attend state ceremonials in accordance with the protocol. For up to six months beyond the end of their term, former presidents can also receive 80% of the presidential salary until they obtain a job or retire. Additionally, former presidents have the right to an office, adviser, secretary, and a car with a driver for the amount of time they served in the office.

== Secretariat-General of the President ==
The Secretariat-General of the President of the Republic (Serbian: Генерални секретаријат Председника Републике, romanised: Generalni sekretarijat Predsednika Republike) is the office that provides assistance to the president of Serbia in conducting his duties. It consists of the Bureau of the Secretariat-General, headed by the Secretary-General, tasked with technical support, and the Cabinet, headed by the Chief of the Cabinet, mainly consisted of advisors to the president.

== Novi Dvor ==
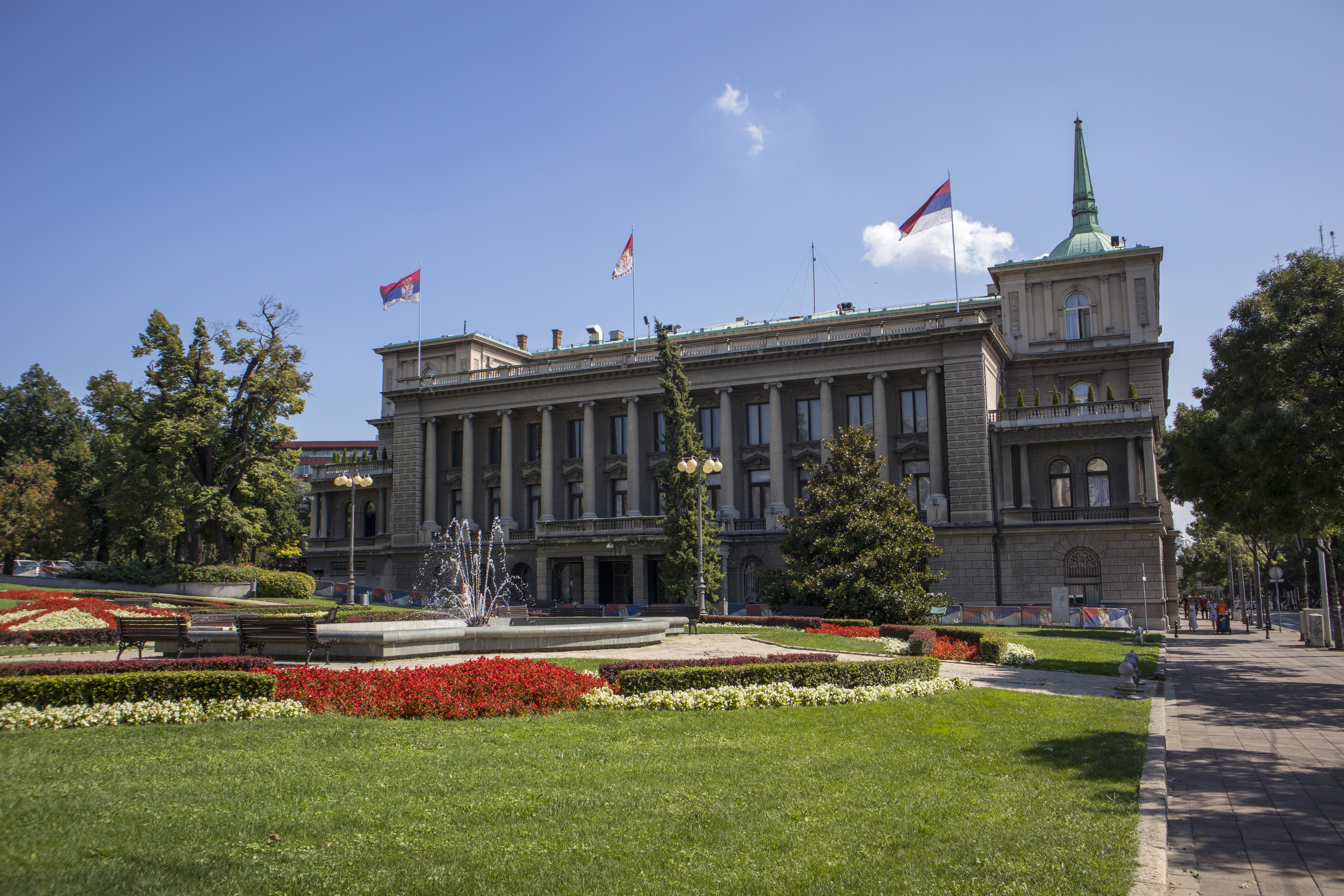
Novi Dvor, the seat of the president

The official workplace of the president is Novi Dvor, located at Andrićev Venac 1, in Belgrade. It was a royal residence of the Karađorđević dynasty of Kingdom of Yugoslavia from 1922 to 1934, after which the building was transformed into the Royal Museum, subsequently renamed the Prince Paul Museum, from 1936 until 1941 and the outbreak of the World War II in Yugoslavia. After the World War II, the reconstruction and new use of Novi Dvor served the broader objective of transforming it into the administrative seat of the Socialist Republic of Serbia: between 1953 and 1974 Novi Dvor has housed the Presidency of the National Assembly while from 1974 to 1990 it accommodated the Presidency of the Socialist Republic. Since 1990, it is the seat of the President of the Republic.

== History ==
The precursor to the office of the President of the Republic was the Presidency of the Socialist Republic of Serbia (Serbian: Председништво Социјалистичке Републике Србије, romanised: Predsedništvo Socijalisticke Republike Srbije). Introduced by the 1974 Constitution, it was a body of fifteen members who formed a collective presidency with the president of the Presidency at its primus inter pares. The Presidency of the Socialist Republic of Serbia consisted of 11 members (president, vice-president, and 9 members), elected by the Assembly of the Socialist Republic of Serbia, as well as 4 ex-officio members: the president of the Central Committee of the League of Communists of Serbia, the president of the Assembly of the Socialist Republic of Serbia, and the presidents of the presidencies of the Socialist Autonomous Province of Vojvodina and the Socialist Autonomous Province of Kosovo.

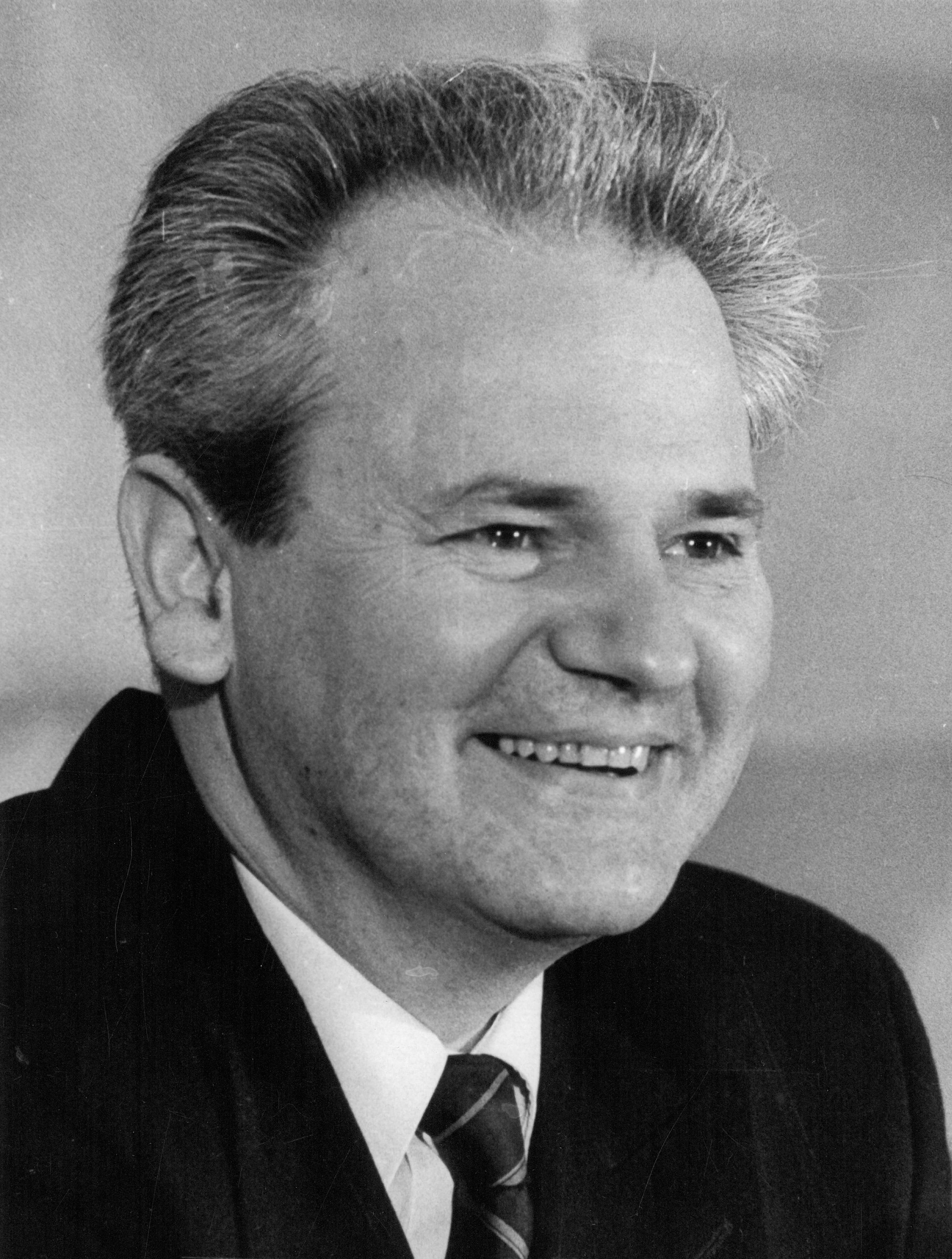
Slobodan Milošević, the first president of Serbia

The Presidency existed until 1990 when a new Constitution was adopted, which introduced a semi-presidential system and established the post of President of the Republic. Following first multi-party elections in Serbia after the World War II, held in December 1990, Slobodan Milošević was the first to be elected to the office of the president of the Republic of Serbia. Milošević remained in office until the 1997 presidential election. Considering that the turnout in the election was less than 50%, a new election was scheduled for December 1997, which was won by Milan Milutinović. Once Milutinović's term ended, election was called for September 2002. However, the turnout in the second round was lower than 50%, and therefore a new election had to be called for December 2002, which also had the same outcome. In 2003, a new election was scheduled, however, the election's turnout was again lower than 50%. In the 2004 election, however, Boris Tadić was elected president after the turnout rules were abolished.

The new Constitution, adopted in 2006, provided for a parliamentary system. Tadić won the 2008 early presidential election and was re-elected as president. Tadić resigned as president in 2012 for the presidential election to be held concurrently with the parliamentary election, only to lose it to Tomislav Nikolić thus becoming the first president to resign from office. Nikolić resigned as president of the Serbian Progressive Party upon assuming office and remained in office until 2017, when he was succeeded by Aleksandar Vučić. Vučić won his second term after winning in the 2022 election. He resigned on 27 September 2026, ahead of the 2026 snap parliamentary election.

== See also ==
- Politics of Serbia
- Prime Minister of Serbia
