= Ivan Tasovac =

Serbian pianist, manager, and politician (1966–2021)

- Иван Тасовац
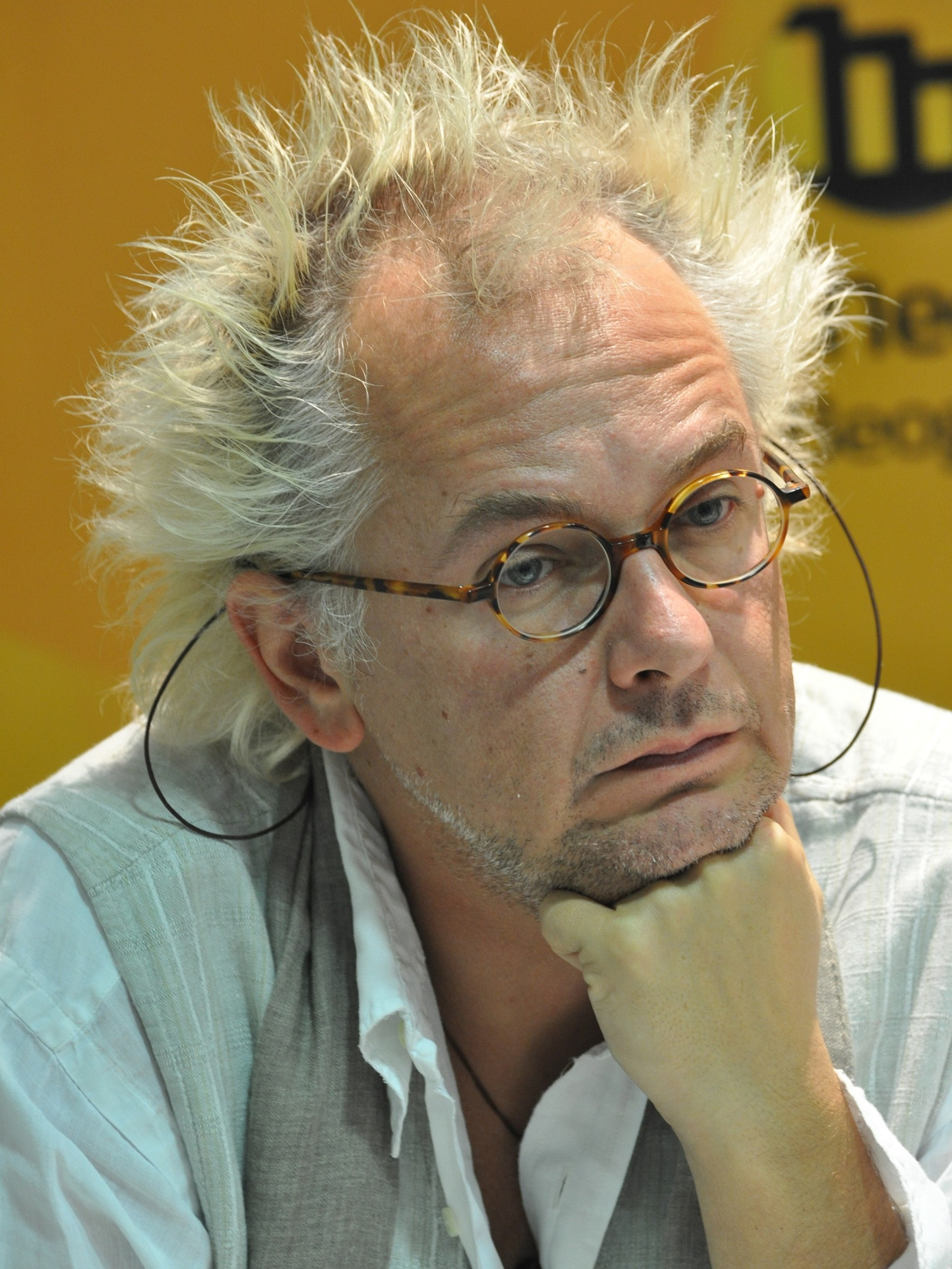
- Tasovac in 2013

Minister of Culture and Information
- In office 2 September 2013 – 11 August 2016
- Preceded by: Bratislav Petković
- Succeeded by: Vladan Vukosavljević

Personal details
- Born: 21 June 1966 Belgrade, Serbia, Yugoslavia
- Died: 29 September 2021 (aged 55) Belgrade, Serbia
- Party: Serbian Progressive Party
- Parent: Predrag Tasovac (father)
- Occupation: Pianist

Ivan Tasovac (Serbian Cyrillic: Иван Тасовац; 21 June 1966 – 29 September 2021) was a Serbian pianist and manager. He served as the director of Belgrade Philharmonic Orchestra from 2001 to 2013. He also served as the Minister of Culture and Information in the Government of Serbia from 2013 to 2016 and was elected to the National Assembly of Serbia in the 2020 Serbian parliamentary election.

== Early life and education ==
Ivan Tasovac was born on 21 June 1966 to actor Predrag Tasovac and Marija, who was piano professor at the music school "Mokranjac" in Belgrade. He graduated piano at the Moscow State Tchaikovsky Conservatory in the class of professor Sergei Dorensky.

== Career ==
From 23 March 2001 to 22 November 2013, he served as the general manager of the Belgrade Philharmonic Orchestra. He was also a member of the jury in the Serbian version of the international Got Talent show.

He served as a Minister of Culture and Information in the Government of Serbia from 2013 to 2016.

After stepping down from a Government office, he went back to be a Belgrade Philharmonic Orchestra general manager.

Tasovac received the ninth position on the Progressive Party's Aleksandar Vučić — For Our Children list for the 2020 Serbian parliamentary election, running as a non-party candidate. This was tantamount to election, and he was indeed elected when the list won a landslide majority with 188 mandates. He was a member of the assembly's culture and information committee, a deputy member of the foreign affairs committee, a substitute member of Serbia's delegation to the Parliamentary Assembly of the Council of Europe, and a member of the parliamentary friendship groups with China, Israel, Russia, and the United States of America.

== Personal life ==
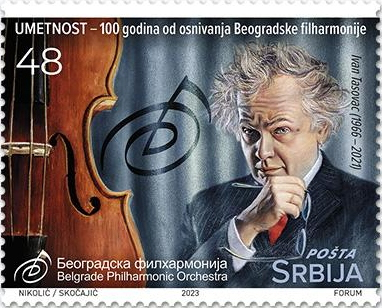
Tasovac on a 2023 stamp of Serbia

On 30 December 2018, Tasovac got seriously injured while playing recreational basketball, breaking spine vertebra. He was immediately transferred to the Emergency Center. In an interview he gave in March 2019, Tasovac said that he went out of hospital in February 2019 and that while in hospital, doctors have also detected and removed a spinal cord tumor that was developing unnoticed in his body for a decade.

Tasovac died on 29 September 2021, at his home in Belgrade.

Government offices
Preceded by Bratislav Petković	Minister of Culture and Information; 2013–2016	Succeeded by Vladan Vukosavljević
