= Fevzija Murić =

Serbian politician (born 1959)

- Born: Fevzija Murić; May 12, 1959 (age 67)
- Occupation: Politician
- Known for: Former mayor of Novi Pazar

Fevzija Murić (Serbian Cyrillic: Февзија Мурић; born 12 May 1959) is a politician in Serbia from the country's Bosniak community. He was the mayor of Novi Pazar from 1996 to 1997, a member of the National Assembly of Serbia from 1997 to 2001, and a secretary of state in the Serbian government from 2007 to 2008. He has also served several terms on the Novi Pazar city council (i.e., the executive branch of the city government). Murić has led the Party for Sandžak (Stranka za Sandžak, SZS) since 2001.

== Early life and private career ==
Murić was born in Novi Pazar, in the Sandžak region of what was then the People's Republic of Serbia in the Federal People's Republic of Yugoslavia. He completed his early education in the community and later graduated from the Faculty of Stomatology at the University of Sarajevo in what was then the Socialist Republic of Bosnia and Herzegovina. He was president of the Muslim humanitarian organization Merhamet-Sandžak from 1991 to 2001.

== Politician ==
=== Party of Democratic Action of Sandžak ===
Murić became politically active in the early 1990s as a member of the Party of Democratic Action of Sandžak (Stranka demokratske akcije Sandžaka, SDA). During this period, the political culture of Serbia and Yugoslavia was dominated by Slobodan Milošević and his allies, many Bosniaks were boycotting state institutions, and the SDA-dominated Muslim National Council of Sandžak had taken some steps toward establishing parallel institutions.

When the SDA split into rival factions led by party leader Sulejman Ugljanin and Rasim Ljajić in January 1995, Murić sided with Ugljanin, who was then in exile in Turkey following charges that he had distributed arms to the Bosniak community in the Sandžak. Murić was prominent in organizing a petition drive for Ugljanin and his allies to be amnestied. He criticized Ljajić's faction for entering into negotiations to the Serbian government in May 1995, arguing that negotiations could only take place after Milošević recognized Bosnia and Herzegovina and would need to be based on the Muslim National Council's Memorandum on the Establishment of Special Status for Sandžak, a strongly autonomist document.

Ugljanin ultimately returned to Serbia and was elected to the Assembly of the Federal Republic of Yugoslavia in the 1996 federal election. The SDA-led List for Sandžak coalition won a majority victory in the election for the Novi Pazar municipal assembly in the concurrent 1996 Serbian local elections; Murić was among the SDA candidates elected and was chosen as the assembly's president, a position that was at the time equivalent to mayor, on 26 November 1996. He did not serve in office for long; the Serbian government dissolved the local administration in July 1997, alleging that it had provoked national and religious intolerance. The specific point of contention was the municipal government's decision to fly the SDA flag between the flags of Serbia and Yugoslavia on a municipal building. Murić later said that the Serbian government had taken an antagonistic stance to the List for Sandžak's administration from the beginning.

==== Parliamentarian ====
Murić appeared in the lead position on the List for Sandžak's electoral list for the Kraljevo division in the 1997 Serbian parliamentary election and was elected when the list won two mandates. The List for Sandžak won three seats in total, and its members served in opposition to Serbia's coalition government led by Milošević's Socialist Party of Serbia (Socijalistička partija Srbije, SPS) in the term that followed.

Various Serbian opposition parties formed the Democratic Opposition of Serbia (Demokratska opozicija Srbije, DOS) coalition in early 2000. Murić criticized the DOS's platform in March of that year, describing it as "meagre and pretty disappointing" and arguing that it left little room for the recognition of Serbia's multi-ethnic character.

DOS candidate Vojislav Koštunica defeated Milošević in the 2000 Yugoslavian presidential election, a watershed moment in Serbian and Yugoslavian politics. The List for Sandžak won a majority victory in Novi Pazar in the concurrent 2000 local elections. Murić was re-elected to the municipal assembly, although he did not return to the mayor's office.

Serbia's government fell after the Yugoslavian election, and a new Serbian parliamentary election was called for December 2000. The List for Sandžak did not contest the election, and Murić's term in the national assembly came to an end in January 2001.

Murić was also a member of the Bosniak National Council during this time.

=== Party for Sandžak ===
==== Early years (2001–04) ====
Murić broke with Ugljanin almost immediately after his parliamentary term ended. In January 2001, he convened the first assembly of the Party for Sandžak and was chosen as its representative. The party was registered at the federal level in July 2001 and held its first electoral assembly in the same month. Murić formally became the party's leader at this time; in so doing, he called for the Sandžak to remain a united and autonomous entity in the event of the Federal Republic of Yugoslavia's disintegration.

In September 2002, Murić announced the Party for Sandžak's support for Miroljub Labus in the September–October 2002 Serbian presidential election. He later called for a boycott of the December 2002 presidential election and urged new elections at all levels of government. Both presidential elections were invalidated due to low turnout.

Murić and other SZS members were expelled from the Novi Pazar municipal assembly in November 2002 on the grounds that, having left the SDA, they had lost the party affiliation under which they were elected. Murić sought re-election to the assembly in a January 2003 by-election and finished a distant third, as the local electorate became increasingly polarized between Ugljanin's SDA and Rasim Ljajić's Sandžak Democratic Party (Sandžačka demokratska partija, SDP).

In August 2003, Murić indicated that the SZS would not participate in the pending indirect elections for the Bosniak National Council, describing them as an undemocratic cover for Ugljanin's interests and those of the Serbian state.

Murić brought the Party for Sandžak into the Together for Tolerance (Zajedno za toleranciju, ZZT) coalition in the 2003 Serbian parliamentary election and received the 141st position on the coalition's electoral list. During this period, mandates in Serbian parliamentary elections were awarded at the discretion of sponsoring parties or coalitions irrespective of numerical order, and Murić's list position had no specific bearing on his chances of election. In any event, the list did not cross the electoral threshold for assembly representation.

Murić later called for a boycott of the 2004 Serbian presidential election. He criticized Ugljanin for endorsing Democratic Party (Demokratska stranka, DS) candidate Boris Tadić, arguing that the DS's platform did not recognize regionalization in Serbia.

==== Cooperation with the SDP (2004–08) ====
Serbia introduced both the direct election of mayors and proportional representation for local assembly elections in the 2004 local elections. Murić ran as the Party for Sandžak's candidate for mayor of Novi Pazar and was defeated in the first round, finishing third. The overall results were mixed: Ugljanin was elected as mayor, but the SDA did not win a majority of seats in the municipal assembly, and the SDP was able to form a coalition government with parties representing Novi Pazar's Serb community. The SZS won three seats and participated in the SDP-led administration, and Murić was appointed as a member of the municipal council in early 2005. In April 2005, he accused Ugljanin and his associates of having damaged the municipality by several million Euros during the previous administration.

In March 2006, Murić initiated a recall election against Ugljanin, which was ultimately unsuccessful. The political life of Novi Pazar was very tense and divisive during this period, and in April 2006 a bomb exploded outside Murić's house. No-one was hurt, though his property was damaged.

Serbia held early elections for Novi Pazar's municipal assembly on 11 September 2006. The SDA won a convincing victory, and the SZS fell below the electoral threshold. A new municipal administration was formed, and Murić's term on council came to an end.

Murić announced the Party for Sandžak's support for the DS in the 2007 Serbian parliamentary election, on the basis of its cooperation with the SDP. The DS participated in an unstable coalition government after the election, and Murić was appointed as a secretary of state in Serbia's ministry of state administration and local self-government, a role that he held until 2008. In August 2007, he led a delegation of Serbian officials on an official visit to China. In the 2008 Serbian presidential election, he supported Boris Tadić's successful bid for re-election.

==== Alliance with the SDP (2008–present) ====
Serbia discontinued the direct election of mayors with the 2008 Serbian local elections. The SDP won the election in Novi Pazar and again formed a coalition government with parties representing the Serb community. The List for Sandžak did not win any mandates.

In November 2008, Ljajić and Murić signed a formal agreement of partnership between the SDP and the SZS, and Murić was again appointed as a member of city council. He served for the remainder of the term. In February 2009, he announced that all parking in Novi Pazar would be free until further notice, as the parking ordinance enacted by the previous administration had been found to be inconsistent with the law.

The SZS contested the 2012 Serbian local elections in Novi Pazar as part of the SDP's alliance, which won the election and afterward formed a new coalition government. After the election, Murić was appointed as assistant to SDP mayor Meho Mahmutović with responsibility for social activities, health, and social policy. In February 2015, he was reassigned as a member of city council.

The SZS's alliance with the SDP continued into the 2016 Serbian local elections. The SDP again won in Novi Pazar; Murić was re-appointed to city council and served for the term that followed.

The SDP won an increased victory in Novi Pazar in the 2020 local elections and Murić was re-appointed to council with responsibility for health and social policy, a position that he continues to hold as of 2022.

== Electoral record ==
=== Municipal (Novi Pazar) ===
2004 Municipality of Novi Pazar local election: Mayor of Novi Pazar
Candidate	Party	First round		Second round	
Candidate	Party	Votes	%	Votes	%
Sulejman Ugljanin	Coalition: List for Sandžak Dr. Sulejman Ugljanin (Affiliation: Party of Democratic Action of Sandžak)	14,147	42.87	18,863	52.33
Sait Kačapor	SDP–Rasim Ljajić	10,624	32.19	17,180	47.67
Fevzija Murić	Party for Sandžak Dr. Fevzija Murić	2,373	7.19		
Milan Veselinović	Serbian Radical Party–Tomislav Nikolić	2,127	6.45		
Milutin Cvetić	Serbian Democratic Alliance – Coalition: DSS, Citizens' Group, SPS, SPO, NS, DA, SSJ, DHSS	1,618	4.90		
Tarik Imamović Dip. Ing. El. Teh.	Sandžak Alternative	702	2.13		
Ruždija Agušević	Citizens' Group	518	1.57		
Dragić Pavlović	Strength of Serbia Movement	353	1.07		
Mehmed Slezović	G17 Plus	289	0.88		
Zehnija Bulić	Sandžak Democratic Union	250	0.76		
Total		33,001	100.00	36,043	100.00

2003 Municipality of Novi Pazar by-election: Novi Pazar Municipal Assembly, Parice II, 19 January and 9 February 2003
Candidate	Party	Votes	%
Munir Poturak	Sandžak Democratic Party	514	52.66
Danaba Hodžić	List for Sandžak	432	44.26
Fevzija Murić	Party for Sandžak	26	2.66
Erkin Kačar	European Party	4	0.41
Slavoljub Mijajlović	Democratic Party	0	0.00
Total		976	100.00
