= Milan Veselinović =

Serbian politician (born 1956)

Milan Veselinović (Serbian Cyrillic: Милан Веселиновић; born 24 December 1956) is a Serbian politician. He has served in the parliaments of Serbia and the Federal Republic of Yugoslavia, been a deputy minister in the Serbian government, and held high political office at the city level in Novi Pazar. He is a member of the far-right Serbian Radical Party (Srpska radikalna stranka, SRS).

== Early life and career ==
Veselinović was born to an ethnically Serb family in the predominantly Bosniak community of Novi Pazar, in the Sandžak region of what was then the People's Republic of Serbia in the Federal People's Republic of Yugoslavia. Raised in the community, he graduated from the higher pedagogical school in Priština with a focus on mathematics and holds an engineering degree from the University of Belgrade's Faculty of Organizational Sciences. He has worked as a mathematics and informatics teacher.

== Politician ==
=== Federal parliamentarian (1992–1996) ===
Veselinović appeared on the Radical Party's electoral list for the Chamber of Citizens in the Kragujevac division in the December 1992 Yugoslavian parliamentary election. The list won four of twelve available seats, and he was selected for the party's fourth and final mandate. The Socialist Party of Serbia (Socijalistička partija Srbije) won the election, and the Radicals served in opposition for the term that followed. Available online sources do not indicate if Veselinović was a candidate in the 1996 Yugoslavian election; the Radicals did not in any event win any seats in the redistributed division of Kraljevo (which included Novi Pazar) that year, and his term as a federal parliamentarian came to an end.

In November 1996, he blamed Serbian president and SPS leader Slobodan Milošević for the rise of Sulejman Ugljanin's Bosniak autonomist political organization in the Sandžak.

=== Deputy Minister and various candidacies (1997–2003) ===
Veselinović appeared in the second position on the SRS's list for Kraljevo in the 1997 Serbian parliamentary election. The list won two seats, and he was not chosen for a mandate. (From 1992 to 2000, Serbia's electoral law stipulated that one-third of parliamentary mandates would be assigned to candidates from successful lists in numerical order, while the remaining two-thirds would be distributed amongst other candidates at the discretion of the sponsoring parties. It was common practice for the latter mandates to be awarded out of order. Veselinović was not automatically elected, and the party's optional mandate for Kraljevo went to third-ranked candidate Miroljub Veljković.)

In early 1998, the SPS formed a new coalition government in Serbia with the SRS and the Yugoslav Left (Jugoslovenska Levica, JUL). Veselinović was appointed as deputy minister of education in the new ministry. In February 2000, he became one of a number of Serbian officials placed under international sanctions in the aftermath of the Kosovo War.

Veselinović was given the second position on the Radical Party's list for Kraljevo in the 2000 Yugoslavian election; once again, the party did not win any seats in the division. He also ran for Novi Pazar's fourth division in the concurrent 2000 Serbian local elections and was the only SRS candidate elected to the municipal assembly that year.

Slobodan Milošević was defeated in the 2000 Yugoslavian election, a watershed moment in Serbian and Yugoslavian politics. Serbia's government fell shortly thereafter, and Veselinović's term as a deputy minister ended in October 2000. A new Serbian parliamentary election was subsequently called for December 2000; prior to the vote, Serbia's electoral laws were reformed such that the entire country became a single electoral division and all mandates were awarded to candidates on successful lists at the discretion of the sponsoring parties or coalitions, irrespective of numerical order. Veselinović appeared in the 102nd position on the Radical Party's list and was not chosen for a mandate when the list won twenty-three seats.

In February 2003, Veselinović warned that attempts to introduce the Bosniak language into official use in the Sandžak would create greater divisions between the Serb and Bosniak communities. He contended that the initiative was a cynical attempt by Ugljanin's political alliance to protect its support base and would be received poorly by the Serb population.

=== Member of the National Assembly and local official (2004–2012) ===
==== 2004–2008 ====
Veselinović was given the eighty-second position on the Radical Party's list in the 2003 Serbian parliamentary election. The Radicals won eighty-two seats, emerging as the largest group in the assembly but falling well short of a majority and ultimately serving in opposition. Veselinović was not initially included in his party's delegation but was given a mandate on 17 February 2004 as the replacement for another party member. In the assembly, he served on the education committee and the committee for inter-communal relations.

Notwithstanding his membership in a Serbian nationalist party, Veselinović has frequently worked in conjunction with Bosniak parties in Novi Pazar. In the 2004 Serbian presidential election, he appealed to Bosniaks to vote for Radical Party candidate Tomislav Nikolić in the second round.

Serbia introduced the direct election of mayors in the early 2000s, and Veselinović ran as the SRS's candidate in Novi Pazar in the 2004 local elections. He was defeated, finishing fourth in the first round of voting. He also led the party's list in the concurrent election for the municipal assembly and was elected when the list won four seats. The overall results of the election were mixed: Ugljanin won the mayoral election, but his List for Sandžak coalition did not win a majority of seats in the local assembly. The rival Sandžak Democratic Party (Sandžačka demokratska partija, SDP) was able to form a local administration with other parties, including the Radicals; Veselinović was the main negotiator for the party's entry into the government, although he did not personally receive a seat on the municipal council (i.e., the executive branch of the local government).

The political scene in Novi Pazar was extremely tense in this period, and dual rule of Ugljanin and a SDP-led administration was unstable. The government of Serbia ultimately dissolved the local assembly and called a new assembly election for 11 September 2006. Ugljanin's List for Sandžak won a convincing victory, and the Radicals fell to two mandates. Veselinović was personally re-elected to the assembly and served in opposition for the next two years. The direct election of mayors proved to be a short-lived experiment and was abolished after this time.

Veselinović was not a candidate for re-election to the national assembly in the 2007 Serbian parliamentary election.

==== 2008–2012 ====
Veselinović appeared in the 155th position on the Radical Party's list in the 2008 parliamentary election and was given a mandate for a second term when the list won seventy-eight seats. The overall results of the election were inconclusive, but the For a European Serbia (Za evropsku Srbiju, ZES) alliance ultimately formed a coalition government with the SPS, and the Radicals again served in opposition. In this term, Veselinović served on the transport and communications committee and the privatization committee and was a member of the parliamentary friendship groups with Bosnia and Herzegovina and Slovakia. Many SRS delegates left the party in late 2008 to form the more moderate Serbian Progressive Party (Srpska napredna stranka, SNS); Veselinović remained with the Radicals.

Veselinović was also re-elected to the Novi Pazar assembly in the 2008 local elections, which took place concurrently with the parliamentary vote, at the head of the "United Serb List," which also included the SPS, the Democratic Party of Serbia (Demokratska stranka Srbije, DSS) and New Serbia (Nova Srbija, NS). The SDP won the election and returned to power in an alliance with the Serb parties; as part of this agreement, Veselinović was appointed as president (i.e., speaker) of the city assembly in July 2008. This was the source of some controversy, as the SDP was by this time part of the ZES coalition at the republic level, and other parties in the coalition disapproved of the decision to appoint a Radical. The city's government was restructured in September 2009, and Veselinović stood down as speaker at that time.

== 2012 and after ==
Serbia's electoral system was again reformed in 2011, such that mandates were awarded to candidates on successful lists in numerical order. Veselinović was given the seventy-first position on the Radical Party's list in the 2012 parliamentary election. The list fell below the electoral threshold for assembly representation. He also led a combined list of the Radicals and the SPS's coalition for the 2012 local elections in Novi Pazar. This list fell below the threshold as well.

For the 2016 local elections in Novi Pazar, Veselinović appeared in the second position on a coalition list of the Radicals, the DSS, and Dveri. Once again, the list did not cross the threshold.

== Electoral record ==
=== Local (Novi Pazar) ===
2004 Municipality of Novi Pazar local election: Mayor of Novi Pazar
| Candidate | Party | First round | | Second round | |
| Candidate | Party | Votes | % | Votes | % |
|---|---|---|---|---|---|
| Sulejman Ugljanin | Coalition: List for Sandžak Dr. Sulejman Ugljanin (Affiliation: Party of Democratic Action of Sandžak) | 14,147 | 42.87 | 18,863 | 52.33 |
| Sait Kačapor | SDP–Rasim Ljajić | 10,624 | 32.19 | 17,180 | 47.67 |
| Fevzija Murić | Party for Sandžak Dr. Fevzija Murić | 2,373 | 7.19 | | |
| Milan Veselinović | Serbian Radical Party–Tomislav Nikolić | 2,127 | 6.45 | | |
| Milutin Cvetić | Serbian Democratic Alliance – Coalition: DSS, Citizens' Group, SPS, SPO, NS, DA, SSJ, DHSS | 1,618 | 4.90 | | |
| Tarik Imamović Dip. Ing. El. Teh. | Sandžak Alternative | 702 | 2.13 | | |
| Ruždija Agušević | Citizens' Group | 518 | 1.57 | | |
| Dragić Pavlović | Strength of Serbia Movement | 353 | 1.07 | | |
| Mehmed Slezović | G17 Plus | 289 | 0.88 | | |
| Zehnija Bulić | Sandžak Democratic Union | 250 | 0.76 | | |
| Total | | 33,001 | 100.00 | 36,043 | 100.00 |
