= Radovan Radović (politician) =

Serbian politician

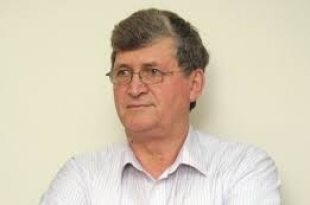
- Born: 18 September 1951 (age 74); Kamenjača, PR Serbia, FPR Yugoslavia

Radovan Radović (Serbian Cyrillic: Радован Радовић; born 18 September 1951), commonly known as Raka, is a retired politician in Serbia. He served several terms in the Serbian and Yugoslavian parliaments between 1991 and 1997 and was the mayor of Trstenik from 2004 to 2008. For many years a member of the Socialist Party of Serbia (Socijalistička partija Srbije, SPS), he later founded his own Our Home Serbia (Naš dom Srbija, NDS) party and has been a member of the Serbian Progressive Party (Srpska napredna stranka, SNS) since 2013.

== Early life and career ==
Radović was born in Kamenjača in the municipality of Trstenik, in what was then the People's Republic of Serbia in the Federal People's Republic of Yugoslavia. He attended higher technical and mechanical school in Trstenik and was later a student at the University of Belgrade Faculty of Mechanical Engineering, although he did not graduate. He returned to the Trstenik area after leaving university and worked for a time as director of waterworks maintenance at Prva Petoletka. In 1978, he left this position in order to focus on farming. He now operates a fruit and vegetable canning company.

Prior to 1990, Radović was a member of the League of Communists of Serbia.

== Politician ==
=== Parliamentarian (1991–97) ===
Radović was first elected to the National Assembly of Serbia in the 1990 parliamentary election, winning in Trstenik's first division. At the time, he was known as a loyalist supporter of SPS leader Slobodan Milošević. The Socialists won a majority victory, and Radović served as a supporter of the administration.

In April 1992, during the breakup of Yugoslavia, the republics of Serbia and Montenegro created a new federation which they called the Federal Republic of Yugoslavia. The new federal entity had a bicameral parliament, and the members of its upper house (the Chamber of Republics) were nominated by the republican parliaments. Radović was included in Serbia's first delegation to this body in May 1992. He also continued serving in the Serbian assembly.

Serbia introduced a system of proportional representation for republic-level elections in 1992. Radović was given the ninth position on the SPS's electoral list in Kragujevac for the December 1992 parliamentary election and was awarded a mandate when the list won eleven seats. (From 1992 to 2000, Serbia's electoral law stipulated that one-third of parliamentary mandates would be assigned to candidates on successful lists in numerical order, while the remaining two-thirds would be distributed amongst other candidates at the discretion of sponsoring parties or coalitions. Radović did not receive an automatic mandate, though he was included in the SPS's delegation all the same.) He was also selected for a second term in the Chamber of Republics when the new assembly convened in early 1993. The Socialists won a minority victory in 1992 and initially governed in an informal alliance with the far-right Serbian Radical Party (Srpska radikalna stranka, SRS).

This SPS–SRS alliance broke down in mid-1993, and another parliamentary election was held in December of that year. Radović received the fifth position on the SPS's list in Kragujevac and was again granted a mandate when the list won twelve seats. The Socialists increased their seat total in this election and afterward formed a new administration with New Democracy (Nova Demokratija, ND). Radović once again served as a government supporter, although he was not re-appointed to the federal parliament.

In parliament, Radović became a minor celebrity for his rustic mannerisms and his rough, often crude, manner of debating. His speeches soon became known as theatrical spectacles, and several of his comments were quoted in Serbian papers for their outrageous quality. In one particularly infamous instance, he invited a female assembly delegate to his farm to measure the length of his corncob. On another occasion, he said that monkeys failed to evolve because they ate bananas instead of more nutritious apples. Radical Party delegate Stevo Dragišić said of Radović, "This man does not fall into the category of human being, but rather of fauna"; it was reported that Radović afterward spat at Dragišić in the assembly hallway.

Radović was appointed as acting director of Radio Television of Serbia's newly created Trstenik studio in 1995. He was removed after the opposition's victory in the municipality in the 1996 Serbian local elections; after leaving office, he re-entered the studios surreptitiously and left with the station van, a high-range transmitter, and some equipment. He claimed he had personally signed for the materials in question; unsurprisingly, the station disagreed and demanded their return.

When Slobodan Milošević was chosen as president of the Federal Republic of Yugoslavia in July 1997, Radović and fellow Socialist parliamentarian Dobrivoje Budimirović sang a duet in praise of Milošević in the national assembly, with the words, "Slobodane, Slobodane ti si ko komunista, volimo te, volimo te ko Isusa Hrista." (English: "Slobodan, Slobodan, you are a communist. We love you, we love you like Jesus Christ.")

He was excluded from the SPS's electoral list in the 1997 parliamentary election, apparently because he opposed the party's alliance with the Yugoslav Left (Jugoslovenska Levica, JUL) led by Milošević's wife Mirjana Marković. His final term in parliament ended that year.

=== Since 1997 ===
Radović was excluded from the SPS entirely by its Trstenik branch in 1999, a decision he did not accept as valid. He later became vice-president of a new party called the Workers' Movement; in the 2000 Yugoslavian parliamentary election, he was the party's list bearer and ran as its lead candidate in Kraljevo. The party did not win any seats.

The Democratic Opposition of Serbia (Demokratska opozicija Srbije, DOS) defeated the SPS in the 2000 Yugoslavian election, an event that brought about large-scale changes in Serbian and Yugoslavian politics. A new Serbian parliamentary election was held later in the year; prior to the vote, Serbia's electoral system was reformed such that the entire country became a single electoral division and all mandates were awarded to candidates on successful lists at the discretion of the sponsoring parties or coalitions, irrespective of numerical order. Radović joined the newly formed Democratic Socialist Party (Demokratska Socijalistička Partija, DSP) and appeared in the eighth position on its list. The party did not cross the electoral threshold for assembly representation.

Radović later started a new party called Our Home Serbia. He was announced as the party's candidate in the September–October 2002 Serbian presidential election, although he withdrew prior to the vote. Our Home Serbia contested the 2003 parliamentary election as part of the For National Unity alliance, and Radović appeared in the fifth position on its list. The list did not cross the electoral threshold.

He last sought election to the national assembly in the 2007 parliamentary election, when he was granted a position on a coalition list of the Party of United Pensioners of Serbia (Partija ujedinjenih penzionera Srbije, PUPS) and the Social Democratic Party (Socijaldemokratska partija, SDP). This list, too, did not cross the threshold.

He called for creating a club for former parliamentarians in 2018.

==== Municipal politics ====
Serbia briefly introduced the direct election of mayors in the 2004 Serbian local elections, and Radović was elected as mayor of Trstenik in the second round of voting. He served in office for a single term. Following the 2008 local elections, he became an advisor to his successor, Stevan Đaković of the Democratic Party (Demokratska stranka, DS). He was removed from this position in 2010 after representing the municipality in the media without authorization.

Serbia's electoral laws were again reformed in 2011, such that mandates were awarded to candidates on successful lists in numerical order. Radović contested the 2012 local elections at the head of his own Movement for the Municipality of Trstenik list, which narrowly missed crossing the electoral threshold.

In 2013, Radović joined the Serbian Progressive Party. He appeared in the forty-first position (out of forty-nine) on the party's list in Trstenik in the 2016 local elections. This appears to have been a largely nominal candidacy; election from this position was unlikely, and he was not elected when the list won nineteen seats.

== Electoral record ==
=== Municipal (Trstenik) ===
2004 Municipality of Trstenik local election Mayor of Trstenik (second round results)
Candidate	Party	Votes	%
Radovan Radović	Citizens' Group: Our Home Serbia	9,053	65.39
Goran Miodragović	Democratic Party	4,791	34.61
Total		13,844	100.00

=== National Assembly of Serbia ===
1990 Serbian parliamentary election: Trstenik I
Candidate	Party
Miroslav Č. Binić	Citizens' Group
Dušan Glišić	Citizens' Group
Nikola Jovanović	Serbian Renewal Movement
Petar Marinković	People's Radical Party
Ljubodrag Matić	Party of the Union of Serbian Peasants
Momčilo Milićević	Citizens' Group
Sonja J. Mirić	Democratic Party
Ljubodrag Obradović	Citizens' Group
Radovan Radović (***WINNER***)	Socialist Party of Serbia
Saša Rašković	Citizens' Group
Total
