= Nada Kolundžija =

Serbian politician (born 1952)

- Нада Колунџија
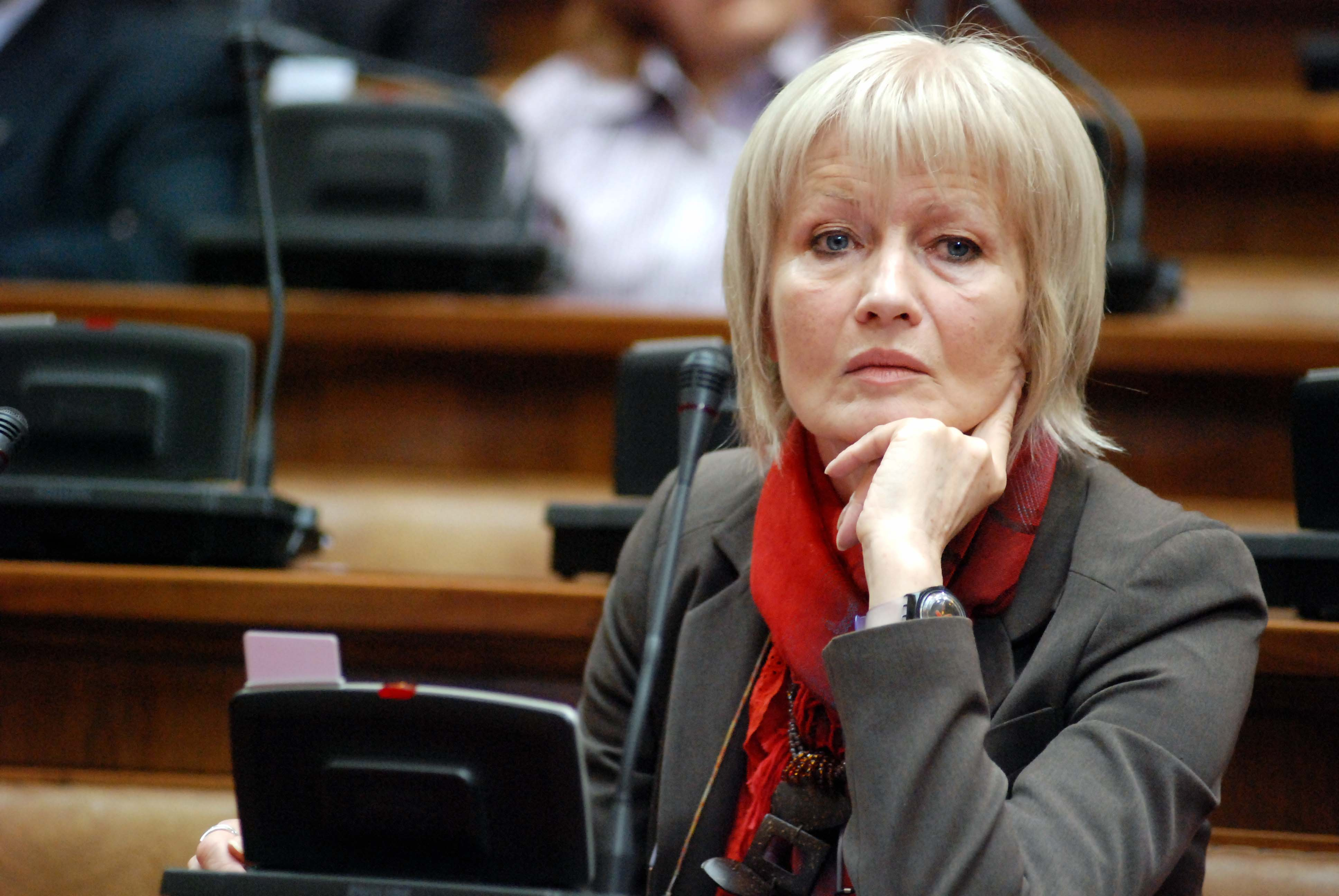

Member of the National Assembly of the Republic of Serbia
- In office 14 February 2007 – 16 April 2014
- In office 22 January 2001 – 27 January 2004

Member of the Assembly of Serbia and Montenegro
- In office 25 February 2003 – 12 February 2004

Personal details
- Born: 30 June 1952 (age 74) Subotica, AP Vojvodina, PR Serbia, FPR Yugoslavia
- Party: DA (1997–2004); DC (2004); DS (2004–2020); Demokrate Srbije (2021–22); SDS (2022–present)
- Education: University of Belgrade
- Occupation: Politician

Nada Kolundžija (Serbian Cyrillic: Нада Колунџија; born 30 June 1952) is a Serbian politician. She has served several terms in the Serbian parliament, initially with the Democratic Alternative (DA) and later with the Democratic Party (DS). She was also a member of the federal assembly of Serbia and Montenegro from 2003 to 2004.

Kolundžija was expelled from the DS in 2020 against the backdrop of a larger purge of the party's membership. In 2022, she became a member of the Social Democratic Party (SDS).

She is not to be confused with a concert pianist of the same name.

== Early life and career ==
Kolundžija was born in Subotica, Autonomous Province of Vojvodina, in what was then the People's Republic of Serbia in the Federal People's Republic of Yugoslavia. She graduated from the University of Belgrade Faculty of Political Sciences and was the secretary of Belgrade's Matica iseljenika centre from 1989 to 1998. She also worked in public relations and was an editor for the newspaper Blic.

== Politician ==
=== Democratic Alternative (1997–2004) ===
Kolundžija participated in the 1996–1997 protests in Serbia and became a founding member of the Democratic Alternative in July 1997. She was later chosen as a party vice-president.

The Democratic Alternative participated in the 2000 Yugoslavian parliamentary election as part of the Democratic Opposition of Serbia (DOS), a broad and ideologically diverse coalition of parties opposed to Slobodan Milošević's administration. Kolundžija appeared in the fourth and final position on the DOS's electoral list for the Belgrade division of Palilula. The DOS won three seats in the division, and she did not receive a mandate. (Note: For the 2000 Yugoslavian election, one-half of the assembly mandates were awarded to candidates on successful lists in numerical order, with the other half assigned to candidates at the discretion of the sponsoring parties or coalitions. Kolundžija could theoretically have been given the DOS's "optional" mandate for Palilula, but the alliance distributed the mandates in numerical order, and the seat instead went to third-ranked candidate Miroslav Aleksić of the Democratic Party of Serbia (DSS).)

The 2000 Yugoslavian parliamentary election was overshadowed by the concurrent presidential election, in which Slobodan Milošević fell from power after his defeat by DOS candidate Vojislav Koštunica. This was a watershed moment in Serbian and Yugoslavian politics. Kolundžija was subsequently appointed to the board of directors for Radio Television of Serbia.

The Serbian government fell soon after Milošević's defeat in the Yugoslavian vote, and a new Serbian parliamentary election called for December 2000. Prior to the vote, Serbia's electoral system was reformed so that the entire country became a single electoral unit and all mandates were assigned to candidates on successful lists at the discretion of the sponsoring parties or coalitions, irrespective of numerical order. Kolundžija was given the sixtieth position on the DOS's list, which won a landslide victory with 176 out of 250 mandates, and was included in her party's delegation when the assembly met in January 2001. She served as a supporter of Serbia's government and was president of the assembly's foreign affairs committee.

The Federal Republic of Yugoslavia was restructured as the State Union of Serbia and Montenegro in early 2003. A new unicameral parliament was established for the entity, and its first members were chosen by indirect election from the republican parliaments of Serbia and Montenegro. The Democratic Alternative had the right to appoint two members to the federal assembly, and its nominees were party leader Nebojša Čović and Kolundžija.

The DA contested the 2003 Serbian parliamentary election on its own, and Kolundžija appeared in the eighty-ninth position on its list, which did not cross the electoral threshold for assembly representation. Her terms in both the federal and republican parliaments ended in early 2004. She left the DA after a falling out with Čović and joined the Democratic Centre (DC), which in turn merged into the Democratic Party shortly thereafter.

=== Democratic Party (2004–20) ===
Kolundžija appeared in the fifty-eighth position on the Democratic Party's list for the Belgrade city assembly in the 2004 Serbian local elections. The list won a plurality victory with thirty-four seats; she did not take a seat in the assembly.

She later appeared in the 111th position on the DS's list in the 2007 parliamentary election and was given a mandate for a second assembly term when the list won sixty-four seats. After the election, the DS formed an unstable coalition government with G17 Plus and the rival Democratic Party of Serbia (DSS). Kolundžija became the leader of the DS's parliamentary group and served on the committee on foreign affairs and the committee on constitutional issues. She criticized the DSS's harsh rhetoric against the North Atlantic Treaty Organization (NATO), arguing that it was detrimental to Serbia's interests during international discussions on the status of Kosovo. Kolundžija was profiled by the news agency Beta in late 2007 and was described as "an extremely capable and determined politician."

The DS–DSS coalition fell apart in early 2008, and a new parliamentary election was held in May of that year. The DS contested the election at the head of the For a European Serbia (ZES) alliance; Kolundžija appeared in the eighty-eighth position on its list and received a mandate for a third term when it won a plurality victory with 102 seats. The overall results of the election were inconclusive, and ZES eventually formed a new government with the Socialist Party of Serbia (SPS). Kolundžija led the ZES group in the assembly and supported the choice of Mirko Cvetković as prime minister. She also continued to serve on the foreign affairs committee and the constitutional affairs committee and was a member of Serbia's delegation to the assembly of the Inter-Parliamentary Union and the parliamentary friendship groups with Russia and the United States of America.

In 2010, she played a prominent role in ensuring the Serbian assembly's approval of a declaration condemning the 1995 Srebrenica massacre. Later in the same year, she described Serbian president Boris Tadić's diplomatic visit to Vukovar as an important step in improving relations between Serbia and Croatia.

Serbia's electoral system was reformed in 2011, such that all parliamentary mandates were awarded to candidates on successful lists in numerical order. Kolundžija received the twelfth position on the DS's Choice for a Better Life list in the 2012 parliamentary election and was re-elected when the list won sixty-seven mandates. The Serbian Progressive Party (SNS) won a narrow plurality victory in the election and afterward formed a new administration with the SPS. The DS moved to opposition and, over the next two years, became increasingly divided into rival factions. In her fourth national assembly term, Kolundžija was once again a member of the foreign affairs committee, a deputy member of the committee on culture and information, again a member of Serbia's delegation to the Inter-Parliamentary Union assembly, and a member of the friendship groups with the United Kingdom and the United States.

Kolundžija received the twenty-fourth position on the DS's list in the 2014 parliamentary election. With the party weakened by division, the list won only nineteen mandates, and she was not re-elected. She received the thirtieth position in the 2016 election and was again not returned when the list won only sixteen seats.

She received the lead position on the DS's list for the New Belgrade municipal assembly in the 2016 Serbian local elections, which were held concurrently with the parliamentary vote, and was elected when the list won three mandates. She resigned her seat in the local assembly on 20 July 2016.

Kolundžija was elected a DS vice-president in September 2016. In September 2020, she was one of several prominent figures expelled from the party.

=== Social Democratic Party (2022–present) ===
Kolundžija joined the newly formed Democrats of Serbia (Demokrate Srbije) in February 2021. The party merged into the Social Democratic Party one year later, and Kolundžija was elected as a SDS vice-president.

The SDS contested the 2022 Serbian parliamentary election and the concurrent 2022 Belgrade city assembly election in an alliance with the New Party (NOVA). Kolundžija received the fifth position on the alliance's list in the parliamentary vote and the twentieth position in the city vote. The alliance did not cross the electoral threshold in either election.

For the 2023 parliamentary election and the 2023 Belgrade city assembly election, the SDS ran in an alliance with the right-wing Enough Is Enough (DJB) party. Kolundžija appeared in the twenty-first position in the parliamentary contest and the 105th position in the city vote. As in 2022, the list did not cross the threshold at either level.
