= Tihomir Marjanović =

Serbian academic and politician

Tihomir Marjanović (Serbian Cyrillic: Тихомир Марјановић; born 23 August 1944) is a Serbian retired academic and politician. He was the mayor of Požega from 1996 to 2000 and served in the Serbian parliament from 1997 to 2001. At different times in his career, Marjanović was a member of the Serbian Renewal Movement (SPO), the Democratic Party of Serbia (DSS), and the Party of United Pensioners of Serbia (PUPS), as well as serving as an independent representative at the end of his career.

== Early life and career ==
Marjanović was born in the village of Radovci near Požega, in what was then German-occupied territory in the closing period of the Axis occupation of Serbia. He was raised in the community, which was then part of the People's Republic of Serbia in the Federal People's Republic of Yugoslavia, after the end of World War II. Marjanović graduated from high school in nearby Užice, received a mathematics degree from the Higher Pedagogical School in Belgrade (Užice department) in 1966, and earned a bachelor's degree in mathematics from the University of Novi Sad in 1969. He was a math teacher at the Požega high school from 1970 to 1986 and director of the community's education centre from 1986 to 1990.

Marjanović received a master's degree from the University of Belgrade Faculty of Electrical Engineering in 1990 and taught at the "Sveti Sava" high school in Požega for the next two years. He then worked at the technical college in Čačak from 1992 to 1996, after which time he began working at the Faculty of Teacher Education in Užice, a division of the University of Kragujevac. In 2005, he received a PhD from the Department of Philosophy at the University of East Sarajevo and attained the title of Doctor of Mathematical Sciences.

== Politician ==
=== Serbian Renewal Movement ===
During the 1990s, Serbian political life was dominated by the authoritarian rule of Slobodan Milošević, leader of the Socialist Party of Serbia (SPS). The Serbian Renewal Movement contested the 1992 Serbian parliamentary election as part of an opposition alliance called the Democratic Movement of Serbia (DEPOS). Marjanović appeared in the fifteenth position of the DEPOS electoral list for Užice; the list won six mandates, and he was not included in his party's assembly delegation. (From 1992 to 2000, Serbia had a "one-third/two-thirds" rule for the distribution of mandates in parliamentary elections (i.e., one-third of mandates were assigned to candidates on successful lists in numerical order, with the remaining two-thirds distributed to other candidates at the discretion of the sponsoring parties or coalitions). Marjanović could have been given a mandate despite his list position, but he was not.)

In 1996, the SPO joined a new opposition coalition called Zajedno (English: Together). The coalition unexpectedly won several major cities in the 1996 Serbian local elections; in Požega, it won a narrow majority victory with twenty-seven out of fifty-two seats. Marjanović was elected as a Zajedno candidate; when the assembly convened, he was chosen as its president, a position that was then equivalent to mayor, while Milka Marinković of the Democratic Party (DS) became vice-president. Although the Zajedno coalition broke apart at the republic level in mid-1997, it remained intact in Požega for the full term that followed.

Marjanović appeared in the second position on the SPO's list for a smaller, redistributed Užice division in the 1997 Serbian parliamentary election and was awarded a mandate in the national assembly when the list won two seats. The Socialist Party's alliance won the electoral overall, and the SPS formed a coalition government with the Yugoslav Left (JUL) and the far-right Serbian Radical Party (SRS). The SPO served in opposition. (Note: In early 1999, the SPO briefly joined a coalition government led by the Socialist Party in the Federal Republic of Yugoslavia, which comprised the republics of Serbia and Montenegro. It did not join the government at the republic level, although its opposition to the SPS was obviously more muted in this period.)

In March 2000, Serbian government forces attempted to shut down an independent television station in Požega, leading to a riot. Marjanović defended the station and refuted government claims of opposition violence. The matter was reported in the international media.

Several anti-Milošević parties came together to form the Democratic Opposition of Serbia (DOS) in 2000. DOS candidate Vojislav Koštunica defeated Milošević in the that year's Yugoslavian presidential election, and Milošević fell from power on 5 October 2000. The SPO was not part of the DOS alliance; in Požega, however, the DOS and SPO worked together for the 2000 Serbian local elections, which took place concurrently with the Yugoslavian vote, and won forty out of fifty-two seats. Marjanović was re-elected to the assembly, presumably as a DOS–SPO candidate, although he did not continue in the role of mayor. He was not a candidate in the 2000 Serbian parliamentary election, which was held in December of that year, and his parliamentary term ended when the new assembly convened in January 2001.

=== Democratic Party of Serbia ===
By 2003, Marjanović had left the SPO and joined the Democratic Party of Serbia. In September of that year, he said that the local administration was not working as the DOS promised when it came to power. He appeared in the 173rd position on the DSS's list in the 2003 Serbian parliamentary election and was not assigned a mandate when the list won fifty-three seats. (By this time, Serbia's electoral laws had been reformed such that the entire country was a single at-large division and all mandates were assigned to candidates on successful lists at the discretion of the sponsoring parties or coalitions. Marjanović's list position had no specific bearing on his chances of election.)

The DSS won six seats in Požega in the 2004 Serbian local elections and afterward formed a coalition government with the Radicals, the Socialists, the Strength of Serbia Movement (PSS), and G17 Plus. Marjanović was one of the DSS candidates elected and afterward served again as assembly president, a position that was now separated from the office of mayor. He did not serve in the assembly that was elected in 2008.

=== Party of United Pensioners of Serbia/Independent ===
Serbia's electoral laws were reformed again in 2011, such that all mandates in elections held under proportional representation were assigned to candidates on successful lists in numerical order. Marjanović returned to active political life in the 2016 Serbian local elections as a member of the PUPS, which contested the election in Požega on the list of the Serbian Progressive Party (SNS). He received the seventh position the SNS's list and was re-elected when the list won twenty-five seats.

In early 2018, Požega's SNS-led government made the very controversial decision to purchase an illegal building co-owned by the spouse of the assembly president. Marjanović subsequently announced in the assembly that he could no longer support the local administration, saying, "Shame on you. You have lost my support." He served afterward as an independent and did not seek re-election in 2020.
