= Dragomir Pavlović (Serbian politician, born 1958) =

Serbian engineer and politician

Dragomir Pavlović (Serbian Cyrillic: Драгомир Павловић; born 7 April 1958) is a Serbian engineer and former politician. He served in the National Assembly of Serbia from 1997 to 2001 and was a delegate in the City Assembly of Belgrade for two terms. Originally a member of the far-right Serbian Radical Party (SRS), Pavlović later joined the breakaway Serbian Progressive Party (SNS).

== Private career ==
Pavlović is a civil engineer.

== Politician ==
Pavlović was elected to the City Assembly of Belgrade in the 1996 Serbian local elections for New Belgrade's eleventh division. The Zajedno alliance won a majority government in the city, and Pavlović initially served in opposition. In mid-1997, the Serbian Renewal Movement left Zajedno and governed Belgrade with unofficial support from the Socialist Party of Serbia (SPS) and the Radicals.

=== Parliamentarian ===
Pavlović was given the fifth position on the Radical Party's electoral list for the New Belgrade division in the 1997 Serbian parliamentary election and was elected when the list won five mandates. (From 1992 to 2000, Serbia's electoral law stipulated that one-third of parliamentary mandates would be assigned to candidates on successful lists in numerical order, while the remaining two-thirds would be distributed amongst other candidates at the discretion of sponsoring parties or coalitions. Pavlović was not automatically elected by virtue of his list position.) The Socialist Party's alliance won the election but fell short of a majority, and in March 1998 the Socialists formed a new coalition government with the Radical Party and the Yugoslav Left (JUL). Pavlović served as a supporter of the administration.

In February 2000, following the Kosovo War and the NATO bombing of Yugoslavia, Pavlović was placed on a travel ban to European Union countries.

Serbian political life in the 1990s was dominated by the authoritarian rule of SPS leader Slobodan Milošević, who was defeated by Vojislav Koštunica of the Democratic Opposition of Serbia (DOS) in the 2000 Yugoslavian presidential election and fell from power in the aftermath of the vote. The DOS won a landslide majority victory in Belgrade in the 2000 Serbian local elections, which were held concurrently with the Yugoslavian vote, and Pavlović was defeated in his bid for re-election to the Belgrade city assembly. At the same time, he was defeated in a bid for election to the New Belgrade municipal assembly.

Serbia's government fell after Milošević's defeat in the Yugoslavian election, and the Radicals moved into opposition in the Serbian parliament in October 2000. A new Serbian parliamentary election was held in December 2000; prior to the vote, Serbia's electoral laws were changed such that the entire country became a single electoral division and all mandates were awarded to candidates on successful lists at the discretion of the sponsoring parties, irrespective of numerical order. Pavlović appeared in the 197th position on the Radical Party's list; the Radicals won twenty-three seats, and he did not receive a new mandate. His term ended when the new assembly convened in early 2001.

=== Since 2001 ===
Pavlović sought re-election to the Belgrade city assembly in a 2001 by-election for New Belgrade's fifth division. He was defeated.

He appeared in the 113th position on the Radical Party's list in the 2003 Serbian parliamentary election. The Radicals won eighty-two seats in this election, emerging as the largest party in the assembly but falling well short of a majority and ultimately serving in opposition. Pavlović was not assigned a mandate.

The Radical Party experienced a serious split in late 2008, with several members joining the more moderate Serbian Progressive Party (SNS). Pavlović sided with the Progressives.

He was given the forty-third position on the SNS list for Belgrade in the 2012 local elections. (By this time, local elections in Serbia took place under proportional representation and all mandates were awarded to candidates on successful lists in numerical order.) The list won thirty-seven seats, and he was not initially elected. He received a seat in the assembly on 4 December 2012, following the resignation of Dijana Hrkalović. Dragan Đilas was Belgrade's mayor during this time, and the Progressives served in opposition.

The Serbian government established a provisional government in Belgrade on 20 November 2013, after Đilas's administration was defeated in a confidence vote, and all sitting members of the assembly lost their mandates at this time. Pavlović was not a candidate in the 2014 Belgrade City Assembly election.

== Electoral record ==
=== Local (City of Belgrade) ===
23 September 2001 Belgrade city by-election: New Belgrade Division 5
Candidate	Party
Miroslav Ivković	People's Party of Justice
Danka Krivokuća	Serbian Renewal Movement
Vera Madžar	Party of Serbian Progress
Dragomir Pavlović	Serbian Radical Party
Ljiljana Perović (***WINNER***)	Democratic Opposition of Serbia (affiliation: Democratic Party)
Dejan Stjepanović	Socialist Party of Serbia
Total

2000 Belgrade city election: New Belgrade Division 11
Candidate	Party
Zoran Aćić	Yugoslav Communists
Radomir Živković	Serbian Renewal Movement
Spomenka Jović	Socialist Party of Serbia–Yugoslav Left–Slobodan Milošević
Branko Korenić	Radical Party of Serbia
Vladimir Kravčuk (***WINNER***)	Democratic Opposition of Serbia–Dr. Vojislav Koštunica (affiliation: Civic Alliance of Serbia)
Đuro Malvašić	United Pensioners Party
Dragomir Pavlović	Serbian Radical Party
Borivoj Stamenić	Workers' Party of Yugoslavia
Total

1996 Belgrade city election: New Belgrade Division 11
Candidate	Party
Dragomir Pavlović (***WINNER***)	Serbian Radical Party
other candidates	
Total

=== Local (Municipality of New Belgrade) ===
2000 New Belgrade municipal election: New Belgrade Division 56
Candidate	Party
Dragomir Pavlović (***DEFEATED***)	Serbian Radical Party
other candidates	
Total
