= Zoran Zečević =

Serbian politician

- Зоран Зечевић

Member of the National Assembly of the Republic of Serbia
- In office 1 August 2022 – 6 February 2024

Personal details
- Born: 12 October 1956 (age 69) Aranđelovac, PR Serbia, FPR Yugoslavia
- Party: SSJ (until 2007); SRS (2007-c. 2008); SDS (2012); SSJ (2013-c. 2015); SSZ (c. 2016–present)

Zoran Zečević (Serbian Cyrillic: Зоран Зечевић; born 12 October 1956) is a Serbian politician. He served in the Serbian parliament from 2022 to 2024 as a member of the far-right Serbian Party Oathkeepers (SSZ) and is now a member of the Aranđelovac municipal assembly. He was arrested in February 2025 on the grounds of attacking representatives of Serbia's labour ministry.

== Private career ==
Zečević was born in Aranđelovac, in what was then the People's Republic of Serbia in the Federal People's Republic of Yugoslavia. He is a retired surgeon. In September 2022, it was reported that he was the co-owner of an illegal retirement home in Aranđelovac, which was still operating despite a prior ban.

== Politician ==
Zečević has a long history of involvement in Serbian far-right politics. He was a member of the presidency of the Party of Serbian Unity (SSJ) in the early 2000s. The party contested the 2003 Serbian parliamentary election as part of the For National Unity coalition; Zečević appeared in the seventy-seventh position on its electoral list, which did not cross the electoral threshold for assembly representation. He was later a prominent organizer for SSJ leader Borislav Pelević's campaign in the 2004 Serbian presidential election.

Pelević merged the SSJ into the Serbian Radical Party (SRS) in 2007, and Zečević appeared in the thirty-ninth position on the Radical Party's list in the 2008 Serbian parliamentary election. The list won seventy-eight seats, and he was not included in the party's assembly delegation. (From 2000 to 2011, assembly mandates were awarded to sponsoring parties or coalitions rather than to individual candidates, and it was common practice for the mandates to be assigned out of numerical order. Zečević was not automatically elected by virtue of his list position.)

Pelević left the SRS in late 2008 to join the more moderate Serbian Progressive Party (SNS). Zečević also left the Radicals at around the same time, although he did not join the Progressives. He led an independent list called "Aranđelovac in Belgrade–Movement for the Development of Serbia" for the 2010 local election in Aranđelovac. The list did not cross the electoral threshold.

Serbia's electoral system was reformed in 2011, such that all mandates were awarded in numerical order to candidates on successful lists. Somewhat improbably, Zečević appeared in the fifty-eighth position on the list of the Social Democratic Alliance (Socijaldemokratski savez, SDS), a short-lived left-wing grouping, in the 2012 parliamentary election. This list, too, did not cross the electoral threshold.

Boris Pelević left the SNS in 2013 and founded the Council of Serbian Unity (SSJ) as a successor to the Party of Serbian Unity. Zečević reunited with Pelević at this time and became a party vice-president. The new SSJ contested the 2014 parliamentary election at the head of an alliance called the Patriotic Front (which also included the Oathkeepers), and Zečević appeared in the second position on its list. Once again, the list did not cross the threshold. In 2015, Zečević was the SSJ's representative at a protest event in northern Kosovska Mitrovica commemorating the anniversary of the NATO bombing of Yugoslavia.

The SSJ became inactive after 2015, and Zečević subsequently became a member of the Oathkeepers. He appeared in the fifth position on the SSZ's list in the 2016 parliamentary election and the lead position on its list in the 2020 parliamentary election. In both cases, the list fell below the threshold.

In 2021, he led a group of SSZ members in disrupting a literary reading by Serbian author Svetislav Basara, on the grounds that Basara had written disparagingly about Desanka Maksimović, an important figure in Serbian literary history.

=== Parliamentarian ===
Zečević received the second position on the SSZ's list in the 2022 Serbian parliamentary election, behind its main spokesperson Milica Đurđević Stamenkovski, and was elected when the list won ten seats. The SNS and its allies won the election, and the SSZ served in opposition for the term that followed. Zečević also appeared in the seventh position on the SSZ's list in Aranđelovac in the concurrent 2022 local elections and was not initially elected when the list won five seats.

During his assembly term, Zečević was a member of the economy committee (Note: Formally known as the Committee on the Economy, Regional Development, Trade, Tourism, and Energy.) and the health and family committee, a deputy member of the committee on the rights of the child, and a member of the parliamentary friendship groups with Bolivia and Greece.

The SSZ contested the 2023 parliamentary election in an alliance with Dveri, and Zečević received the ninth position on their combined list. The list did not cross the electoral threshold, and his parliamentary term ended when the new assembly convened in early 2024.

=== Since 2024 ===
Zečević received a mandate for the Aranđelovac municipal assembly on 22 July 2024 as the replacement for another party delegate.

== Arrest ==
Zečević and his son Ognjen were arrested in February 2025 on the charge that they had attacked representatives of Serbia's labour ministry who were inspecting their family-owned retirement home. Media coverage of their arrests drew attention to the fact that Zečević and his sons had been running illegal retirement homes in Aranđelovac over a period of several years.
