= Marija Jevđić =

Serbian politician

- Марија Јевђић

Member of the National Assembly of the Republic of Serbia
- Incumbent
- Assumed office 16 April 2014

Deputy Speaker of the National Assembly of the Republic of Serbia
- In office 22 October 2020 – 1 August 2022

Personal details
- Born: 1981 (age 44–45)
- Party: DSP (2000); JS

Marija Jevđić (Serbian Cyrillic: Марија Јевђић; born 16 January 1981), formerly known as Marija Ristović, is a Serbian athlete and politician. She has served in the Serbian national assembly since 2014 as a member of United Serbia (JS).

== Early life and private career ==
Jevđić was born in Kraljevo, in what was then the Socialist Republic of Serbia in the Socialist Federal Republic of Yugoslavia. She is a graduate of the Business School of Vocational Studies in Belgrade.

Before entering political life, Jevđić was a prominent figure in women's kickboxing. She won championships at the Yugoslavian, Mediterranean, and European levels and was at one time a vice-champion at the world level. She was named best sportswoman of Kraljevo on five occasions.

== Politician ==
Jevđić, while still a student, appeared in the one hundredth position on the electoral list of Milorad Vučelić's Democratic Socialist Party (DSP) in the 2000 Serbian parliamentary election. The list did not cross the electoral threshold for assembly representation. She later joined United Serbia.

United Serbia has contested every Serbian parliamentary election since 2008 as part of an alliance led by the Socialist Party of Serbia (SPS). The two parties have also cooperated at the local level in several cities, including Kraljevo.

=== Local politics ===
Jevđić appeared in the third position on the Socialist Party's list for Kraljevo in the 2012 Serbian local elections and was elected when the list won eleven mandates. The Serbian Progressive Party (SNS) and its allies won the election and afterward formed a coalition government that included the Socialists. Jevđić served in the city assembly as a supporter of the administration.

She again received the third position on the SPS list in the 2016 local elections and was re-elected when the list again won eleven seats. She was promoted to the second position for the 2020 local elections and was elected for a third term when the list won twelve seats.

In the early 2023 local election in Kraljevo, Jevđić once again received the second position on the SPS list and was re-elected when it won seven seats.

=== Parliamentarian ===
Jevđić appeared in the fifty-fourth position on the Socialist Party's list in the 2012 Serbian parliamentary election and was not elected when the list won forty-four seats.

She was promoted to the thirty-fifth position for the 2014 parliamentary election. The list again won forty-four seats, and on this occasion she was elected. In her first parliamentary term, she was a member of the committee on the diaspora and Serbs in the region; a deputy member of the committee on Kosovo-Metohija, the health and family committee, and the committee on the rights of the child; and a member of the parliamentary friendship groups with Belgium, Denmark, France, Italy, Portugal, and Turkey.

Jevđić received the seventeenth position on the SPS's list in the 2016 parliamentary election and was re-elected when the list won twenty-nine seats. In the term that followed, she was a member of the labour committee (Note: Formally known as the Committee on Labour, Social Issues, Social Inclusion, and Poverty Reduction.) and the committee on the rights of the child, a deputy member of the economy committee (Note: Formally known as the Committee on the Economy, Regional Development, Trade, Tourism, and Energy.) and the education committee, (Note: Formally known as the Committee on the Education, Science, Technological Development, and the Information Society.) and a member of the parliamentary friendship groups with Austria, Belgium, Bosnia and Herzegovina, Bulgaria, China, Denmark, France, Germany, Greece, Italy, Mexico, Russia, Tunisia, Turkey, and the United States of America.

Jevđić was again given the seventeenth position on the SPS's list in the 2020 parliamentary election and was elected to a third term when the list won thirty-two seats. She served afterward as deputy chair of the committee on constitutional and legislative issues, a member of the European integration committee and the committee on the rights of the child, a deputy member of the health and family committee, a member of the European Union–Serbia stabilization and association committee, and a member of the parliamentary friendship groups with Austria, Bulgaria, China, Egypt, France, Germany, Italy, the Netherlands, North Korea, Portugal, Russia, Sweden, Turkey, Ukraine, and the United States of America. She was chosen as a deputy speaker of the assembly on 22 October 2020 and served for the remainder of the term.

She was promoted to the tenth position on the SPS's list in the 2022 parliamentary election and was again re-elected when the list won thirty-one seats. In her fourth term, she was a member of the health and family committee and the defence and internal affairs committee; a deputy member of the finance committee, (Note: Formally known as the Committee on Finance, State Budget, and Control of Public Spending) the European integration committee, and the committee on the rights of the child; a member of Serbia's delegation to the Parliamentary Assembly of the Mediterranean; the leader of Serbia's parliamentary friendship group with Brazil; and a member of the friendship groups with Austria, Belarus, Bulgaria, China, Egypt, France, Germany, Greece, Italy, the Netherlands, North Korea, Palestine, Portugal, Russia, Sweden, Turkey, Ukraine, and the United States of America.

Jevđić again received the tenth position on the SPS's list in the 2023 parliamentary election and was elected to a fifth term even as the list fell to eighteen seats overall. She is now a member of the defence and internal affairs committee, a deputy member of the economy committee and the committee on the rights of the child, a member of Serbia's delegation to the parliamentary assembly of the Black Sea Economic Cooperation (PABSEC), and a member of the parliamentary friendship groups with Austria, the Benelux countries, Brazil, Bulgaria, China, Egypt, France, Germany, Greece, Italy and the Holy See, Portugal, Russia, South Korea, Sweden, Ukraine, and, the United States of America. In September 2024, she spoke in favour of introducing mandatory military service.

United Serbia has either participated in or supported Serbia's coalition government led by the Serbian Progressive Party throughout Jevđić's time in parliament.
