= List of members of the National Assembly of Serbia, 2000–2003 =

== MNAs by party ==
Name	Abbr.	Leader	Ideology	Political position	MPs	Gov′t
Democratic Party; Демократска странка Demokratska stranka	DS	Zoran Đinđić	Social liberalism Pro-Europeanism	Centre	45 / 250	G
Democratic Party of Serbia; Демократска странка Србије; Demokratska stranka Srbije	DSS	Vojislav Koštunica	National conservatism Christian democracy	Centre-right	45 / 250	O (Note: Government 2000-2001, opposition 2001-2004)
Socialist Party of Serbia; Социјалистичка партија Србије; Socijalistička partija Srbije	SPS	Slobodan Milošević	Democratic socialism Left-wing populism	Left-wing	37 / 250	O
Serbian Radical Party; Српска радикална странка Srpska radikalna stranka	SRS	Vojislav Šešelj	Ultranationalism; Serbian irredentism	Far-right	23 / 250	O
Party of Serbian Unity; Странка српског јединства Stranka srpskog jedinstva	SSJ	Borislav Pelević	Serbian nationalism Serbian irredentism	Far-right	14 / 250	O
Civic Alliance of Serbia; Грађански савез Србије; Građanski savez Srbije	GSS	Goran Svilanović	Liberalism; Atlanticism	Centre	9 / 250	G
Social Democracy; Социјалдемократија; Socijaldemokratija	SD	Vuk Obradović	Social democracy Atlanticism	Centre-left	9 / 250	G
New Democracy; Нова демократија Nova demokratija	ND	Dušan Mihajlović	Liberalism; Social democracy	Centre to centre-left	9 / 250	G
New Serbia; Нова Србија; Nova Srbija	NS	Velimir Ilić	Right-wing populism Monarchism	Right-wing	8 / 250	S
Christian Democratic Party of Serbia; Демохришћанска странка Србије; Demohrišćanska stranka Srbije	DHSS	Vladan Batić	Christian democracy Atlanticism	Centre-right	8 / 250	G
League of Social Democrats of Vojvodina; Лига социјалдемократа Војводине; Liga socijaldemokrata Vojvodine	LSV	Nenad Čanak	Social democracy Regionalism	Centre-left	6 / 250	G
Democratic Alternative (Serbia); Демократска Алтернатива; Demokratska Alternativa	DA	Nebojša Čović	Social democracy Democratic socialism	Centre-left	6 / 250	G
Alliance of Vojvodina Hungarians; Савез војвођанских Мађара; Savez vojvođanskih Mađara	SVM	József Kasza	Hungarian minority politics Conservatism	Centre-right	6 / 250	G
Movement for Democratic Serbia; Покрет за демократску Србију; Pokret za demokratsku Srbiju	PDS	Momčilo Perišić	Serbian nationalism Conservatism	Right-wing	5 / 250	S
Vojvodina Coalition; Коалиција Војводина; Koalicija Vojvodina	KV	Dragan Veselinov	Autonomism; Regionalism	Centre to centre-left	4 / 250	G
Reformists of Vojvodina; Реформисти Војводине; Reformisti Vojvodine	RF	Miodrag Isakov	Social democracy Regionalism	Centre-left	4 / 250	G
Social Democratic Union; Социјалдемократска унија Socijaldemokratska unija	SDU	Žarko Korać	Social democracy Pro-Europeanism	Centre-left	4 / 250	G
Party of Democratic Action of Sandžak; Странка демократске акције Санџака; Stranka demokratske akcije Sandžaka	SDA S	Sulejman Ugljanin	Bosniak minority politics Separatism	Right-wing	2 / 250	G
Together for Šumadija; Заједно за Шумадију; Zajedno za Šumadiju	ZZŠ	Slavko Spasić	Liberal conservatism Regionalism	Centre-right	2 / 250	S
