= Peasants Party of Serbia =

Peasants Party of Serbia Сељачка странка Србије Seljačka stranka Srbije
- President: Živko Selaković
- Founder: Milomir Babić
- Founded: October 26, 1990
- Dissolved: December 30, 2009
- Merged into: Social Democratic Party of Serbia
- Headquarters: Braće Vučković 60, Belgrade
- Ideology: Agrarianism; Monarchism

The Peasants Party of Serbia (Serbian: Сељачка странка Србије or Seljačka stranka Srbije) was a political party in Serbia.

== History ==
It was founded on 26 October 1990 in Kragujevac by Milomir Babić at which point it was called the Party of the Serbian Peasants Union. In the 1990 legislative election, it won 1,1% and 2 seats in two districts. The elected MPs were Milomir Babić in Desimirovac and Ljubomir Dodić in Milutovac. In the 1992 legislative election it won 2,7% and 3 seats.

During 1993 the PPS was part of the DEPOS. However, it decided to run in the 1993 election alone in November 1993.

In 1996 Živko Selaković was elected party president. In the 1997 election it was part of an alliance around the Democratic Alternative headed by Nebojša Čović and won no seats.

Two splinter groups led by Radosav Drezgić from Dublje and Ljubomir Dodić from Milutovac ran in the 1997 election independently from Selaković's PPS. Drezgić's group won 0.05% running only in Šabac independently, and Dodić's group won 0.04% running only in Kruševac in coalition with Paroški's People's Party. Neither won any seats.

In the 2000 election the PPS was part of the Party of Serbian Unity list and won one seat, awarded to Živko Selaković.

On 23 January 2003 it formed a new parliamentary group "Serbia" with the United Pensioners' Party and three former members of New Serbia. One day later, the UPP withdrew from the parliamentary group. It was later joined by the People's Peasant Party, which was expelled from the Vojvodina Coalition. On 9 February 2003 a bomb was set outside Selaković's family home in Žarkovo. Allegedly, he had been receiving threats from Party of Serbian Unity leaders Borislav Pelević and Dragan Marković Palma. Pelević denied threatening Selaković and condemned the attack.

On 8 October 2003, after a meeting with delegates from the Democratic Party headed by Gordana Čomić, Selaković stated that the PPS supported the government in "achieving its goals regarding reform".

In the 2003 election, Živko Selaković ran on the Labour Party of Serbia list, led by the then Minister of Labour Dragan Milovanović. The list won 0,1% and no seats. Another faction of the party led by Milomir Babić, under the name Peasants Party (Serbian: Сељачка странка or Seljačka stranka), ran on the Independent Serbia list, which won 1.2% and no seats.

On 30 December 2009 the PPS merged into the Social Democratic Party of Serbia and ceased to exist.

== Electoral results ==
=== Parliamentary elections ===
Election	Votes	%	Seats	+/–	Coalitions	Government
1990	52,663	1.05%	2 / 250	▲2		opposition
1992	128,240	2.71%	3 / 250	▲1		opposition
1993	65,623	1.53%	0 / 250	▼3		non-parliamentary
1997	60,855	1.23%	0 / 250	Steady	DA-PPS	non-parliamentary
2000	200,052	5.33%	1 / 250	▲1	SSJ-PSP-UPS	opposition (2000–2003) gov't support (Oct 2003–2004)
2003	4,666	0.12%	0 / 250	▼1	LPS	non-parliamentary
