= Mehmed Slezović =

Serbian painter and politician

Mehmed Slezović (Serbian Cyrillic: Мехмед Слезовић; born 19 August 1960) is a Serbian painter, academic, and former politician. A member of the country's Bosniak community, he served in the National Assembly of Serbia and the Assembly of Serbia and Montenegro from 2004 to 2006 as a member of G17 Plus.

== Early life and career ==
Slezović was born in Novi Pazar, in the Sandžak region of what was then the People's Republic of Serbia in the Federal People's Republic of Yugoslavia. He graduated from the University of Belgrade Faculty of Fine Arts in 1985, working under Radenko Mišević, and earned his Ph.D. in 2008 with the thesis, "Artistic drawing in contemporary practice and theory."

He lived in Istanbul during the Yugoslav Wars of the 1990s, later crediting the experience with expanding his knowledge of relations in the Balkans and providing an understanding of "a certain sensibility and inclination from Europe as a legacy."

== Painter ==
Slezović was a freelance painter from 1990 to 2007. He was part of the initiative committee that led to the establishment of the International University of Novi Pazar and has worked in its art department since 2008. Between 1985 and 2018, his paintings were exhibited independently seventy times and in collective exhibitions three hundred times, in Serbia and internationally. His works are featured in museum collections in Tokyo, Kraków, Cremona, and Catania.

He has said that, as an undergraduate, he was drawn to the works of the Old Masters, especially Rembrandt, less from a standpoint of veneration than from finding in their work "something that deeply touches some similarity of being."

== Politics ==
Slezović became the leader of the Liberal Bosniak Organization (Liberalna Bošnjačka Organizacija, LBO) in 1990. The party was initially a regional branch of the Muslim Bosniak Organisation, although it became autonomous with the breakup of Yugoslavia. Rejecting identification around religious or ethnic lines, it promoted a multi-ethnic Bosniak identity and sought autonomy for the Sandžak while rejecting independence or any changes to existing republican borders. The LBO co-operated to some degree with the Party of Democratic Action of Sandžak (Stranka demokratske akcije Sandžaka, SDA) and had members on the Muslim National Council of Sandžak and the Novi Pazar city assembly.

During the Yugoslav Wars, Slezović led the Sandžak Intellectual Circle, a group that opposed war politics and xenophobia.

=== Parliamentarian ===
Slezović appeared in the 205th position on G17 Plus's electoral list in the 2003 Serbian parliamentary election. The list won thirty-four seats, and he was chosen as part of his party's delegation when the national assembly convened in January 2004. (From 2000 to 2011, Serbian parliamentary mandates were awarded to candidates on successful lists at the discretion of the sponsoring parties or coalitions, and it was common practice for the mandates to be assigned out of numerical order. Slezović's position on the list – which was in any case mostly alphabetical – had no formal bearing on whether received a mandate.)

His term in the national assembly was brief. By virtue of its performance in the 2003 Serbian election, G17 Plus had the right to appoint twelve members of the federal assembly of Serbia and Montenegro. Slezović was chosen as part of the party's delegation and so resigned from the Serbian parliament. He served until 2006; the assembly ceased to exist when Montenegro declared independence.

Serbia introduced the direct election of mayors for the 2004 Serbian local elections. Slezović ran as G17 Plus's candidate in Novi Pazar and fared poorly, finishing in ninth place. He also appeared in the lead position on G17 Plus's list; the list did not win any mandates.

=== Political commentary ===
Slezović has written several opinion pieces for Danas, often on issues of identity in relation to Serbian and Bosnian history and contemporary politics. In March 2020, he wrote a eulogy for Muhamed Filipović. In a piece written two years later, he described Muslim identity in Bosnia and Herzegovina as "a fruit of European culture" and rejected a default association between Bosniak identity and Islam.

== Electoral record ==
=== Local (Novi Pazar) ===
2004 Municipality of Novi Pazar local election: Mayor of Novi Pazar
Candidate	Party	First round		Second round	
Candidate	Party	Votes	%	Votes	%
Sulejman Ugljanin	Coalition: List for Sandžak Dr. Sulejman Ugljanin (Affiliation: Party of Democratic Action of Sandžak)	14,147	42.87	18,863	52.33
Sait Kačapor	SDP–Rasim Ljajić	10,624	32.19	17,180	47.67
Fevzija Murić	Party for Sandžak Dr. Fevzija Murić	2,373	7.19		
Milan Veselinović	Serbian Radical Party–Tomislav Nikolić	2,127	6.45		
Milutin Cvetić	Serbian Democratic Alliance – Coalition: DSS, Citizens' Group, SPS, SPO, NS, DA, SSJ, DHSS	1,618	4.90		
Tarik Imamović Dip. Ing. El. Teh.	Sandžak Alternative	702	2.13		
Ruždija Agušević	Citizens' Group	518	1.57		
Dragić Pavlović	Strength of Serbia Movement	353	1.07		
Mehmed Slezović	G17 Plus	289	0.88		
Zehnija Bulić	Sandžak Democratic Union	250	0.76		
Total		33,001	100.00	36,043	100.00
