= Serbian presidential election, 2002 =

Two presidential elections were held in Serbia in 2002:

- Serbian presidential election, September–October 2002
- Serbian presidential election, December 2002
