= List of members of the National Assembly of Serbia, 1997–2000 =

The following is a list of members of the National Assembly of Serbia by party for the parliamentary term from 1997 to 2000. The assembly consisted of 250 seats. Parties represented included the Socialist Party of Serbia (SPS), the Serbian Radical Party (SRS), the Serbian Renewal Movement (SPO), the Yugoslav Left (JUL), and several smaller parties. The SPS and SRS were the largest parties, each holding over 80 seats.

== MPs by party ==
Name	Abbr.	Leader	Ideology	Political position	MPs	Gov't
Socialist Party of Serbia; Социјалистичка партија Србије; Socijalistička partija Srbije	SPS	Slobodan Milošević	Communism; Yugoslavism	Left-wing	85 / 250	G
Serbian Radical Party; Српска радикална странка Srpska radikalna stranka	SRS	Vojislav Šešelj	Ultranationalism; Serbian irredentism	Far-right	82 / 250	G
Serbian Renewal Movement; Српски покрет обнове Srpski pokret obnove	SPO	Vuk Drašković	Monarchism; Atlanticism	Centre-right	45 / 250	O
Yugoslav Left; Југословенска Левица; Jugoslovenska Levica	JUL	Mirjana Marković	Communism; Yugoslavism	Left wing	20 / 250	G
New Democracy; Нова демократија Nova demokratija	ND	Dušan Mihajlović	Liberalism; Social democracy	Centre to centre-left	5 / 250	O
Democratic Fellowship of Vojvodina Hungarians; Демократска заједница војвођанских Мађара; Demokratska zajednica vojvođanskih Mađara	DZVM	Sándor Páll	Hungarian minority politics Regionalism	Centre	4 / 250	O
Alliance of Vojvodina Hungarians; Савез војвођанских Мађара; Savez vojvođanskih Mađara	SVM	József Kasza	Hungarian minority politics Pro-Europeanism	Centre-right	4 / 250	O
Party of Democratic Action of Sandžak; Странка демократске акције Санџака; Stranka demokratske akcije Sandžaka	SDA S	Sulejman Ugljanin	Bosniak minority politics Separatism	Right-wing	3 / 250	O
Democratic Alternative; Демократска Алтернатива; Demokratska Аlternativa	DA	Nebojša Čović	Social democracy Democratic socialism	Centre-left	1 / 250	O
Party for Democratic Action; Партија за демократско деловање Partija za demokratsko delovanje	PDD	Riza Halimi	Albanian minority politics Regionalism	Right-wing	1 / 250	O
