= Milka Marinković =

Serbian politician

Milka Marinković (Serbian Cyrillic: Милка Маринковић; born 3 December 1955) is a Serbian lawyer and former politician. She was the mayor of Požega from 2000 to 2004 and served in the Serbian parliament from 2001 to 2004. Initially a member of the Democratic Party (DS), Marinković later joined the breakaway Liberal Democratic Party (LDP).

== Early life and career ==
Marinković was born in the village of Zeoke in the municipality of Lučani, in what was then the People's Republic of Serbia in the Federal People's Republic of Yugoslavia. She completed elementary and high school in Čačak, later graduated from the University of Belgrade Faculty of Law, and moved to Požega in 1980.

== Politician ==
=== Democratic Party ===
Marinković joined the DS in 1990. In the decade that followed, Serbian politics was dominated by the authoritarian rule of Socialist Party of Serbia (SPS) leader Slobodan Milošević.

The DS joined an opposition coalition called Zajedno (English: Together) in 1996. Zajedno won several Serbian cities in the 1996 Serbian local elections; in Požega, the coalition won a narrow majority with twenty-seven seats out of fifty-two. When the assembly convened, Tihomir Marjanović of the Serbian Renewal Movement (SPO) became mayor and Marinković became deputy mayor. She served in this role for the term that followed.

In 2000, the DS joined a new coalition called the Democratic Opposition of Serbia (DOS), a broad and ideologically diverse collection of parties opposed to Milošević's continued rule. DOS candidate Vojislav Koštunica defeated Milošević in the 2000 Yugoslavian presidential election, and Milošević fell from power on 5 October 2000. In the 2000 Serbian local elections, which took place concurrently with the Yugoslavian vote, the DOS won forty out of fifty-two seats in Požega, working locally in an alliance with the SPO (which had previously been part of Zajedno but was not part of the DOS). After the election, Marinković was chosen as mayor of the municipality.

The Serbian government also fell after Milošević's defeat in the Yugoslavian vote, and a new Serbian parliamentary election was called for December 2000. Prior to the vote, Serbia's electoral laws were reformed such that the entire country became a single at-large district and all mandates were awarded to candidates on successful electoral lists at the discretion of the sponsoring parties or coalitions, irrespective of numerical order. Marinković appeared in the 145th position on the DOS's list and was awarded a mandate after it won a landslide victory with 176 out of 250 seats. In the assembly, she served on the committee on constitutional affairs and the committee on the judiciary and administration.

The DS contested the 2003 Serbian parliamentary election at the head of its own coalition list, which won thirty-seven mandates. Marinković appeared in the 165th position and was not given a mandate for a second term. She stood down from parliament when the new assembly convened in January 2004.

Serbia introduced the direct election of mayors for the 2004 local elections. Marinković did not seek re-election as mayor of Požega, and her term ended that year.

=== Liberal Democratic Party ===
Čedomir Jovanović was expelled from the Democratic Party in 2004 and founded the Liberal Democratic Party in November 2005. Marinković joined the new party and was elected to its inaugural presidency.

She appeared on the LDP's electoral lists in the 2007 and 2008 Serbian parliamentary elections, although she did not receive a mandate on either occasion. (Note: Marinković appeared in the 118th position on the party's list in 2007 and the 119th position in 2008. In both cases, the lists were mostly alphabetical. The LDP's list won fifteen seats in 2007 and thirteen in 2008.)

=== Recent years ===
In 2019, Marinković started an independent party called Free Požega. The party did not contest the 2020 Serbian local elections, possibly due to a broader opposition boycott.
