= Zlatko Radić =

Serbian politician

- Златко Радић

Member of the National Assembly of the Republic of Serbia
- In office 17 February 2004 – 14 February 2007

Personal details
- Born: 21 January 1972 (age 54)
- Party: SRS

Zlatko Radić (Serbian Cyrillic: Златко Радић; born 21 January 1972) is a Serbian politician. He was a member of the National Assembly of Serbia from 2004 to 2007 and has served on the municipal council in his home community of Lapovo. Radić is a member of the far-right Serbian Radical Party (SRS).

== Private career ==
Radić is an independent caterer.

== Politician ==
=== Parliamentarian (2004–07) ===
Radić received the ninety-fourth position on the Radical Party's electoral list in the 2003 Serbian parliamentary election. The list won eighty-two seats; he was not initially included in the party's assembly delegation but was awarded a mandate on 17 February 2004 as the replacement for another SRS member. (From 2000 to 2011, mandates in Serbian parliamentary elections were awarded to successful parties or coalitions rather than individual candidates, and it was common practice for the mandates to be assigned out of numerical order. Radić's specific list position had no formal bearing on whether or when he received a mandate.) Although the Radicals won more seats than any other party in the 2003 election, they fell well short of a majority and ultimately served in opposition. Radić was a member of the assembly committee on trade and tourism and the committee on poverty reduction.

While serving as a parliamentarian, Radić was involved in a bar fight in Lapovo. He sought to defend his actions by saying he had beaten up a local drug dealer who had been dealing in his café. His parliamentary immunity in the matter was confirmed, and he did not face charges.

=== Politics at the republic level since 2007 ===
Radić was not a candidate in the 2007 Serbian parliamentary election, and his assembly term ended that year. He appeared in the 189th position on the SRS list in the 2008 parliamentary election but was not given a mandate afterward. The Radical Party experienced a serious split later in 2008, with several members joining the more moderate Serbian Progressive Party (SNS) under the leadership of Tomislav Nikolić and Aleksandar Vučić. Radić remained with the Radicals.

Serbia's electoral system was reformed in 2011, such that mandates were awarded to candidates on successful lists in numerical order. Radić was given the 229th position (out of 250) on the Radical Party's list in the 2012 Serbian parliamentary election. This was too low a position for election to be a realistic prospect, and the list did not cross the electoral threshold in any event.

=== Local politics in Lapovo ===
Radić was the Radical Party's candidate for Lapovo's fourteenth division in the 2000 Serbian local elections. Like all SRS candidates in the municipality in this cycle, he was defeated.

Serbia changed its system of local elections in the 2004 cycle, introducing the direct election of mayors and proportional representation for local assemblies. Radić ran as the Radical Party's mayoral candidate in Lapovo and finished third. He also appeared in the second position on SRS list for the Lapovo assembly and was elected when the party won six mandates.

The direct election of mayors was abandoned after a single term. Radić was re-elected in the 2008 local elections when the Radicals won eight seats in Lapovo, finishing second against the Serbian Renewal Movement (SPO). In the 2012 local elections, he appeared in the second position on the SRS list and was not elected when the list failed to cross the threshold.

Radić again appeared in the second position on the SRS list in the 2016 local elections and was this time re-elected when the list won two mandates. The SPO won the election in Lapovo but did not have a majority and formed a grand coalition with the SNS. The SRS also participated in the government, and Radić was appointed to the municipal council (i.e., the executive branch of the municipal government) with responsibility for catering and tourism. He served for the term that followed.

Radić led the SRS list in Lapovo for the 2020 Serbian local elections and was re-elected when the list won a single mandate. He resigned his seat on 16 November 2020.

== Electoral record ==
=== Local (Lapovo) ===
2004 Municipality of Lapovo local election: Mayor of Lapovo
Candidate	Party	First round		Second round	
Candidate	Party	Votes	%	Votes	%
Dragan Zlatković	Serbian Renewal Movement	936	25.68	2,389	72.95
Borivoje Jelenković	Democratic Party	642	17.61	886	27.05
Zlatko Radić	Serbian Radical Party	603	16.54		
Dragan Mikić	Citizens' Group: For Lapovo	384	10.53		
Dragan Petković	Socialist Party of Serbia	282	7.74		
Miroslav Jovanović	Strength of Serbia Movement	171	4.69		
Ratomir Kojanic	Democratic Party of Serbia	163	4.47		
Dragutin Dostanić	Liberals of Serbia–Movement for Lapovo	144	3.95		
Miladin Džinović	G17 Plus	102	2.80		
Veroljub Milojković	Citizens' Group: Revival of Lapovo	89	2.44		
Sašimir Gajić	Party of Serbian Unity	71	1.95		
Dragan Lazarević	Citizens' Group: Delom na Videlo	58	1.59		
Total		3,645	100.00	3,275	100.00
