= Radovan Radović =

Radovan Radović may refer to:

- Radovan Radović (basketball)
- Radovan Radović (politician)
