= 4th National Assembly =

4th National Assembly may refer to:

- 4th National Assembly at Argos
- 4th National Assembly of France
- 4th National Assembly of Laos
- 4th National Assembly of Namibia
- 4th National Assembly of Nigeria
- 4th National Assembly of Pakistan
- 4th National Assembly of Serbia
- 4th National Assembly for Wales
