= Dragomir Pavlović =

Dragomir Pavlović may refer to:

- Dragomir Pavlović (Serbian politician, born 1957)
- Dragomir Pavlović (Serbian politician, born 1958)
