= 5th National Assembly =

5th National Assembly may refer to:

- 5th National Assembly of France
- 5th National Assembly of Laos
- 5th National Assembly at Nafplion
- 5th National Assembly of Namibia
- 5th National Assembly of Nigeria
- 5th National Assembly of Pakistan
- 5th National Assembly of Serbia
- 5th National Assembly of South Africa
- 5th National Assembly for Wales
