= Miroslav Aleksić =

Miroslav Aleksić may refer to:

- Miroslav Aleksić (born 1954), Serbian politician
- Miroslav Aleksić (born 1978), Serbian politician
- Miroslav "Miša" Aleksić (1953–2020), Serbian musician
