= Pečat =

Serbian weekly news magazine

Pečat (Serbian-Cyrillic: Печат; English: Seal) is a weekly Serbian news magazine.

The magazine has been founded by Milorad Vučelić in 2007. The Media Ownership Monitor of Reporters without borders describes the business structure of the editing publishing company Naš pečat and the involved founding company BAAM Trade (company for production, services, interior and foreign trade) as non-transparent: it is a closed joint stock company and the ownership is not visible in the public company registry. According to the organization, the magazine is national conservative and pro-Russian in its information policy. There is an English category (Pečat in English) on its website available which includes articles by Deyan Ranko Brashich only.

The magazine promotes a Seal of Time Award for Science and Social Theory (Pečat vremena za nauku i društvenu teoriju) which has been awarded annually since 2011. There is also a separate channel on YouTube where the awards ceremonies can be viewed. Among the 21 laureates are personalities such as Matija Bećković, Milovan Danojlić, Labud Dragić, Milorad Ekmečić, Vasilije Krestić and Milovan Vitezović.
