= Party of Serbian Progress =

Party of Serbian Progress Партија српског прогреса Partija srpskog progresa
- Abbreviation: PSP
- Leader: Miodrag 'Miki' Vujović
- Founded: 30 May 2000
- Dissolved: 19 April 2010
- Headquarters: Ilije Garašanina 20, Belgrade
- Ideology: Serbian nationalism
- Political position: Right-wing

Website
- www.psp.org.yu (archived)

The Party of Serbian Progress (Serbian: Партија српског прогреса/ Partija srpskog progresa) was a minor political party in Serbia.

== History ==
The party was founded on 30 May 2000 by lawyer Miodrag Miki Vujović. It was sponsored by TV Palma, also owned by Vujović.

In the 2000 parliamentary election, the PSP went in coalition with the right-wing Party of Serbian Unity. The coalition won 5.33% of the popular vote and 14 seats, of which 2 were awarded to the PSP. Vujović was famously not listed as a candidate, promising to be the only party president not in the assembly.

The PSP was among the parties requesting a review of the constitutionality of the Law on the one-time tax on extra profit gained and property acquired by use of special privileges (from 1989 until the summer 2001). The law targeted individuals and parties close to the previous SPS regime.

The party was dissolved on 19 April 2010 as part of the re-registration process, when stricter rules were introduced for political parties.

== Electoral results ==
=== Parliamentary elections ===
Year	Popular vote	% of popular vote	# of seats	Seat change	Coalitions	Government
2000	200,052	5.33%	2 / 250	▲2	SSJ-UPS-SSS	opposition

== Notable members ==
- Miodrag Miki Vujović, lawyer, media personality and party president
- Jovan I. Deretić, pseudohistorian and MP
