= Labud Dragić =

Serbian writer of Montenegrin origin

Labud Dragić (Serbian-Cyrillic: Лабуд Драгић; born 24 October 1954, in Ljevišta, SR Montenegro, SFR Yugoslavia) is a Serbian writer of Montenegrin origin.

== Life and work ==
Labud Dragić was born in Ljevišta, a very small village of Morača Highland in Montenegrin municipality of Kolašin. Dragić attended a gymnasium in Sarajevo with maturity diploma in 1973, then he studied literary science with a focus on literary theory at the Philological Faculty of Belgrade's University and graduated in 1979. The writer is current member of the Association of Writers of Serbia. Dragić has already been a frequent visitor to Serbian Canadian community in Ontario. The artist lives in New Belgrade.

So far, his texts were published in literary magazines such as Polja (Serbian: Fields), Književna reč (Serbian: Literary Word), Nova Zora (Serbian: New Zora), Trag (Serbian: Trace), the Serbian Canadian weekly newspaper Novine Toronto (Serbian: Toronto News) and some others. In 2017, he received the Isidora Sekulić Award, the Momo Kapor Award, the Svetozar Ćorović Award and the Seal of Time Award for Science and Social Theory (Pečat vremena za nauku i društvenu teoriju) for his novel Kukavičja pilad (Cuckoo Chicks). The plot and the fate of its characters deals with the events at the time of last Montenegrin King Nikola I Petrović-Njegoš towards the end of World War I. The title of the novel has a metaphorical meaning: the Serbian word cuckoo can be used synonymously for coward.

The multiple laureate already commented on prizes many years ago in an article (Literary Evaluation of the Day) of Hereticus magazine as follows:

I have never thought about prizes, nor did I deal with that form of social games.

== Bibliography (selection) ==
- Koji nemaju pečata : pripovetke (Those Who Do Not Have A Stamp : short stories), Rad, Belgrade 1985.
- Sram u katedrali : pripovetke (Shame In Cathedral : short stories), Rad, Belgrade 1990, ISBN 86-09-00280-2.
- Dolinom senki (Valley Shadows; novel), Pobjeda, Titograd 1994, ISBN 86-487-0002-7.
- Divlji anđeo (Wild Angel; short stories), Prosveta, Belgrade 1999.
- U zatonima Lete (In Backwater Of Lethe; short stories), Srpska književna zadruga, Belgrade 2003, ISBN 86-379-0849-7.
- Krv i voda (Blood And Water; novel), Edit print, Belgrade 2007, ISBN 978-86-17-15035-6.
- Bele noći sivog sokola (White Nights Of Grey Falcon; novel), Službeni glasnik, Belgrade 2013, ISBN 978-86-519-0902-6.
- Kukavičja pilad (Cuckoo Chicks; novel), Srpska književna zadruga, Belgrade 2016, ISBN 978-86-379-1328-3.
