= Left Coalition (Serbia) =

Left Coalition Лева коалиција Leva koalicija
- Leader: Slobodan Milošević
- Founded: 1994
- Dissolved: 2000
- Headquarters: Belgrade
- Ideology: Socialism; Populism; Left-wing nationalism
- Political position: Left-wing

The Left Coalition (Serbian: Лева коалиција, romanized: Leva koalicija) was a coalition of left-wing nationalist political parties in Serbia for the 1996 Yugoslavian parliamentary election and then for the 1997 Serbian general election.

== History ==
The coalition was made up of the Socialist Party of Serbia (SPS), Yugoslav Left (JUL) and New Democracy (ND). It was led by Slobodan Milošević the leader of SPS, but also main actors were Mirjana Marković the leader of Yugoslav Left and Dušan Mihajlović the leader of New Democracy. Following the 1997 election, it formed a coalition government with the Serbian Radical Party (SRS). In 1998 ND left the coalition and after the defeat in the 2000 Yugoslavian general election the Left Coalition was disbanded.

== Members ==
Name	Leader	Main ideology	Political position	Membership	MPs (1997)
Socialist Party of Serbia (SPS)	Slobodan Milošević	Socialism	Left-wing	1994—2000	85 / 250
Yugoslav Left (JUL)	Mirjana Marković	Communism	Far-left	1994—2000	20 / 250
New Democracy (ND)	Dušan Mihajlović	Liberalism	Centre to centre-left	1994—1998	5 / 250
