= Council of Serbian Unity =

Political party in Serbia

Council of Serbian Unity Сабор српског јединства Sabor srpskoj jedinstva
- Abbreviation: SSJ
- President: Borislav Pelević
- Founded: 2013
- Dissolved: 2014
- Headquarters: Belgrade
- Ideology: Serbian ultranationalism
- Political position: Far-right

Website
- ssj.rs (Archived URL)

The Council of Serbian Unity (Serbian Cyrillic: Сабор српског јединства, romanized: Sabor srpskog jedinstva, abbr. SSJ) was a political party in Serbia, founded in 2013 by Borislav Pelević.

The Council of Serbian Unity is a re-founding of the Party of Serbian Unity previously led by Pelević before it merged into the Serbian Radical Party in 2007. Following the 2008 split in the SRS and founding of the Serbian Progressive Party, Pelević was elected MP on the SNS ballot in the 2012 election but soon developed disagreements over SNS policies on Kosovo and the EU, eventually leaving the SNS parliamentary group and becoming an independent MP.

Due to the new registration law, the Council of Serbian Unity did not have enough time to register in time for the 2014 election, instead running as the Patriotic Front, gaining only 0.13% of the votes.
