= Democratic Socialist Party (Serbia) =

Political party in Serbia

The Democratic Socialist Party (Serbian: Демократска социјалистичка партија, romanized: Demokratska Socijalistička Partija, abbr. DSP) was a short-lived political party in Serbia. It was established in November 2000 by former members of the Socialist Party of Serbia (SPS). The party's leader was Milorad Vučelić.

== Background and formation ==
The Socialist Party of Serbia, which was the dominant political force in Serbia and the Federal Republic of Yugoslavia between 1990 and 2000, lost its hold on power after the defeat of party leader Slobodan Milošević in the 2000 Yugoslavian presidential election and his subsequent downfall in the 5 October Revolution. The party entered an internal crisis after this time, and on 17 October 2000 several formally prominent SPS figures, including Vučelić, called for Milošević's removal as leader. Their efforts were unsuccessful; Milošević was able to consolidate his control over the party organization and remained as SPS leader until his death in 2006.

Vučelić founded the Democratic Socialist Party on 17 November 2000. Its members included several other former Socialists, most notably Borisav Jović. In announcing the party's formation, Vučelić was quoted as saying, "Unfortunately, the fate of the SPS is in the hands of the leadership that has caused great damage to it so far. With that leadership, there will not be too many voters and too many people left in the party." He described the DSP as a "modern democratic party with a leftist, socialist orientation" and said that he was open to working with other leftist democratic parties.

== 2000 Serbian election and afterward ==
The DSP fielded its own electoral list in the 2000 Serbian parliamentary election, with Jović in the lead position and Vučelić in second place. The list also included prominent former Socialists such as Slobodan Babić and Radovan Radović. The party fared poorly, receiving less than one per cent of the popular vote and winning no mandates.

The DSP appears to have become dormant after this time, and it ultimately merged back into the Socialist Party in February 2003.
