= December 2002 Serbian presidential election =

- 8 December 2002
- Turnout: 45.16% (▼0.29 pp)
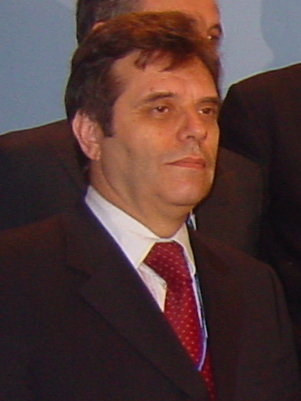

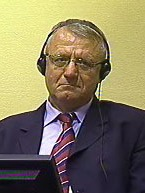
Candidate	Vojislav Koštunica	Vojislav Šešelj
Party	DSS	SRS
Popular vote	1,699,098	1,063,296
Percentage	59.28%	37.10%
President before election
Milan Milutinović
SPS
Elected President
Election results annulled
Nataša Mićić (acting)
GSS

Presidential elections were held in the Yugoslav province of Serbia on 8 December 2002. They followed elections in September and October which were invalidated due to voter turnout not meeting the 50% requirement. Although the legal requirement of a turnout of at least 50% of registered voters was dropped for the second round of this election, turnout in the first round was below 50%, invalidating the election before a second round.

During the election the Socialist Party of Serbia supported Vojislav Šešelj, the leader of Serbian Radical Party, while New Serbia supported Vojislav Koštunica and the Democratic Party of Serbia.

== Results ==
Candidate	Party	Votes	%
Vojislav Koštunica	Democratic Party of Serbia–New Serbia	1,699,098	59.28
Vojislav Šešelj	Serbian Radical Party–Socialist Party of Serbia	1,063,296	37.10
Borislav Pelević	Party of Serbian Unity	103,926	3.63
Total		2,866,320	100.00
Valid votes		2,866,320	97.27
Invalid/blank votes		80,396	2.73
Total votes		2,946,716	100.00
Registered voters/turnout		6,525,760	45.16
Source: CeSID
