= Miroslav Aleksić (born 1954) =

Serbian politician

Miroslav Aleksić (Serbian Cyrillic: Мирослав Алексић; born 1954) is a politician in Serbia. He was a founding member of the Democratic Party of Serbia (Demokratska stranka Srbije, DSS) and served in the Assembly of the Federal Republic of Yugoslavia, the Assembly of Serbia and Montenegro, and the Assembly of the City of Belgrade as a party member. He resigned from the DSS in 2014.

He is not to be confused with a different DSS official named Miroslav Aleksić, who was based in Vrbas.

== Private career ==
Aleksić has a degree in economics and lives in Belgrade.

== Political career ==
Aleksić was a candidate for the National Assembly of Serbia in the 1993 parliamentary election, appearing in the forty-second position (out of forty-six) on the DSS's electoral list in Belgrade. The party won four seats in the city, and he was not included in its assembly delegation. (From 1992 to 2000, one-third of Serbia's parliamentary mandates were assigned to candidates from successful lists in numerical order, while the remaining two-thirds were distributed amongst other candidates at the discretion of the sponsoring parties and coalitions. Aleksić could have been awarded a mandate despite his low position on the list.)

For the 2000 Yugoslavian federal election, the DSS participated in the Democratic Opposition of Serbia (DOS), a broad coalition of parties opposed to Slobodan Milošević's rule. Aleksić was awarded the third position on the DOS's electoral list for the Yugoslavian parliament's Chamber of Citizens in the four-member Belgrade division of Palilula. The list won three seats, and he was granted a mandate. (For the 2000 election, half of the mandates were awarded to successful lists in numerical order, and the other half were distributed at the discretion of the sponsoring parties or coalitions. Aleksić did not automatically receive a mandate by virtue of his position but was included as a DSS representative all the same.) He was also elected to the Assembly of the City of Belgrade in the concurrent 2000 local elections for Barajevo's second division, a single-member constituency. The DOS won both elections, and Aleksić initially served as a government supporter. On 8 December 2000, he was appointed as an assistant minister of transport in the government of Yugoslavia with responsibility for river transport. The DSS left the DOS in 2002 and moved into opposition.

The Federal Republic of Yugoslavia was re-constituted as the State Union of Serbia and Montenegro in 2003, and the old Yugoslavian parliament was replaced by a new unicameral assembly. The first members of this assembly were selected via indirect election by the republican parliaments of Serbia and Montenegro; only serving members of the republican parliaments or outgoing members of the previous federal parliament were eligible. Aleksić was chosen as one of the DSS's delegates.

Aleksić once again sought election to the National Assembly of Serbia in the 2003 parliamentary election, appearing in the 101st position on the DSS's list. By this time, the entire country had been restructured as a single electoral unit, and all mandates were assigned at the discretion parties that crossed the electoral threshold. The DSS won fifty-three seats, and Aleksić was not granted a mandate.

His first term in the Assembly of Serbia and Montenegro ended in early 2004, when the republican parliament in Serbia selected new representatives. While not initially included in his party's delegation, he received a new federal mandate on 23 March 2004 as the replacement for another DSS member. The federal assembly ceased to exist in 2006, when Montenegro withdrew from the state union.

Aleksić did not seek re-election to the Belgrade city assembly in 2004.

Several prominent DSS members, including Aleksić, left the party in 2014, citing dissatisfaction with its recent direction.
