= September–October 2002 Serbian presidential election =

- 29 September 2002 (first round); 13 October 2002 (second round)
- Turnout: 45.45% (▼5.49 pp)
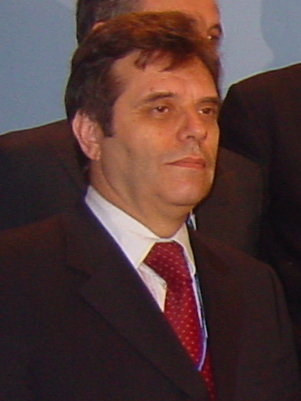

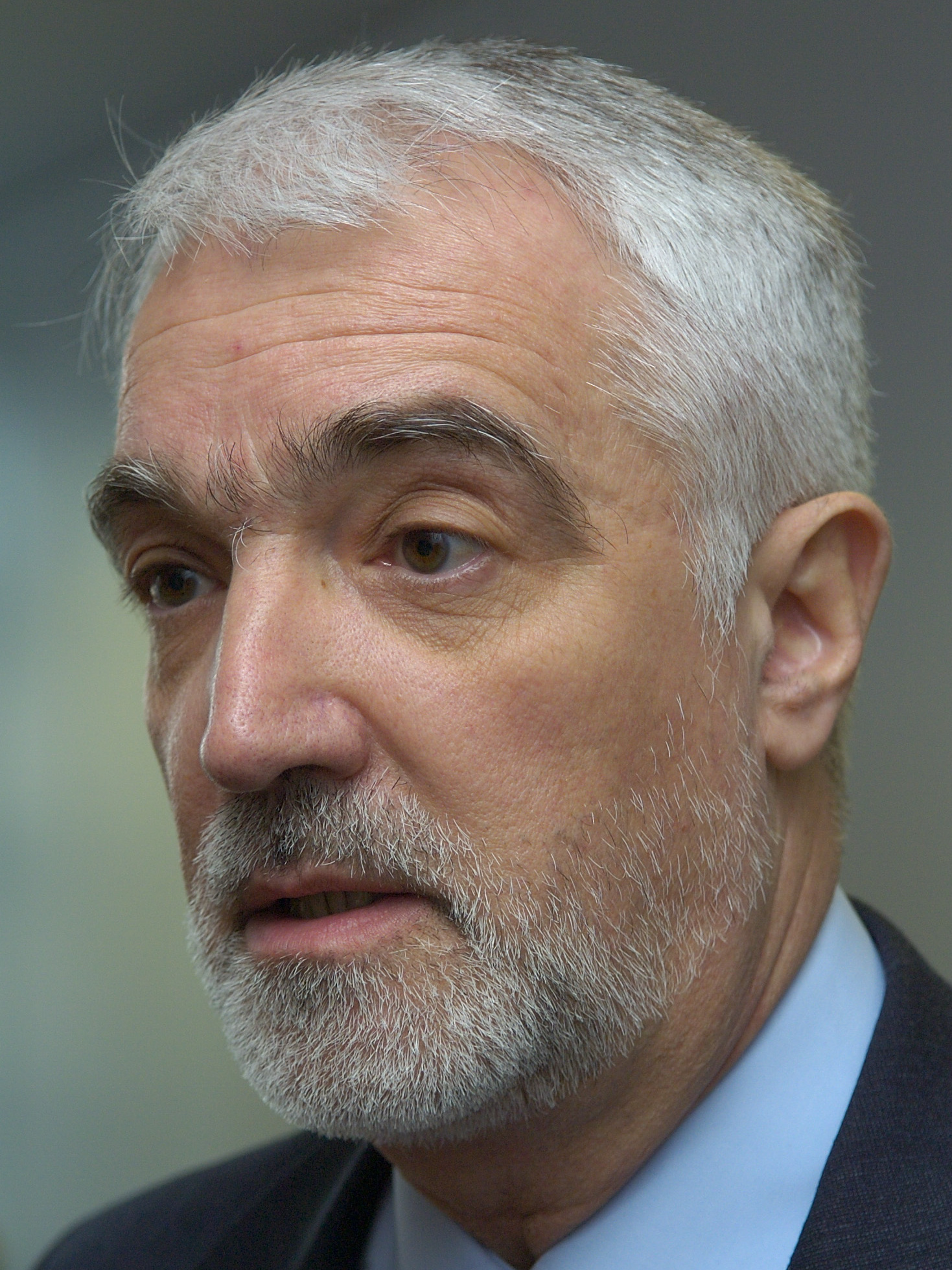
Candidate	Vojislav Koštunica	Miroljub Labus
Party	DSS	Independent
Popular vote	1,991,947	921,094
Percentage	68.38%	31.62%
President before election
Milan Milutinović
SPS
Elected President
Election results annulled
Milan Milutinović
SPS

Presidential elections were held in the Yugoslav province of Serbia on 29 September 2002, with a second round on 13 October. However, the result was invalidated because turnout in the second round was less than 50%. Fresh elections were held in December.

== Results ==
Candidate	Party	First round		Second round	
Candidate	Party	Votes	%	Votes	%
Vojislav Koštunica	Democratic Party of Serbia	1,123,420	31.56	1,991,947	68.38
Miroljub Labus	Citizens' Group: Best for Serbia – Miroljub Labus	995,200	27.96	921,094	31.62
Vojislav Šešelj	Serbian Radical Party	845,308	23.74		
Vuk Drašković	Serbian Renewal Movement	159,959	4.49		
Borislav Pelević	Party of Serbian Unity	139,047	3.91		
Bata Živojinović	Socialist Party of Serbia	119,052	3.34		
Nebojša Pavković	Citizens' Group	75,662	2.13		
Branislav-Bane Ivković	Citizens' Group: Socialists for Return to the Basics	42,853	1.20		
Vuk Obradović	Social Democracy	26,050	0.73		
Tomislav Lalošević	Citizens' Group	25,133	0.71		
Dragan Radenović	Citizens' Group: Society of Free Citizens	8,280	0.23		
Total		3,559,964	100.00	2,913,041	100.00
Valid votes		3,559,964	97.95	2,913,041	97.80
Invalid/blank votes		74,534	2.05	65,427	2.20
Total votes		3,634,498	100.00	2,978,468	100.00
Registered voters/turnout		6,553,042	55.46	6,553,042	45.45
Source: RIK, RIK
