= Milorad Vučelić =

Serbian journalist and businessman

President of FK Partizan
- In office 24 October 2016 – 22 October 2024
- Preceded by: Ivan Ćurković
- Succeeded by: Rasim Ljajić

President of JSD Partizan
- In office 27 October 2015 – 12 September 2022
- Preceded by: Duško Vujošević
- Succeeded by: Ostoja Mijailović

Personal details
- Born: 17 June 1948 (age 78) Sivac, PR Serbia, FPR Yugoslavia
- Party: Socialist Party of Serbia (1992–1995; 1997–1998; 2003–2006); Democratic Socialist Party (2000–2003); League of Communists of Yugoslavia (1967–1990)
- Education: University of Belgrade Faculty of Law

Milorad Vučelić (Serbian Cyrillic: Милорад Вучелић; born 17 June 1948) is a Serbian journalist and businessman.

He is the editor-in-chief of Večernje novosti and owner of Serbian weekly magazine Pečat.

== Early life ==
Vučelić was born into a family originating from Montenegro that, after the end of the Second World War, settled in the northern Serbian village of Sivac in the municipality of Kula in what was then PR Serbia, FPR Yugoslavia. By descent, Vučelić is a member of the Bratonožići clan. Vučelić's father was one of the upper-echelon members of the Yugoslav State Security Administration stationed in Subotica. After finishing elementary school in Crvenka and high school in Vrbas, Vučelić moved to Belgrade to study law at the University of Belgrade's Faculty of Law.

== Career ==
Vučelić is a former vice-president of the Socialist Party of Serbia. He was the general director of the Radio Television of Serbia from 1992 to 1995. Vučelić was detained during Operation Sabre in 2003 but was quickly released.

=== FK Partizan ===
In 2014, he became the vice-president of FK Partizan. In 2015, he became the president of the Partizan Sport Society and in 2016, he was selected as president of FK Partizan. In 2022, he was replaced by Ostoja Mijailović as president of the Sport Society and he resigned as club president in 2023.

== Personal life ==
He was married to actress Ljiljana Dragutinović with whom he has a son named Branislav and a daughter named Ana.

Preceded by Ivan Ćurković (acting)	President of FK Partizan; 2016–2023	Succeeded by TBD
