= Borislav Pelević =

Serbian politician

- Борислав Пелевић
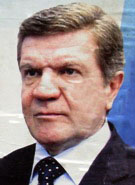
- Pelević in 2013

Personal details
- Born: 22 November 1956 Bublje, PR Serbia, FPR Yugoslavia
- Died: 25 October 2018 (aged 61) Belgrade, Serbia
- Party: SSJ (1993–2007); SRS (2007–2008); SNS (2008–2013); SSJ (2013–2014)
- Children: 5
- Occupation: Politician

Military service
- Allegiance: Yugoslavia; Serbian Krajina; Republika Srpska
- Years of service: 1991–1996
- Rank: Commander
- Unit: Serb Volunteer Guard
- Battles/wars: Croatian War of Independence

Borislav Pelević (Serbian Cyrillic: Борислав Пелевић; 22 November 1956 – 25 October 2018) was a Serbian politician. He was president of the nationalist Party of Serbian Unity (SSJ), a party with marginal importance in Serbian politics, until it merged with the Serbian Radical Party in December 2007.

== Military and political career ==
Pelević was a commander of the Serb Volunteer Guard paramilitary during the Croatian War of Independence, serving at the Erdut training camp. He was also a presidential candidate in September and December 2002 and in 2004.

He was elected to the National Assembly of Serbia on the Serbian Radical Party list twice, in 2007 and 2008. After the party's deputy leader, Tomislav Nikolić, resigned from the SRS and formed the new Serbian Progressive Party, Pelević left the SRS and joined Nikolić's group. He was elected MP on the SNS ballot in the 2012 election but soon developed disagreements over SNS policies on Kosovo and the European Union, eventually leaving the SNS and becoming an independent MP.

On 21 January 2013, the SSJ party was re-founded as the Council of Serbian Unity by Pelević, Slobodan Radosavljević and Jelena Kostić in Belgrade. The new party took part in the 2014 parliamentary election as part of the Patriotic Front, but failed to reach the 5% threshold.

== Death ==
He died on 25 October 2018, after a long illness.
