= 1997 Serbian general election =

- Presidential election
- 21 September 1997 (first round); 5 October 1997 (second round)
- Turnout: 48.95% (▼15.20 pp)
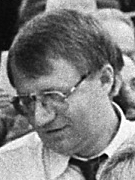

Candidate	Vojislav Šešelj	Zoran Lilić
Party	SRS	SPS
Popular vote	1,733,859	1,691,354
Percentage	50.62%	49.38%
President before election
Dragan Tomić (acting)
SPS
Elected President
Election results annulled
Dragan Tomić (acting)
SPS
- Parliamentary election
- 21 September 1997
- Turnout: 57.37% (▼3.93 pp)
Party	Leader	Vote %	Seats	+/–
SPS–JUL–ND	Slobodan Milošević	35.70	110	−18
SRS	Vojislav Šešelj	29.26	82	+43
SPO	Vuk Drašković	19.99	45	+8
KV	Sándor Páll	2.83	4	−1
DA	Nebojša Čović	1.53	1	New
VMSZ	József Kasza	1.28	4	New
LZS	Sulejman Ugljanin	1.25	3	New
DKPB	Ramadan Ameti	0.36	1	New
This lists parties that won seats. See the complete results below.
Results of the presidential election by district
Prime Minister before	Prime Minister after
Mirko Marjanović; SPS	Mirko Marjanović; SPS

General elections were held in the Yugoslav province of Serbia on 21 September 1997, to elect the president and members of the National Assembly. With no presidential candidate receiving over 50% of the vote in the first round, a second round was held on 5 October. Running on a platform of nationalism and neoliberal economic reforms, Vojislav Šešelj of the Serbian Radical Party received the most votes in the runoff. However, voter turnout was only 49%, below the required 50%. As a result, the elections were annulled, and fresh elections were scheduled for December.

In the National Assembly elections, the Socialist Party of Serbia–Yugoslav Left–New Democracy coalition emerged as the largest in the Assembly, winning 110 of the 250 seats.

The elections were boycotted by several major opposition parties, including the Democratic Party, the Democratic Party of Serbia and the Civic Alliance of Serbia, which claimed that the elections would not be held under fair conditions. Most Kosovo Albanians also boycotted the elections, who made up around 17% of the population, due to increasing ethnic tensions in Kosovo.

== Electoral lists ==
Following electoral lists are electoral lists that received seats in the National Assembly after the 1997 election:

#	Ballot name	Representative	Main ideology	Political position
1	Socialist Party of Serbia, Yugoslav Left, New Democracy – Slobodan Milošević; SPS, JUL, ND	Slobodan Milošević	Socialism	Left-wing
2	Serbian Radical Party – dr Vojislav Šešelj; SRS	Vojislav Šešelj	Ultranationalism	Far-right
3	Serbian Renewal Movement – Vuk Drašković; SPO	Vuk Drašković	Conservatism	Centre-right
4	Coalition "Vojvodina" – Miodrag Mile Isakov – Nenad Čanak; LSV, NSS, RDSV	Nenad Čanak	Vojvodina autonomism	Centre-left
5	Alliance of Vojvodina Hungarians; VMSZ/SVM	József Kasza	Minority politics	Centre-left
6	"List for Sandžak dr Sulejman Ugljanin"; SDAS, BDSS	Sulejman Ugljanin	Minority politics	Right-wing
7	Democratic Alternative (DA) – Peasant Party of Serbia (SSS) – Pensioners Party of Serbia (PPS) – Nebojša Čović; DA, SSS, PPS	Nebojša Čović	Social democracy	Centre-left
8	Democratic Coalition Preševo–Bujanovac; DKPB	Ramadan Ameti	Minority politics	Centre

== Results ==
=== Presidential ===
Candidate	Party	First round		Second round	
Candidate	Party	Votes	%	Votes	%
Zoran Lilić	Left Coalition (SPS–JUL–ND)	1,474,924	37.12	1,691,354	49.38
Vojislav Šešelj	Serbian Radical Party	1,126,940	28.36	1,733,859	50.62
Vuk Drašković	Serbian Renewal Movement	852,808	21.46		
Mile Isakov	Vojvodina Coalition	111,166	2.80		
Vuk Obradović	Social Democracy	100,523	2.53		
Nebojša Čović	Democratic Alternative–SSS	93,133	2.34		
Sulejman Ugljanin	List for Sandžak (SDA S)	68,446	1.72		
Milisav Banković	Workers' Party of Yugoslavia	49,158	1.24		
Milan Paroški	People's Party	27,100	0.68		
Miodrag Vidojković	Independent	14,105	0.36		
Predrag Vuletić	Liberal Democratic Party	11,463	0.29		
Dragan Đorđević	Party of Citizens of Serbia	10,684	0.27		
Milan Mladenović	Revival Coalition	10,112	0.25		
Đorđe Drljačić	Independent	9,430	0.24		
Branko Čičić	Natural Law Party	7,097	0.18		
Gvozden Sakić	Independent	3,293	0.08		
Radomir Tukmanović	Progressive Party	2,647	0.07		
Total		3,973,029	100.00	3,425,213	100.00
Valid votes		3,973,029	96.23	3,425,213	97.05
Invalid/blank votes		155,860	3.77	104,223	2.95
Total votes		4,128,889	100.00	3,529,436	100.00
Registered voters/turnout		7,187,936	57.44	7,210,557	48.95
Source: RIK

=== Parliamentary ===
Party	Votes	%	Seats	+/–
Left Coalition (SPS–JUL–ND)	1,418,036	35.70	110	–18
Serbian Radical Party	1,162,216	29.26	82	+43
Serbian Renewal Movement	793,988	19.99	45	+8
Vojvodina Coalition (LSV–NSS–RV)	112,589	2.83	4	+3
Social Democracy	105,068	2.64	0	New
Democratic Alternative–Peasants Party–Pensioners' Party	60,855	1.53	1	+1
Alliance of Vojvodina Hungarians	50,960	1.28	4	New
List for Sandžak	49,486	1.25	3	New
Democratic Party of Vojvodina Hungarians	16,986	0.43	0	New
Democratic Fellowship of Vojvodina Hungarians	16,812	0.42	0	–5
New Communist Party of Yugoslavia	16,222	0.41	0	0
Radical Party "Nikola Pasic"	15,986	0.40	0	New
People's Party	15,232	0.38	0	0
Democratic Coalition Preševo-Bujanovac	14,179	0.36	1	New
Natural Law Party	8,957	0.23	0	New
League of Communists of Yugoslavia in Serbia	5,760	0.14	0	New
Party of Serbian Unity	5,590	0.14	0	0
Democratic Alliance of Croats in Vojvodina	5,375	0.14	0	0
Vojvodina's Party	4,790	0.12	0	New
Party of Serbian Citizens	4,508	0.11	0	New
Rebirth Coalition – Foreign Currency Savers Party	3,727	0.09	0	New
Alliance of Citizens of Subotica	3,647	0.09	0	New
Sandžak Coalition	3,606	0.09	0	New
Serbian Resistance Movement – Democratic Movement	3,299	0.08	0	New
Pensioners Democratic Party of Serbia	2,956	0.07	0	New
Christian Democratic Movement of Vojvodina Hungarians	2,702	0.07	0	New
Rebirth Coalition	2,652	0.07	0	New
Serbian Peasants' Party	2,197	0.06	0	0
Civic Movement of Vojvodina Hungarians	2,181	0.05	0	New
Workers' Party of Yugoslavia	2,141	0.05	0	New
New Radical Party – Party of the People	2,116	0.05	0	New
Foreign Currency Savers Party	1,895	0.05	0	0
Movement for the Protection of Human Rights	1,849	0.05	0	0
Christian Democratic Union	1,772	0.04	0	New
Serbian Peasants' Party – People's Party	1,489	0.04	0	0
Alliance of Independent Citizens "For Zemun"	1,243	0.03	0	New
Independent Radical Party	1,225	0.03	0	New
Vojvodina Green Party	1,125	0.03	0	New
League of Communists of Yugoslavia	1,026	0.03	0	New
Solidarity	891	0.02	0	New
Green Party	772	0.02	0	0
Communist Party of Yugoslavia	749	0.02	0	0
Sandžak Workers Social Democratic Party	674	0.02	0	New
Liberal Democratic Party	503	0.01	0	New
"Serbian Citizens" – Serbian Citizens Party	477	0.01	0	New
United Opposition of Šumadija	440	0.01	0	0
Rebirth Coalition–Foreign Currency Savers Party–Radical Party	355	0.01	0	0
Yugoslav Working Class "Josip Broz Tito"	351	0.01	0	0
Rebirth Coalition–Monarchist Party of Serbia	296	0.01	0	0
CP of Yugoslavia – Perspective Movement – WP of Yugoslavia	283	0.01	0	0
Universalist Movement	124	0.00	0	New
Independents	40,110	1.01	0	0
Total	3,972,468	100.00	250	0
Valid votes	3,972,468	96.03		
Invalid/blank votes	164,307	3.97		
Total votes	4,136,775	100.00		
Registered voters/turnout	7,210,386	57.37		
Source: Republican Electoral Commission
