= Nebojša Čović =

Serbian politician, businessman and executive

- Небојша Човић
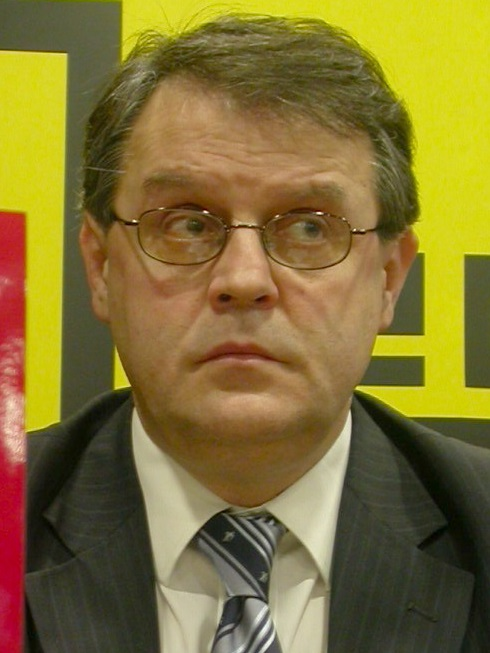
- Čović in 2006

Deputy Prime Minister of Serbia
- In office 25 January 2001 – 3 March 2004
- Prime Minister: Zoran Đinđić; Himself (acting); Zoran Živković
- Preceded by: Spasoje Krunić
- Succeeded by: Miroljub Labus

Prime Minister of Serbia Acting
- In office 12 March 2003 – 16 March 2003
- President: Nataša Mićić (acting)
- Preceded by: Zoran Đinđić
- Succeeded by: Zoran Živković

66th Mayor of Belgrade
- In office 23 June 1994 – 21 February 1997
- Preceded by: Slobodanka Gruden
- Succeeded by: Zoran Đinđić

Personal details
- Born: 2 July 1958 (age 68) Belgrade, PR Serbia, FPR Yugoslavia
- Party: SPS (1990–1997); DA (1997–2004); SDP (2004–2010)
- Education: University of Belgrade
- Occupation: Politician, businessman
- Profession: Mechanical engineer

Nebojša Čović (Serbian Cyrillic: Небојша Човић; born 2 July 1958) is a Serbian businessman, basketball executive, and politician. From 2011 to 2024, he has been serving as the president of Crvena Zvezda Meridianbet Belgrade. From 2024 is president of Basketball Federation of Serbia.

== Early years and education ==
Čović was born in Belgrade, PR Serbia, FPR Yugoslavia, and graduated from the University of Belgrade's Faculty of Mechanical Engineering. In 2000, he obtained his PhD at the same university.

== Political career ==
In 1992, as a member of the Socialist Party of Serbia (SPS), 34-year-old Čović started his climb up the political ladder with a position of executive board vice-president in charge of economy and finances at the Belgrade city assembly.

A year later, in 1993, he advanced to the position of the city government president. In 1994 he got elected as the Mayor of Belgrade. In parallel, Čović was the SPS deputy (MP) in the Serbian National Assembly. Čović was sacked from the mayoral post in mid-January 1997 by the Serbian president and SPS party leader Slobodan Milošević amid the months-long protests in Serbia over the November 1996 municipal elections fraud. He was expelled from SPS on the same occasion.

He became the president of Democratic Alternative (DA) after the party got formed by a certain number of SPS members seceded from SPS in July 1997.

Čović served as the head of the Coordination Center for Kosovo and Metohija and as the head of the Southern Serbia Coordination Center during Preševo Valley conflict (1999–2001).

From 24 October 2000 to 25 January 2001 he was a member of the trio Co-Prime Ministers together with Milomir Minić from SPS and Spasoje Krunić from the Serbian Renewal Movement (SPO) that transitionally governed Serbia after the Bulldozer Revolution, when Mirko Marjanović was sacked. After the assassination of Zoran Đinđić, he was the acting Prime Minister of Serbia from 12 to 16 March 2003.

In May 2002, while serving as head of the Coordination Center for Kosovo and Metohija, participated in transferring the Neolithic figurine Goddess on the Throne from the National Museum in Belgrade to Priština, alongside UNMIK’s Michael Steiner. Čović justified the move as a goodwill gesture toward Kosovo Albanians before status talks. The act drew criticism in Serbia, with concerns over improper handling of national heritage. In Priština, the figurine was celebrated, reframed as the “Illyrian Queen,” and used to support Albanian historical claims, sparking further political and cultural controversy.

In 2004, his party Democratic Alternative merged into the Social Democratic Party (SDP). In 2005, he became president of the Social Democratic Party. The party ceased to exist in 2010.

He was charged with corruption in January 2016.

== Sports administration career ==
=== FMP Železnik (1991–2011) ===
In 1991, Čović became involved with Serbian basketball club KK ILR Železnik, a dormant sports collective for workers of the state-owned Ivo Lola Ribar metallurgical factory. Inactive since 1986, the club got revived by Čović under the auspices of his privately owned metal products factory Fabrika metalnih proizvoda AD and renamed FMP Železnik. Under his guidance and ownership, the club grew into one of the top teams in Serbia and FR Yugoslavia.

By 1993, the club got its own basketball facility – the 2,000-seat Železnik Hall that served as its home arena from then on. Climbing rapidly up the FR Yugoslavia basketball pyramid, FMP began the 1994–95 season in the Second Federal League, winning promotion to the country's top basketball competition for the following 1995–96 season.

In 1998, Čović brought former Yugoslav national team player Ratko Radovanović on board as the club's sporting director. Radovanović soon became synonymous with the emerging club, making player personnel decisions and running its day-to-day operations. Čović's son Filip later played as point guard for the club.

=== Yugoslav Basketball Federation (1995–1997) ===
In late 1995, while simultaneously performing the city of Belgrade mayoral job as well as Serbian National Assembly MP duties, Čović became president of the Yugoslav Basketball Federation (KSJ), succeeding Veselin Barović. In addition to Čović's political connections through the SPS, the rapid success of his club FMP Železnik—that was about to start competing in the country's top league that season after multiple promotions—recommended him for the job.

At the time when Čović came on board to lead the federation, FR Yugoslavia national team led by Duda Ivković were the reigning European champions, having returned to international competition following a four-year exile due to the UN embargo. Ivković soon stepped down and his assistant Željko Obradović took over the national team head coaching job. The national team had a great run at the 1996 Summer Olympics in Atlanta, reaching the final against the American Dream Team composed of NBA players. In early 1997, soon after Čović's fall from grace in SPS, he was removed from the KSJ job as well.

Political offices
Preceded by Slobodanka Gruden	Mayor of Belgrade; 1994–1997	Succeeded by Zoran Đinđić
Government offices
Preceded by Zoran Đinđić	Acting Prime Minister of Serbia; 2003	Succeeded by Žarko Korać as Acting Prime Minister
Sporting positions
Preceded by Vladislav Lučić	President of KK Crvena zvezda 2011–present	Incumbent
Preceded by Ivan Todorov	Board President of SD Crvena Zvezda; 2018–present	Incumbent
Preceded by Mladen Veber	President of ABA League JTD; 2017–2018	Succeeded by Igor Dodik
Preceded by Veselin Barović	President of the Basketball Federation of Yugoslavia; 1995–1997	Succeeded by Dragoslav Ražnatović
