= Yugoslav Left =

Communist political party in Serbia

Yugoslav Left Југословенска левица Jugoslovenska levica
- Founder: Mirjana Marković
- Founded: 23 July 1994
- Dissolved: 12 April 2010
- Preceded by: League of Communists – Movement for Yugoslavia
- Headquarters: Venizelosova 31, Belgrade
- Ideology: Neocommunism; Serbian nationalism
- Political position: Far-left
- Colours: Red
- Slogan: "Jul je kul!" ("JUL is cool!")

Website
- jul.org.yu (archived)

The Yugoslav Left, (Note: Serbian: Југословенска левица, romanised: Jugoslovenska levica) also known as the Yugoslav United Left (Note: Serbian: Југословенска удружена левица, romanised: Jugoslovenska udružena levica) (JUL), was a political party in Serbia and the Federal Republic of Yugoslavia. At its peak, the party had 20 seats in Republic of Serbia's National Assembly following the 1997 general election.

== History ==
The party was formed in 1994 by merging 19 left-wing parties, led by the League of Communists – Movement for Yugoslavia (SK-PJ). It was led by Mirjana Marković, originally holding the title of President of the Directorate.

Unlike the Socialist Party of Serbia (SPS) and its ally the Democratic Party of Socialists of Montenegro (DPS) which were direct descendants of the League of Communists of Serbia and Montenegro respectively, the Yugoslav Left was an all-Yugoslav party with members from both constituent bodies.

Despite these differences, the JUL and the SPS collaborated closely. The JUL generally did not take part in elections separately. Several members of the SPS crossed the floor to JUL at some stage.

On 24 and 25 March 1995, the party held its 1st Congress at the Sava Center in Belgrade, and theatre director Ljubiša Ristić was elected president.

In 1996, the JUL joined the Left Coalition with the SPS and New Democracy. Following the 1997 election, the party had 20 MPs and representatives in various local assemblies. It held five ministerial posts in the second cabinet of Mirko Marjanović.

At the 2nd Congress in Kragujevac on 6 April 2002, Marković was elected President of the Yugoslav Left.

It had a minimal presence in Montenegrin politics. At its peak, the JUL was part of the Patriotic Coalition for Yugoslavia in the 2002 election with the People's Socialist Party of Montenegro, and the Serbian Radical Party. The coalition won less than 3% of the vote and no seats.

In the 2003 election in Serbia, the JUL received only 0.1% of the vote. The party officially ceased to exist on 12 April 2010.

== Ideology and platform ==
JUL has been described as a radical or far-left political party by various sources. It has been described as neocommunist, communist, Marxist, nationalist, and Eurosceptic. In its political platform, it supported communism and general Yugoslavism. JUL declared itself to be a party of all "left-wing and progressive forces that believed that the general interest always comes above private interest", including communists, socialists, greens, social democrats, and democratic socialists.

Political scientist Srbobran Branković stated about JUL that "its policies were totally opposite to its rhetoric." Aleksandar Vulin, a co-founder and spokesman for JUL, left the party after perceiving it to have "betrayed its programme and became a political mask for the wealthy sitting in the party", and later went on to found the Movement of Socialists.

=== Demographic characteristics ===
Its supporters believed in postmaterialism, were opposed to private ownership, and supported law and order. Its social base was mainly amongst peasants and pauperised workers, but it also had members from the so-called nouveau riche of Serbia during Milošević's terms in office, and many high-ranked civil servants and army staff. During the 1990s, opponents of Milošević's government sometimes referred to the JUL "a branch of Communist Party of China in Yugoslavia".

== Organisation ==
Mirjana Marković, one of the original co-founders, was the first president of JUL.

=== International cooperation ===
The JUL visited the gatherings of several far-left political groups in Europe and worldwide. It held ties with the Communist Party of China, the Communist Party of Cuba and the Workers' Party of Korea.

== Electoral results ==
=== Serbian parliamentary elections ===
Year	Popular vote	% of popular vote	# of seats	Seat change	Coalition	Status
1997	1,418,036	34.26%	20 / 250	▲20	Left Coalition	government
2000	14,324	0.38%	0 / 250	▼20		no seats
2003	3,771	0.09%	0 / 250	0		no seats

=== Montenegrin parliamentary elections ===
Year	Popular vote	% of popular vote	# of seats	Seat change	Coalition	Government
1996	1,668	0.55%	0 / 250	New		no seats
1998	345	0.10%	0 / 250	0		no seats
2001	190	0.05%	0 / 250	0		no seats
2002	9,911	2.84%	0 / 250	0	PKJ	no seats

== Sources ==
- Thomas, Robert (1999). Serbia Under Milošević: Politics in the 1990s. London: Hurst & Company. ISBN 1-85065-341-0.
- M. Marković interview on the party (2008) (in Serbian)
