= Democratic Alternative (Serbia) =

Former centre-left political party in Serbia

Democratic Alternative Демократска алтернатива Demokratska alternativa
- President: Nebojša Čović
- Founded: July 1997
- Dissolved: 2004
- Split from: Socialist Party of Serbia
- Merged into: Social Democratic Party
- Ideology: Social democracy; Democratic socialism
- Political position: Centre-left

The Democratic Alternative (Serbian: Демократска aлтернатива, romanized: Demokratska alternativa; abbr. ДА, DA) was a political party in Serbia. It was founded in July 1997 by secession of certain members from the ruling Socialist Party of Serbia (SPS), most notably Nebojša Čović who served as the party's president during its entire existence. It later merged into the Social Democratic Party (SDP), whom its leadership took over.

Democratic Alternative was part of the 2000-2003 Democratic Opposition of Serbia (DOS), which ran on the December 2000 parliamentary elections. It received 6 seats of the 176 won by the Democratic Opposition. Nebojša Čović became the interim Deputy Prime Minister on October 24, 2000. On 25 January 2001 the new government was elected in which he served as Deputy Prime Minister until 18 March 2004. For a short time from 12 March 2003 to 17 March 2003 Čović was the acting Premier in the wake of the assassination of Prime Minister Zoran Djindjic.

At the December 2003 parliamentary election, the party won 84,463 votes or 2.2% of the popular vote thus failed to pass the electoral threshold.

== Electoral results ==
=== Parliamentary elections ===
National Assembly of Serbia
Year	Popular vote	% of popular vote	# of seats	Seat change	Coalition	Status
1997	60,855	1.47%	1 / 250	▲1	With SSS	opposition
2000	2,404,758	64.09%	6 / 250	▲5	DOS	government
2003	84,463	2.20%	0 / 250	▼6	–	no seats
