= 2000 Serbian parliamentary election =

- 23 December 2000
- All 250 seats in the National Assembly; 126 seats needed for a majority
- Turnout: 57.62% (▲0.25pp)
Party	Leader	Vote %	Seats	+/–
DOS	Zoran Đinđić	65.69	176	+163
SPS	Slobodan Milošević	14.10	37	−48
SRS	Vojislav Šešelj	8.81	23	−59
SSJ	Borislav Pelević	5.46	14	New
This lists parties that won seats. See the complete results below.
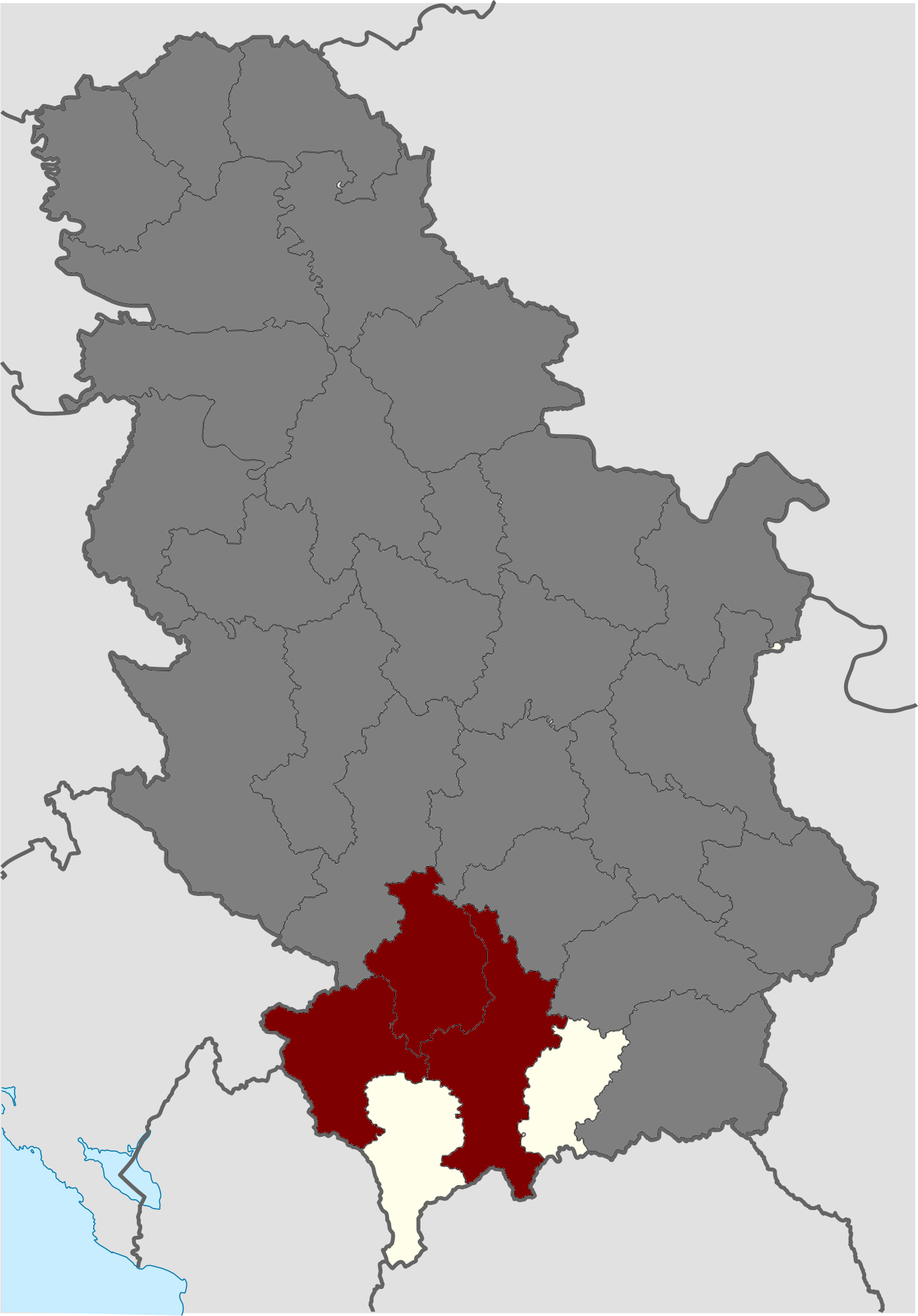

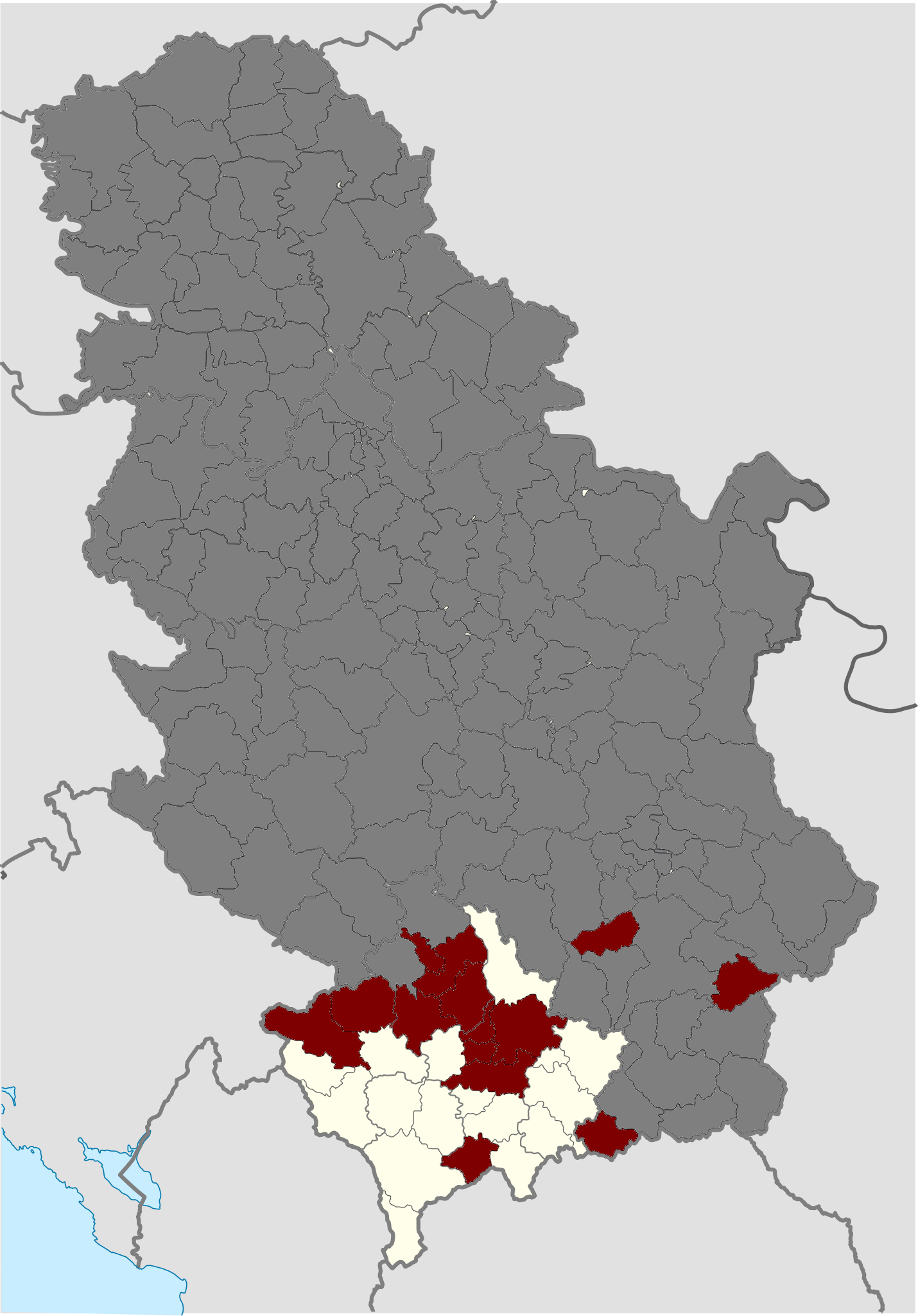
DOS SPS
Prime Minister before	Prime Minister after
Mirko Marjanović; SPS	Zoran Đinđić; DS

Parliamentary elections were held in Serbia (then a constituent republic within the Federal Republic of Yugoslavia) on 23 December 2000, to elect members of the National Assembly. They were the first free and fair parliamentary elections since the re-introduction of a multi-party system in 1990 and the overthrow of Slobodan Milošević. The result was a victory for the Democratic Opposition of Serbia, which won 176 of the 250 seats in the National Assembly.

== Electoral lists ==
Following electoral lists took part in the 2000 parliamentary election:

#	Ballot name	Ballot carrier	Main ideology	Political position
1	Serbian Radical Party – dr Vojislav Šešelj; SRS	Vojislav Šešelj	Ultranationalism	Far-right
2	"Serbian Renewal Movement – Vuk Drašković" – Vuk Drašković; SPO	Vuk Drašković	Conservatism	Centre-right
3	Socialist Party of Serbia – Slobodan Milošević; SPS	Zoran Anđelković	Populism	Left-wing
4	Democratic Opposition of Serbia – dr Vojislav Koštunica (Democratic Party, Democratic Party of Serbia, Social Democracy, Civic Alliance of Serbia, Christian Democratic Party of Serbia, New Serbia, Movement for Democratic Serbia, League of Social Democrats of Vojvodina, Reformist Democratic Party of Vojvodina, Vojvodina Coalition, Alliance of Vojvodina Hungarians, Democratic Alternative, Democratic Centre, New Democracy, Social Democratic Union, Sandžak Democratic Party, League for Šumadija, Serbian Movement of Resistance – Democratic Resistance); DS, DSS, SD, GSS, DHSS, NS, LSV, RDSV, ND, VMSZ/SVM, DA, DC, SDU, KV, SDP, Otpor, LZŠ, PDS, ASNS	Zoran Đinđić	Anti-Milošević	Big tent
5	Party of Serbian Unity – professor Borislav Pelević; SSJ, PSP, SS, PUP	Borislav Pelević	Ultranationalism	Far-right
6	Democratic Socialist Party – Milorad Vučelić; DSP	Borisav Jović	Socialism	Left-wing
7	Yugoslav Left – JUL; JUL	Ljubiša Ristić	Neocommunism	Far-left
8	Serbian Social Democratic Party – Zoran Lilić; SSDP	Zoran Lilić	Social democracy	Centre-left

== Results ==
Party	Votes	%	Seats	+/–
Democratic Opposition of Serbia (Note: Coalition of Democratic Party (45 seats), Democratic Party of Serbia (45), Social Democracy (9), New Democracy (9), Civic Alliance of Serbia (9), New Serbia (8), Democratic Christian Party of Serbia (7), League of Social Democrats of Vojvodina (6), Alliance of Vojvodina Hungarians (6), Democratic Alternative (6), Movement for Democratic Serbia (5), Democratic Centre (4), Social Democratic Union (4), Vojvodina Coalition (4), Reformists of Vojvodina (4), Sanjak Democratic Party (2), Serbian Resistance Movement (1), League for Šumadija (1), and Association of Free and Independent Trade Unions (1))	2,404,758	65.69	176	+163
Socialist Party of Serbia	516,326	14.10	37	–48
Serbian Radical Party	322,615	8.81	23	–59
Party of Serbian Unity (Note: Party list included Party of Serbian Unity (10 seats), Party of Serbian Progress (2), United Pensioners' Party (1) and Peasant Party of Serbia (1))	200,052	5.46	14	New
Serbian Renewal Movement	141,401	3.86	0	–45
Democratic Socialist Party	31,973	0.87	0	New
Serbian Social Democratic Party	29,400	0.80	0	New
Yugoslav Left	14,324	0.39	0	–20
Total	3,660,849	100.00	250	0
Valid votes	3,660,849	97.61		
Invalid/blank votes	89,800	2.39		
Total votes	3,750,649	100.00		
Registered voters/turnout	6,508,856	57.62		
Source: Republican Electoral Commission
