= Party of Serbian Unity =

Former nationalist political party in Serbia

Party of Serbian Unity Странка српског јединства Stranka srpskog jedinstva
- Abbreviation: SSJ
- President: Borislav Pelević
- Founder: Željko Ražnatović Arkan
- Founded: 1993
- Dissolved: 2007
- Preceded by: Civic Group – Željko Ražnatović Arkan
- Merged into: Serbian Radical Party
- Succeeded by: Council of Serbian Unity
- Headquarters: Belgrade (1993–1998); Jagodina (1998–2007)
- Military wing: Serb Volunteer Guard (1993–96)
- Ideology: Serbian ultranationalism; National conservatism; Serbian irredentism
- Political position: Far-right
- Colours: Grey
- National Assembly: 0 / 250

Party flag

Website
- www.strankasrpskogjedinstva.org (archived)

The Party of Serbian Unity (Serbian: Странка српског јединства, romanized: Stranka srpskog jedinstva; abbr. SSJ) was a far-right, ultranationalist political party in Serbia founded by Željko Ražnatović. After its merging into the Serbian Radical Party, the Council of Serbian Unity was the formed to be the party's successor in 2013.

== Goals ==
The key goals of the party were:

- Unity of the Serbian people
- Preserving the integrity and territory of Serbia
- Parliamentarism and Democracy
- Preservation of tradition, family and the Cyrillic script

== History ==
In 1992, a new party formed by Ražnatović called the Civic Group – Željko Ražnatović Arkan. It gained five seats in the National Assembly during the 1992 general elections. After changing to the SSJ in 1993, the party lost its five seats for failing to receive the 5% threshold. In 1998, the party moved its headquarters from Belgrade to Jagodina.

Following the assassination of Ražnatović in 2000, Borislav Pelević became president of the party. At the last legislative election in 2003, the SSJ was a part of the For National Unity alliance. However, the coalition failed to receive any seats. The SSJ merged into the Serbian Radical Party in 2007.

On 21 January 2013, the party was re-founded as the Council of Serbian Unity by Pelević, Slobodan Radosavljević and Jelena Kostić in Belgrade. The new party took part in the 2014 parliamentary election as part of the Patriotic Front coalition, but failed to reach the 5% threshold.

== Electoral results ==
=== Parliamentary ===
Year	Leader	Popular vote	% of popular vote	# of seats	Seat change	Coalition	Status
1992	Željko Ražnatović	17,352	0.39%	5 / 250	▲5	—	Opposition
1993	Željko Ražnatović	41,632	1.00%	0 / 250	▼5	—	Opposition
1997	Željko Ražnatović	5,590	0.14%	0 / 250	0	—	Opposition
2000	Borislav Pelević	200,052	5.33%	14 / 250	▲14	—	Opposition
2003	Borislav Pelević	68,537	1.82%	0 / 250	▼14	For National Unity	Opposition
2014	Borislav Pelević	4,514	0.17%	0 / 250	0	Patriotic Front	Opposition
