= Smiljan =

Smiljan may refer to:

- Smiljan (given name), a South Slavic masculine personal name
- Smiljan, Croatia, a village near Gospić
- Smilyan, a village near Smolyan, Bulgaria

== See also ==
- Smilja
- Smiljanić
- Miljan
