= Uroš Kandić =

Serbian politician (born 1979)

Uroš Kandić (Serbian Cyrillic: Урош Кандић; born 16 August 1979) is a politician in Serbia. He served in the Assembly of Vojvodina from 2012 to 2020 and is now a secretary of state in the Serbian government's ministry of Trade, Tourism, and Telecommunications. Kandić is a member of the Social Democratic Party of Serbia (SDPS).

== Early life and career ==
Kandić was born in Zrenjanin, Vojvodina, in what was then the Socialist Republic of Serbia in the Socialist Federal Republic of Yugoslavia. He holds a bachelor's degree (2004) and a master's degree (2019) from the University of Belgrade Faculty of Political Sciences and is currently pursuing a Ph.D. from the same institution. Kandić was a journalist and an editor for Glas javnosti and Kurir from 2004 to 2007.

== Politician ==
Kandić worked in public relations for SDPS leader Rasim Ljajić from 2007 to 2020. In December 2020, he was chosen as the SDPS's secretary-general.

=== Assembly of Vojvodina ===
The SDPS contested the 2012 Vojvodina provincial election in an alliance with the Socialist Party of Serbia. Kandić received the fourth position on the Socialist Party's electoral list and was elected when the list won nine proportional mandates. The election was won by the Democratic Party and its allies, and the SDPS served in opposition. In a 2015 interview, Kandić complained that there was no serious work being done in the provincial government or the assembly due to the ruling coalition's focus on keeping its majority and called for new local and provincial elections to be held as soon as possible.

The SDPS aligned itself with the Serbian Progressive Party for the 2016 provincial election, which was held under a system of full proportional representation. Kandić received the fifth position on the Progressive-led electoral list and was re-elected when the list won a majority victory with sixty-three out of 120 mandates. He served with the government's majority for the next four years and did not seek re-election in 2020.

=== Secretary of State ===
Kandić was appointed as a secretary of state in Serbia's ministry of Trade, Tourism, and Telecommunications in November 2020. The minister of the department is Tatjana Matić, the SDPS's representative in government.
