= Trade promotion =

Trade promotion may stand for:

- Trade promotion (marketing), a marketing technique aimed at increasing demand for products in retail stores
- Trade promotion (international trade), public policies aimed at increasing a country's or a company's exports
