= Smiljanić =

Smiljanić (Serbian Cyrillic: Смиљанић) is a surname found in Serbia and Croatia, derived from the given names Smilja (feminine) or Smiljan (masculine).

Notable people with the name include:

- Smiljanić family, a medieval family in Venetian Dalmatia
- Aleksandra Smiljanić, Serbian professor
- Branko Smiljanić, Serbian football manager
- Boris Smiljanić, Swiss footballer of Croatian descent
- Božidar Smiljanić (1936–2018), Yugoslav and Croatian actor
- Goran Smiljanić, Serbian footballer
- Mićo Smiljanić, Serbian footballer
- Milan Smiljanić, Serbian footballer
- Vladana Likar-Smiljanic, Serbian illustrator
- Živorad Smiljanić, Serbian politician

== See also ==
- Miljanić
