= TPF =

TPF may refer to:

== Organisations ==
- Peter O. Knight Airport, IATA airport code
- Tanzania Police Force, law enforcement agency
- Telangana Praja Front, a political party
- Theodore Payne Foundation for Wild Flowers and Native Plants
- The Perl Foundation, a non-profit organization
- Tigray Peace Force, a military force in Tigray Region of Ethiopia
- Tokyopop, a manga publishing company
- Transports publics Fribourgeois, a public transport operator in the Swiss canton of Fribourg

== Technology ==
- Docetaxel, Cisplatin, and fluorouracil, a chemotherapy regimen used in head and neck cancer
- Tapered-polymer-fiber, a type of laser
- Terrestrial Planet Finder, a proposed system of telescopes to detect extrasolar planets
- Transaction Processing Facility, an operating system by IBM

== Culture ==
- The Pop Factory, a Welsh television program
- The Proud Family, a Disney Channel Original Series
- The Purse Forum, a popular online forum dedicated to the discussion of fashion and luxury goods
- Tooting Popular Front, a fictional revolutionary organisation in Citizen Smith
- Transport Fever, a computer game

== Other ==
- National Treatment Purchase Fund, the Irish healthcare programme
- Tachi Palace Fights, an American Mixed Martial Arts promotion.
- Tactical Patrol Force, slang term for riot control squad
- Tibial plateau fracture
- Trade promotion forecasting
- Tail probability function, the probability that a random variable falls in an extreme region (the "tail") of its probability distribution (i.e. beyond some specified threshold)
