= Vladimir Homan =

Serbian politician (born 1969)

- Владимир Хоман

Member of the National Assembly of Serbia
- In office 12 February 2004 – 2007

Personal details
- Born: 1969 (age 56–57)
- Party: G17 Plus
- Occupation: politician, lawyer

Vladimir Homan (Serbian Cyrillic: Владимир Хоман; born 1969) is a politician in Serbia. He was a member of the National Assembly of Serbia from 2004 to 2007 as a member of the liberal G17 Plus party.

== Private life ==
Homan is a lawyer based in Belgrade.

== Political career ==
Homan got into politics where he first sought election to the National Assembly in the 2003 Serbian parliamentary election, where he appeared in the 240th position (out of 250) on the electoral list of G17 Plus, which won thirty-four seats. During this time, assembly mandates were awarded to candidates at the discretion of sponsoring parties or coalitions, and there was no requirement that they be assigned in numerical order; the G17 Plus list was mostly alphabetical. Homan was not initially granted a mandate but was selected to join the party's assembly delegation on 12 February 2004 as the replacement for another member. During this time, G17 Plus was a part of Serbia's coalition government under the prime ministership of Democratic Party of Serbia leader Vojislav Koštunica; Homan served as a supporter of ministry and became an official spokesperson for his party.

He was a candidate for an election to the Assembly of the City of Belgrade in the 2004 Serbian local elections, but he was ultimately not selected for a mandate.

In August 2006, Homan said that G17 Plus would withdraw from government if the Koštunica administration did not restart negotiations to join the European Union by the beginning of October (which would have required the apprehension of Ratko Mladić, at the time a war crimes suspect wanted by the International Criminal Tribunal for the former Yugoslavia). The deadline passed without the relaunch of negotiations, and the G17 Plus ministers duly submitted their resignations and left the government. New elections were held in early 2007. On this occasion, Homan received the 237th position on his party's list, which won nineteen mandates. He was not selected for a new assembly mandate but was subsequently appointed as state secretary in the ministry of telecommunications and the information society.

Homan defended G17 Plus in September 2007 against charges that it was "undemocratic" and dominated by leader Mlađan Dinkić, noting the presence of several other prominent figures in the upper echelons of the party.

In 2011, Homan was appointed as director of Emisiona tehnika i veze (ETV), a new public company entrusted with taking over Serbia's broadcast infrastructure from Radio Television of Serbia and implementing the country's digital switchover plan. He was removed from office at the instigation of party leader Mlađan Dinkić in March 2013, following media reports that he was using two official cars. Homan defended his actions, saying that the company had different vehicles designated for official travel and for day-to-day arrivals and departures. He was strongly critical of the media's coverage of the matter, saying that he had no reason to be ashamed of his actions and was leaving office with nothing to hide.

Homan subsequently affiliated with Boris Tadić's Social Democratic Party (SDS), which contested the 2016 Serbian parliamentary election in an alliance with the Liberal Democratic Party and the League of Social Democrats of Vojvodina. By this time, Serbia's electoral system had been reformed such that mandates were awarded to candidates from successful lists in numerical order. Homan received the seventy-seventh position on the list; this was indeed too low for election to be a realistic prospect, and indeed he was not elected when the list won only thirteen mandates.
