= Jagoda Lazarević =

Serbian economist and politician (born 1969)

- Јагода Лазаревић
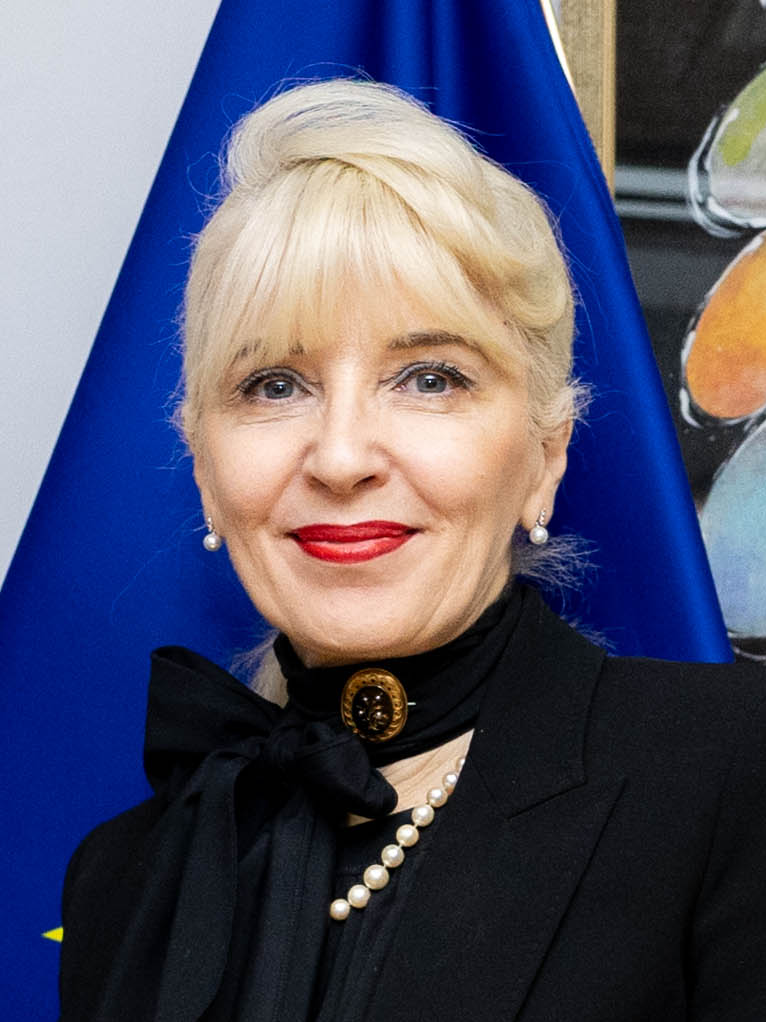
- Lazarević in 2025

Minister of Internal and Foreign Trade
- Incumbent
- Assumed office 16 April 2025
- Prime Minister: Đuro Macut
- Preceded by: Adrijana Mesarović

Personal details
- Born: 1969 (age 56–57) Belgrade, SFR Yugoslavia
- Party: Independent
- Education: Webster University

Jagoda Lazarević (Serbian: Јагода Лазаревић; born 1969) is a Serbian economist and politician who has served as the minister of internal and foreign trade of Serbia since 2025. She has continuously worked in the government of Serbia since 2008, initially in the Ministry of Economy and Regional Development, then the Ministry of Internal and Foreign Trade, and finally in the Ministry of Foreign Affairs. In April 2025, she was appointed minister in Đuro Macut's government. Under her tenure, the Law on Trade Practices for Certain Types of Products was adopted, which regulates internal trade and unfair trade practices, and the Law on Consumer Protection and Law on Trade were amended.

== Early life and education ==
Jagoda Lazarević was born in 1969 in Belgrade, SR Serbia, SFR Yugoslavia, where she attended the Eighth Belgrade Gymnasium. She then attended the Webster University in Geneva and Vienna, where she received a Bachelor of Arts in 1991. The Faculty of Economics of the University of Belgrade recognised her diploma in 1996.

== Career ==
Lazarević started her career in her family's company, where she worked from 1993 to 2008. After that, she worked in the Ministry of Economy and Regional Development as an economic assistant from 2008 to 2012 and in the Ministry of Internal and Foreign Trade (later renamed to Ministry of Trade) from 2012 to 2021. (Note: Minister of Trade during this period was Rasim Ljajić (until 2020).) In the Ministry of Trade, she was an economic advisor for cooperation with Germany, Austria, Switzerland, France, United States, Canada, and United Kingdom, and later a general advisor on economic cooperation to the minister of trade. Lazarević began working in the Ministry of Foreign Affairs in November 2021. Initially stationed in the sector for economic diplomacy, she became an acting assistant to the minister of foreign affairs for economic diplomacy in June 2022.

During her work in the government of Serbia, she was one of the Serbian representatives at Expo 2020 in Dubai from 2018 to 2021. She also led negotiations with Turkey, Eurasian Economic Union, and United Kingdom on free trade.

== Minister of Internal and Foreign Trade ==
Tomislav Momirović, the minister of internal and foreign trade, resigned in November 2024 in the aftermath of the Novi Sad railway station canopy collapse. The Večernje novosti newspaper reported in early December that Lazarević would take over the ministry. However, due to the student-led anti-corruption protests, this decision was postponed. The composition of Đuro Macut's cabinet was announced on 14 April 2025, with Lazarević mentioned as a candidate for the minister of internal and foreign trade. Lazarević was elected minister on 16 April, succeeding acting minister Adrijana Mesarović.

=== Tenure ===
Lazarević supports free trade. She has also praised the Central European Free Trade Agreement, saying that it attracts foreign investments, and China's development of technology, saying that Serbia should follow China's steps.

In an August 2025 interview with the Radio Television of Serbia, she announced that the government would continue limiting profit margins for supermarkets, describing the move as part of price reduction measures. In September, margin restriction measures came into force. The N1 television reported that the restriction measures did not end up effecting the prices of goods in supermarkets. In response, Lazarević announced that the government would amend the restriction measures. The restriction measures lasted until the end of February 2026.

Lazarević also announced that a law on prevention of unfair trade practices would be adopted before the end of 2025, a law already present in the European Union. Despite this, the government only adopted a draft version of the law in March 2026. The National Assembly of Serbia voted in favour of adopting the law a month later under the name Law on Trade Practices for Certain Types of Products, however it rejected amendments proposed by some members of the National Assembly. The law regulates internal trade as well as unfair trade practices. Transparency Serbia, an anti-corruption organisation, submitted proposals, such as criticising the exclusion of certain public sector entities from the law. The organisation also noted that the wording of the ban on commercial retaliation is vague. During the same session, the National Assembly also voted in favour of adopting changes to the Law on Consumer Protection and Law on Trade. The changes to the Law on Consumer Protection were condemned by some consumer protection associations.

In December 2025, Lazarević's ministry launched the National Platform for Monitoring Trade Chains, a platform that lets citizens monitor the prices of all major 27 supermarket chains in Serbia.

In May 2026, Lazarević visited the United Arab Emirates, where she expressed strengthening trade relations between Serbia and the UAE. In the same month, Serbia and Ukraine signed a document in which they pledged to continue working on a free trade agreement between the two countries; Lazarević also met with Chinese officials. In early June, Serbia and South Korea signed a liberalisation trade agreement on economic cooperation.

== Personal life ==
Besides her native Serbian, she speaks English, French, Italian, and German.
