= Jasna Matić =

Serbian business consultant and politician (born 1964)

- Јасна Матић
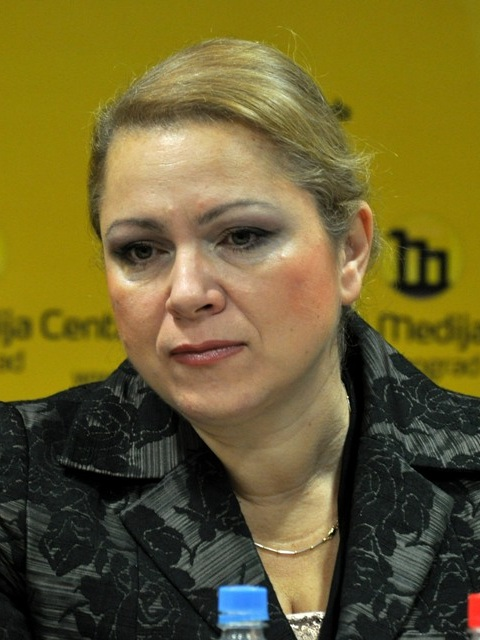

Minister of Telecommunications and Information Society
- In office 7 July 2008 – 14 March 2011
- Prime Minister: Mirko Cvetković
- Preceded by: Aleksandra Smiljanić
- Succeeded by: Predrag Marković (ministry merged into the Ministry of Culture)

Director of the Serbia Investment and Export Promotion Agency
- In office 2005–2007

Personal details
- Born: 14 January 1964 (age 62) Belgrade, SR Serbia, SFR Yugoslavia
- Party: Solidarity
- Other political affiliations: G17 Plus
- Education: University of Belgrade; Washington University in St. Louis

Jasna Matić (Serbian: Јасна Матић; born 14 January 1964) is a Serbian business consultant and politician who served as Minister of Telecommunications and Information Society from 2008 to 2011, in the cabinet of Mirko Cvetković. She previously directed the Serbia Investment and Export Promotion Agency (SIEPA). In 2013, she was charged with abuse of office over contracts concluded at SIEPA, and after a trial lasting more than a decade she was acquitted by a final judgment in 2025. She is the international secretary of Goran Ješić's Solidarity movement and a candidate on the "European Serbia" list in the 2026 Serbian parliamentary election.

== Education ==
Matić was born and raised in Belgrade. She graduated in civil engineering from the Faculty of Civil Engineering of the University of Belgrade, and in 1994 began working as a civil engineer. She earned an MBA from Washington University in St. Louis in 2001, and later completed executive education programmes in ICT, public administration, leadership and economic development at the Harvard Kennedy School.

== Career ==
From 1994 to 1999, Matić worked as a civil engineer and project coordinator at Mašinoprojekt Kopring in Belgrade. She was a World Bank consultant in Washington, D.C. from 2000 to 2001, and an adviser to the Deputy Prime Minister of Yugoslavia from 2001 to 2002. She later served as chief adviser on a USAID project for improving Serbia's competitiveness, implemented by Booz Allen Hamilton.

From 2005 to 2007, she was director of SIEPA, having previously served as its secretary. In 2007, she was appointed State Secretary at the Ministry of Economy and Regional Development, a post she held until July 2008.

=== Minister of Telecommunications ===
On 7 July 2008, Matić became Minister of Telecommunications and Information Society in the government of Mirko Cvetković, as a member of G17 Plus. She served until 14 March 2011, when her ministry was merged into the Ministry of Culture, Information and Information Society. She then became State Secretary for the Digital Agenda in that ministry. From October 2012 until the government reshuffle in September 2013, she was Special Adviser for Competitiveness and Knowledge Economy to the Minister of Finance and Economy. She also served as a commissioner of the UN Broadband Commission for Digital Development.

=== SIEPA case ===
Matić was charged by the Prosecutor's Office for Organised Crime with abuse of office for allegedly concluding fictitious authorship contracts while serving as secretary and then director of SIEPA between February 2006 and February 2007. Prosecutors alleged that the contracts were a front for paying staff salary bonuses and channelling the remaining funds into an informal agency "fund", to the detriment of the state budget. Matić and her co-defendants denied the charges.

In 2020, the Special Court in Belgrade sentenced her to seven months of house arrest, but in July 2022 the Court of Appeal overturned the conviction and ordered a retrial. In April 2023, the Higher Court in Belgrade again sentenced her to seven months of house arrest. On appeal, the Court of Appeal acquitted her by a final judgment in April 2025, finding insufficient evidence that she had committed the offences and that any suspicion "remained at the level of indications".

=== Return to politics ===
Matić became international secretary of Goran Ješić's Solidarity civic movement. In the 2026 Serbian parliamentary election, she was among the first ten candidates on the "European Serbia" list of the Party of Freedom and Justice, Serbia Centre and Solidarity, headed by Dragan Đilas, Marinika Tepić and Zdravko Ponoš.

== Personal life ==
Besides Serbian, Matić speaks English and has a working knowledge of Italian and German.

Political offices
Preceded by Aleksandra Smiljanić	Minister of Telecommunications and Information Society; 2008–2011	Succeeded by Predrag Marković (ministry merged into the Ministry of Culture)
