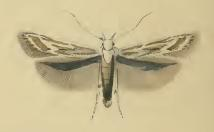

Scientific classification
- Kingdom: Animalia
- Phylum: Arthropoda
- Clade: Pancrustacea
- Class: Insecta
- Order: Lepidoptera
- Family: Gelechiidae
- Genus: Ptocheuusa
- Species: P. inopella

Binomial name
- Ptocheuusa inopella (Zeller, 1839)

Synonyms
- Gelechia inopella Zeller, 1839; Ptocheuusa amesella Chrétien, 1907

= Ptocheuusa inopella =

Species of moth

Ptocheuusa inopella is a moth of the family Gelechiidae. It is found from France to Russia and from Denmark and Sweden to Austria and Hungary. It has also been recorded from Greece.

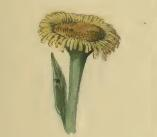
A flower of Inula dysenterica with some florets disturbed by larva

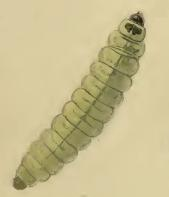
Larva

The wingspan is 8–9 mm. Adults are on wing from June and July to the beginning of August.

The larvae feed on Helichrysum arenarium species (including Helichrysum arenarium) and Inula dysenterica. They feed on the flowers of their host plant. Larvae can be found in August.
