= Mile Ilić (politician) =

Serbian politician (born 1954)

Member of the National Assembly
- In office 2008–2012
- In office 1990–1992

Personal details
- Born: 27 July 1954 (age 72) Jovac, PR Serbia, Yugoslavia
- Party: SPS (since 1990)
- Education: University of Niš; University of Kragujevac (PhD)

Mile Ilić (Serbian Cyrillic: Миле Илић; born 27 July 1954) is a politician in Serbia. He was the leader of the local organization of the Socialist Party of Serbia (SPS) in Niš in the early 1990s, during which time he also served in the assemblies of Serbia and Yugoslavia. He fell from power during the 1996–1997 protests in Serbia and largely remained out of the public eye in the decade that followed. Ilić returned to political life in the mid-2000s and served as president of the Niš city assembly from 2008 to 2016. He is a member of the Socialist Party of Serbia (Socijalistička partija Srbije, SPS) and continues to serve in the city assembly as of 2021.

== Early life and private career ==
Ilić was born in the village of Jovac in Vladičin Han, in what was then the People's Republic of Serbia in the Federal People's Republic of Yugoslavia. He graduated from the University of Niš Faculty of Law, where he subsequently earned a master's degree. In 1999, during his time out of politics, he received a Ph.D. from the University of Kragujevac. He became an associate professor at the University of Priština in North Mitrovica in the same year and later served as head of the university's Department of Public Law. In 2008, he was hired as a full professor at the University of Niš. His academic focus is in the field of local self-government, and he has published widely in the field.

Before running for political office himself, Ilić worked as a political advisor in the inter-municipal regional community of Niš. He was also active with the Socialist Union of Working People at the local, republican, and federal levels during the time of the Socialist Federal Republic of Yugoslavia.

== Politician ==
=== Parliamentarian (1991–96) ===
Ilić was elected to the National Assembly of Serbia in the 1990 Serbian parliamentary election, the first to be held after the re-introduction of multi-party politics. The SPS won a majority victory in the election, and Ilić served as a government supporter. When the Socialist Federal Republic of Yugoslavia was restructured as the Federal Republic of Yugoslavia in 1992, Ilić was also chosen as one of Serbia's first delegates to the Yugoslavian Chamber of Republics in the federal entity's new parliament.

He did not seek re-election to the national assembly in late 1992 but instead ran for the Yugoslavian Chamber of Citizens in the December 1992 Yugoslavian federal election, appearing in the lead position on the Socialist Party's electoral list in the Niš division. He was elected when the list won five mandates. The election was won by the SPS and its Montenegrin allies, and Ilić again served as a government supporter.

Ilić led the SPS's list for the smaller, redistributed Niš division in the 1996 Yugoslavian parliamentary election and was re-elected when the list won two mandates.

By his own acknowledgement, Ilić was associated with the SPS's hardline wing. In early 1996, following the signing of the Dayton Accords, he nominated Serbian president Slobodan Milošević for the Nobel Peace Prize.

Ilić was often portrayed as a powerful political boss in Niš during these years, and he was sometimes accused of creating a cult of personality around himself through his control of the local media. American journalist Chris Hedges, among others, depicted Ilić as having become a "widely unpopular" figure by late 1996 due to corruption and his association with Milošević.

=== Fall from power (1996–97) ===
The SPS was widely accused of attempting to rig the 1996 local elections in Niš. During the campaign, Ilić hired security guards from the Serbian Kick-Boxing Association; these guards were accused of intimidating opposition politicians and their supporters. Even the Yugoslav Left (Jugoslovenska Levica, JUL), a party broadly aligned with the SPS, accused the local administration of abusing the democratic procedure. When the opposition Zajedno coalition won the election, the city's election commission refused to recognize the results and awarded the victory to the SPS. This was one of the pivotal events in prompting the 1996–1997 protests in Serbia, which threatened the SPS's overall hold on power. Ilić disappeared from public view during the protests and resigned as leader of the Niš SPS on 4 December 1996, amid speculation that he was being scapegoated for the party's failures. In January 1997, the Serbian government recognized the opposition's victory in Niš; Ilić was expelled from the SPS at around the same time and withdrew from political life in the city.

While online sources do not confirm this point, it may be reasonably inferred that Ilić also resigned his seat in the Yugoslavian assembly during this time (or, alternately, that he did not take his mandate following the 1996 election).

Ilić's membership in the SPS was restored in November 2000, after the fall of Milošević's administration. He welcomed the decision, saying, "I have always been a socialist and a leftist, and I never stopped being that, even when I was unjustly expelled." He did not initially return to active political life after returning to the party.

=== Political comeback (2006–present) ===
==== Return to the national assembly (2008–12) ====
Ilić returned to politics in the mid-2000s, receiving the twenty-third position on SPS's electoral list in the 2007 Serbian parliamentary election. By this time, he was aligned with the reformist tendency in the party. Interviewed by Politika about the events of 1996, he was quoted as saying, "Time has shown that I was right and that nothing attributed to me is true, so this is a kind of political rehabilitation, which would be said, at a high level." The SPS won sixteen seats in the election, and Ilić was not on this occasion given a mandate. (From 2000 to 2011, Serbian parliamentary mandates were awarded to sponsoring parties or coalitions rather than to individual candidates, and it was common practice for mandates to be awarded out of numerical order. Ilić could have been awarded a seat in the assembly notwithstanding his position on the list, although in fact he was not. The entire country was counted as a single electoral division by this time.)

Ilić again appeared on the SPS's list in the 2008 parliamentary election. The list won twenty seats, and he was included in his party's delegation, returning to the national assembly after a fifteen-year absence. The overall results of the election were initially inconclusive, but the SPS eventually joined a coalition government led by the For a European Serbia coalition, which was dominated by the Democratic Party (Demokratska stranka, DS). Ilić again served as a government supporter in the term that followed and did not seek re-election at the republic level in 2012.

==== Member of the Niš city assembly (2008–present) ====
Ilić led the SPS's list for Niš in the 2008 Serbian local elections and took a mandate after the list won seven seats. As at the republic level, the For a European Serbia alliance formed a coalition government with the SPS, and Ilić became president of the assembly.

Serbia's electoral laws were reformed in 2011, such that mandates were awarded in numerical order to candidates on successful lists. Ilić again led the SPS's list in the 2012 local elections and was re-elected when the list won ten mandates. The Socialists formed a new coalition government with the Serbian Progressive Party (Srpska napredna stranka, SNS), and Ilić was again confirmed as assembly president after the election, serving in this role for another four years.

Ilić was again elected to the Niš city assembly in the 2016 local elections, in which the SPS list won eight mandates. The SNS–SPS alliance remained in power in Niš, although with the SNS in a strengthened position; Ilić was reassigned as assembly vice-president and served in this role for the next four years. He led the SPS list to six seats in the 2020 local elections and continues to lead the party's group in the local assembly as of 2021.

== Electoral record ==
=== National Assembly of Serbia ===
1990 Serbian parliamentary election: Niš Division 2
Candidate	Party
Dr. Zoran Aranđelović	Party of Independent Democrats of Serbia
Ivan Loki Dinčić	Citizens' Group
Toplica Đorđević	Serbian Renewal Movement
Dr. Rajko Đurić	Democratic Party
Dr. Živorad Zlatković	Party of Independent Businessmen and Peasants
Mile Ilić (***WINNER***)	Socialist Party of Serbia
Zoran Krasić	People's Radical Party
Dr. Petko Stojanović	Citizens' Group
Svetomir Stošić	Yugoslav Socialist Democratic Party
Total
