= Trade promotion (international trade) =

Trade promotion (sometimes referred to as export promotion) is an umbrella term for economic policies, development interventions and private initiatives aimed at improving the trade performance of an economic area. Such an economic area can include just one country, a region within a country, or a group of countries involved in an economic trade area. Specific industries may be targeted. Improvement is mainly sought by increasing exports both in absolute terms and relative to imports. When specific industries are targeted, trade promotion policies tend to target industries that have a comparative advantage over their foreign competitors. Trade promotion can also include expanding the supply of key inputs in a country's strongest industries, via import expansion. If successful, such a tactic would lead to pro-trade biased growth.

As an economic policy with the ultimate goal of increasing domestic welfare, trade promotion comprises a large set of policy instruments. One notable tactic is the provision of trade intelligence to domestic enterprises in order to reduce transaction costs and provide them with a competitive advantage vis-à-vis foreign companies. Many countries all over the world have set up special agencies, most of them in the public domain, to implement trade promotion policies and provide support services to domestic enterprises.

Some international organizations provide assistance to so-called developing countries to help them promote their exports, most prominently the International Trade Centre in Geneva, which is a subsidiary of the World Trade Organization and the United Nations with a mandate to providing trade-related technical assistance to those countries.

== Economic theory of trade promotion ==
The rationale for public trade promotion measures is based on the observation of market failures and the idea of creating positive externalities. All economic transaction imply so-called transaction costs. In international trade, some transaction costs are significantly higher than when carrying out business in the domestic market. For example, information about foreign consumers is less readily available, foreign jurisdictions might apply different product standards, which can pose technical barriers to trade, or transporting goods becomes more expensive and hazardous with increasing distance.

== "New" new trade theory ==
Since the mid-2000s, research in a relatively new branch of trade theory, which emphasizes the role of firm-level heterogeneity in explaining trade, has provided first insights about how export promotion affects individual enterprises. Using panel data for Chile and the USA, Alvarez (2004) and Bernard and Jensen (2004), respectively, find mostly insignificant firm responses to different export promotion schemes. In Alvarez (2004), only market studies and arranged meetings with experts, authorities and clients had a statistically significant effect. Görg et al. (2008), however, find that matching grant schemes for Irish enterprises helps to increase exports by existing exporters without stimulating the entry of new firms into export markets.

== Export promotion agencies ==
Examples of export promotion agencies include the Export Promotion Council of Kenya (EPC), the Serbia Investment and Export Promotion Agency and India's Engineering Exports Promotion Council.

== See also ==
- Trade promotion (marketing)
- Enhanced integrated framework
- International Trade Centre
- International Trade
- Import substitution industrialization
- Immiserizing growth
- New trade theory
- "New" new trade theory
