= Zoran Krasić =

Serbian politician (1956–2018)

- Зоран Красић
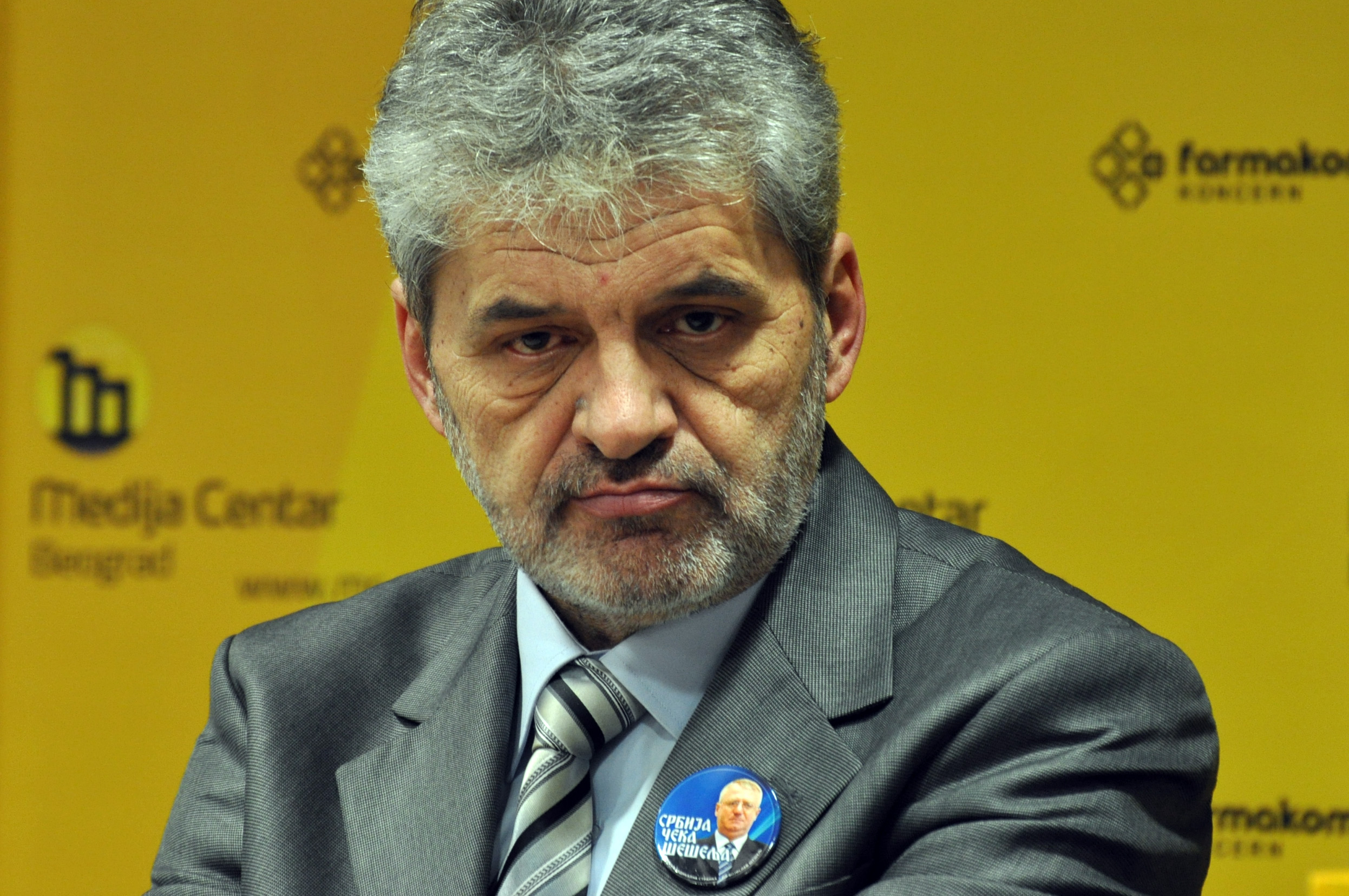
- Krasić in 2012

Minister of Trade in the Government of Serbia
- In office 24 March 1998 – 24 October 2000
- Preceded by: Srđan Nikolić
- Succeeded by: Milorad Mišković

Member of the National Assembly of the Republic of Serbia
- In office 3 June 2016 – 12 April 2018
- In office 18 March 2003 – 31 May 2012

Member of the Chamber of Citizens in the Assembly of the Federal Republic of Yugoslavia
- In office 3 February 1993 – 7 October 2000

Personal details
- Born: 11 March 1956 Belgrade, FPR Yugoslavia
- Died: 12 April 2018 (aged 62) Belgrade, Serbia
- Party: NRS (1990–91); SRS (1991–2018)
- Occupation: Politician

Zoran Krasić (Serbian Cyrillic: Зоран Красић; 11 March 1956 – 12 April 2018) was a Serbian politician. He served several terms in the parliaments of Yugoslavia and Serbia and was Serbia's trade minister from 1998 to 2000. Krasić was a member of the far-right Serbian Radical Party (SRS).

== Early life and career ==
Krasić was born in Belgrade, in what was then the People's Republic of Serbia in the Federal People's Republic of Yugoslavia. He graduated from the University of Niš Faculty of Law and practised law in the city. Krasić moved back to Belgrade during his time in public office.

== Politician ==
Krasić ran in the 1990 Serbian parliamentary election as a candidate of the People's Radical Party (NRS) in Niš's second division. He was not successful; the winning candidate was Mile Ilić of the Socialist Party of Serbia (SPS). The following year, the People's Radical Party merged with Vojislav Šešelj's Serbian Chetnik Movement to form the Serbian Radical Party, and Krasić joined the new organization. He led the SRS's board in Niš in the 1990s and was a vice-president on its national executive.

=== Member of the Federal Assembly of Yugoslavia (1992–2000) ===
Krasić was elected to the Yugoslavian parliament's Chamber of Citizens in the December 1992 parliamentary election when the Radical Party won two seats in the Niš division. The Socialist Party and its Montenegrin allies won the election, and the Radical Party served in opposition. Krasić emerged as a prominent spokesperson for his party in this period. He led the Radical Party's electoral list for the smaller, redistributed Niś constituency in the 1996 Yugoslavian election and was re-elected when the party won a single mandate in the division. The Socialist Party and its Montenegrin allies again won the election, and the SRS initially remained in opposition.

Krasić also ran for the Niš city assembly in the 1996 Serbian local elections, which were held concurrently with the Yugoslavian election, and was the Radical Party's nominee for mayor. (Note: Serbian mayors were not directly elected in 1996; Krasić was technically the SRS's presumptive nominee for mayor in the event that the party won the election.) He was not successful; the party won only one assembly seat, and Krasić was personally defeated. The Zajedno (English: "Together") coalition won a majority victory in Niš, but the Serbian government, dominated by the Socialist Party, did not initially recognize the result. Krasić took part in opposition protests and said that the Radical Party would work to prevent the functioning of the local assembly. The controversy over the Niš elections was one of the principal causes of the 1996–1997 protests in Serbia. Ultimately, the Serbian government recognized the victory of Zajedno in January 1997.

=== Serbian cabinet minister (1998–2000) ===
The Radical Party joined the government of Serbia on 24 March 1998 as part of a coalition government led by the Socialist Party, and Krasić was named as trade minister in the cabinet of Serbian prime minister Mirko Marjanović. One month after his appointment, he announced that the government would pursue charges against business leaders who had created "false shortages" and raised their prices following a recent currency devaluation. He later said that his ministry's priority would be to fight against monopolies that had created artificial shortages, introduced price pressures, and imported unneeded raw materials.

After the start of the North Atlantic Treaty Organization (NATO)'s 1999 bombing of Yugoslavia, Krasić said that earnings and pensions would be equalized due to wartime conditions and that the gap between the highest and lowest salaries would be reduced to permit a more equal provision of basic necessities. He also said that the government would try to avoid the use of food coupons. In early May 1999, he announced that Serbia was facing a shortage of gasoline and oil derivatives due to NATO bombing raids on country's oil-refining facilities; he added that the country was facing a shortage of cigarettes due to the Niš Tobacco Industry only working a few hours a day, when the air-raid sirens were not in force. These points notwithstanding, he said on 19 May that market supplies of agricultural foodstuffs and related products were generally satisfactory given the conditions of war.

The bombing campaign ended in June 1999, and NATO forces entered Kosovo shortly thereafter. The Radical Party threatened to withdraw from government when this occurred; Krasić was quoted as saying, "We have been deceived by our coalition partners. [...] Where there are no Yugoslav troops, and no Serb police [in Kosovo], there is no state sovereignty." Ultimately, the party remained in government.

In late 1999, Krasić announced that Serbia would use "subsidies, bonuses, allowances, tax and contribution relief, and other means" to avoid price increases in staple goods. Bosnian Serb Television subsequently reported in February 2000 that his ministry had unexpectedly blocked food exports from Yugoslavia to the Republika Srpska.

SPS leader Slobodan Milošević was defeated in the 2000 Yugoslavian presidential election and subsequently fell from power on 5 October 2000, a watershed moment in Serbian politics. Krasić was defeated in his bid for re-election to the Chamber of Citizens in the concurrent Yugoslavian parliamentary election. (He did not seek re-election in Niš but instead received the second position on the SRS list for the Belgrade division of Čukarica; the Radical Party did not win any seats in the division.) The Serbian government fell after Milošević's defeat in the Yugoslavian vote, and Krasić's ministerial term ended on 24 October 2000.

=== Member of the National Assembly of Serbia ===
==== First three terms (2003–08) ====
Serbia held a new parliamentary election in December 2000. For this vote, the entire country was for the first time counted as a single electoral division. Krasić received the twenty-fourth position on the Radical Party's list; the party won twenty-three seats, and he was not initially included in its assembly delegation. (From 2000 to 2011, Serbian parliamentary mandates were awarded to sponsoring parties or coalitions rather than to individual candidates, and it was common practice for mandates to be assigned out of numerical order. Krasić could have been given a seat when the new assembly convened in January 2001 despite his list position, though in the event he was not.) He was, however, awarded a mandate on 18 March 2003 as a replacement for party leader Vojislav Šešelj, who had resigned to face war crimes charges at the International Criminal Tribunal for the Former Yugoslavia (ICTY) in The Hague. The Democratic Opposition of Serbia (DOS) won a landslide victory in the 2000 election, and the Radicals served in opposition.

Krasić appeared in the thirty-eighth position on the Radical Party's list in the 2003 parliamentary election and was included in its delegation when the list won eighty-two seats. Although the Radicals were the largest party in the new assembly, they fell well short of a majority and ultimately continued to serve in opposition. In his second term, Krasić was deputy chair of the assembly's legislative committee and a member of the committee on constitutional affairs and the committee on justice and administration.

In June 2006, Ivana Dulić-Marković, an ethnic Croat from the G17 Plus party, was appointed as a deputy prime minister in Vojislav Koštunica's government. When the appointment was announced in parliament, Krasić accused Dulić-Marković's family of having been Ustaše during World War II and made the disparaging comment, "Take your deputy prime minister Dulić-Marković and let her bring her Ustaše to be her advisers [...] That is the same woman who has said that [Milošević's] government slaughtered and transported people in bloody containers, etc..." Krasić's comments were widely condemned. Serbian president Boris Tadić and others described the remarks as hate speech that targeted the minister because of her ethnic origins, while G17 Plus sought to ban the Radical Party over the incident. Aleksandar Vučić, at the time secretary-general of the SRS, responded that Krasić had referred to Ustaše in an ideological rather than an ethnic sense and rejected calls for an apology. The national assembly ultimately determined that Krasić's remarks did not violate its rules of procedure. Shortly after the incident, the Radical Party nominated Krasić as one of its candidates for Serbia's delegation to the Parliamentary Assembly of the Organization for Security and Co-operation in Europe (OSCE PA), a decision that was strongly opposed by the governing parties.

Krasić received the tenth position on the SRS's list in the 2007 parliamentary election and was given a mandate for a third term when the party won eighty-one seats. The Radicals once again won the greatest number of seats in the assembly, fell short of a majority, and served in opposition. Krasić held the same committee memberships as in the previous parliament, except that he was by this time no longer deputy chair of the legislative committee.

==== Fourth term (2008–12) ====
Krasić appeared in the eleventh position on the Radical Party's list in the 2008 parliamentary election and was again included in the party's delegation when the list won seventy-eight seats. The overall results of this election were inconclusive, but the For a European Serbia (ZES) alliance eventually formed a coalition government with the Socialist Party, and the Radicals again served in opposition. Krasić also led the SRS list for the Rakovica municipal assembly in the concurrent 2008 local elections; the list won twenty-five seats, but he chose not to serve at the municipal level. He was part of Šešelj's legal defence team during this time, and in July 2008 he spoke at a rally opposing the extradition of former Bosnian Serb political leader Radovan Karadžić to The Hague.

The Radical Party experienced a serious split in late 2008, with several members joining the more moderate Serbian Progressive Party (SNS) under the leadership of Tomislav Nikolić and Aleksandar Vučić. Krasić remained with the Radicals and was a prominent member of the party's hardline, pro-Šešelj faction. He was named chair of the parliamentary finance committee in January 2009, during a purge of Radicals-turned-Progressives from leadership positions. At around the same time, he was chosen as leader of Šešelj's legal defence team. When Šešelj experienced serious health issues in early 2012, Krasić urged the tribunal to end what he described as its "torture" of the SRS leader and permit him to return to Serbia.

In 2010, the Radical Party introduced a draft resolution recognizing and condemning the Armenian genocide committed by the Ottoman Empire. At a press conference to announce the legislation, Krasić said, "Under pressure by the international community, some parties are trying to push through the Serbian parliament a resolution on Srebrenica, which would include the term genocide, although what happened in Srebrenica cannot be compared to the plight of Armenians or of over one million people in Rwanda."

In addition to chairing the finance committee, Krasić continued to serve on the justice and constitutional affairs committees, was part of Serbia's delegation to the NATO Parliamentary Assembly (where Serbia has observer status), and was a member of Serbia's parliamentary friendship group with Israel.

==== Out of parliament (2012–16) ====
Serbia's electoral system was reformed in 2011, such that all parliamentary mandates were awarded in numerical order to candidates on successful lists. Krasić received the fourth position on the Radical Party's list in the 2012 parliamentary election. He also appeared in the second position on its list for the Belgrade city assembly and the lead position on its list for the Rakovica municipal assembly in the concurrent 2012 local elections. At all three levels, the party failed to cross the five per cent electoral threshold for assembly representation.

He was given the fifth position on the SRS list for the 2014 parliamentary election, in which the party once again failed to cross the threshold. During the buildup to the 2014 campaign, some pundits had discussed the prospect of an alliance between the Radical Party and other right-wing, nationalist parties such as the Democratic Party of Serbia (DSS) and Dveri. Krasić rejected this speculation, saying that these parties were compromised by their willingness to co-operate with the European Union and NATO.

==== Return to parliament (2016–18) ====
The Radicals returned to parliament in the 2016 election, winning twenty-two mandates. Krasić, who again received the fifth position on the party's list, was elected to a fifth term. The SNS and its allies won the election, and the Radicals again served in opposition. Krasić also led the SRS's list in Rakovica for the concurrent 2016 local elections and was this time elected when the list won five mandates. He resigned his seat in the local assembly on 15 September 2016.

At the time of his death, Krasić was a member of the finance committee (Note: Formally known as the Committee on Finance, State Budget, and Control of Public Spending.) and the committee on constitutional and legislative issues, as well as a member of Serbia's parliamentary friendship groups with Iran and Israel.

== Death ==
Krasić died on 12 April 2018 after a short illness.

== Electoral record ==
=== National Assembly of Serbia ===
1990 Serbian parliamentary election: Niš Division 2
Candidate	Party
Dr. Zoran Aranđelović	Party of Independent Democrats of Serbia
Ivan Loki Dinčić	Citizens' Group
Toplica Đorđević	Serbian Renewal Movement
Dr. Rajko Đurić	Democratic Party
Dr. Živorad Zlatković	Party of Independent Businessmen and Peasants
Mile Ilić (***WINNER***)	Socialist Party of Serbia
Zoran Krasić	People's Radical Party
Dr. Petko Stojanović	Citizens' Group
Svetomir Stošić	Yugoslav Socialist Democratic Party
Total
