= Ptocheuusa dresnayella =

Scientific classification
- Domain: Eukaryota
- Kingdom: Animalia
- Phylum: Arthropoda
- Class: Insecta
- Order: Lepidoptera
- Family: Gelechiidae
- Genus: Ptocheuusa
- Species: P. dresnayella

Binomial name
- Ptocheuusa dresnayella D. Lucas, 1945

Species of moth

Ptocheuusa dresnayella is a moth of the family Gelechiidae. It was described by Daniel Lucas in 1945. It is found in Tunisia.
