= Ptocheuusa scholastica =

Scientific classification
- Domain: Eukaryota
- Kingdom: Animalia
- Phylum: Arthropoda
- Class: Insecta
- Order: Lepidoptera
- Family: Gelechiidae
- Genus: Ptocheuusa
- Species: P. scholastica

Binomial name
- Ptocheuusa scholastica (Walsingham, 1903)

Synonyms
- Apodia scholastica Walsingham, 1903

Species of moth

Ptocheuusa scholastica is a moth of the family Gelechiidae. It was described by Thomas de Grey, 6th Baron Walsingham in 1903. It is found in Spain.

The wingspan is 11–12 mm. The forewings are whitish, with a greyish tinge, sprinkled along the costal half with scattered fuscous scaling, a small elongate blackish dot beneath the costa at about one-third. Along the basal two-thirds of the fold, commencing near the base, runs a chestnut-brown streak edged with black, followed by an elongate black spot between the fold and the cell at about half the wing-length, this again is followed by an elongate rich chestnut-brown patch parallel to the termen, narrowly outlined with black at its outer edge. In the dirty greyish white cilia are four or five patches of blackish scales on their basal half, the two below the apex produced more faintly outward through the outer half of the cilia. The hindwings are greyish.
