= Ptocheuusa minimella =

Scientific classification
- Domain: Eukaryota
- Kingdom: Animalia
- Phylum: Arthropoda
- Class: Insecta
- Order: Lepidoptera
- Family: Gelechiidae
- Genus: Ptocheuusa
- Species: P. minimella

Binomial name
- Ptocheuusa minimella (Rebel, 1936)

Synonyms
- Xystophora minimella Rebel, 1936

Species of moth

Ptocheuusa minimella is a moth of the family Gelechiidae. It was described by Hans Rebel in 1936. It is found in Italy, Croatia and on Sardinia and Cyprus.
