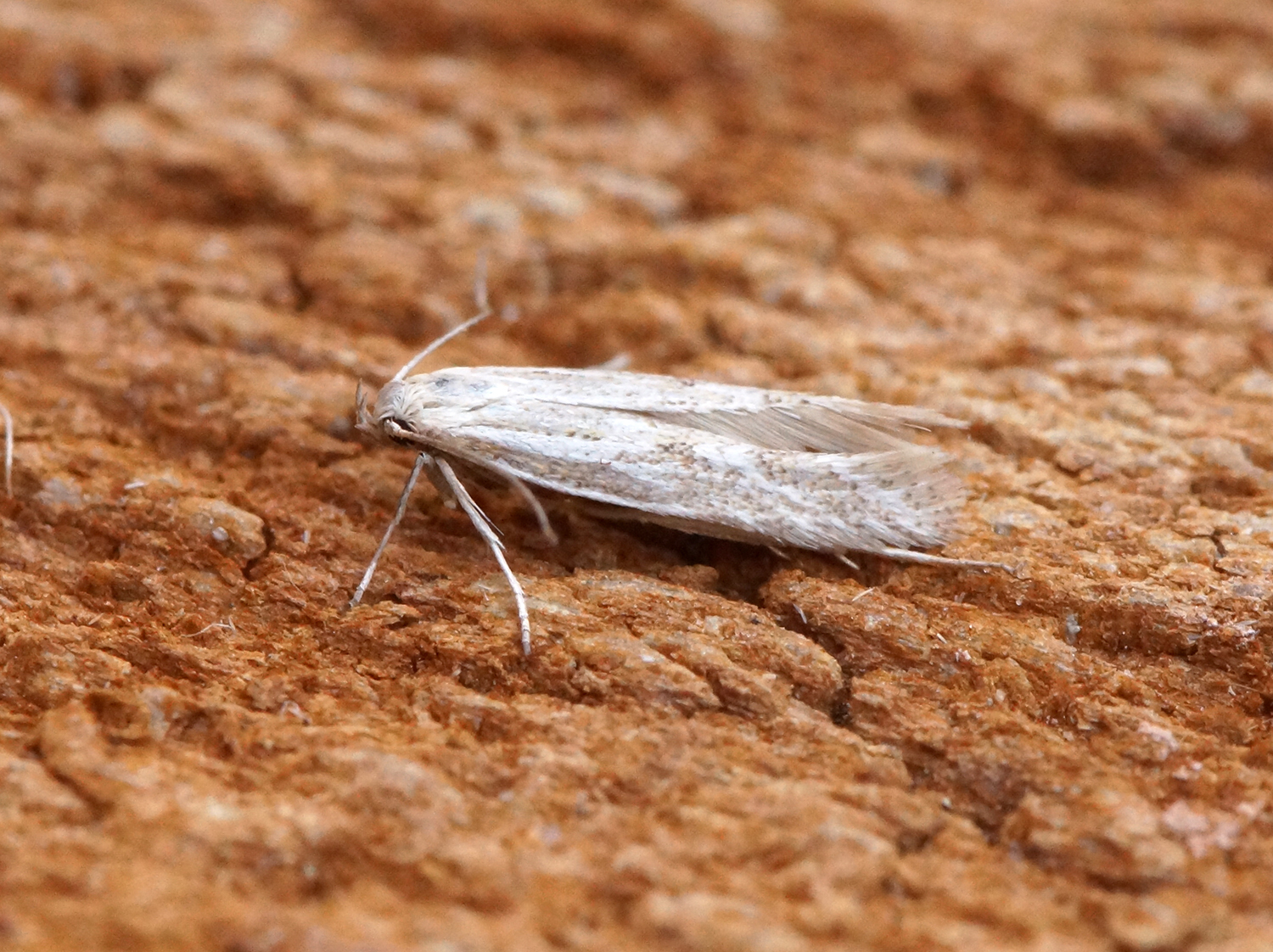
- Imago in Bramfield Woods, Hertfordshire, England

Scientific classification
- Kingdom: Animalia
- Phylum: Arthropoda
- Clade: Pancrustacea
- Class: Insecta
- Order: Lepidoptera
- Family: Gelechiidae
- Genus: Ptocheuusa
- Species: P. paupella

Binomial name
- Ptocheuusa paupella (Zeller, 1847)

Synonyms
- List: Gelechia paupella Zeller, 1847; Aphelosetia inulella Curtis, 1850; Apatetris leucoglypta Meyrick, 1918

= Ptocheuusa paupella =

Species of moth

Ptocheuusa paupella, the light fleabane neb, is a moth of the family Gelechiidae, first described by the German entomologist, Philipp Christoph Zeller in 1847, from a specimen found in Syracuse, Sicily. It is found in Asia, Europe and North Africa.

== Life cycle ==
Imago

The wingspan is 10–12 mm. The ground colour is buff, streaked with whitish and with darker speckling. The forewings are light ochreous-yellow, with some black scales mostly arranged in longitudinal rows; margins, a median longitudinal streak from base to middle, an indistinct inwardly oblique slender fascia before middle and another at 3/4, and sometimes two or three faint longitudinal lines in disc posteriorly white. Hindwings are pale grey. The larva is pale yellowish; head and two spots on 2 dark fuscous, head pale brown.

Adults are on wing in June and again from August to September.

Ovum

Eggs are laid on common fleabane (Pulicaria dysenterica), black knapweed (Centaurea nigra), mints (Mentha species) and golden samphire (Inula crithmoides).

Larva

Larvae feed on the achenes in the flower heads of the food plant, with a raised section of florets showing the presence a larva. In Britain and Ireland the larvae are found from June to August, again in September and October and overwinter fully fed until May when they form a pupa.

Pupa

In Great Britain and Ireland, larvae can be found in May and June and again in August and September. They pupate in a tough, silk cocoon, mixed with frass, seeds and chewed material, and is firmly attached to the upper side of the receptacle on the flowerhead; occasionally piercing the flowerhead so that the cocoon is partly below the receptacle.

== Distribution ==
It is found from western and southern Europe to the Ural Mountains, North Africa, Asia Minor and India.
