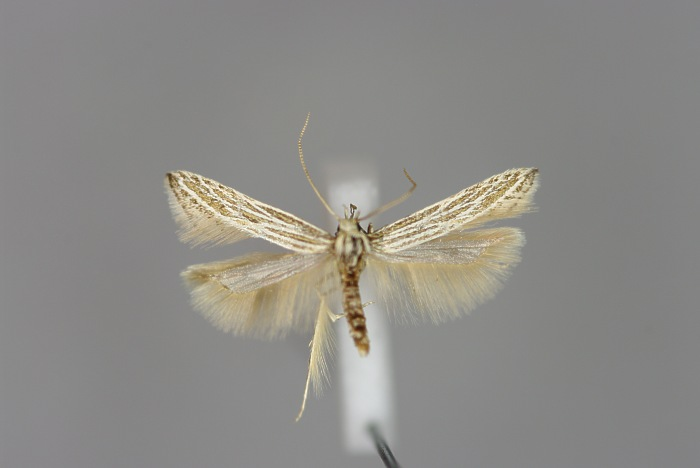

Scientific classification
- Domain: Eukaryota
- Kingdom: Animalia
- Phylum: Arthropoda
- Class: Insecta
- Order: Lepidoptera
- Family: Gelechiidae
- Genus: Ptocheuusa
- Species: P. abnormella

Binomial name
- Ptocheuusa abnormella (Herrich-Schäffer, 1854)

Synonyms
- Anacampsis abnormella Herrich-Schäffer, 1854

= Ptocheuusa abnormella =

Species of moth

Ptocheuusa abnormella is a moth of the family Gelechiidae. It is found from central and southern Europe to the Ural Mountains.

The wingspan is 13–15 mm. Adults are on wing in June and July.

The larvae feed on the inflorescence of Inula ensifolia.
