= Ptocheuusa sublutella =

Scientific classification
- Domain: Eukaryota
- Kingdom: Animalia
- Phylum: Arthropoda
- Class: Insecta
- Order: Lepidoptera
- Family: Gelechiidae
- Genus: Ptocheuusa
- Species: P. sublutella

Binomial name
- Ptocheuusa sublutella Christoph, 1873

Species of moth

Ptocheuusa sublutella is a moth of the family Gelechiidae. It was described by Hugo Theodor Christoph in 1873. It is found in southern European Russia.

The length of the forewings is about 5 mm. The forewings are ochreous yellow with white veins and markings and some fine dispersed black atoms. The hindwings are shining grey.
