= Ptocheuusa asterisci =

Scientific classification
- Domain: Eukaryota
- Kingdom: Animalia
- Phylum: Arthropoda
- Class: Insecta
- Order: Lepidoptera
- Family: Gelechiidae
- Genus: Ptocheuusa
- Species: P. asterisci

Binomial name
- Ptocheuusa asterisci (Walsingham, 1903)

Synonyms
- Apodia asterisci Walsingham, 1903

Species of moth

Ptocheuusa asterisci is a moth of the family Gelechiidae. It was described by Thomas de Grey, 6th Baron Walsingham, in 1903. It is found in Spain.

The wingspan is 11–14 mm. The forewings are whitish cinereous, longitudinally shaded with brownish fuscous, intermixed with pale chestnut-brown and with a broadish shade which extends from the base along the costa nearly to the apex, a shorter shade along the disc, and a third, still shorter, beneath it, extending somewhat beyond the middle of the fold, these are all more or less mixed with chestnut-brown, the dorsum is sprinkled with brownish fuscous, and a chestnut-brown patch runs parallel with the termen to the apex. The hindwings are greyish.

The larvae feed in the dry seed heads of Asteriscus mauretanica.
