= Toplica Đorđević =

Serbian politician (born 1954)

Toplica Đorđević (Serbian Cyrillic: Топлица Ђорђевић; born 13 January 1954) is a former politician in Serbia. He was a leading figure in the city government of Niš in the early 2000s, and has also served in the assemblies of Serbia, the Federal Republic of Yugoslavia, and the State Union of Serbia and Montenegro. During his time as an elected official, Đorđević was a member of the Democratic Party (Demokratska stranka, DS).

== Early life and private career ==
Đorđević was born in Ražanj, in what was then the People's Republic of Serbia in the Federal People's Republic of Yugoslavia. He was raised in Niš and graduated from the University of Niš Faculty of Electrical Engineering in the department of informatics and automation.

== Politician ==
=== During the Miloševic years (1990–2000) ===
Đorđević ran as a candidate of the Serbian Renewal Movement (Srpski pokret obnove, SPO) in Niš's second division in the 1990 Serbian parliamentary election. He was defeated by Mile Ilić of the Socialist Party of Serbia (Socijalistička partija Srbije, SPS), who was also the city's mayor.

He later joined the People's Party (Narodna stranka, NS), leading its electoral list for Niš in the 1992 parliamentary election and appearing in the second position in 1993. On both occasions, the party fell below the electoral threshold to win representation in the assembly. The People's Party merged into the DS in 1995, at which time Đorđević became a member of the latter party.

The DS contested the 1996 Serbian local elections as part of the Zajedno (English: Together) coalition. The elections in Niš were extremely contentious, with Zajedno accusing the Socialist Party of undemocratic practices and voter intimidation. Zajedno won the election, but the city election commission attempted to falsify the results and award victory to the SPS; this was one of the key events in bringing about the 1996-1997 protests in Serbia, which threatened the SPS's overall hold on power. Đorđević was a leading organizer of the protests within the city.

Ultimately, the Serbian government recognized the opposition's victory in Niš in January 1997. Đorđević was among the Zajedno candidates elected to the city assembly and, after the coalition took power, was appointed as vice-president of the city's executive board, with responsibility for economy and finance. In late 1999, he was responsible for coordinating donations of heating oil from various European Union countries to Niš. He also organized protests against Slobodan Milošević's administration in the same period.

=== The fall of Milošević and after (2000-94) ===
The DS contested the 2000 Yugoslavian general election as part of the Democratic Opposition of Serbia (Demokratska opozicija Srbije, DOS), a broad and ideologically diverse coalition of parties opposed to Slobodan Milošević's administration. Đorđević ran as a DOS candidate for the Yugoslavian assembly's Chamber of Citizens, appearing in the second position on the alliance's list in the Niš division, and received a mandate when the list won three out of five available seats. Slobodan Milošević was defeated by Vojislav Koštunica in the concurrent Yugoslavian presidential election, a watershed event that prompted major changes in the political culture of Serbia and Yugoslavia. The DOS formed a coalition government in Yugoslavia after the election, and Đorđević served as a government supporter in the assembly.

The DOS also won a landslide victory in Niš in the concurrent 2000 Serbian local elections, and Đorđević was re-elected to the city assembly for the twenty-eighth division. He was subsequently appointed as president of the executive board of the Niš municipality (i.e., one of the constituency entities of the City of Niš), as well as serving chairing the board of directors of Elektrodistribucija Niš.

In early 2003, the Federal Republic of Yugoslavia was reconstituted as the State Union of State and Montenegro, with a unicameral parliament. The first members of this body were chosen by indirect election by the republican parliaments of Serbia and Montenegro; only members of the republican parliaments or the previous Yugoslavian federal assembly were eligible to serve. Đorđević was chosen as one of the DS's delegates to the new body. In May of the same year, he was promoted at the local level to president of the executive board of the City of Niš (i.e., effectively the city's first minister).

Đorđević was included in the 246th position (out of 250) on the DS's electoral list in the 2003 Serbian parliamentary election. The list won thirty-seven seats, and he was subsequently included in the party's delegation when the assembly convened on 27 January 2004. (From 2000 to 2011, all parliamentary mandates were awarded to sponsoring parties or coalitions rather than to individual candidates, and it was common practice for the mandates to be distributed out of numerical order. Đorđević's list position had no specific bearing on his chances of election. By this time, the entire country was counted as a single electoral division.) His term was ultimately brief; he was re-appointed to the federal assembly of Serbia and Montenegro on 12 February 2004 and so resigned his seat in the republican parliament.

The DS was defeated in Niš in the 2004 Serbian local elections, and Đorđević stood down as president of the executive board shortly thereafter. The State Union of Serbia and Montenegro ceased to exist in 2006 after Montenegro declared independence. Đorđević has not returned to political life since this time.

== Electoral record ==
=== National Assembly of Serbia ===
1990 Serbian parliamentary election Member for Niš II
Dr. Zoran Aranđelović	Party of Independent Democrats of Serbia	
Ivan Loki Dinčić	Citizens' Group	
Toplica Đorđević	Serbian Renewal Movement	
Dr. Rajko Đurić	Democratic Party	
Dr. Živorad Zlatković	Party of Independent Businessmen and Peasants	
Mile Ilić	Socialist Party of Serbia	Elected
Zoran Krasić	People's Radical Party	
Dr. Petko Stojanović	Citizens' Group	
Svetomir Stošić	Yugoslav Socialist Democratic Party	
