= Ptocheuusa multistrigella =

Scientific classification
- Domain: Eukaryota
- Kingdom: Animalia
- Phylum: Arthropoda
- Class: Insecta
- Order: Lepidoptera
- Family: Gelechiidae
- Genus: Ptocheuusa
- Species: P. multistrigella

Binomial name
- Ptocheuusa multistrigella Ragonot, 1892

Species of moth

Ptocheuusa multistrigella is a moth of the family Gelechiidae. It was described by Émile Louis Ragonot in 1892. It is found in Tunisia.

The wingspan is about 11 mm. The forewings are white, finely striated on and between the veins. The hindwings are pale grey.
