= Trade promotion forecasting =

Trade promotion forecasting (TPF) is the process through which companies try to predict the performance of their trade promotions before running them. By analyzing current conditions and historic demand, it attempts to provide accurate demand forecasting for future campaigns. The ability to distinguish the "uplift", meaning the increase in product demand due to the impact of the trade promotion as opposed to baseline demand, is fundamental to model promotion behavior. Model determination enables what-if analysis to evaluate different campaign scenarios with the goal of improving promotion effectiveness and ROI at the product-channel level by selecting the best scenario.

== Trade promotion forecasting challenges ==
Trade promotion spending is one of the consumer goods industry's largest expenses with costs for major manufacturers ranging from 10 percent to 20 percent of gross sales. Understandably, 67 percent of respondents to a recent survey said they were concerned about the return on investment (ROI) gained from such spending. Quantifying ROI depends heavily on the ability to accurately identify the “baseline” demand (the demand that would exist without the impact of the trade promotion) and the uplift.

In fact, forecast accuracy plays a critical role in the success of consumer goods companies. Aberdeen Group research found that best-in-class forecasting companies (with an average forecast accuracy of 72 percent) have an average promotion gross margin uplift of 28 percent, while laggard forecasting companies (with an average forecasting accuracy of only 42 percent) have a gross margin uplift of less than 7 percent.

A bottom-up sales forecast at the SKU-account/POS level requires taking into account product attributes, historical sales levels and store specifics. The large number of different variables which describe the product, the store and the promotion attributes, both quantitative and qualitative, could potentially have many different values. Selecting the most important variables and incorporating them into a prediction model is a challenging task.

Despite these challenges, two-thirds of companies in the consumer supply chain consider forecast accuracy a high business priority. A total of 74 percent said it would be helpful to develop a bottom-up forecast based on stock-keeping unit (SkU) by key customer.

== Traditional trade promotion forecasting methods ==
Many companies forecast the impact of trade promotions primarily through a human expert approach. Human experts are unable to take into account all the variables involved and also cannot provide an analytic prediction of campaign behavior and trends. A recent survey by Aberdeen Group showed that 78 percent of companies used Microsoft Excel spreadsheets as their primary trade promotion forecasting technology tool. The limitations of spreadsheets for trade promotion planning and forecasting include lack of visibility, ineffectiveness and difficulty in tracking deductions.

Specialized trade promotion forecasting applications have been developed and are becoming more common. A total of 35 percent of companies now use legacy systems, 30 percent use sales and operations planning (S&OP) applications, 26 percent use integrated enterprise resource planning (ERP) modules and 17 percent use home grown trade promotion solutions. These applications support the planning process, while still primarily relying on human knowledge and intuition for forecasting. One problem with this approach is that humans tend to make optimistic assumptions when forecasting and planning. The result is that forecasts most commonly err on the optimistic side and that human forecasters also tend to underestimate the amount of uncertainty in their forecasts.

A further issue is that legacy trade promotion systems contribute to internal fragmentation of trade marketing data. Many companies using these tools are currently producing assumption-based forecasts with limited accuracy.

== Analytic approaches to trade promotion forecasting ==
TPF is complicated by the fact that campaigns are described by both quantitative (such as price and discount) and qualitative (such as display space and support by sales representatives) variables. New approaches are being developed to address this and other challenges. Most of these approaches attempt to incorporate large amounts of heterogeneous data in the forecasting process. One researcher validated the ability of multivariate regression models to forecast the impact on sales of a product of many variables including price, discount, visual, and merchandizing, among others.

The term big data describes the increasing volume and velocity of heterogeneous data that is coming into the enterprise. The data can be used to improve trade promotion forecast accuracy because it usually contains real connections and causation that can help to better understand what customers are buying, where they are buying it, why they are buying and how they are buying. Often, the challenge is to combine this data across all of the silos within the organization for a single view.

Traditional methods are insufficient to assimilate and process such a large volume of data. Therefore, more sophisticated modeling and algorithms have been developed to address the problem. Some companies have begun using machine learning methods to utilize the massive volumes of unstructured and structured data they already hold to better understand these connections and causality.

Machine learning can make it possible to recognize the shared characteristics of promotional events and identify their effect on normal sales. Learning machines use simpler versions of nonlinear functions to model complex nonlinear phenomena. Learning machines process sets of input and output data and develop a model of their relationship. Based on this model, learning machines forecast outputs associated with new sets of input data.

Intelligible machine learning (IML) is an implementation of switching neural networks that has been applied to TPF. Starting from a collection of promotional characteristics, IML is able to identify and present in intelligible form existing correlations between relevant attributes and uplift. This approach is designed to automatically select the most suitable uplift model in order to describe the future impact of a planned promotion. In addition, new promotions are automatically classified using the previously trained model, thus providing a simple way of studying different what-if scenarios.

TPF systems should be capable of correlating and analyzing vast amounts of raw data in different formats such as corporate sales histories and online data from social media. The analysis should be able to be performed very quickly so planners can respond quickly to demand signals.

Groupe Danone used machine learning technology for trade promotion forecasting of a range of fresh products characterized by dynamic demand and short shelf life. The project increased forecast accuracy to 92 percent resulting in an improvement in service levels to 98.6 percent, a 30 percent reduction in lost sales and a 30 percent reduction in product obsolescence.

== The rise of software-based trade promotion forecasting ==
The trade promotion management (TPM) and trade promotion forecasting (TPF) landscape has undergone significant transformation with the emergence of Software as a Service (SaaS) solutions in the late 2010s and early 2020s. Unlike legacy systems that contributed to internal fragmentation of trade marketing data and produced assumption-based forecasts with limited accuracy, SaaS-based TPF platforms have revolutionized how consumer goods companies plan, execute, and analyze their trade promotions. Key advantages over traditional systems include cloud-based architecture enabling real-time collaboration across departments, advanced analytics, and enhanced integration capabilities with other business systems.

Modern SaaS TPF platforms leverage big data technologies to combine data from various platforms used by a business, giving brands a streamlined view of the performance of their promotions. These platforms are powered by machine learning algorithms that recognize characteristics of promotional events and identify their effects on normal sales, along with analyzing a wide range of data, from corporate sales histories to online data from social media, giving planners the ability to respond rapidly to demand signals.

== Key players in SaaS TPF systems ==
The SaaS TPF market has seen a number of entrants offering cloud-based solutions to address the challenges of traditional systems. These include established providers such as Salesforce Consumer Goods Cloud, SAP Trade Management, and Oracle's Trade Promotion Management Cloud.

New notable leaders in TPM include Vividly, whose cloud-based platform automatically identifies correlations between promotional attributes and sales uplift. With software that can process heterogeneous data and provide actionable insights, the company helps clients achieve forecast accuracy improvements similar to those seen in case studies like Groupe Danone's implementation of machine learning technology. In that case, forecast accuracy increased to 92 percent, resulting in improved service levels of 98.6 percent, along with significant reductions in both lost sales and product obsolescence.
