= Ptocheuusa albiramis =

Scientific classification
- Kingdom: Animalia
- Phylum: Arthropoda
- Class: Insecta
- Order: Lepidoptera
- Family: Gelechiidae
- Genus: Ptocheuusa
- Species: P. albiramis

Binomial name
- Ptocheuusa albiramis (Meyrick, 1923)

Synonyms
- Apatetris albiramis Meyrick, 1923

Species of moth

Ptocheuusa albiramis is a moth of the family Gelechiidae. It was described by Edward Meyrick in 1923. It is found in Egypt.

The wingspan is about 9 mm. The forewings are light yellow ochreous with irregular white streaks along all margins of the cell and veins 7-11, partially sprinkled with dark fuscous scales on the edges, and with a slender similar streak along the dorsum and termen throughout. There is an undefined streak of white suffusion along vein 1b. The hindwings are grey whitish.
