= Ptocheuusa cuprimarginella =

Scientific classification
- Domain: Eukaryota
- Kingdom: Animalia
- Phylum: Arthropoda
- Class: Insecta
- Order: Lepidoptera
- Family: Gelechiidae
- Genus: Ptocheuusa
- Species: P. cuprimarginella

Binomial name
- Ptocheuusa cuprimarginella Chrétien, 1915

Species of moth

Ptocheuusa cuprimarginella is a moth of the family Gelechiidae. It was described by Pierre Chrétien in 1915. It is found in Algeria.

The wingspan is about 10.5 mm. The forewings are grey with a violet hue. The hindwings are grey.
