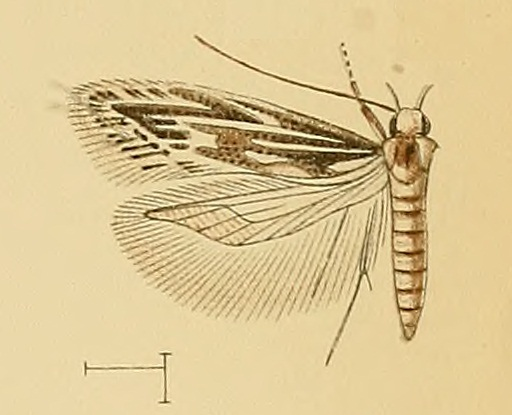

Scientific classification
- Domain: Eukaryota
- Kingdom: Animalia
- Phylum: Arthropoda
- Class: Insecta
- Order: Lepidoptera
- Family: Gelechiidae
- Genus: Ptocheuusa
- Species: P. guimarensis

Binomial name
- Ptocheuusa guimarensis (Walsingham, 1908)

Synonyms
- Apodia guimarensis Walsingham, 1908

= Ptocheuusa guimarensis =

Species of moth

Ptocheuusa guimarensis is a moth of the family Gelechiidae. It is found on the Canary Islands.

The wingspan is 7.5–9 mm. The forewings are pale fawn brown with whitish cinereous (ash grey) lines and streaks. The hindwings are pale grey.
