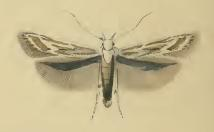
- Ptocheuusa inopella

Scientific classification
- Kingdom: Animalia
- Phylum: Arthropoda
- Clade: Pancrustacea
- Class: Insecta
- Order: Lepidoptera
- Family: Gelechiidae
- Subfamily: Anomologinae
- Genus: Ptocheuusa; Heinemann, 1870

Synonyms
- Syneunetis Wallengren, 1881

= Ptocheuusa =

Genus of moths

Ptocheuusa is a genus of moths in the family Gelechiidae.

== Species ==
- Ptocheuusa abnormella (Herrich-Schäffer, 1854)
- Ptocheuusa albiramis (Meyrick, 1923)
- Ptocheuusa asterisci (Walsingham, 1903)
- Ptocheuusa cuprimarginella Chrétien, 1915
- Ptocheuusa dresnayella Lucas, 1945
- Ptocheuusa guimarensis (Walsingham, 1908)
- Ptocheuusa inopella (Zeller, 1839)
- Ptocheuusa minimella (Rebel, 1936)
- Ptocheuusa multistrigella Ragonot, 1892
- Ptocheuusa paupella (Zeller, 1847)
- Ptocheuusa scholastica (Walsingham, 1903)
- Ptocheuusa sublutella Christoph, 1873
