= Srđan Nikolić =

Serbian politician

Srđan Nikolić (Serbian Cyrillic: Срђан Николић; born 26 March 1959) is a former politician and administrator in Serbia. He served in the National Assembly of Serbia from 1994 to 1997 and was a minister in the Government of Serbia from 1994 to 1998. During his time in office, Nikolić was a member of the Socialist Party of Serbia (Socijalistička partija Srbije, SPS).

== Private career ==
Nikolić was born in Vranje, in what was then the People's Republic of Serbia in the Federal People's Republic of Yugoslavia. He is a graduate of the University of Niš Faculty of Economics.

== Politician ==
Nikolić was a founding member of the Socialist Party of Serbia in 1990 and was chosen as a member of its main board in the same year. He continued to serve on this body over the next decade, as well as leading the party's municipal board in Vranje for a time.

He received the third position on the SPS's electoral list for the Leskovac division in the 1993 Serbian parliamentary election and was elected when the list won seventeen mandates. (From 1992 to 2000, Serbia's electoral law stipulated that one-third of parliamentary mandates would be assigned to candidates on successful lists in numerical order, while the remaining two-thirds would be distributed amongst other candidates at the discretion of the sponsoring parties or coalitions. Nikolić received an automatic mandate by virtue of his list position.) The Socialist Party won a plurality victory in the election and afterwards formed a coalition government with New Democracy. Nikolić took his seat when the assembly convened in January 1994.

Nikolić was appointed as minister of trade and tourism in the government of Mirko Marjanović on 18 March 1994. One of the challenges he faced in this role was currency speculation in the underground economy, occurring against the backdrop of the ongoing Yugoslav Wars of the 1990s and of international sanctions. In March 1995, he argued that recent fluctuations of Yugoslav dinar relative to the Deutsche Mark in unofficial channels were the result of "psychological and speculative reasons," rather than the actions of the government, and that there would not be a return to the hyperinflation of previous years. He said that an arrangement had been made with Belgrade's leading retailers to keep prices unchanged and that the government would intervene if goods were taken off the market. Later in the year, he announced a variety of short-term measures to control prices, adding that the government's primary goal was free price formation on a supply and demand basis.

In April 1996, following the Dayton Agreement and the end of sanctions, Nikolić said that retail prices had stabilized as the result of good supply. He credited the government's actions against monopolistic behaviour and the liberalization of international trade regulations for this outcome.

The trade and tourism portfolios were separated on 28 May 1996, and Nikolić was reassigned as trade minister. He permitted a one-third increase in the price of bread shortly thereafter, in response to complaints from bakeries that existing prices were not enough to cover operating expenses. The following year, he said that Serbia would seek to further liberalize its international trade and would introduce quotas to replace the existing system of contingents, which were seen as disproportionally favouring state-run companies.

The Socialist Party's hold on power was threatened by the 1996-1997 protests in Serbia, which followed accusations of fraud in the 1996 Serbian local elections. In December 1996, Nikolić organized a counter-rally in Vranje in support of the SPS. The government ultimately recognized the opposition's victory in several key jurisdictions, and the protests came to an end.

== Administrator ==
Nikolić was not a candidate in the 1997 Serbian parliamentary election. The SPS formed a new coalition government with the Yugoslav Left (Jugoslovenska Levica, JUL) and the SRS on 24 March 1998, and Nikolić was not included in the new ministry. He was instead appointed to the board of directors for Elektroprivreda Srbije, where he indicated that restructuring was planned for 1999.

In December 1999, Nikolić opened a new branch of Radio Television of Serbia in the opposition-controlled town in Pirot.

Nikolić largely withdrew from public life after the fall of Slobodan Milošević's government in 2000. He continued to work with Elektroprivreda Srbije after this time.
