= Smiljan (given name) =

Smiljan is a South Slavic masculine given name. Its origin is usually associated with the common name for plants which produce "everlasting"-type blooms, many of which are known as smilj and smilje, 'immortelle' (that is, 'everlasting' [flower]) in South Slavic languages. The plant species generally associated with the personal name are Antennaria dioica (plešivec smilj or gorski smilj, the 'bald–' or 'mountain–everlasting'), and Helichrysum arenarium (peščeni smilj, the 'sand–everlasting').

The Lika-region town, Smiljan, Croatia, traditionally shares its name's etymology with the anthroponym—both the placename and personal name being arrived at through the botanic association. An alternative derivation has, however, been suggested for the town: The Croatian linguist and onomatologist, Petar Šimunović believed that the town was named as a patronymic of Smiljan, which over time was abbreviated, losing the patronymic word-element.

In Slovenia, the incidence of baby boys being registered with the name Smiljan has declined from a peak of 105 instances in the 1970s, when it ranked as the 195th most frequently-given boys' name for that decade, to fewer than five boys given the name between 2001 and 2010—and none for the years 2011–2022. According to the Statistical Office of the Republic of Slovenia, the number of male inhabitants of Slovenia with the name Smiljan, as of 1 January 2023, was 283, amongst a population of 2,116,972. This places it as the 402nd most frequent male name in the country.

Notable people with the name include:

- Smiljan Pavič (born 1980), Slovenian basketball player
- Smiljan Radić Clarke (born 1965), Chilean architect of Croatian heritage
- Smiljan Rozman (1927–2007), Slovene writer

== See also ==
- Smilja, the corresponding feminine name
- Smiljanić, patronymic surname
