= Ministry of Telecommunications and Information Society (Serbia) =

- Министарство за телекомуникације и информационо друштво Ministarstvo za telekomunikacije i informaciono društvo

Ministry overview
- Formed: 15 May 2007
- Dissolved: 14 March 2011
- Superseding Ministry: Ministry of Culture, Information, and Informational Society
- Jurisdiction: Government of Serbia

The Ministry of Telecommunications and Information Society of the Republic of Serbia (Serbian: Министарство за телекомуникације и информационо друштво / Ministarstvo za telekomunikacije i informaciono društvo) was the ministry in the Government of Serbia. The ministry merged into the Ministry of Culture, Information, and Informational Society on 14 March 2011.

== History ==
The Ministry was established on 15 May 2007. Four years layer, on 14 March 2011, the Ministry was merged into the Ministry of Culture, Information, and Information Society. In 2012, when the Ministry of Internal and Foreign Trade, Telecommunications, and Information Society was reestablished, it took some of the Ministry's former jurisdictions.

== List of ministers ==
Political Party: DS G17 Plus

Name	Party	Term of Office		Prime Minister (Cabinet)
Minister of Telecommunications and Information Technologies
Aleksandra Smiljanić (1970–)	DS	15 May 2007	7 July 2008	Koštunica (II)
Minister of Telecommunications and Information Society
Jasna Matić (1964–)	G17 Plus	7 July 2008	14 March 2011	Cvetković (I)
