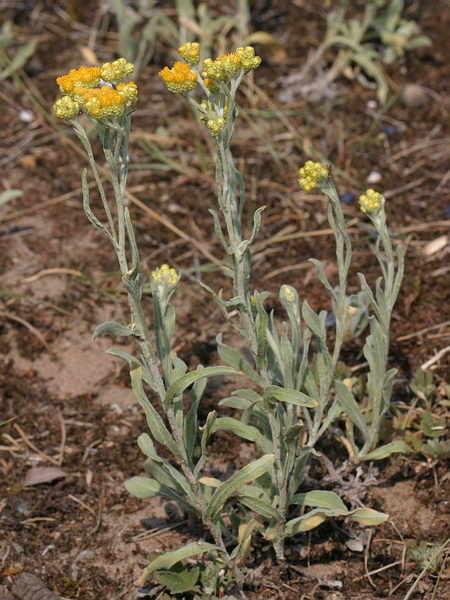

Scientific classification
- Kingdom: Plantae
- Clade: Tracheophytes
- Clade: Angiosperms
- Clade: Eudicots
- Clade: Asterids
- Order: Asterales
- Family: Asteraceae
- Genus: Helichrysum
- Species: H. arenarium

Binomial name
- Helichrysum arenarium (L.) Moench, 1794

= Helichrysum arenarium =

Species of flowering plant

Helichrysum arenarium is also known as dwarf everlast, and as immortelle.

== Description ==
As a perennial plant, it grows to be an average of 0.3 m tall.

The leaves are flat, the lower ones being elliptical in shape, while the upper ones are linear. They are wooly on both sides.

The flower heads are arranged in loosely, a cross between umbel and panicle. They are 3 to 4 mm wide of bright golden yellow florets.

It is found in Eastern France to Sweden as well as on the mountains of Uzbekistan on sandy grasslands, and heathland. It is also widely spread on the Dalmatian coast in Croatia where locals regularly pick and sell it throughout the summer (local Mediterranean climate permitting even as late as September and October).

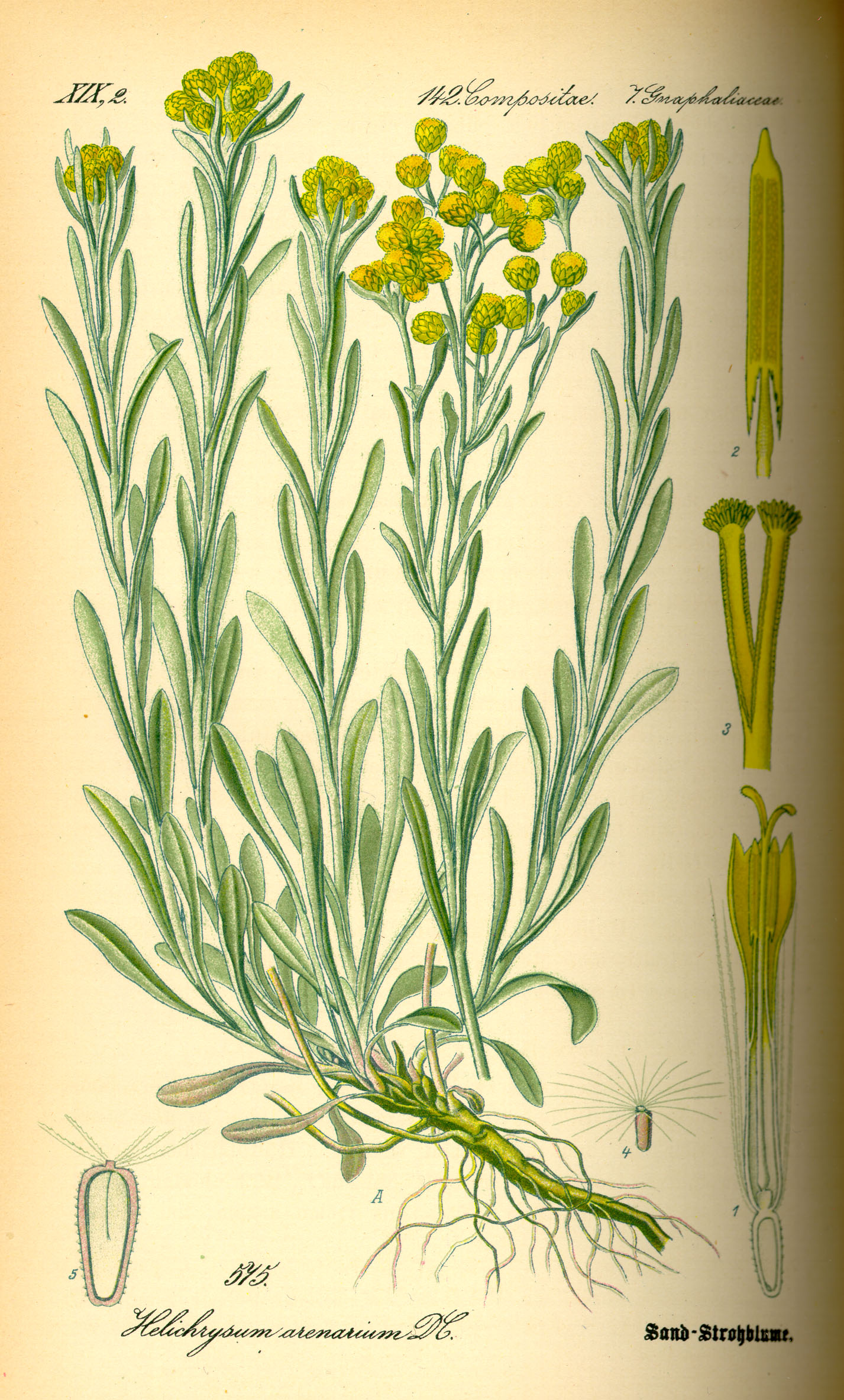
Helichrysum arenarium from Thomé Flora von Deutschland, Österreich und der Schweiz 1885

== Similar species ==
Helichrysum stoechas is similar to the Helichrysum arenarium species, but the leaves are all linear, with rolled under edges. It is found in western France on dunes near the sea.

== See also ==
- Serbian given names Smilja (female) and Smiljan (masculine), derived from Helichrysum arenarium
