= Tomislav Momirović =

Serbian businessman and politician

- Томислав Момировић
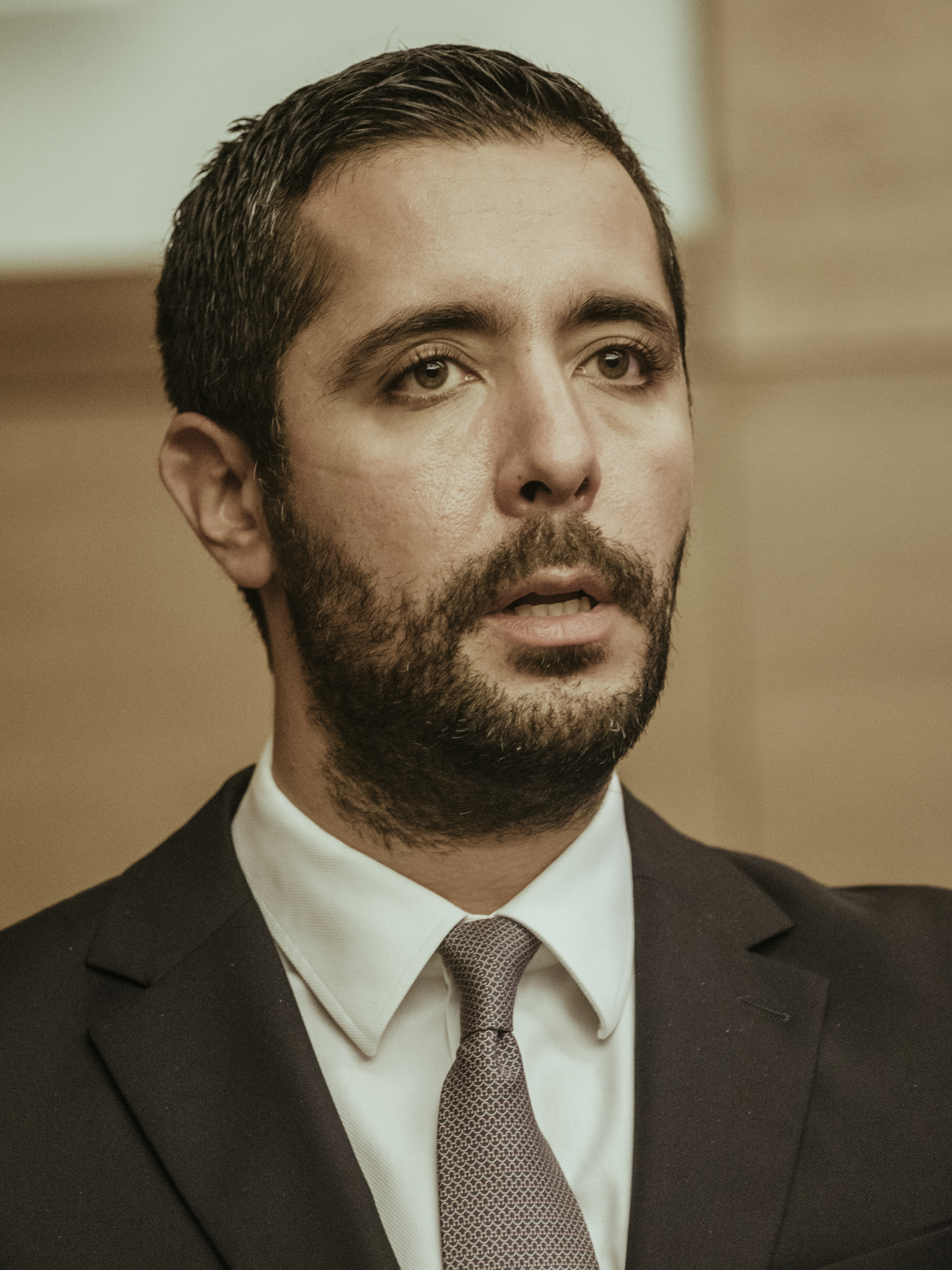
- Momirović in 2021

Minister of Internal and Foreign Trade
- In office 26 October 2022 – 25 November 2024
- Prime Minister: Ana Brnabić; Ivica Dačić (acting); Miloš Vučević
- Preceded by: Tatjana Matić
- Succeeded by: Adrijana Mesarović (acting)

Minister of Construction, Transport, and Infrastructure
- In office 28 October 2020 – 26 October 2022
- Prime Minister: Ana Brnabić
- Preceded by: Zorana Mihajlović
- Succeeded by: Goran Vesić

Personal details
- Born: 17 October 1983 (age 42) Belgrade, SR Serbia, SFR Yugoslavia
- Party: SNS
- Education: University of Belgrade
- Profession: Businessman; politician
- Awards
- Nickname: Toma Mona

Tomislav Momirović (Serbian Cyrillic: Томислав Момировић; born 17 October 1983) is a Serbian businessman and politician who served as minister of internal and foreign trade from 2022 to 2024. A member of the Serbian Progressive Party (SNS), he served as minister of construction, transport and infrastructure from 2020 to 2022.

== Biography ==
=== Early life and family ===
Momirović was born in 1983 in Belgrade which at the time was a part of the Socialist Federal Republic of Yugoslavia to parents Đorđe and Nada who is from Nikšić. His parents founded the Mona Fashion House in 1989. He graduated from the Faculty of Law, University of Belgrade.

=== Business career ===
Since 2007, Momirović was employed in the company Mona d.o.o. in the position of advisor. The accelerated development of the hotel business began in 2011 with the separation of the company Mona Hotel Management d.o.o. Since the founding of the new company, he has been the General Manager of Mona Hotel Management, which manages three hotels (Hotel Zlatibor Mona on Zlatibor, Hotel Javor in Kušići, Hotel Argo in Belgrade) and one residential building Vila Bella in Budva.

He is a member of the HORES business association, where he has been the president of the HORES assembly (Association of hoteliers and restaurateurs - Business association of hotel and catering industry) since 2013, and from 2009 to 2013 he was the president of the HORES board.

Since 2016, he has been the President of Mona Hotel Management d.o.o.

Momirović is also known for tweets in which he shares his views on workers, the economy and business, as well as business advice that caused controversy on social networks.

=== Political career ===
On 25 October 2020, it was announced that Momirović will be the new Minister of Construction, Transport and Infrastructure in the Government of Serbia and Prime Minister Ana Brnabić starting from 28 October 2020. President Aleksandar Vučić pointed out that Momirović's candidacy for the Minister of Construction, Transport and Infrastructure, should not be a surprise as "not only did he come from a successful company, but he was willing to accept the blows of various political, and especially economic ignoramuses, even when he opposed an increase in the minimum wage". Momirović said that "Vučić is a historical figure for him and that it is an honor for him to be a part of this story".

In the cabinet of Miloš Vučević, Momirović was appointed minister of internal and foreign trade. Following the Novi Sad railway station canopy collapse and the death of 15 people on 1 November 2024, Momirović announced his resignation on 20 November. His resignation was acknowledged by the National Assembly on 25 November.
