= Smilja Mučibabić =

Bosnian ecologist-biologist

- Born: October 14, 1912; Mostar, Austria-Hungary
- Died: August 12, 2006 (aged 93); Sarajevo, Bosnia and Herzegovina
- Citizenship: Bosnia and Herzegovina
- Education: Cambridge University
- Known for: Founder of Faculty of Science in Sarajevo
- Scientific career
- Fields: Biology – Ecology
- Workplaces: University of Sarajevo

Smilja Mučibabić (14 October 1912 – 12 August 2006) was a Bosnian biologist. She was among the most distinguished biologists in the former Yugoslavia in the 20th century. She was born in Mostar and died in Sarajevo.

She was:

- first Bosnia-Herzegovinian PhD in biological science (Cambridge, 1953),
- founder and first head of the Department of Biology at the Faculty of Philosophy in Sarajevo (1953),
- co-founder of the Faculty of Science University of Sarajevo (1954),
- the first dean of the Faculty of Science in Sarajevo (1960),
- founder, first and long-time head of the Department of Biology of the Faculty of Science in Sarajevo (1960), and
- co-founder and first president of several professional and scientific associations and their journals (in Bosnia and Herzegovina and former Yugoslavia.

== Biography ==
Smilja Mučibabić was born in Mostar on 14 September 1912, where she received elementary and high school education. From 1930 until 1934 she studied biology at the Faculty of Philosophy in Belgrade. Mostar was then part of the Austro-Hungarian Empire.

Before the World War II she was a professor in Veliko Gradište, and then in Sremski Karlovci. As a member of a group of pro-communist activists, she was arrested and taken to the German camp Jankomir near Zagreb, and later to the prison on the Savska cesta where she was detained until the end of the war 1945.

In the first after the war days, Smilja Mučibabić returned to Krapina and worked ina high school until the end of the school 1945/1946 . She was transferred to the Teacher School in Mostar. The following year, as an experienced professional, she was appointed director of this gymnasium. Her successful management of the Gymnasium and her care for the improvement of teaching were noted, and she received numerous awards and prizes.

In autumn 1949 she became a professor at the Higher Pedagogical School in Sarajevo. She worked there until the founding of the Department of Biology at the Faculty of Philosophy in Sarajevo (1954). Then she was sent to the Zoological Institute of the Faculty of Natural Sciences and Mathematics in Belgrade. For two years she worked for the opening and launching of the newly established chair for biology in Sarajevo.

She got a British Council scholarship to the University of Cambridge. For two years, she worked on a PhD doctoral dissertation in protozoological ecology. Smilja Mučibabić was exceptionally allowed to defending a doctoral thesis after two years.
