= Miljan =

Miljan (Serbian Cyrillic: Миљан, pronounced [mǐʎan]) is a masculine given name of South Slavic origin.

Notable people with the name include:

- Miljan Goljović (born 1971), Serbian-born retired Slovenian basketball player
- Miljan Govedarica (born 1994), Bosnian footballer
- Miljan Miljanić (1930–2012), Serbian football coach
- Miljan Mrdaković (born 1982), Serbian footballer
- Miljan Pavković (born 1981), Serbian basketball player
- Miljan Radović (born 1975), retired Montenegrin footballer
- Miljan Vuković (born 1990), Serbian rower
- Miljan Zekić (born 1988), Serbian tennis player

== See also ==
- Miljanić
- Miljanovac
- Miljanovci (Kalesija)
