= Tatjana Matić =

Serbian politician

- Татјана Матић
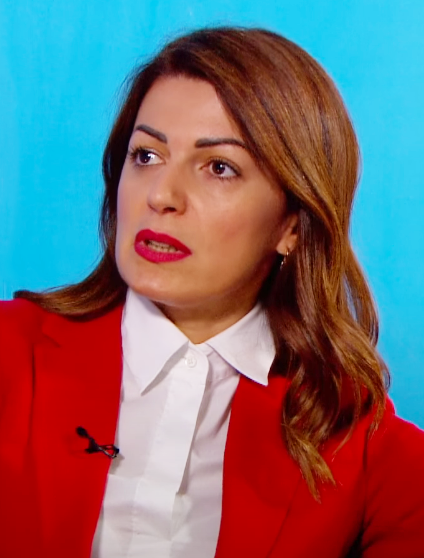
- Matić in 2015

Minister of Trade, Tourism and Telecommunications
- In office 28 October 2020 – 26 October 2022
- Prime Minister: Ana Brnabić
- Preceded by: Rasim Ljajić
- Succeeded by: Tomislav Momirović

Personal details
- Born: 2 July 1972 (age 54) Belgrade, SR Serbia, SFR Yugoslavia
- Party: SDPS
- Education: University of Belgrade
- Profession: Philologist

Tatjana Matić (Serbian Cyrillic: Татјана Матић; born 2 July 1972) is a Serbian politician who served as minister of trade, tourism and telecommunications from 2020 to 2022. A member of the Social Democratic Party of Serbia (SDPS), she served as state secretary in the first cabinet of Ana Brnabić.

== Biography ==
=== Early life and career ===
She was born in 1972 in Belgrade which at the time was a part of Socialist Federal Republic of Yugoslavia. She graduated from the Faculty of Philology at the University of Belgrade and became a professor of Serbian language and literature.

From February to November 2001, she was the Assistant Director for Federal Republic of Yugoslavia of the company "Panasonic". From 2001 to 2002 she worked as a marketing manager of the Belgrade company "William Grants - MPS Group".

=== Politics ===
In 2002, she joined the Government of the then Federal Republic of Yugoslavia and until 2004 she was the Assistant Chief of the Cabinet of the Director of the Coordination Center for Kosovo and Metohija of the FRY, later Serbia and Montenegro and the Deputy Prime Minister of the Republic of Serbia. From 2004 to 2005, she was the head of the mentioned cabinet. From 2005 to 2006, she was the director of the Coordination Body for the cities of Preševo, Bujanovac and Medveđa in Serbia and Montenegro. She performed the same function in the independent Republic of Serbia until 2007.

In 2005, she passed the "Women Leaders" program organized by the US State Department. In the following years, she also went through trainings for the fight against discrimination and risk assessment. In 2010, she was trained as a trainer for IPA programs 3 and 4 (training was funded by the EU).

From 2007 to 2012, she was the Secretary of the Ministry of Labor and Social Policy. During that period, she participated in and managed numerous projects related to public administration reform, which was implemented from 2009 to 2012, and the distribution of assistance from European Union funds.

In July 2012, she was appointed State Secretary of the Ministry of Foreign and Internal Trade and Telecommunications. During that period, she was in the highest position in the implementation of the program of transition from analog to digital TV format in Serbia, she was also the president of several negotiating groups with the European Union within the Coordination Body for the EU accession process., competition and consumer protection and health protection). In the same period, she was also the president of the Product Safety Council and a member of the Board of the Development Fund. She held all these positions until April 2014.

In May 2014, she was appointed State Secretary of the Ministry of Trade, Tourism and Telecommunications. She continued to change the format of the television signal. She was also a member of the Commission for Cooperation with UNESCO in the field of IT and information society. She was also at the head of the Working Group for Defining the National Broadband Network. Since 2015, she has also headed the negotiating groups for Chapters 3 and 10. These chapters are still not open. She is a member of the European Strategic Group on Digital Development. From 2016 to 2018, she was the coordinator of the current program of economic reforms. She remained in the position of state secretary until 2020.

During this period, she was also the idea creator of two large projects implemented by the relevant ministry. These are the projects "Connected and safe - a safe virtual environment for children" and "Information Technology (IT) Caravan".

On 28 October 2020 she took the office of the Minister of Trade, Tourism and Telecommunications in the Government of Serbia.
