= Miljanić =

Miljanić is a South Slavic surname.

Notable people with the name include:

- Ana Miljanić (born 1982), Serbian athlete and politician
- Dijana Miljanić (born 1997), Montenegrin football player
- Miljan Miljanić (1930–2012), Yugoslav and Serbian football player, coach and administrator
- Milomir Miljanić (born 1963), Montenegrin folk singer
- Miloš Miljanić (born 1960), Serbian football manager and player
- Niko Miljanić (1892–1957), Montenegrin and Serbian anatomist and surgeon
- Radmila Miljanić (born 1988), Montenegrin handball player

== See also ==
- Miljan
