= Aleksandra Smiljanić =

- Александра Смиљанић
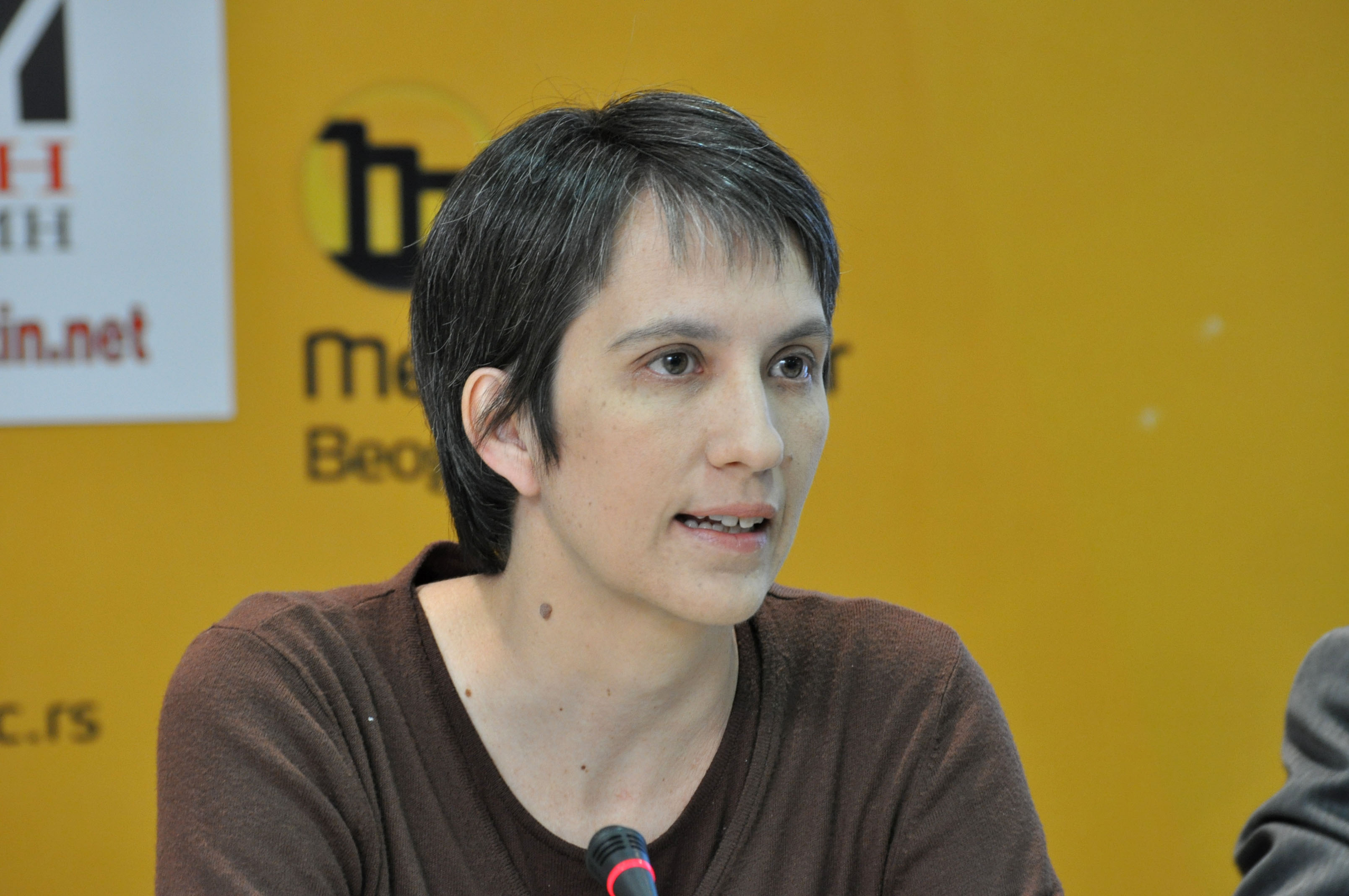

Minister of Telecommunications and the Information Society
- In office 15 May 2007 – 7 July 2008
- Preceded by: Position established
- Succeeded by: Jasna Matić

Personal details
- Born: June 12, 1970 (age 56) Belgrade, SFR Yugoslavia
- Education: University of Belgrade Faculty of Electrical Engineering

Aleksandra Smiljanić (Serbian Cyrillic: Александра Смиљанић; born 12 June 1970) was the Minister of Telecommunications and the Information Society in the Government of Serbia from 2007 to 2008.

== Education and career ==
Aleksandra Smiljanić was born in Belgrade in 1970. After completing secondary education at Matematička gimnazija, she graduated at the University of Belgrade Faculty of Electrical Engineering. Later she received her M.A. and Ph.D. degrees at Princeton University in 1996 and 1999 respectively.

She works as a professor at the Faculty of Electrical Engineering in Belgrade and as a research professor at Polytechnic University of New York. She was also an adjunct professor at Stony Brook University, NYC, and worked at AT&T Labs Research from 1999 until 2004. Her area of research are the architecture and the design of the high-capacity Internet routers. She is the author of numerous conference and journal papers in the area of high performance switching and routing. She is the inventor of nine US patents, and of one patent application. Some of these patents have been patented in Europe, Japan and China as well. She was the Editor of OSA Journal on Optical Networking from 2003 until 2009, and of IEEE Communication Letters since 2005. Her main inventions are the sequential greedy scheduling (SGS) that provides non-blocking through the packet-switched cross-bars, flexible multicasting in high-capacity Internet routers, and a routing algorithm based on load-balancing (LB-SPR).

== Personal life ==
Aleksandra's mother Vladana Likar-Smiljanić is a famous Serbian illustrator of children's books.

Government offices
Preceded by Position established	Minister of Telecommunications and Information Technologies; 2007–2008	Succeeded by Jasna Matić
