= Ministry of Internal and Foreign Trade (Serbia) =

Government ministry of Serbia

- Министарство унутрашње и спољашње трговине Ministarstvo unutrašnje i spoljašnje trgovine

Ministry overview
- Formed: 11 February 1991; 35 years ago
- Jurisdiction: Government of Serbia
- Headquarters: Nemanjina Street 22–26, Belgrade
- Minister responsible: Jagoda Lazarević
- Website: must.gov.rs

The Ministry of Internal and Foreign Trade (Serbian: Министарство унутрашње и спољне трговине, romanized: Ministarstvo unutrašnje i spoljne trgovine) is a ministry in the Government of Serbia which is in the charge of internal and foreign trade. The current minister is Jagoda Lazarević, in office since 16 April 2025.

== History ==
The Ministry was established on 11 February 1991. From 2011 to 2012, it was merged into the Ministry of Agriculture, Trade, Forestry, and Water Economy. The Ministry was reestablished in 2012, under name Ministry of Internal and Foreign Trade, Telecommunications, and Information Society. It took some of the jurisdictions of the Ministry of Culture, Information, and Informational Society, which were previously under the abolished Ministry of Telecommunications and Information Society.

== Organization ==
The ministry is organized into following departments:

- Department for bilateral economic cooperation
- Department for multilateral and regional economic and trade cooperation
- Department for trade, services and competition
- Department for consumer protection
- Department for market inspection
- Department for tourism
- Department for tourist inspection
- Department for electronic communications and postal traffic
- Department for information society
- Department for normative and administrative affairs

== List of ministers ==
Political Party: SPS SRS DS SPO DSS SDPS n-p

Name	Party	Term of Office		Prime Minister (Cabinet)
Minister of Trade and Tourism
Tefik Lugici (born 1938)	SPS	11 February 1991	23 December 1991	Zelenović (I)
Sava Vlajković (born 1950)	SPS	23 December 1991	10 February 1993	Božović (I)
Velimir Mihajlović	SPS	10 February 1993	12 February 1993	Šainović (I)
Radiša Đorđević	SPS	14 July 1993	18 March 1994	Šainović (I)
Srđan Nikolić (born 1959)	SPS	18 March 1994	28 May 1996	Marjanović (I)
Minister of Trade
Srđan Nikolić (born 1959)	SPS	28 May 1996	24 March 1998	Marjanović (I)
Zoran Krasić (1956–2018)	SRS	24 March 1998	24 October 2000	Marjanović (II)
Milorad Mišković (born 1948)	SPS	24 October 2000	25 January 2001	Minić (transitional)
Minister of Trade, Tourism, and Services
Slobodan Milosavljević (born 1965)	DS	25 January 2001	3 March 2004	Đinđić (I); Živković (I)
Bojan Dimitrijević (born 1963)	SPO	3 March 2004	15 May 2007	Koštunica (I)
Minister of Trade
Predrag Bubalo (born 1954)	DSS	15 May 2007	7 July 2008	Koštunica (II)
Minister of Trade and Services
Slobodan Milosavljević (born 1965)	DS	7 July 2008	14 March 2011	Cvetković (I)
Merged into the Ministry of Agriculture
Minister of Internal and Foreign Trade, Telecommunications, and Information Society
Rasim Ljajić (born 1964)	SDPS	27 July 2012	27 April 2014	Dačić (I)
Minister of Trade, Tourism, and Telecommunications
Rasim Ljajić (born 1964)	SDPS	27 April 2014	28 October 2020	Vučić (I • II); Brnabić (I)
Tatjana Matić (born 1972)	SDPS	28 October 2020	26 October 2022	Brnabić (II)
Minister of Internal and Foreign Trade
Tomislav Momirović (born 1983)	SNS	26 October 2022	25 November 2024	Brnabić (III); Vučević (I)
Jagoda Lazarević (born 1969)	n-p	25 November 2024	16 April 2025	acting
Jagoda Lazarević (born 1969)	n-p	16 April 2025	Incumbent	Macut (I)

== See also ==
- Ministry of Telecommunications and Information Society (Serbia)
