= Smilja =

Смиља / Smilja
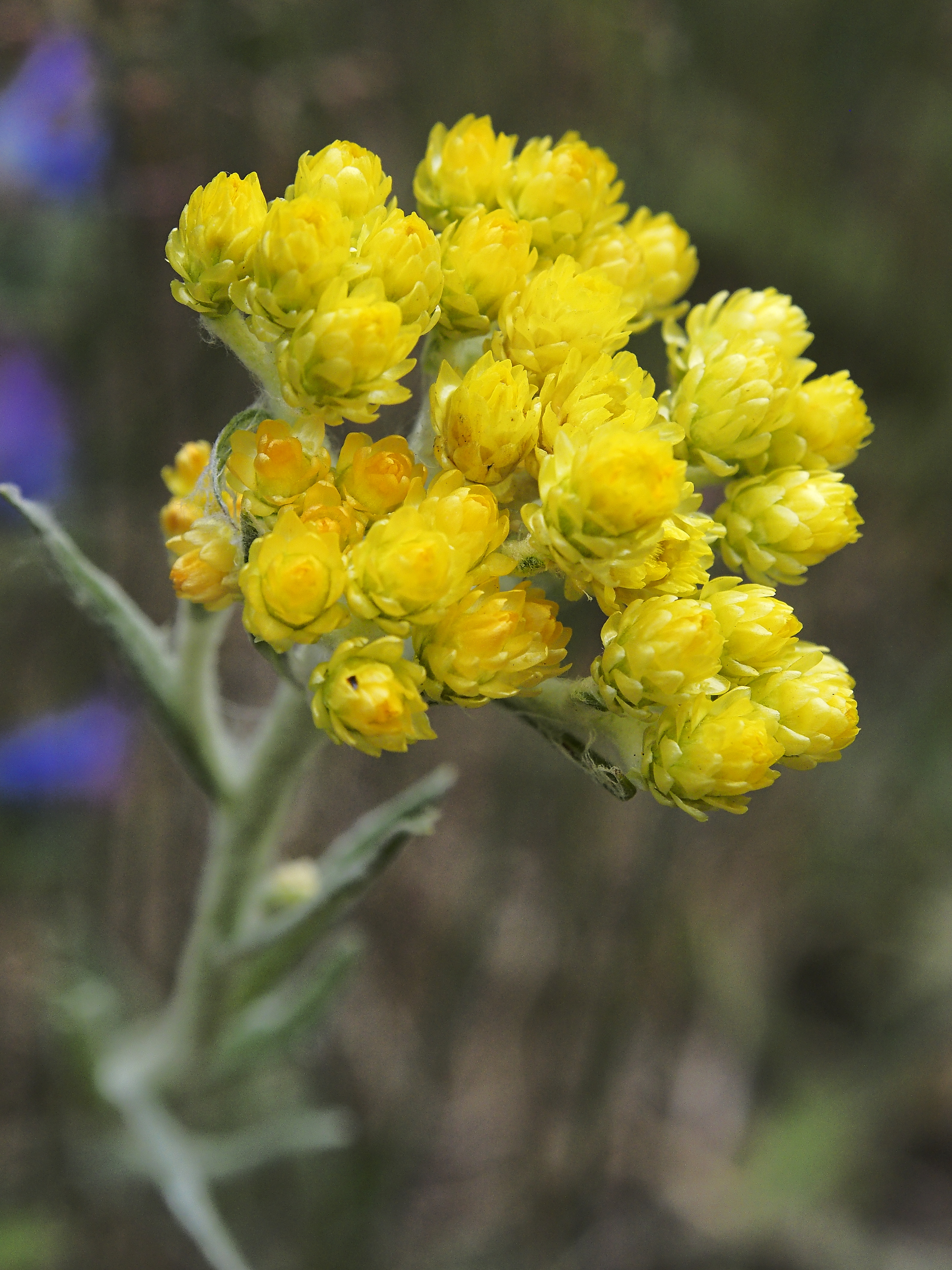
- Helichrysum arenarium flowers.
- Romanization: Smilja
- Gender: Feminine

Other gender
- Masculine: Smiljan

Origin
- Language: South Slavic
- Derivation: Helichrysum arenarium
- Meaning: "immortal" or "everlasting"

Other names
- Nickname: Smiljka

Smilja (Serbian: Смиља) is a South Slavic feminine given name. It is both Serbian and Croatian. Amongst Croatia, it is most prevalent in North-West Croatia. Smilja comes from the name of a plant, smilje, of the species Helichrysum arenarium. The -a ending is a common feminine ending in Slavic languages. A common diminutive form is Smiljka.

Notable people with the name include:

- Smilja Avramov (1918–2018), Serbian legal scholar and activist
- Smilja Marjanović-Dušanić (born 1963), Serbian historian
- Smilja Mučibabić (1912–2006), Bosnian Serb biologist
- Smilja Tišma (born c. 1929), Serbian politician
- Smilja Vujosevic (1935–2016), Canadian chess player of Serbian origin

== See also ==
- Smiljan (given name)
