= Serbia Investment and Export Promotion Agency =

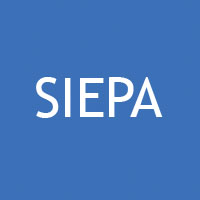
- Formation: 28 February 2001; 25 years ago
- Dissolved: 2016; 10 years ago
- Type: Investment promotion agency
- Headquarters: Belgrade
- Website: www.siepa.gov.rs

The Serbia Investment and Export Promotion Agency (abbr. SIEPA) was a Serbian investment promotion agency. Established on 28 February 2001 by the government of Serbia, the agency promoted foreign direct investment (FDI), and supported companies seeking to set up or expand their business operations in Serbia.

It was shut down in 2016.

== Services ==
The following services were offered to potential investors:

- Providing statistics;
- Economic and legal investment related information;
- Database of greenfield and other investment;
- Assistance in obtaining registration, licenses, permits and other legal documentation;
- Identifying local partners and suppliers;
- Presenting ready-to-invest projects;
- Maintaining investment and exporters databases;
- Delivering sector analysis and studies.

SIEPA networks with all FDI-related public and private sector bodies, including government ministries and other governmental bodies, municipal authorities and local self-government, building land agencies, tax and customs authorities, statistical bureaus, chambers of commerce and the National Bank of Serbia. In addition, SIEPA expert staff offers information packages about law, industries, sectors, business practices, and general doing business in Serbia. SIEPA publications and materials on doing business in Serbia, as well as detailed sector analysis and studies are available in hard copy and can be downloaded at www.siepa.gov.rs. The SIEPA website is currently available in English, Serbian, French, Italian and Russian languages. SIEPA is a member of the World Association of Investment Promotion Agencies (WAIPA), as well as the World Trade Promotion Organizations (WTPO), a part of the International Trade Centre (ITC).

== Recognition ==
- Among the top 8 agencies out of 114 reviewed in developing countries according to the MIGA 2006 IPA Performance Review.
- Awarded special prize for the Best Practices in Promotion – 2007 World Investment Conference.
- Short listed for the 2008 World TPO Awards in the category of the Best Trade Promotion Organization from a Developing Country.

== See also ==
- Investment promotion agency
