= Trade promotion (marketing) =

Marketing activities that are executed in retail between these two partners

In business and marketing, "trade" refers to the relationship between manufacturers and retailers. Trade Promotion refers to marketing activities that are executed in retail between these two partners. Trade Promotion is a marketing technique aimed at increasing demand for products in retail stores based on special pricing, display fixtures, demonstrations, value-added bonuses, no-obligation gifts, and more.

Trade Promotions can offer several benefits to businesses. Retail stores can be an extremely competitive environment; trade promotions can help companies differentiate their products from the competition. Companies can utilize Trade Promotions to increase product visibility and brand awareness with consumers. Trade Promotions can also increase a product's consumption rate, or the average quantity of a product used by consumers in a given time period. Furthermore, effective Trade Promotions can enlarge a product's market segment penetration, or the product's total sales in proportion to the category's competition. Moreover, companies use Trade Promotions to improve distribution of their product(s) at retailers and strengthen relationships with retailers. Lastly, Trade Promotions can be leveraged to introduce new product launches into retail stores.

== Types of Trade Promotions ==
Types of Trade Promotions include:

=== In-store displays ===
In-store displays are promotional fixtures in retail stores. Variations of in-store displays include Point-of-Sale Displays, which are located near cash registers to encourage impulse buying; Floor Stickers, or advertisements for products on the aisle of a store; Feature Displays, which can be located at the end of an aisle to draw attention to a product; and Special Racks, or manipulation of a store shelf to make more space available for a product or bring attention to the promoted product. In-store Displays can be perceived as more visually appealing to consumers than product alone on a retail shelf.

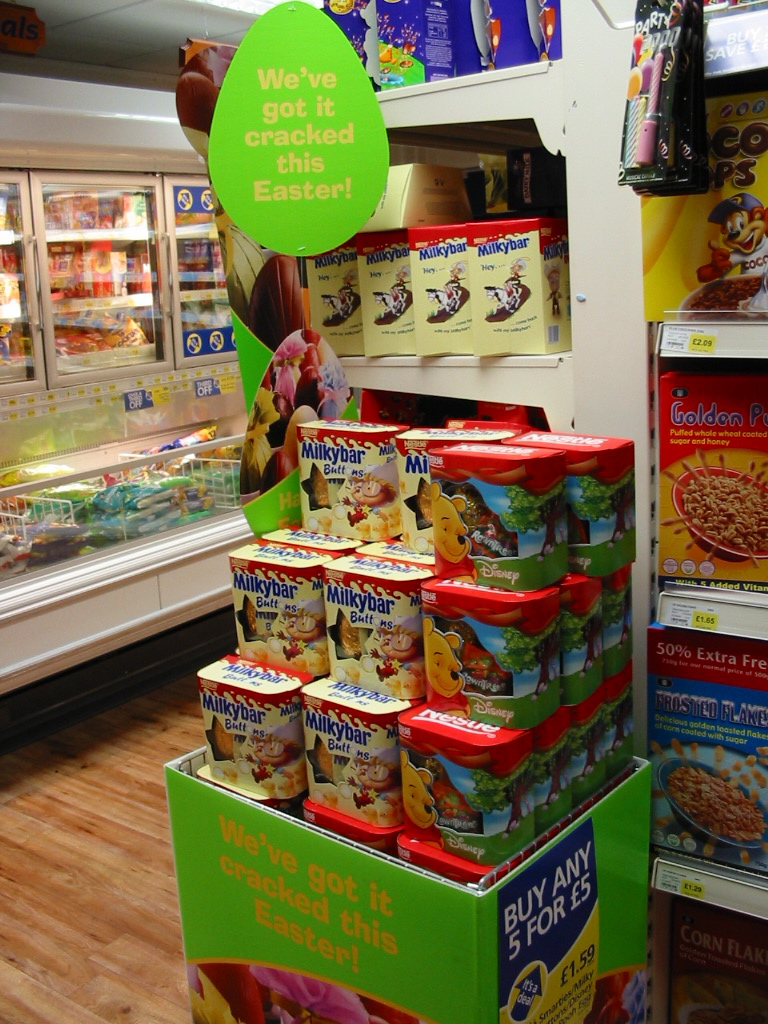
Feature Display

=== Temporary Price Reductions (TPR) ===
(TPR) are either directly or indirectly lower the cost per unit of a product. Examples include "cents off" promotions, where manufactures or retailers temporarily reduce the price of a product, and Bonus Pack promotions which offer extra product for free. Consumers benefit from either paying a lower price on a product or getting more of a product for the same price.

=== Coupons ===
Coupons offer instantly redeemable savings on certain products. Coupons can be featured on In-Store Displays, on their own, or on the product. Coupons instantly reduce the price of a product, making it more desirable to consumers.
Coupons can have both advantages and disadvantages. Coupons create brand awareness. The consumer sees the brand name on the coupon even when the coupon is not redeemed. Coupons, also, encourage consumers to purchase brands on the next trip to the store. The disadvantages that come along with using a coupon are:

- Reduced revenues
- Mass-Cutting
- Counterfeiting
- Missredemptions

=== Contest and sweepstakes ===
Contests normally require the participant to perform some type of activity. The winner is selected based on who performs best or provides the most correct answers. No purchase is required to enter a sweepstakes. Consumers can enter as many times as they wish, although it is permissible for firms to restrict customers to one entry per visit to the store or some other location. The problems with Contest and Sweepstakes are the cost, consumer indifference and clutter.

=== Rebates ===
Rebates offer money back to the consumer. Unlike coupons, rebates cannot be used immediately, but instead must be mailed to the product's manufacturer. Consumers benefit from the lower price, while companies benefit because not every consumer will redeem the offer.

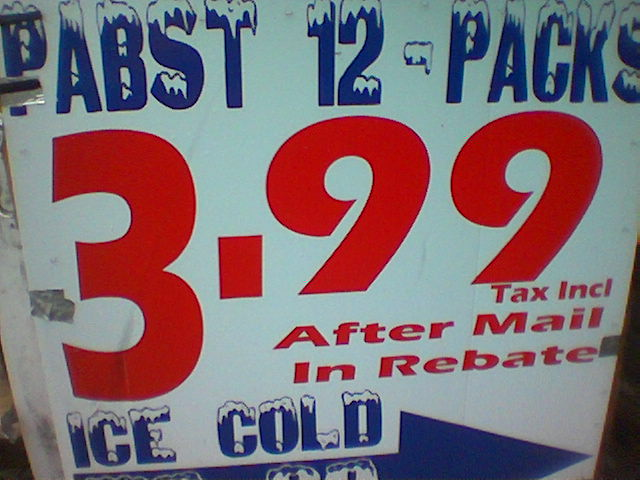
Rebate

=== Premiums ===
Premiums incentivize consumers to purchase a product with a tangible benefit, such as a no-obligations gift. Premiums make the product offer more valuable to consumers by including a related product for no additional cost.

=== Sampling ===
Sampling allows consumers to try the product either in-store or via free samples before buying it. This can reduce consumers' apprehension about buying a new product or introduce them to a product they were unfamiliar with before.

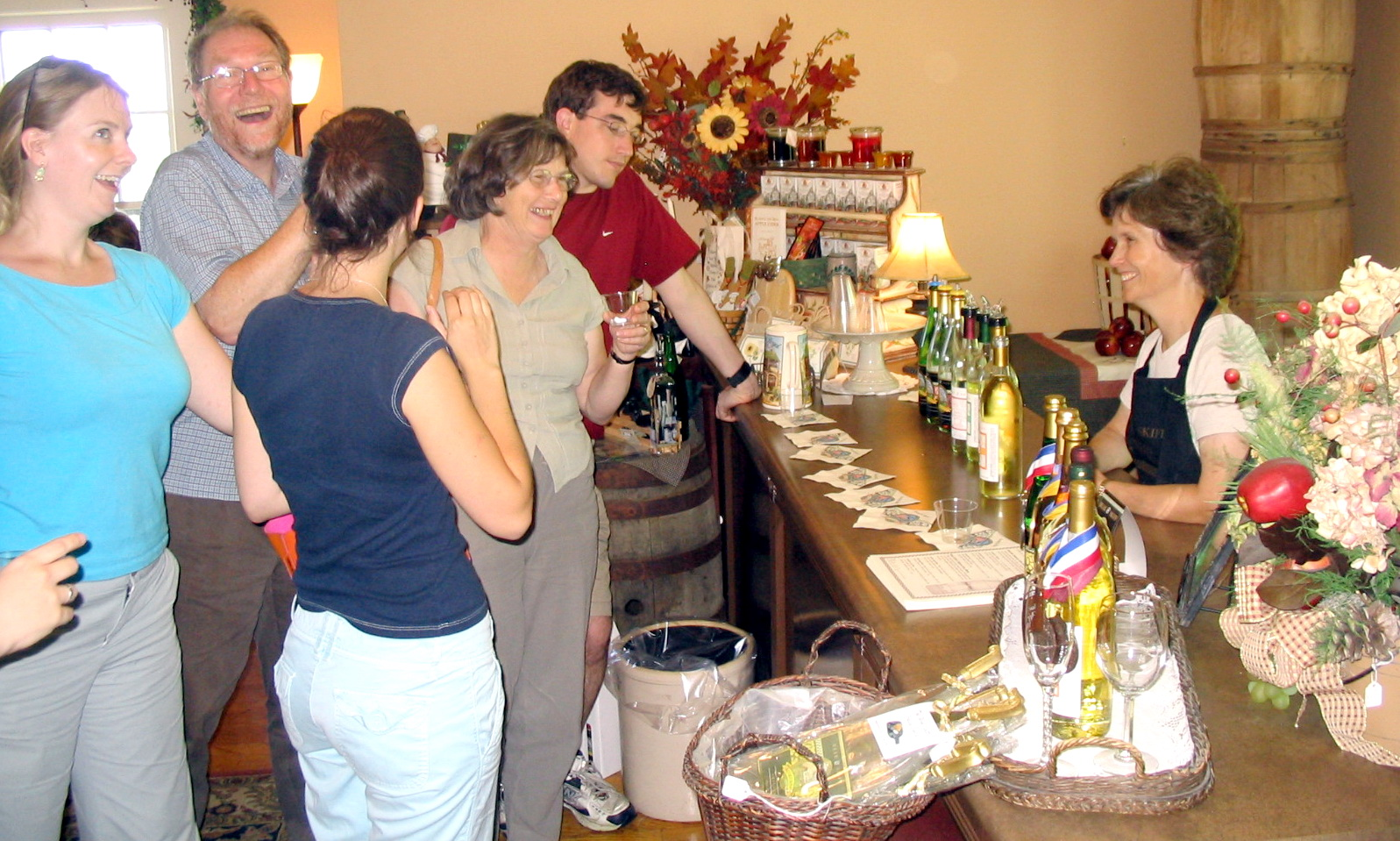
Free Wine Tasting

== Issues in trade promotions ==
In 2004, less than 30% of Trade Promotions in the Consumer Packaged Goods industry were profitable. Several issues cause such lack of profitability. Some potential problems associated with trade promotions programs are costs, the potential impact on small manufacturers, and the tendency to rely too much on trade promotions to move merchandise.

=== Lack of accurate and timely information ===
Trade promotion decisions are often rushed and based on sub-par data. While Sales and Marketing managers are surrounded by promotion information, questions on retail commitment and product forecast accuracy can hinder the process. Multiple data sources and conflicting needs from various departments further complicate the issue.

=== Inability to plan promotions based on analytics ===
Historical trade promotion data should be analyzed in order to continually improve trade promotions. If a company does not utilize processes and systems that measure trade promotion performance, future trade promotion executions could be less effective than if they'd been planned using past analytical information.

=== Ineffective organization and partner integration ===
Lack of integration both internally and with external partners can hinder trade promotion success. Key elements of organizational integration include standardized metrics, regular information sharing, cross-functional department collaboration, and collaborative processes. Integration with retail partners is important to executing promotions successfully, as well as maintain strong relationships with retailers over time.

=== Lack of appropriate Key Performance Indicators (KPI) ===
KPIs tell manufacturers and retailers how trade promotions performed relative to their pre-determined objectives. A lack of understanding on what trade promotion data to measure and how to measure performance can hinder the overall process. Manufacturers and retailers will not know what made a promotion effective or ineffective unless they have predetermined data points to measure and analyze.

=== Poor profitability resulting from cannibalization ===
Measured promotion profitability often overstates profits because it fails to take into account cannibalization by the promoted product of other products. Sales of the promoted product may increase, but this may be partially offset by a decrease in sales of substitute products.
