= Opinion polling for the 1990 Serbian general election =

In the run-up to the 1990 Serbian general election, various organisations carried out opinion polling to gauge voting intentions in Serbia. Out of all organisations, the Institute for Political Studies in Belgrade, Institute of Social Sciences and Centre for Political Research, are known that they carried out opinion polling, including one unknown independent firm. The results of such polls are displayed in this list. The date range for these opinion polls is from the beginning of the election campaign on 28 September to the 1990 election, which was held on 9 December 1990.

== Analysis ==
According to a Washington Post report, opinion polls during the 1990 general election campaign were not very reliable, though they did name any polling firms. The Los Angeles Times reported in their election coverage that in opinion polls for the presidential elections, Milošević had a modest lead over Drašković. Academic Vladimir B. Sotirović noted that after the September opinion poll, the electoral support of SPS vastly increased due to its status as the governing party and due to media control. The Washington Post reported that, according to one opinion poll, SPO could have received the largest number of seats in the National Assembly. A parliamentary election exit poll showed that DS enjoyed strong support in Belgrade.

The Institute of Social Sciences and Centre for Political Research opinion polls in October and November saw two thirds of all respondents say that they would take part in the 1990 general elections. According to their analysis, the average respondent who said that they would take part in the elections was either a follower or a member of a political party, a pensioner, an ethnic Serb, a public sector worker, or a high school educated male. Those who were undecided were identified as the youth, technical workers, unemployed, Yugoslavs, non-Serbs, and independent voters. While those who rejected taking part in the elections were identified as students, Yugoslavs, and housewives.

The newspaper of Serbian Renewal Movement (SPO), Srpska reč, published an opinion poll on 20 November, that it also conducted, in which out of 1,500 respondents, 711 favoured SPO and 251 favoured Socialist Party of Serbia (SPS) in the parliamentary election. In the same opinion poll, 848 favoured Vuk Drašković, the president of SPO, and 220 favoured Slobodan Milošević, the president of SPS, for the presidential election. Political scientist Zoran Slavujević reported that a similar event occurred with the Novi Sad-based polling firm Scientia, which was led by a DS member and also argued with the Institute for Political Studies in Belgrade.

== Graphical summary ==
A local regression chart of poll results for the parliamentary and presidential elections from September to 9 December 1990

== Poll results ==
=== Parliamentary election ===
Polling firm	Fieldwork date	Sample size	SPS	SPO	DS	SRSJS	Others	Lead
1990 election	9 December	–	48.1	16.5	7.8	1.5	26.1	31.6
IDN/CPI	December	1,400	50.1	17.2	8.1	4.1	20.5 (Note: VMDK/DZVM: 2.0%, ZS: 0.9%, NSS: 0.6%, AA: 0.5%, PVD/PDD: 0.4%, UJDI: 0.4%, SČP: 0.4%, SK–PJ: 0.3%, NRS: 0.2%, SJ: 0.2%, SNO: 0.1%, DSR: 0.1%, DS (D–G): 0.1%, DF: 0.1%, LS: 0.1%, NS: 0.1%, ND–PZS: 0.1%, RPJ: 0.1%, SDPJ: 0.1%, SDS: 0.1%, SDA: 0.1%, SSP: 0.1%, Independents: 9.4%, Did not vote: 4.2%.)	32.9
IPS	December	?	36.9	13.5	–	–	49.6	23.4
IDN/CPI	23–25 November	1,400	34.6	12.8	4.8	3.4	44.4 (Note: ZS: 0.5%, SNO: 0.4%, DSHV: 0.4%, UJDI: 0.4%, VMDK/DZVM: 0.3%, SJ: 0.3%, NSS: 0.2%, ND–PZS: 0.2%, NRS: 0.1%, DSR: 0.1%, DF: 0.1%, HMDSJ: 0.1%, JDHS: 0.1%, NKP: 0.1%, RPJ: 0.1%, SDPJ: 0.1%, SDS: 0.1%, SDA: 0.1%, PZLjP: 0.1%, PNH: 0.1%, SSPS: 0.1%, SČP: 0.1%, VRNRS: 0.1%, Nationalistic party: 0.1%, Undecided: 31.5%, Will not vote: 6.4%, N/A: 2.1%.)	21.8
IDN/CPI	October	1,400	30.9	8.7	2.3	2.1	56.0 (Note: NRS: 0.7%, SJ: 0.7%, ZS: 0.6%, SNO: 0.4%, NSS: 0.4%, PVD/PDD: 0.3%, SDS: 0.2%, VMDK/DZVM: 0.1%, DSHV: 0.1%, LS: 0.1%, ND–PZS: 0.1%, NKP: 0.1%, RPJ: 0.1%, SDSS: 0.1%, SDPJ: 0.1%, SSS: 0.1%, SRS: 0.1%, UJDI: 0.1%, SČP: 0.1%, VRNRS: 0.1%, Undecided: 41.6%, Will not vote: 8.4%, N/A: 1.3%.)	22.2
Unknown independent firm	September	?	26.0	11.0	13.0	–	50.0 (Note: 45% of respondents did not have a clear opinion.)	13.0

==== Second round ====
Polling firm	Fieldwork date	Sample size	SPS	SPO	DS	SRSJS	Others	Lead
IDN/CPI	December	1,400	22.9	10.3	2.4	1.1	63.3 (Note: UOS: 3.0%, VMDK/DZVM: 1.3%, UJDI: 0.7%, PVD/PDD: 0.4%, SJ: 0.3%, DS (D–G): 0.1%, DF: 0.1%, RPJ: 0.1%, RS: 0.1%, ZS: 0.1%, SK–PJ: 0.1%, No second round: 29.9%, Did not vote: 21.8%, N/A: 5.4%.)	22.9
IDN/CPI	23–25 November	1,400	40.4	17.5	9.6	7.2	25.3 (Note: Undecided: 18.1%, I would not vote: 6.4%, N/A: 0.7%.)	22.9

=== Presidential election ===
Polling firm	Fieldwork date	Sample size	Slobodan Milošević	Vuk Drašković	Ivan Đurić	Vojislav Šešelj	Blažo Perović	Sulejman Ugljanin	Others	Lead
1990 election	9 December	–	67.7	16.9	5.7	1.9	1.2	2.3	4.3	50.8
IDN/CPI	December	1,400	55.4	16.1	9.0	2.1	0.9	0.6	45.4 (Note: Did not vote: 9.0%, Other: 1.4%.)	39.3
IDN/CPI	23–25 November	1,400	44.1	10.5	–	–	–	–	45.4 (Note: Bogdan Trifunović (SPS): 1.4%, Dragoljub Mićunović (DS): 1.0%, Ante Marković (SRSJ): 0.6%, Budimir Košutić (SPS): 0.4%, Kosta Čavoški (Independent): 0.1%, Nebojša Popov (UJDI): 0.1%, Stanko Radmilović (SPS): 0.1%, Borisav Jović (SPS): 0.1%, Ratko Marković (SPS): 0.1%, House of Karađorđević (Independent): 0.1%, Dobrica Ćosić (Independent): 0.1%, Brana Crnčević (SPS): 0.1%, Undecided: 33.1%, Will not vote: 6.0%, N/A: 2.3%.)	33.6
IDN/CPI	October	1,400	41.5	5.2	–	–	–	–	53.3 (Note: Ante Marković (SRSJ): 0.4%, Dragoljub Mićunović (DS): 0.3%, Nebojša Popov (UJDI): 0.2%, Kosta Čavoški (DS): 0.2%, Aleksandar Bakočević (SPS): 0.1%, Stanko Radmilović (SPS): 0.1%, Undecided: 39.9%, Will not vote: 7.8%, N/A: 4.2%, Will vote for myself: 0.1%.)	36.3
