= 1990 Serbian general election =

- Opinion polls
- Presidential election
- 9 December 1990
- Turnout: 71.40% (▼12.15 pp)
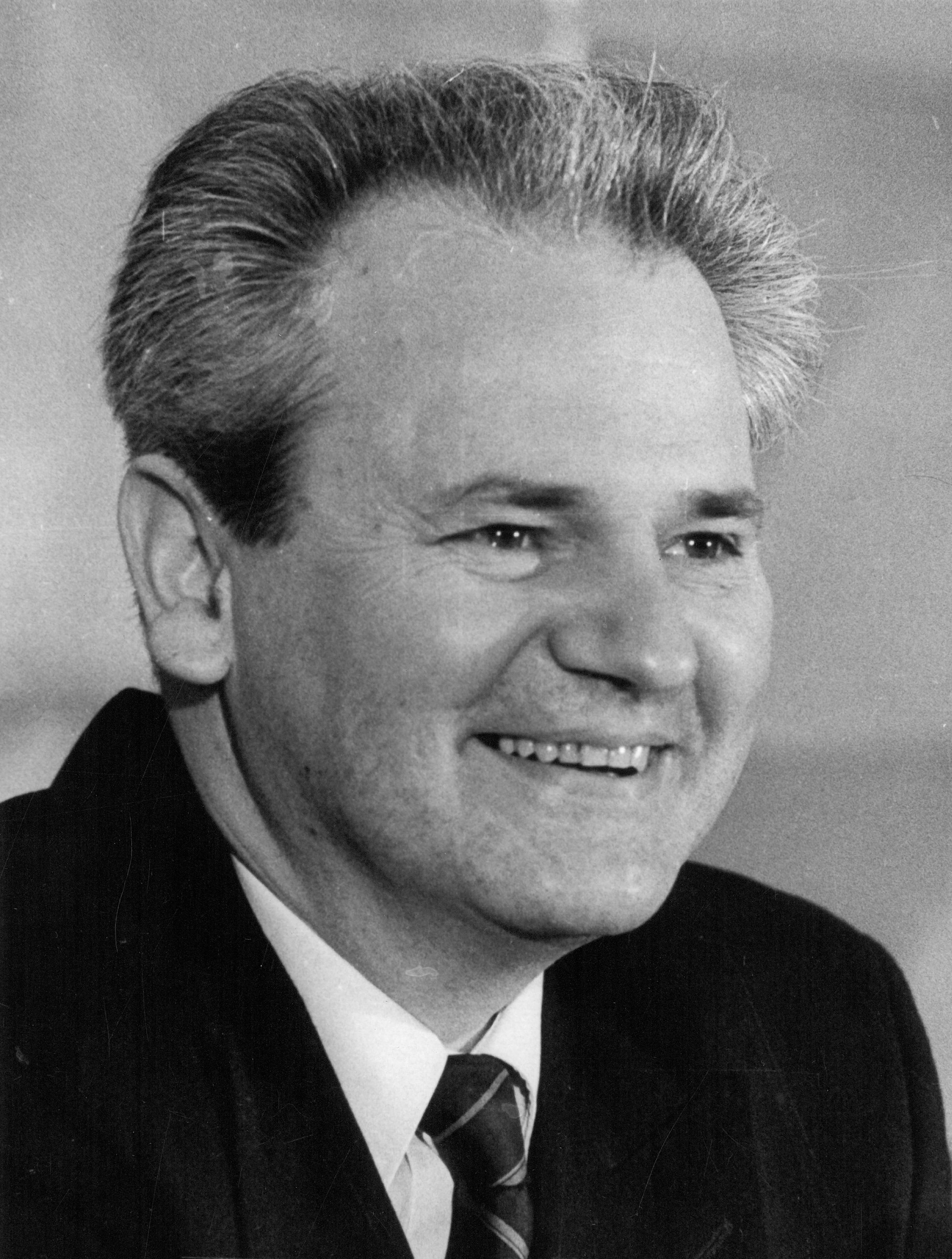

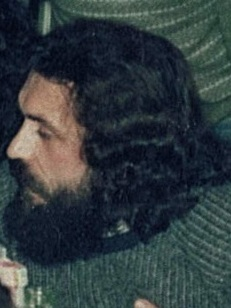

Candidate	Slobodan Milošević	Vuk Drašković	Ivan Đurić
Party	SPS	SPO	SRSJS–UJDI
Popular vote	3,285,799	824,674	277,398
Percentage	67.71%	16.95%	5.72%
President of the Presidency before election
Slobodan Milošević
SPS
Elected President
Slobodan Milošević
SPS
- Parliamentary election
- 9 December 1990 (first round); 23 December 1990 (second round)
- All 250 seats in the National Assembly; 126 seats needed for a majority
- Turnout: 71.39% (▼10.96 pp)
Party	Leader	Vote %	Seats
SPS	Slobodan Milošević	48.15	194
SPO	Vuk Drašković	16.49	19
DS	Dragoljub Mićunović	7.78	7
VMDK	András Ágoston	2.75	8
SDAS	Sulejman Ugljanin	1.75	3
SRSJV	Vojin Dimitrijević	1.55	2
NSS	Dragan Veselinov	1.41	1
SSSS	Milomir Babić	1.09	2
SDS	Anđelko Ležajić	0.68	1
UJDI	Nebojša Popov	0.52	1
DSHV	Bela Tonković	0.49	1
PVD	Riza Halimi	0.46	1
SJ	Ante Ercegović	0.45	1
DRSM	Azar Žulji	0.07	1
Independents	–	9.47	8
This lists parties that won seats. See the complete results below.
Prime Minister before	Prime Minister after
Stanko Radmilović; SPS	Dragutin Zelenović; SPS

General elections were held in Serbia, a constituent federal unit of SFR Yugoslavia, in December 1990 to elect the president of Serbia and members of the National Assembly. The presidential election and the first round of the parliamentary elections were held on 9 December, with the second round of the parliamentary elections taking place on 23 December. The elections were scheduled after the ratification of a new constitution on 28 September, which was approved by voters in a referendum held in July. These were Serbia's first multi-party elections, and the only parliamentary election to be held using a two-round voting system with single-member constituencies; all future elections used proportional representation.

Slobodan Milošević came to power in Serbia at the 8th session in 1987. He then led the anti-bureaucratic revolution, which saw his supporters overthrow the leadership of Montenegro, Kosovo, and Vojvodina. After the July 1990 referendum, Milošević's Socialist Party of Serbia (SPS), Vuk Drašković's Serbian Renewal Movement (SPO), and Dragoljub Mićunović's Democratic Party (DS) became registered parties. Due to low requirements, 1,701 candidates ran for parliament and 32 for president. The campaign was marked by intense polarisation and politically driven incidents. SPS inherited a significant amount of political infrastructure upon its formation, giving it an immeasurable advantage over the opposition. Furthermore, SPS controlled most television, radio, and newspapers, which attacked and discredited opponents, especially Drašković, but portrayed SPS as the party of peace. The SPO and Ivan Đurić of Union of Reform Forces during the campaign called for an election boycott over but ultimately dropped after the government agreed to most of their demands in late November.

The primary issue during the campaign was nationalism. SPS and Milošević focused on positive themes and stability, whereas Drašković ran on a nationalist platform. DS and Đurić campaigned on a liberal programme. By the end of the campaign, an SPS supporter had murdered an SPO activist. With a turnout of 71%, primarily due to the Kosovo Albanians' boycott, Milošević won the presidential election in the first round in a landslide, with Drašković placing second. Despite gaining 48% of the popular vote, SPS received 194 out of 250 seats in the National Assembly due to the first-past-the-post electoral system.

The opposition initially claimed electoral fraud in the elections, but eventually conceded. Observers and political scientists reported that electoral irregularities such as ballot stuffing and vote buying took place. After the elections, Dragutin Zelenović became prime minister. His tenure saw Drašković's detention during the 1991 mass protests in Belgrade, the outbreak of the Yugoslav Wars, and the establishment of Federal Republic of Yugoslavia in 1992. Snap elections were then called for December 1992.

== Background ==
=== Post-World War II ===
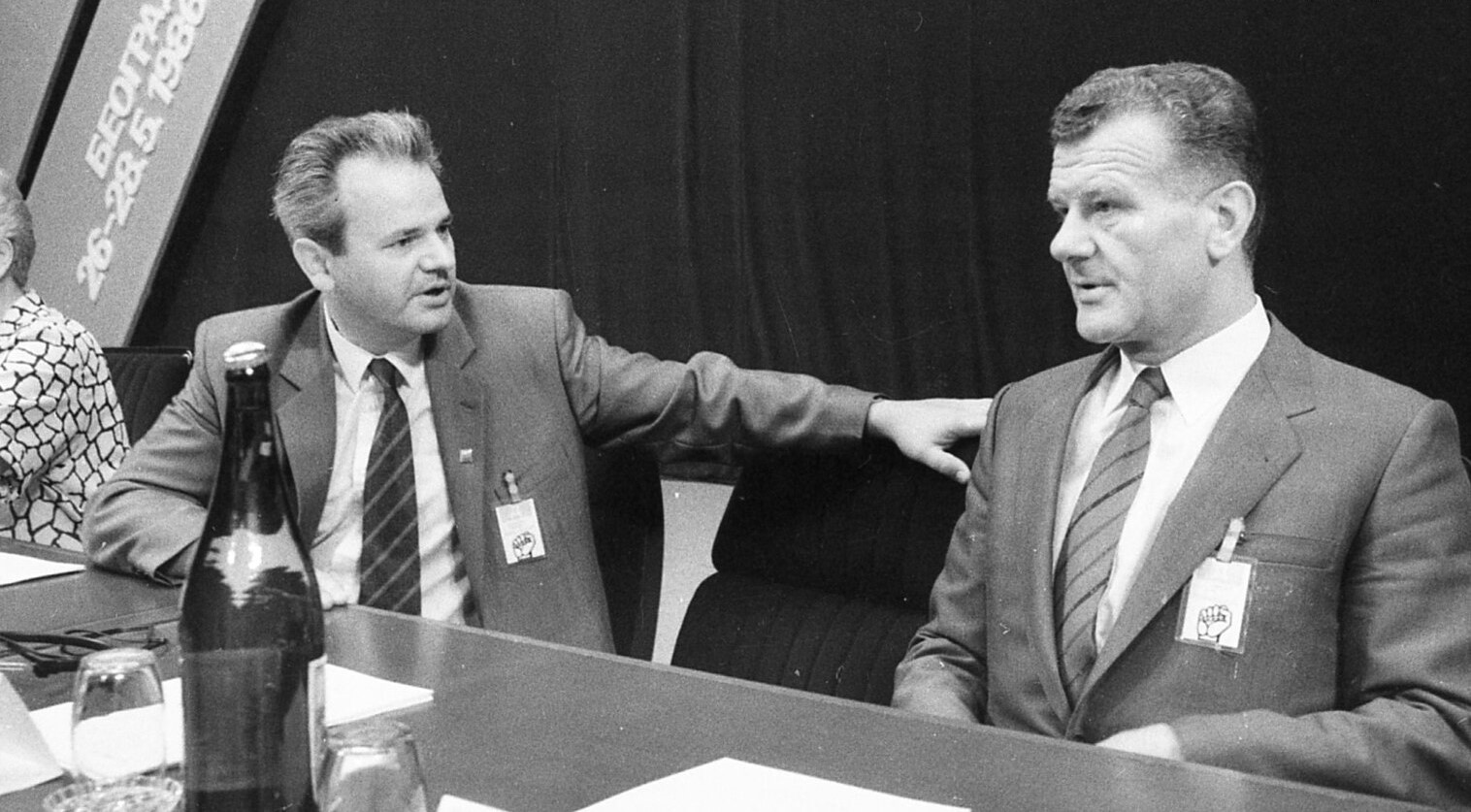
Slobodan Milošević (left) came to power in 1987 after removing Ivan Stambolić (right) and his allies from key positions

After World War II, the Communist Party (later the League of Communists of Yugoslavia, SKJ) consolidated power in Yugoslavia, transforming the country into a socialist state. Each constituent republic had its own branch of the Communist Party, with Serbia having the Communist Party of Serbia, later renamed the League of Communists of Serbia (SKS). With the death of Josip Broz Tito, the leader of Yugoslavia, in 1980, the country was faced with economic issues, constitutional problems, and a rise in ethnic nationalism.

Within Serbia, Slobodan Milošević came to power at the 8th session in September 1987. Milošević served as the president of the League of Communists of Belgrade City Committee until being appointed president of SKS in May 1986 upon the proposal of his mentor Ivan Stambolić, a reformist within SKS. Milošević turned populist in April 1987 and then became a critic of Stambolić. Milošević dismissed Stambolić's allies at the 8th session, and in December 1987, Stambolić was removed as president of Serbia. With Milošević now in power, protests supporting Milošević's policies, known as the anti-bureaucratic revolution, started in Serbia and Montenegro in 1988. Following the protests, the leadership in Montenegro, Vojvodina, and Kosovo was replaced by the pro-Milošević faction.

Milošević was named president of the presidency of the Socialist Republic of Serbia in May 1989, after being nominated to the position by the Socialist Alliance of Working People of Serbia. In response to his appointment, general elections were announced for November 1989. Milošević won the election in a landslide, officially being elected president of the presidency of the SR Serbia. These were the last one-party elections in Serbia. Stanko Radmilović, a Milošević loyalist, became the prime minister of Serbia after the elections.

In January 1990, an SKJ extraordinary congress was held to address the dispute over Milošević's centralisation reforms and reforms of the Federal Assembly of Yugoslavia. During the congress, SKS proposed implementing a "one man–one vote" system, which was opposed by the Slovene delegation, who favoured a confederated Yugoslavia. Milošević was fiercely opposed to confederalism. With the assistance of delegates from Montenegro, Vojvodina, Kosovo, and the Yugoslav People's Army, the proposals from SKS were accepted, while the Slovene and Bosnian proposals were rejected. This ultimately led to the dissolution of SKJ shortly after the congress.

=== Constitutional referendum ===
On 13 June 1990, the Democratic Party (DS), Liberal Party (LS), People's Radical Party (NRS), Serbian Renewal Movement (SPO), and Social Democratic Party of Yugoslavia (SDPJ) organised the first opposition protest since World War II. They demanded that free elections be held that year and petitioned for the establishment of a multi-party system. The protest in Belgrade drew between 30,000 and 40,000 people. Radio Television of Belgrade (RTB) covered the protest negatively and the government labelled the protest as "anti-Serbian". During the protest, the police intervened and brutally attacked DS politicians Dragoljub Mićunović and Borislav Pekić. Four cars were damaged during the protests, according to the police, and seven demonstrators were arrested, according to the opposition.

Milošević then unexpectedly announced on 25 June 1990 in the Assembly of the Socialist Republic of Serbia that a constitutional referendum would take place on 1 and 2 July, to determine the new constitution of Serbia. The referendum was held during a crisis in Kosovo. As reported by Zoran Sokolović, the president of the Assembly of SR Serbia, in the Official Gazette, the proposal was recommended by the presidency of SR Serbia and members of the Assembly of SR Serbia.

Prior to the announcement, the government had rejected holding elections in 1990. The government, however, had discussed with the opposition parties on the implementation of a multi-party system. Nevertheless, the discussion was unsuccessful. In response to the announcement, a protest was held at the building of the RTB, criticising the referendum and state controlled media. During the protest, Vojislav Šešelj, the leader of the Serbian Chetnik Movement (SČP), delivered a speech critical of the government. Opposition political parties demanded that the referendum be postponed until after the first multi-party elections, and called on their supporters to boycott the referendum if the demand was not met.

The state media labelled those opposing the referendum as "anti-Serbian" and "pro-Albanian". The results published by the Republic Electoral Commission (RIK) showed that the referendum passed. On 5 July, the government of Serbia dissolved the Assembly of SAP Kosovo and its government. This was done in response to the proclamation of the Republic of Kosova three days prior. The newly adopted constitution effectively abolished SAP Kosovo's autonomy. "They tried to declare Kosovo a republic and by that they endangered Serbia and Yugoslavia", Sokolović said. This move was condemned by Amnesty International and the European Parliament. The constitution went into effect on 28 September, establishing a semi-presidential system in Serbia. Opposition parties criticised the constitution due to the high amount of powers that were given to the president of Serbia.

== Electoral system ==
With the adoption of a new constitution in September 1990, a new electoral system was introduced in Serbia. The 250 members of the National Assembly of Serbia were elected using a first-past-the-post, two-round voting system from 250 single-member constituencies. All subsequent elections in Serbia have been conducted under a proportional representation system. A constituency's territory could consist of multiple local communities (mesna zajednica), populated places (naseljena mesta), or a single municipality. Eligible voters were able to vote for only one candidate in their respective constituencies. A campaign for an election could have lasted 30 to 90 days.

A candidate could be nominated by one or more political parties or other registered political organisations with at least 100 valid signatures from constituency residents, or by a citizens group (grupa građana) instead. A citizens group, under the law enacted in 1990, is a group of 100 citizens bound by an agreement willing to take part in an election. The candidate was submitted to RIK by its proposer. RIK could deny a candidate, after which the deficiencies had to be corrected within 48 hours if the candidate was to be re-submitted again. The symbol of a constituency, the name of the election, and a list of candidates that ran in the constituency were present on the voting ballot. In the first round, a candidate was elected if it earned at least 50% of the popular vote, while in the second round the candidate with the most votes won.

In the presidential election, a candidate had to be a resident of Serbia that was proposed by one or more political parties, political organisations, or a citizens group. A candidate was elected if it received a majority of all votes cast and if at least half of all voters participated in the election. If no candidate received a majority of all votes cast, the second round had to be held within the next fifteen days. In the second round, at least two of the candidates with the highest votes compete. An election was considered valid if the turnout was at least 50%; otherwise, a snap election is scheduled. The newly established position of the president of Serbia was not ceremonial, instead it had significant powers and served as part of the executive branch of the government.

RIK, local election commissions, and polling boards of constituencies have overseen elections in Serbia. At the time of the election, Časlav Ignjatović served as the president of RIK. Parliamentary and presidential elections were called by the president of the National Assembly, who also had to announce their dates. Regarding the 1990 election, the presidential and parliamentary elections were called by Sokolović on 28 September for 9 December. In the event of run-offs, the second round of the parliamentary election was set for 23 December. According to the law, a parliamentary election is held every four years, though it is possible for a snap election to take place. If a snap election occurs, then the president of Serbia has to call the election, as well as dissolve the National Assembly. A presidential election is held every five years.

To vote, a person had to be a citizen, able to perform working duties, and at least 18 years old. Those in the military had the right to vote at military establishments. Voting also took place in hospitals, nursing homes, and police barracks. During the election day, eligible voters could have voted from 07:00 (UTC+01:00) to 20:00 at a voting station in their constituency. Voters who were either blind, disabled, or illiterate could have brought a relative to vote on their behalf at a voting station. This was the first multi-party election in Serbia.

=== Signatures dispute ===
Shortly before the adoption of the new constitution and the news laws, both proposed election laws, the Law on Constituencies for the Election of People's Deputies and the Law on the Election of the President of the Republic, stated that a much larger number of collected signatures was required to submit candidates; for the parliamentary election, the number was 500, while for the presidential election, the number was 10,000. This was strongly opposed by opposition parties; they claimed that this would effectively bar them from participating in the elections. The opposition wanted the number of collected signatures that were required to participate in the elections to be lowered. For the presidential elections, they proposed the number to be 50.

The government accepted the opposition's proposal; however, while they lowered the number of needed signatures for the parliamentary elections to 100, they also lowered the number of needed signatures for presidential elections to 100. As a result, 34 candidates submitted for the presidency; 32 candidates were ultimately accepted to participate in the presidential elections.

=== Political parties ===
The table below lists political parties elected to the Assembly of SR Serbia after the 1989 parliamentary election. At the time of the 1989 election, Bogdan Trifunović was the president of the presidency of the Central Committee of SKS. During its existence, the Assembly of SR Serbia was divided into the Council of Associated Labour, the Council of Municipalities, and the Socio-Political Council. In the Council of Associated Labour, 134 SKS delegates were elected; in the Council of Municipalities, 84 SKS delegates were elected; and in the Socio-Political Council, 85 SKS delegates were elected.

Political parties elected to the Assembly of SR Serbia after the 1989 parliamentary election
Name	Leader	1989 result
Name	Leader	Seats
League of Communists of Serbia	Bogdan Trifunović	303 / 340
Independents	–	37 / 340

Although there was dissent during the one-party period, the formation of other political parties was prohibited. By the time of the Revolutions of 1989, other republics adopted political pluralism, forcing the SKS to relax its positions, which led to the emergence of opposition parties. The registry of political parties was established with the passage of the Law on Political Organisations in July 1990. The first political parties in the registry included the Socialist Party of Serbia (SPS), the legal successor of SKS, Serbian Renewal Movement (SPO), Serbian National Renewal (SNO), Serbian Saint Sava Party, People's Radical Party (NRS), Democratic Party (DS), New Democracy – Movement for Serbia (ND), Democratic Fellowship of Vojvodina Hungarians, Party of Independent Entrepreneurs and Peasants, New Communist Movement, Workers' Party of Yugoslavia, Democratic Forum, Party of Democratic Action (SDA), Movement for the Protection of Human Rights, Alliance of All Serbs of the World, Democratic Alliance of Croats in Vojvodina, Independent Democratic Association, Party for Democratic Action, Republican Party, Old Radical Party, People's Party (NS), Green Party (ZS), Democratic Party of Freedom, Liberal Party (LS), Democratic Party (Davidović–Grol), Democratic Political Party Roma, Party of Social Justice, People's Peasant Party (NSS), Serb Democratic Party, and Party of Yugoslavs.

Given that SPS was formed as a merger of SKS and the Socialist Alliance of Working People of Yugoslavia, it inherited a significant amount of political infrastructure, as well as material and financial assets. With these resources and its continued influence over major industries, SPS was able to maintain dominance over political events in Serbia. Milošević was the president of SPS. DS was founded in December 1989, when a group of intellectuals announced the revival of the interwar Democratic Party. Dragoljub Mićunović and Kosta Čavoški were the candidates in the inaugural DS leadership election. Mićunović and Čavoški held opposing political beliefs, with Mićunović being a liberal and Čavoški being an anti-communist nationalist. Mićunović won the leadership election and led DS in the 1990 parliamentary election.

Vuk Drašković, а prominent writer known for his nationalist books in the 1980s, was the co-founder of SPO. Drašković was first affiliated with the Saint Sava Association before joining the Serbian National Renewal (SNO). In March 1990, SNO president Mirko Jović verbally attacked Drašković for his prior membership in SKJ, causing a schism within the party. Drašković then left SNO and formed SPO with Šešelj. Drašković was also elected its president. SPO was an extreme nationalist party during the 1990 elections, with Drašković described as a "serious threat" to Milošević. Šešelj left SPO in May 1990 after disagreements about boycotting Siniša Kovačević's play Saint Sava. He then formed SČP in June 1990, although it remained an unregistered party. In 1991, SČP became the Serbian Radical Party (SRS).

== Participants ==
=== Parliamentary candidates ===
Socialist Party of Serbia, Serbian Renewal Movement, and the Democratic Party were the main parties in the 1990 election.

The parliamentary election was contested by 1,701 candidates, 81 of whom were women, who were either proposed by a registered political party or citizens groups. Out of that number, 342 candidates were proposed by a citizens group. The second round of the parliamentary election was contested by 303 candidates. At the time of the election, there were 56 registered parties. The three main political parties in Serbia at the time of the election were SPS, SPO, and DS.

In the election, SPS nominated 250 candidates, followed by SPO which nominated 237 candidates, and DS which nominated 179 candidates. The elections were also contested by a large number of public figures. SPS candidates Bata Živojinović, Mihailo Janketić, and Miroslav Ilić, Union of Reform Forces of Yugoslavia in Serbia (SRSJS) candidates Bora Todorović and Ljuba Tadić, and DS candidates Svetislav Basara and Gojko Đogo competed in the election. Vojislav Brajović, Ljubivoje Ršumović, Branko Milićević, and Minja Subota also contested the elections on behalf of citizens groups.

Kosovo Albanians, 700,000 of whom were registered to vote in the 1990 elections, boycotted the election. As a result, SPS was able to sweep the constituencies in Kosovo, winning five without opposition. Before the election campaign began, Kosovo Albanians staged protests and strikes, which were ultimately suppressed by the government of Serbia. According to Reuters, opposition parties in Kosovo also said that "they would not respect Serbia's new constitution". Ibrahim Rugova, the president of the Democratic League of Kosovo (LDK), said that "to participate in these elections would mean that we accept the conditions the Serbians have imposed upon us". Kosovo Albanians continued to boycott the elections until 1997.

=== Presidential candidates ===
The following list includes candidates who took part in the presidential election. The election had 32 contestants, which has remained the highest number of candidates in any presidential election in Serbia since then. Ljiljana Ćuić became the first female to contest a presidential election.

- Ljuben-Alen Aleksov, proposed by a citizens group
- Nikola Barović, proposed by a citizens group
- Miroslav Veselinović, proposed by a citizens group
- Ratimir Vojvodić, proposed by a citizens group
- Predrag Vuletić, proposed by the Liberal Party
- Miodrag Gojković, proposed by the Party of Independent Businessmen "Zapis"
- Saša Goranci, proposed by a citizens group
- Ljubomir Grujić, proposed by a citizens group
- Vuk Drašković, proposed by the Serbian Renewal Movement
- Ivan Đurić, proposed by the Union of Reform Forces of Yugoslavia in Serbia and Association for Yugoslav Democratic Initiative
- Tihomir Živanović, proposed by a citizens group
- Dragan Jovanović, proposed by the Green Party
- Jovan Koprivica, proposed by a citizens group
- Tomislav Krsmanović, proposed by the Movement for the Protection of Human Rights
- Milan Lazarević, proposed by a citizens group
- Slobodan Milošević, proposed by the Socialist Party of Serbia
- Slobodan Mitić, proposed by the Alliance of All Serbs of the World
- Milan Mladenović, proposed by a citizens group
- Čedomir Nešić, proposed by a citizens group
- Blažo Perović, proposed by the YU Bloc
- Milorad Radović, proposed by a citizens group
- Hercen Radonjić, proposed by a citizens'group
- Slobodan Ranković, proposed by a citizens group
- Jovan Stojković, proposed by a citizens' group
- Miomir Tošić, proposed by a citizens group
- Ljiljana Ćuić, proposed by a citizens group
- Sulejman Ugljanin, proposed by the Party of Democratic Action from Novi Pazar
- Živan Haravan, proposed by the Party of Social Justice
- Velimir Cvetić, proposed by the Social Democratic Party of Yugoslavia
- Radivoje Šaranac, proposed by the Republican Party
- Nikola Šećeroski, proposed by a citizens group
- Vojislav Šešelj, proposed by a citizens group

== Campaign ==
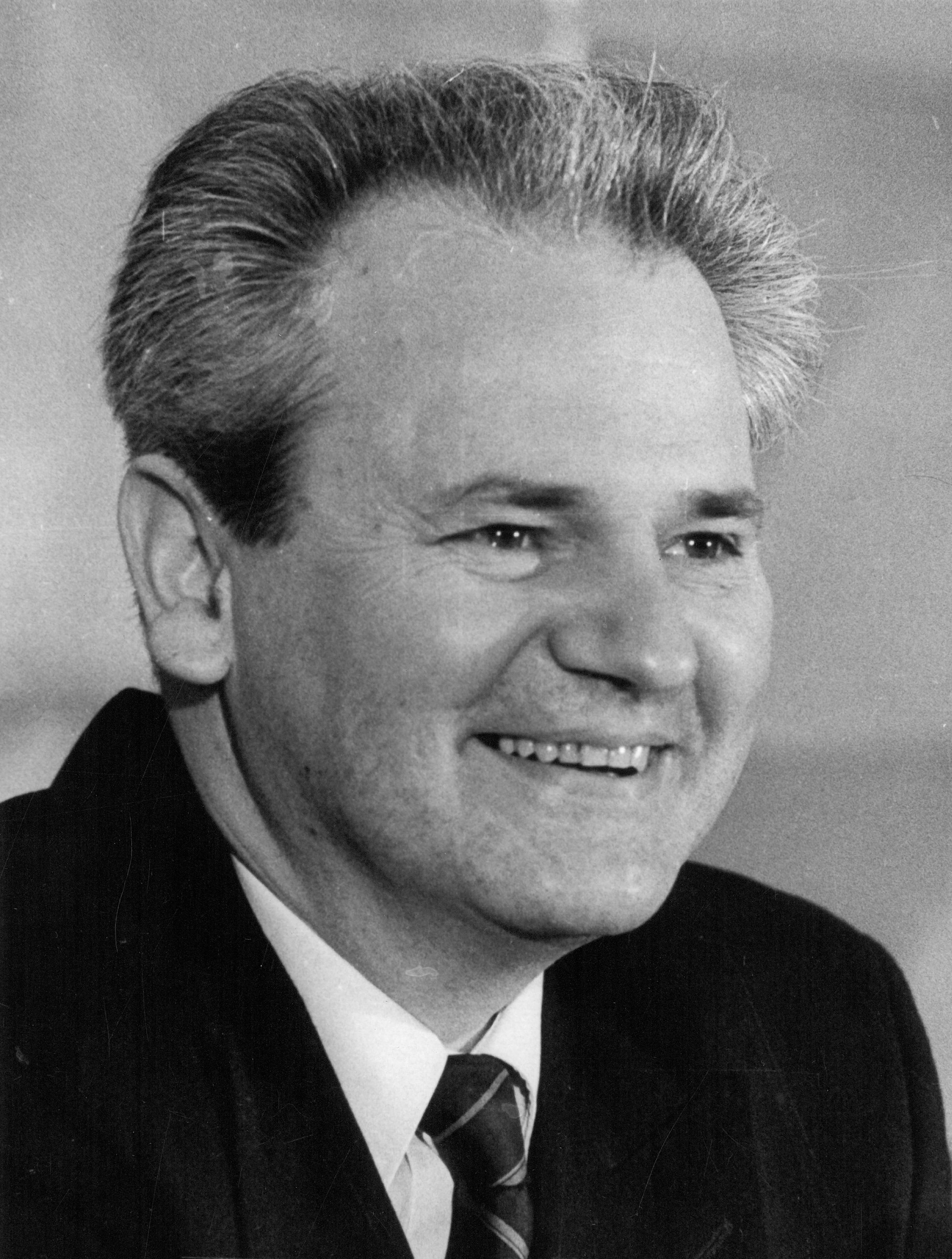
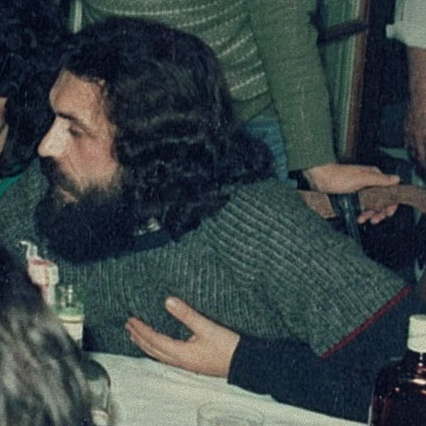
Milošević and Vuk Drašković were the leading presidential candidates during the campaign

External videos
- Sricanje demokratije – izbori 1990. The Radio Television of Serbia documentary on the 1990 elections which includes video material from the campaign period and interviews of political figures and experts in 2020

The election campaign began on 28 September, when the president of the National Assembly called for the elections to be held. According to Bojan Klačar of the Centre for Free Elections and Democracy (CeSID), "SPS entered the elections with such a large infrastructure inherited from the League of Communists that it could not have serious competition" (SPS je ušao u izbore sa toliko velikom infrastrukturom nasleđenom od Saveza komunista da nije mogao imati ozbiljnu konkurenciju). The infrastructure that SPS gained after its formation was worth approximately US$160 million, giving SPS an immeasurable advantage. The fairness of the election was questioned by opposition parties since the campaign began. Anti-government protests, mainly orchestrated by SPO and DS under the umbrella of the United Opposition of Serbia (UOS), were held during the campaign period, protesting against unfair treatment of the opposition on the RTB.

Milošević and Drašković were the leading presidential candidates during the campaign period, with Milošević considered to be the favourite. SPS and its precursor had already adopted nationalist rhetoric when Milošević came to power in 1987. NIN described the campaign as taking place under "extraordinarily dramatic circumstances" (izvanredno dramatičnim okolnostima). The New York Times called the election conclusive because of Serbia's role within Yugoslavia, while the Los Angeles Times stated that "the election also provides a last chance for Yugoslavia to reconsider its headlong rush toward disintegration and civil war". According to the Toronto Star, the elections "may determine, to a large extent, the future make-up or breakup of Yugoslavia", while The Washington Post said that "the survival of Yugoslavia may well be at stake" in the Serbian elections. Shortly before the election, the San Francisco Chronicle predicted that Serbia "is expected to remain staunchly Communist" after the elections. The Seattle Times considered the presidential election to be the most important one that year in Yugoslavia. By the end of the campaign, the Serbian opposition, Croatia, Slovenia, and Western countries viewed Drašković as a more acceptable option as president than Milošević.

Throughout the campaign, opposition candidates lacked funding and infrastructure. Most opposition parties lacked skilled or motivated members, activists, financial resources, and other infrastructure required to run an effective campaign. Publicist Zlatoje Martinov claimed that the campaign was unfair because the media heavily backed SPS while harshly criticising opposition politicians.

Both SPO and DS claimed to have tight relations with the Serb Democratic Party (SDS) of Radovan Karadžić during the campaign. The Veterans' Union also expressed its support for SPS, stating that "SPS is the only party that can oppose the right-wing and nationalist elements and mediaeval darkness, Albanian separatism, and Vojvodina autonomism" (SPS je jedina stranka koja se može susprotstaviti desničarskoj i nacionalističkoj stihiji i srednjovekovnom mraku, albanskom separatizmu i vojvođanskom autonomaštvu).

=== Slogans ===
The table below lists slogans that political parties employed during the campaign. Nikola Šainović, an SPS official and future prime minister of Serbia, stated that "we believed in that slogan" (mi smo u tu parolu verovali) and that "it was not just a marketing slogan, there was practically no marketing then, it was a real political slogan" (to nije bila samo marketinška parola, tada marketnga praktično nije ni bilo, to je bila prava politička parola). The SPS slogan "there is no uncertainty with us" (sa nama nema neizvesnosti) was also featured on their election posters. Mićunović said that "that slogan spoke of our desire to say that we were wrong a lot, so it's time to decide wisely" (ta parola je govorila o našoj želji da kažemo da smo dosta grešili, pa je vreme da prelomimo pametno). SPO used slogan acronyms, with the first letters of the words in Serbian spelling out their abbreviations.

Political party	Original slogan	English translation	Ref(s)
Democratic Party	Vreme je Prelomite pametno	The time has come Decide wisely	
Serbian Renewal Movement	Snaga, pobeda, obnova Sigurnost, promena, obnova Sutra počinje odmah	Strength, victory, renewal Security, change, renewal Tomorrow begins immediately	
Socialist Party of Serbia	Sa nama nema neizvesnosti Srbija se saginjati neće	There is no uncertainty with us Serbia will not bend down	
United Opposition of Serbia	Pobedili smo!	We won!	

=== Media promotion ===
Klačar argued that political communication was free during the campaign period; political scientist Jovanka Matić, in CeSID's Mediji i izbori (Media and Elections) book, stated that there was no equal treatment of election participants and that the 1990 elections were characterised by "apsolute supremacy of the state media" (apsolutna prevlast državnih medija). "Since the first pluralist parliamentary elections in 1990, the media presentation of the elections was not adapted to the needs of the voters, but to the needs of the parties, and above all to the needs of the ruling party" (Od prvih pluralističkih parlamentarnih izbora 1990. godine, medijska prezentacija izbora nije bila prilagođena potrebama birača, već potrebama partija, i pre svega potrebama vladajuće partije), Matić said. Opposition parties were also faced with a media blockade; Studio B and Radio B92 were the sole opposition-friendly media during the 1990 elections. Both, however, were limited to the Belgrade region. SPS controlled the majority of television and radio stations, as well as newspapers. During the campaign, SPS used the media to attack their political opponents and discredit presidential candidates, particularly Drašković. Mićunović, unlike Drašković, was not a presidential candidate and hence faced fewer media attacks.

The state media portrayed SPS as a state-building party, the sole advocate of Serbia's national interests, and the party of peace. They often portrayed Milošević and SPS as being identified with the state; this gave Milošević and other government officials a lot of publicity during the campaign. On the other hand, the opposition was portrayed as "promoters of war, conflict, bloodshed, and violence" (zagovornik rata, sukoba, krvoprolića, nasilja) and offering "chaos and mindlessness, destruction, political dependence on others, regression, and return to the past" (haos i bezumlje, razaranje, političku zavisnost od drugih i nazadovanje, vraćanje u prošlost). The government called opposition politicians as "enemies of society" (neprijateljima društva).

RTB presented candidates for the parliamentary and presidential elections during the election campaign. Candidates were given 90 minutes of television airtime on RTB, with the first 30 allocated minutes reserved for how candidates wished to present themselves. There was another television show on RTB that focused on campaign activities. It was noted that Đurić's presentation in November was cut from 30 minutes to 17 minutes due to a "musical interlude" and "the presenter's lengthy introduction". Mila Štula, a RTB journalist, also characterised Drašković as "a man with a clerical and Khomeini mentality who is also unsuitable for the head of state because he has no children" (čoveka pisarskog i homeinijevskog mentaliteta, koji je uz to nepogodan za vođu države jer nema dece). During Drašković's presentation on 2 December, RTB turned his words around; Drašković said, "when we come to power, we will provide minimum conditions for people, primarily pensioners, for a normal life. For example, when those people die, they do not even have money for a coffin; they cannot be buried like people, which is a very sad truth" (Mi ćemo, kada dođemo na vlast, obezbediti minimalne uslove ljudima, pre svega penzionerima za normalan život. Na primer, ti ljudi kada umru nemaju para ni za kovčeg, ne mogu da se maltene sahrane kao ljudi, što je vrlo tužna istina), while RTB interpreted his presentation as him wanting to provide all pensioners with coffins. Drašković's comments received backlash from the public. Štula also accused Drašković of owning a villa. While Milošević was invited to give a presentation on RTB, he refused to do so because the timeslot for his presentation would replace the play Solunci govore (Thessalonians speak).

A group of 200 journalists from state-controlled media protested on 6 December, demanding press freedom and the resignation of senior officials from RTB and Politika Publishing House. Miloš Vasić, a former Politika journalist, said that the "news coverage has been especially distorted during campaigning" and that "[Ante] Marković's party was completely ignored".

=== Issues ===
The campaign focused on issues such as Kosovo, nationalism, the transformation of the Yugoslav federation, social and economic prosperity, and democracy. Throughout the campaign, opposition parties focused on ideological themes. Milošević and Drašković pledged to reform the economy in line with Western standards. However, economic issues were not central to the campaign; rather, nationalism was the primary issue. The campaign was met with high social polarisation and fear, as well as politically motivated incidents. Slobodan Ivanović, an SPO activist, was killed in Dubnica, near Vranje, by a SPS supporter while campaigning just before the campaign ended on 5 December. Drašković accused SPS of attempting to instigate a civil war following the murder.

In the October 1990 opinion poll done by the Institute for Political Studies in Belgrade, 33% of the respondents ranked living standards and economic development as their important issues, with preservation of Yugoslavia coming in second. The majority of respondents wanted to remain in a federal Yugoslavia. In November, 35% of the respondents said that living standards and economic development were their most important issues. In the December poll, this issue was agreed upon by 39% of the respondents, with environmental issues ranking second.

=== Timeline ===
On 12 September, UOS held a protest in Belgrade, which was attended by about 50,000 demonstrators. They demanded a ninety-day election campaign, more television airtime for opposition parties, and representation of the opposition in bodies that oversee the elections. At the end of the protest, Šešelj and his supporters tried to seize the protest. Once the election was called, SPO organised a protest at Kosovo Polje. Due to SPS supporters organising a counter-protest, violence was on the verge of happening, though the police intervened and the protest remained peaceful.

Throughout the campaign period, there were discussions about orchestrating an election boycott. Drašković and his SPO were the first to initiate a boycott on 2 October. SPO proclaimed a boycott on the grounds that the election would be unfair, and demanded that it be rescheduled for 27 December. Mićunović and Zoran Đinđić were opposed to a boycott; Mićunović said that, in case of a boycott, opposition parties would "leave a clear space for the existing government, and we would deprive our own sympathisers of the opportunity to choose" (ostavljamo čist prostor postojećoj vlasti, a sopstvene simpatizere lišavamo mogućnosti da biraju). After DS decided to take part in the elections, Čavoški left the party; he formed the Serbian Liberal Party in 1991. Đinđić succeeded Čavoški as the president of the executive board of DS. Dragan Veselinov, the president of NSS, said that his party would take part in the elections, while the NRS was also opposed to a boycott.

In-mid November, discussions about an election boycott intensified. The government refused to implement the opposition's revisions to the election law, which included demands such as representation of the opposition in RIK and local commissions. Initially, 11 parties announced in mid-November that they would boycott the elections; the number soon increased to 19. Most opposition parties, including SPO, DS, SRSJ, SNO, NRS, ND, and LS, together with presidential candidates Drašković and Đurić, proclaimed an election boycott and withdrew their candidatures. They were also concerned about potential vote fraud if they chose to participate. By 25 November, around 40 parties had announced their decision to boycott the election. The government of Serbia believed that a boycott would undermine international acceptance of the election results; Milošević also criticised parties that proclaimed the boycott. He accused the "rightist conservatives and often dark forces" (desnih konzervativnih i često sasvim mračnih snaga) of trying to bring Serbia "to the past, to bring it into chaos" (u prošlost, da je uvuku u haos). The government eventually accepted the recommendations on 26 November, and the boycott was cancelled. However, the government refused to postpone the elections to 23 December or permit overseas Serbians to vote. Drašković said that "some effort was made towards a reasonable solution" (učinjen je izvestan napor ka razumnom rešenju) and that SPO would not boycott the elections.

==== Serbian Renewal Movement ====
Drašković, a right-wing nationalist, portrayed the election as a struggle "between good and evil". He earned the moniker "King of the Squares" (kralj trgova) for his inflammatory and provocative rhetoric during the election campaign; his public image was also compared to Rasputin because of his beard and hair. His campaign events were described as a "mixture of Rasputin and rock concerts". During the campaign, Drašković took a tough approach towards Kosovo and Serbs in other Yugoslav constituent republics. He also backed free-market capitalism and the restoration of the monarchy. He proposed a "seven-day solution" for Kosovo, requiring Kosovo Albanians to sign a "Serbian loyalty oath or get out [of Kosovo]" or face military intervention. During his campaign rally in early October in Novi Pazar, he criticised Muslims and Croats. "Anyone who, in this land of Raška, holds a Turkish flag, an Ustaša flag, an Albanian flag, or anyone else's flag except the Serbian flag, will be left without a hand and without a flag" (svaki onaj ko u ruku, ovom Raškom zemljom, stegne turski barjak, ustaški barjak, albanski barjak ili bilo čiji drugi barjak sem srpskog, ostaće i bez ruke i bez barjaka), Drašković said. During the same period, he urged sending paramilitary units during the Log Revolution in Croatia.

In early November, Yugoslav Prime Minister Ante Marković and his SRSJ criticized the SPO, labeling it a greater threat than Milošević. In late November, Drašković accused Milošević of destabilising Yugoslavia, but dismissed allegations that SPO would overthrow the government. By the end of the campaign, Drašković moderated his rhetoric, and said that he would negotiate with Croatia and Slovenia to avoid Yugoslavia's disintegration. While he was opposed to the breakup of Yugoslavia, he favoured the concept of Greater Serbia. Drašković's last campaign event, attended by 15,000 people, was a commemorative rally for the murdered SPO activist.

==== Democratic Party ====
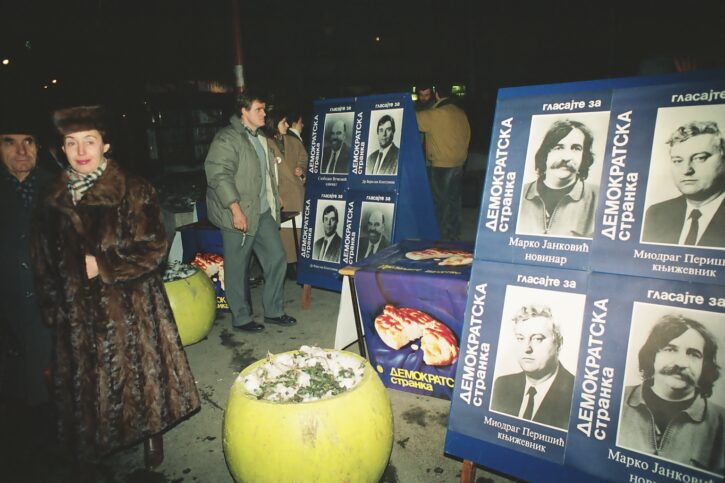
DS (four candidates pictured) campaigned on an economically liberal and pro-Western programme during the campaign

Mićunović stated that DS campaigned with limited infrastructure and was forced to use only direct methods of campaigning. DS campaigned on a technocratic, economically liberal-oriented, and pro-Western programme. In addition, they favoured a representative parliamentary democracy, as well as human and political freedoms and civic rights. Furthermore, they took a moderate approach towards Kosovo, opting to negotiate with Kosovo Albanians and wishing to preserve the Yugoslav federation. DS was a catch-all party and comprised ideologically diverse groupings, and unlike SPO, it did not use populist rhetoric. Political scientist Vukašin Pavlović and Metropolitan University Prague lecturer Marko Stojić positioned DS on the centre-right during the 1990 elections. DS received support from intellectuals during the election.

Đinđić said in early November that DS would concentrate on issues such as reprivatisation of the economy, personal freedoms and rights of citizens, and the issue of Serbia within Yugoslavia. DS did not campaign on nationalist themes. Vojislav Koštunica, the vice-president of DS, described the elections as "vital" and said that "without free elections, nothing can change in Yugoslavia". At the end of the campaign, Vladeta Janković said that DS would enter the government led by SPO in the event of a SPO victory.

==== Socialist Party of Serbia ====
SPS campaigned on a constructive agenda and positive themes, portraying itself as a democratic socialist party. In its first programme, issued in October, SPS stated that "Serbia as a socialist republic, founded on law and social justice" was its goal. Nevertheless, SPS relied heavily on a combination of nationalism and social demagogy in its rhetoric. Unlike other former communist parties, SPS did not abandon its authoritarian traits. SPS also promoted conspiracy theories during the campaign, such as the claim of a United States plot to destroy Serbia. Their president, Milošević, campaigned on presenting himself as a moderate, promising stability, defending Serbia's national interests, and preventing unemployment among industrial workers. Opposition parties criticised Milošević due to his former affiliation with SKS. Milošević advocated for maintaining the status quo and said that a civil war could break out if other constituent republics declared independence. Most of his supporters were frightened of a change to a market economy, political change, and Yugoslavia's breakup, while he opposed free-market policies and promoted protectionist measures instead. During the campaign period in October, the government of Serbia raised tariffs and introduced trade barriers to reduce imports from Croatia and Slovenia.

While campaigning in early November, Milošević criticised the opposition: "That path to a modern society and a developed society is incompatible with any mystical messages, which like ghosts of the past circulate in some parts of Serbia and which various false prophets and madmen offer to the Serbian people as a pledge of the future" (Taj put u moderno društvo i razvijeno društvo nespojiv je sa bilo kakvim mističkim porukama, koje kao aveti prošlosti kruže u nekim delovima Srbije i koje razni lažni proroci i ludaci nude srpskom narodu kao zalog budućnosti). Throughout the rest of the month, he intensified his presidential campaign. He later said that "a Socialist defeat could unleash dark forces from the country's past". In the final campaign week, Milošević gave a choreographed speech in Novi Sad; workers from state-owned factories were given the afternoon off and sent to Milošević's rally. After the rally, the supporters were bussed back home. Despite only 15,000 people attending the rally, the state-controlled media reported the number to be between 75,000 and 150,000. His last campaign event was held on 5 December.

==== Others ====
Among the numerous opposition groups and politicians who rose to prominence during the campaign, the Association for the Yugoslav Democratic Initiative (UJDI) expressed its opposition to confederalism, instead advocating an accord on the formation of a multi-party Assembly of Yugoslavia. The nominee of UJDI and SRSJ was Ivan Đurić; he campaigned on a moderate, liberal, and pro-European programme and received support from the West. Đurić strongly rejected nationalism and favoured a dialogue between Serbs and Albanians. SRSJ got support exclusively in Vojvodina, but not in the rest of Serbia. During the campaign period, Šešelj was initially sentenced to prison on 2 October due to offences regarding public order and peace. He was later released but soon re-imprisoned on October 23 for 45 days for allegedly attempting to recruit volunteers for Croatia's Log Revolution. His SČP was not permitted to take part in the elections. DS condemned Šešelj's imprisonment. In late October, Nenad Čanak, the president of League of Social Democrats of Vojvodina/Yugoslavia, condemned the 1988 anti-bureaucratic revolution in Vojvodina in a campaign interview.

Đurić criticised both the SPS and nationalist anti-communists during the campaign in November, arguing that "if we want to join Europe, [...] we need a moderate, authentic, democratic position" (ukoliko želimo u Evropu, [...] potrebna nam je umerena, autentična, demokratska pozicija). After Šešelj left prison in November, he launched his presidential campaign; he strongly criticised other opposition parties such as SPO. However, he thanked DS for supporting his release and said that SČP would consider endorsing the candidates of DS in the parliamentary election. Shortly before the election, Šešelj emphasised his support for monarchism and named the SRSJ and the League of Communists – Movement for Yugoslavia as the "two new evils" (dva nova zla). Out of the minor candidates, Nikola Šećeroski, a plastic artist, received the most attention. During an interview for RTB, for which he is remembered, Šećeroski said that the municipality of Čukarica accused him of making "brushes and brooms" (četke i metle), despite being a plastic artist. He has been described as a symbol of "ridiculing and making the democratic process meaningless" (ismevanje i obesmišljavanja demokratskog procesa). Ćuić, a driving instructor and poet, was not politically active prior to the election. In the election, she was nominated on behalf of a citizens group. Ćuić did not run an active campaign but participated in television programmes. "Whoever throws a cigarette butt on the street has done evil to all mankind" (Ko baci opušak na ulicu, učinio je zlo celom čovečanstvu), Ćuić once said during the campaign. Out of all independent candidates for the parliamentary election, Milićević campaigned on improving children's rights and the rights of the elderly, as well as expanding the number of kindergartens, schools, and parks. Subota criticised the poor conditions that independent candidates had to endure during the election campaign.

Veselinov said that opposition forces would unite should a second round of the presidential election take place. For the second round of the parliamentary elections, opposition parties united under the UOS banner. UOS was officially formalised on 11 December. Its members included SPO, DS, SRSJS, NSS, NS, ND, NRS, and UJDI. UOS called for its voters to vote for opposition candidates in the second round "regardless of their political affiliation" (nezavisno od njegove stranačke pripadnosti). Due to its heterogeneous nature, UOS only advocated for the establishment of parliamentarism and the introduction of a proportional representation system. Šešelj declined to join the coalition, though he personally endorsed DS candidates.

== Opinion polls ==
Opinion polling for the 1990 general election in Serbia was conducted by the Institute for Political Studies in Belgrade, Institute of Social Sciences and Centre for Political Research, and one unknown independent polling firm. (Note: Institute of Social Sciences and Centre for Political Research polls: December 1990; November 1990; October 1990; Institute for Political Studies in Belgrade poll: December 1990; Unknown independent polling firm poll: September 1990) According to Washington Post, opinion polls were not very reliable during the 1990 elections.

=== Graphical summary ===
The graph below showcases major parties and candidates in opinion polls during the 1990 election campaign period.

Local regression chart of poll results for the parliamentary and presidential elections from September to 9 December 1990

== Conduct ==
The election observers included 170 international journalists and 65 members from monitoring organisations. Despite the opposition's claims of electoral fraud, election observers gave the elections a transitional rating and declared them free. RIK dismissed the allegations of voter fraud. The opposition later conceded, expressing surprise and disappointment with the outcome.

According to the National Republican Institute for International Affairs, the election was fair, but observers complained about "bias and favouritism in media coverage". Zoran Hodzera, who monitored on behalf of the Americans and Canadians of Serbia delegation, stated that the "elections would not be considered legal in the West" due to irregularities that occurred. Matić said that the election was held under unequal conditions. Political scientist Nebojša Vladisaljević argued that the election was competitive but neither free nor fair.

Claims of electoral fraud included ballot stuffing, abuse of postal votes, manipulation in vote counting, and attempts to undermine the credibility of the elections. Hodzera said that the number of voters increased immediately before the elections, some voters voted without their ID cards, the government intimidated voters, and state-run media was biased against the opposition during the campaign. The newspaper Vreme also made similar observations, in addition to ballot stuffing and the inclusion of deceased voters on the electoral roll. Political scientist Vladimir Goati reported that while the irregularities occurred – which included unauthorised changes to the electoral roll which favoured SPS candidates – only a few were recorded. According to political scientist Dušan Pavlović, vote buying was the most widespread during the 1990 elections.

== Results ==
Unlike in most post-communist countries after the Revolutions of 1989 and constituent republics of Yugoslavia, the elections in Serbia were won by the incumbent. In comparison, the elections in Slovenia, Croatia, Bosnia and Herzegovina, and Macedonia were won by anti-communists. RIK published preliminary results of the elections on 10 December. The Republic Bureau of Statistics published the full results in January 1991.

=== Presidential election ===
There were 7,033,610 citizens who were eligible to vote in the presidential elections. Out of 9,013 voting stations, voting took place at 8,587 voting stations. At 22 voting stations, voting had to be repeated. The turnout for the election was 71%. Milošević won the presidential election in a landslide, while Drašković only won 16% of the popular vote. Observers were shocked, as they had expected Drašković to receive strong support. Đurić came third place, only winning just over 5% of the popular vote. Milošević, Drašković, and Đurić received more votes than their parties in the parliamentary elections, respectively. Sulejman Ugljanin of the SDA received over 100,000 votes. As Milošević won a majority of the popular vote, a second round was not held.

Candidate	Party	Votes	%
Slobodan Milošević	Socialist Party of Serbia	3,285,799	67.71
Vuk Drašković	Serbian Renewal Movement	824,674	16.99
Ivan Đurić	SRSJS–UJDI	277,398	5.72
Sulejman Ugljanin	Party of Democratic Action from Novi Pazar	109,459	2.26
Vojislav Šešelj	Independent	96,277	1.98
Blažo Perović	YU Bloc	57,420	1.18
Slobodan Matić	Alliance of All Serbs of the World	28,978	0.60
Dragan Jovanović	Green Party	22,458	0.46
Ljuben Alen Aleksov	Independent	19,123	0.39
Ljubomir Grujić	Independent	17,675	0.36
Milan Lazarević	Independent	11,034	0.23
Tihomir Živanović	Independent	9,892	0.20
Jovan Koprivica	Independent	9,677	0.20
Miodrag Gojković	Party of Independent Businessmen "Zapis"	9,262	0.19
Tomislav Krsmanović	Movement for the Protection of Human Rights	8,095	0.17
Živan Haravan	Party of Social Justice	7,791	0.16
Velimir Cvetić	Social Democratic Party of Yugoslavia	6,575	0.14
Milan Mladenović	Independent	6,459	0.13
Miroslav Veselinović	Independent	6,180	0.13
Nikola Barović	Independent	5,355	0.11
Predrag Vuletić	Liberal Party	5,019	0.10
Ratimir Vojvodić	Independent	4,414	0.09
Ljiljana Ćuić	Independent	3,764	0.08
Milorad Radović	Independent	3,425	0.07
Saša Goranci	Independent	3,409	0.07
Nikola Šećeroski	Independent	3,168	0.07
Čedomir Nešić	Independent	2,553	0.05
Slobodan Ranković	Independent	2,425	0.05
Radivoje Šaranac	Republican Party	1,918	0.04
Jovan Stojković	Independent	1,154	0.02
Miomir Tošić	Independent	904	0.02
Hercen Radonjić	Independent	847	0.02
Total		4,852,581	100.00
Valid votes		4,852,581	96.63
Invalid/blank votes		169,461	3.37
Total votes		5,022,042	100.00
Registered voters/turnout		7,033,610	71.40
Source: Republic Bureau of Statistics, Official Gazette of the Republic of Serbia

=== Parliamentary election ===
There were 7,036,303 citizens who were eligible to vote in the first round of the parliamentary elections; in the second round, there were 4,352,573. In the first round, voting took place at 8,595 out of 9,013 voting stations, while in the second round, voting took place at 4,507 out of 4,906 voting stations. In the first round of the parliamentary election, 96 members were elected, while the rest, 154 members, were elected in the second round. The voter turnout in the first round was reported to be 71%, the highest of any parliamentary election in Serbia since then. In the second round, the turnout was 48%. While the turnout in other Yugoslav republics was higher, the turnout of 71% in the first round largely resulted from Kosovo Albanians boycotting the election.

The election resulted in a landslide victory for Milošević's SPS, winning 194 out of 250 seats in the National Assembly. Despite not winning the popular vote, SPS received 78% of seats in the National Assembly due to the first-past-the-post system. The SPO, in second place, won 19 seats, while the DS, in third place, won 7 seats. Minority parties won 14 seats, and independents won 8. Out of all minority parties, the Democratic Fellowship of Vojvodina Hungarians (VMDK) won the most seats, 8 in total. Liberal parties, such as DS, and social-democratic parties, such as SDPJ, did not garner a lot of support compared to other post-communist countries. Only two women were elected to the National Assembly.

Goati argued that the SPS won due to Serbia's economic underdevelopment and its electoral system. He also argued that state-controlled media campaigns against opposition parties also helped SPS in the campaign. Political scientist Srećko Mihailović argued that the mixture of nationalism and socialism resulted in the SPS victory.

Voting was repeated at 3 voting stations on 16 December. A by-election was held in June 1991 due to the death of Miodrag Bulatović, elected with the nomination of SPS. Šešelj of SRS, Pekić of DS, Jovan Marjanović of SPO, and Radoš Karaklajić of SPS were the election's candidates. Despite the SPS nominating its own candidate, Milošević gave campaign infrastructure to Šešelj instead. Šešelj was eventually elected a member in the second round.

Party	Votes	%	Seats		
Party	Votes	%	First round	Second round	Total
Socialist Party of Serbia	2,320,587	48.15	87	107	194
Serbian Renewal Movement	794,786	16.49	0	19	19
Democratic Party	374,887	7.78	0	7	7
Democratic Fellowship of Vojvodina Hungarians	132,726	2.75	5	3	8
Party of Democratic Action of Sandžak	84,156	1.75	3	0	3
Union of Reform Forces of Yugoslavia for Vojvodina	74,748	1.55	0	2	2
People's Peasant Party	68,045	1.41	0	1	1
New Democracy – Movement for Serbia	67,356	1.40	0	0	0
People's Radical Party	63,041	1.31	0	0	0
Party of the Union of Peasants of Serbia	52,663	1.09	0	2	2
Serbian National Renewal	40,359	0.84	0	0	0
Serb Democratic Party	32,927	0.68	0	1	1
Green Party	32,007	0.66	0	0	0
Union of Reform Forces of Yugoslavia in Serbia	27,358	0.57	0	0	0
Association for the Yugoslav Democratic Initiative	24,982	0.52	0	1	1
Democratic Alliance of Croats in Vojvodina	23,630	0.49	0	1	1
Party for Democratic Action	21,998	0.46	1	0	1
Party of Yugoslavs	21,784	0.45	0	1	1
Party of Independent Entrepreneurs and Peasants	13,778	0.29	0	0	0
Workers' Party of Yugoslavia	13,774	0.29	0	0	0
Serbian Saint Sava Party	9,169	0.19	0	0	0
Liberal Party	7,325	0.15	0	0	0
Social Democratic Party of Roma of Serbia	6,491	0.13	0	0	0
League for Pančevo – Party of Moderate Progress	6,034	0.13	0	0	0
Movement for the Protection of Human Rights	4,835	0.10	0	0	0
Peasant-Workers' Party of Serbia	4,802	0.10	0	0	0
Party of Independent Businessmen "Zapis"	4,381	0.09	0	0	0
Democratic Forum	4,172	0.09	0	0	0
New Communist Movement of Yugoslavia	4,017	0.08	0	0	0
Party of National Accord	3,838	0.08	0	0	0
Party of Independent Democrats of Serbia	3,486	0.07	0	0	0
Democratic Reform Party of Muslims	3,432	0.07	0	1	1
Yugoslav Socialist Democratic Party	3,026	0.06	0	0	0
Serbian Royalist Bloc	2,966	0.06	0	0	0
Democratic Alliance of Turks	1,842	0.04	0	0	0
Social Democratic Party of Yugoslavia	1,528	0.03	0	0	0
Serbian School Youth Party	1,368	0.03	0	0	0
Unknown Proposer	1,137	0.02	0	0	0
Democratic Party (Davidović – Grol)	1,022	0.02	0	0	0
All-Serb People's Movement	826	0.02	0	0	0
Democratic Party of Freedom	707	0.01	0	0	0
Democratic Political Party of Roma – Kragujevac	543	0.01	0	0	0
Republican Party	480	0.01	0	0	0
Independents	456,318	9.47	0	8	8
Total	4,819,337	100.00	96	154	250
Valid votes	4,819,337	95.94			
Invalid/blank votes	204,018	4.06			
Total votes	5,023,355	100.00			
Registered voters/turnout	7,036,303	71.39			
Source: Republic Bureau of Statistics and Mihailović et al., 1991

=== Voter demographics ===
A majority of the working class voted for SPS in the 1990 election. Academics Dragomir Pantić and Zoran Pavlović analysed the demographics of the three major parties during the 1990 elections. According to them, SPS voters were characterised by authoritarianism, nationalism, irreligiousness, and nostalgia for socialism; DS voters were characterised by anti-authoritarianism, nationalism, irreligiosity, and rare nostalgia for socialism; and SPO voters were characterised by mild authoritarianism, nationalism, religiousity, and an absence of nostalgia for socialism. Political scientist Srbobran Branković said that SPS voters included the elderly, those with lower education, such as pensioners, housewives, and peasants, and workers spanning from the unqualified to highly qualified workers. Regarding the opposition, their voters included younger generations and those with higher education, such as students, professors, intellectuals, and private entrepreneurs. According to Martinov, 28% of SPS voters advocated for an authoritarian regime, and 33% espoused social justice. According to the Institute of Social Sciences, SPS voters were the most authoritarian, while DS voters were the most libertarian. Regarding presidential candidates, supporters of Milošević espoused the highest amounts of authoritarianism, while supporters of Đurić and Šešelj were the most libertarian.

Mihailović, who analysed the Institute of Social Studies and Centre for Political Research polls, saw that SPS voters were either from suburban parts or villages and mostly from the Central Serbia region. Most SPS voters were elderly and elementary school educated, and a majority of them identified themselves on the left-wing part of the political spectrum. Most SPO voters, primarily male, high-school educated, and from middle-sized cities in Central Serbia, identified as politically right-leaning, with 26% considering themselves centrist. DS voters were young, lived in cities, and were highly educated. Most DS voters saw themselves in the political centre.

The Institute of Social Studies and Centre for Political Research poll conducted in December also listed the influence of voter results in the election; 28.7% said that radio had little influence on them, while 12.7% said that it had "a great deal" of influence on them. On the other hand, television impacted most voters, while the press had little influence on the outcome of their voting. Most of the voters had already known who they would vote for since the beginning, with 16.4% also stating that they formed their decision during the election campaign. Regarding the political positioning of voters, 28.4% identified as centrist, 21.6% as mildly left, 11.1% as mildly right, 9.6% as centre-left, 6.4% as extreme-left, 5.6% as centre-right, and 2.8% as extreme-right. Most of the voters favoured closer relations with the European Economic Community, while 28.4% opted for a strictly neutral policy.

== Reactions ==
Šešelj was the first candidate to congratulate Milošević once the results were announced. Milošević was also felicitated by Ante Marković and Franjo Tuđman, the newly elected president of Croatia. Đurić claimed that Milošević did not win 50% of the popular vote and that the results from opposition candidates were subtracted from and added on top of Milošević's result.

Vreme reported that opposition leaders were "in a state of shock for about 20 hours" (gotovo dvadeset sati bili u šoku). Drašković said after the elections that "citizens voted for restraints, for Bolshevism, for the past, for darkness, and for shame" (građani glasali za stege, za boljševizam, za prošlost, za mrak i za sramotu), and initially said that SPO might not accept the results. He also claimed that he had wished for such exact results. Đinđić described the voters as not having heard of the fall of the Berlin Wall. Dragan Jovanović, the president of ZS, said that his party was disappointed and that "the people got what they deserved" (narod je dobio ono što je zaslužio). Nebojša Popov from UJDI compared the election to the pre-World War II Weimar Germany elections. Dušan Mihajlović of ND was more optimistic, saying that "the battle for true democracy has just begun" (bitka za pravu demokratiju je tek počela). Albanian LDK rejected recognising the legitimacy of the elections.

The poll conducted by the Institute for Political Studies in Belgrade saw 55% of the respondents satisfied with the results of the presidential election, with 22% also being neither satisfied nor unsatisfied, while 21% said that they were unsatisfied with the results. Regarding the parliamentary elections, 37% were satisfied, 33% were unsatisfied, and 28% were neither satisfied nor unsatisfied. 26.5% of the respondents said that the election would somewhat influence their future lives, and 22% said that it would not at all influence their future lives; 32% did not know.

== Aftermath ==
=== Government formation ===
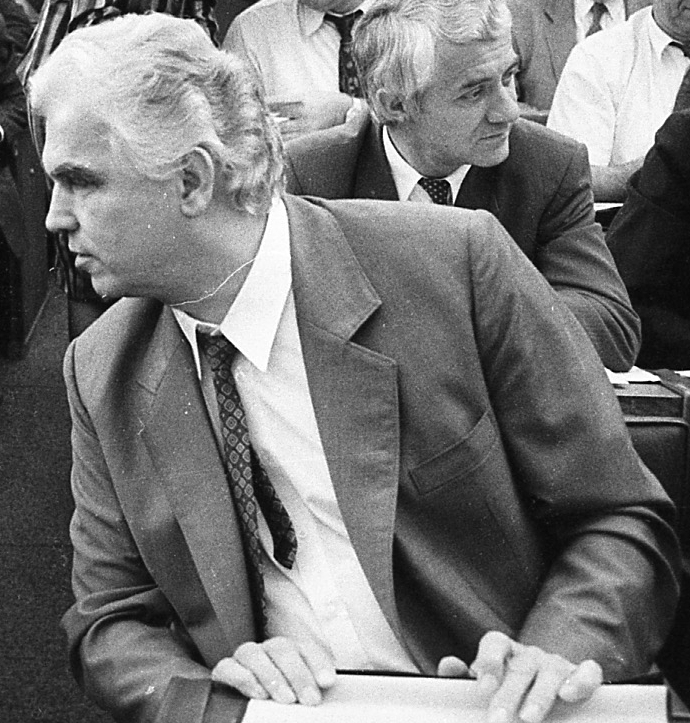
Dragutin Zelenović was elected prime minister of Serbia after the 1990 election

The National Assembly was constituted on 11 January 1991. Since 10 members of parliament (MPs) were needed to form a parliamentary group, only the SPS and SPO were able to do so. DS, VMDK, and several independents united to form their own group. Slobodan Unković was elected as the president of the National Assembly. Unković remained in that position until his resignation in June, stating that he was worn out and wanted to return to the academic sphere. He was succeeded by Aleksandar Bakočević, who remained in that position until the 1992 elections.

With the conclusion of the 1990 elections, Serbia turned from a one-party system to a competitive authoritarian multi-party system. Sotirović also said that political scientists considered the system to be authoritarian during the process of the dissolution of Yugoslavia; Goati defined it as a dominant-party system. Considering that SPS obtained a supermajority in the National Assembly, the next government of Serbia was led solely by SPS. Dragutin Zelenović was elected prime minister of Serbia by the National Assembly in February 1991. He served in the office until December 1991, when his government was replaced by the cabinet led by Radoman Božović. Both governments included SPS and independent ministers.

=== 1991 protests ===
The first major anti-government protest after the 1990 elections was held on 9 March 1991 in Belgrade. The main organiser of the protest was SPO, though other opposition parties also took part. The protest was organised in response to the media's treatment of the opposition, with SPO calling for the resignation of senior officials of RTB. RTB previously alleged in February 1991 that SPO cooperated "with the far pro-fascistic and pro-Ustaša Croatia" (sa krajnjom profašističkom i proustaškom Hrvatskom). Drašković, alongside Đinđić, Mićunović, Vesna Pešić of SRSJ, and Milan Paroški of NS, expressed his demands from the balcony of the National Theatre, As the Serbian government sought JNA intervention, Borisav Jović convinced other constituent republics by claiming that demonstrators were attempting to seize the Yugoslav General Staff building and that the police had been dispersed and were unable to manage the protest. Slovenia, Croatia, Macedonia, and Bosnia and Herzegovina opposed JNA's intervention in the protest, while Serbia, Montenegro, Kosovo, and Vojvodina were in favour. Kadijević eventually allowed JNA to intervene in the protests, and tanks were brought to the streets of Belgrade for the first time since 1944.

The intervention of JNA and the police left one demonstrator and one policeman dead. About 200 demonstrators were left injured. In response to the protest, the government banned Radio B92, censured Studio B, and detained Drašković. Milošević declared that the demonstrators were the "forces of chaos and violence" (silama haosa i nasilja). According to the reports of the police, about 40,000 demonstrators were present at the 9 March protest. A day later, another protest was organised, this time with students also taking part in the protest. A group of 5,000 students marched from Studentski Grad towards Terazije, but were stopped and beaten by the police at the Branko's Bridge. The police eventually allowed the students to continue towards Terazije. JNA withdrew from the streets on the same day. Amidst the protests, the National Assembly held a session, while the Presidency of Yugoslavia decided not to proclaim a state of emergency in Serbia. The protests were held continuously until 14 March, when the government conceded to the demands of the organisers. Dušan Mitević, the director of RTB, was sacked, Radio B92 and Studio B were allowed to continue their operations, and all detainees, including Drašković, were set free. The editorial policy of RTB, however, remained the same and continued to show SPS in a positive light while criticising the opposition. In late March, UOS organised a protest, demanding snap elections, a change of government, and the investigation of 9–14 March protests.

=== Yugoslav Wars ===
The process of the breakup of Yugoslavia escalated after the Serbian elections, with Milošević continuing to espouse conspiracy theories and allegations, such as that Warren Zimmermann, the last U.S. ambassador to Yugoslavia, was an agent of the Central Intelligence Agency, that Slovenia, Austria, and Hungary sought to re-establish the Austria-Hungarian Empire, and that there was an international plot to destroy Serbia. The Foreign Affairs reported that none of the six constituent republics paid their full share of tax revenues to the government of Yugoslavia and that all republics, except Serbia and Montenegro, prioritised their sovereignty over the federation. The ethnic nationalist sentiment was also adopted by all leaders of Yugoslav constituent republics; Milošević portrayed the Serbs in Croatia as being on "the verge of extermination". Additionally, with the support of Milošević, the SAO Krajina was established by Serbs in Croatia.

Croatia and Slovenia moderated their stances in early 1991 mainly due to economic factors; the European Economic Community and International Monetary Fund both wanted to cooperate only with a united Yugoslavia. Because Tuđman still opted for a confederal Yugoslavia, he faced criticism within the right-wing factions of his party, the Croatian Democratic Union. Janez Drnovšek, who served as Slovenia's representative in the Yugoslav presidency, also said that Slovenia's independence could not be achieved unilaterally. Milošević eventually moderated his stances in March 1991 due to the protests. Despite this, Serb paramilitaries advanced and the Croatian War of Independence began in the same month. The Republic of Serbian Krajina was later established on the territory of Croatia in December 1991. Later in April 1992, the Bosnian War also began, after Bosnia and Herzegovina proclaimed independence.

After the announcement that the European Economic Community would recognise Slovenia and Croatia, Milošević declared the formation of a "third Yugoslavia" which included Serbia, Montenegro, and Krajina. In February 1992, Serbia and Montenegro only agreed to continue existing as part of the same state; the Federal Republic of Yugoslavia was then created in April, and the SFRY formally ceased to exist. The new state was isolated and suspended from a number of international organisations, such as the United Nations. The United Nations also sanctioned FR Yugoslavia due to the wars in Croatia and Bosnia.

=== Snap elections ===
Dissatisfied with the results of the 1990 elections and believing they had greater public support, the opposition called for the government to hold a snap election. With the 1991 protests, the beginning of the Yugoslav Wars, the creation of FR Yugoslavia, and the introduction of sanctions on the newly established state, all parties agreed that snap elections should be held on all levels. Additionally, upon the proclamation of FR Yugoslavia, the government organised parliamentary elections for the Federal Parliament in May. The opposition boycotted the election in protest of the election laws and the unfair treatment of the media against the opposition. The government held a referendum in October 1992 on whether snap elections should be called in Serbia. The referendum was approved by the voters, though the turnout was only 46% of all registered voters, which was not enough for the decision to be considered legally valid. The government of Serbia then proposed a package of reforms, which the National Assembly adopted shortly after the referendum. Snap elections were then scheduled for 20 December 1992.

It was debated whether the first-past-the-post system should stay or if Serbia should adopt the proportional representation system. The government initially wanted the first-past-the-post system to stay. The election laws were ultimately amended and the proportional representation system was established; the number of constituencies was also lowered from 250 to 9 as a compromise. Under the new electoral system, the Belgrade constituency elected 46 MPs, Novi Sad elected 32 MPs, Kragujevac elected 29 MPs, Leskovac elected 25 MPs, Zrenjanin, Niš, Priština, and Užice all elected 24 MPs each, and Smederevo elected 22 MPs.

== Legacy ==
The Radio Television of Serbia published a documentary about the 1990 elections in 2020. The documentary featured politicians who took part in the 1990 elections, as well as political scientists and researchers. In the documentary, lawyer and SPS member Ratko Marković, who wrote the 1990 constitution, also explained the reason why multi-party elections were held after the constitutional referendum. "It was necessary to act quickly, primarily because of the situation regarding the autonomous provinces in our country, primarily Kosovo and Metohija" (Trebalo je brzo delovati, pre svega zbog situacije u vezi sa autonomnim pokrajinama kod nas, pre svega Kosovo i Metohija), Marković said.

Prizvan i pozvan (Invoked), a documentary on the 1990 elections was released in 2022. Produced by Luka Papić and Srđa Vučo, the documentary included comedy elements about the elections. The documentary featured Ćuić, Mladenović, Jovanović of ZS, as well as parliamentary candidate Savo Nešković of the Great Rock 'n' Roll Party. The documentary was screened at several festivals, including the International Documentary Film Festival Amsterdam, Subversive Festival, and Palić European Film Festival. It received the "Audience Award for the Best European Documentary Film" at the 2023 Beldocs Festival.
