= Ljiljana Ćuić =

Serbian poet and presidential candidate

- Љиљана Ћуић
- Born: 23 August 1956 (age 70); Priboj, PR Serbia, FPR Yugoslavia
- Education: University of Belgrade
- Known for: First woman to run for president of Serbia
- Political party: Party of Serbian Unity (formerly)

Ljiljana Ćuić (Serbian Cyrillic: Љиљана Ћуић; born 2 August 1956) is a Serbian poet who was a presidential candidate in the 1990 Serbian general election. She was the first woman to run for president of Serbia. Ćuić later had a role in the 2022 Prizvan i pozvan comedy-documentary about the 1990 elections.

== Early life ==
Ljiljana Ćuić was born on 2 August 1956, in Priboj, People's Republic of Serbia, Federal People's Republic of Yugoslavia. Her father, born in Broćanac, Kordun region of Yugoslavia, was a police officer. Ćuić attended a gymnasium in her hometown before moving to Belgrade to study pedagogy at the Faculty of Philosophy of the University of Belgrade.

== Career ==
After completing her education at the University of Belgrade, Ćuić pursued a career as a poet, writing patriotic poems. She also worked as a driving instructor at Crveni Signal (Red Signal). She said she instructed athlete Zoran Đurđević.

=== Presidential campaign ===
External videos
- Nikola Šećeroski i Ljiljana Ćuić u novogodišnjoj emisiji Vladimira Pavlova Dusa na TVNS 3P 1990. The 1990 New Year's Eve television show featuring Ćuić and Nikola Šećeroski

Ćuić was among the 32 presidential candidates in the 1990 Serbian general election. She was nominated on behalf of a citizens group (grupa građana) after gathering signatures from friends, driving school associates, and Red Star athletes. By participating in the election, she became Serbia's first presidential candidate. Ćuić was not politically active prior and after the election, saying that she entered the race with "a great desire to present myself to the people as a Serbian woman" (velika želja da se narodu predstavim kao Srpkinja) and because she "loved [Serbia], and I did not see that in other politicians" (volim [Srbiju], a videla sam da to nije slučaj sa ostalim političarima). Along with Nikola Šećeroski, she was hailed as "the most impressive figure of the 1990 elections" (najupečatljivija figura izbora 1990. godine). Her parents backed her presidential campaign.

She did not campaign during the election but was featured on television and radio. She gave her presentation on the Radio Television of Belgrade on 3 December. Prior to the elections, she held Yugoslavist ideas, but during and after the 1990 elections, she embraced Serbian nationalist ideology. She declared her ideas "the most radical" (najradikalnije) among all candidates during the 1990 elections. "Whoever throws a cigarette butt on the street has done evil to all mankind" (Ko baci opušak na ulicu, učinio je zlo celom čovečanstvu), Ćuić declared during the elections. Additionally, during her television presentation, she said that "as president, I will not allow top athletes to eat in Studentski Grad" (kao predsednik neću dozvoliti da se vrhunski sportisti hrane u Studentskom gradu). Ćuić declared that she "was not interested in other nations and religions" (ne interesuju me druge nacije i vere) and that she wanted Serbia to take over the land of Albania and Romania, for everyone to write in Cyrillic script and speak Serbian. She supported the establishment of cultural autonomy for Serbs in Germany and the United States. On foreign policy, she favoured isolationism and wrote a letter to George H. W. Bush during the elections, claiming that he was ethnically Albanian.

Despite her being a candidate, she did not vote in the elections since she did not know where her voting station was. Ćuić hoped to win the election. However, she received 3,764 votes and finished 23rd out of 32 candidates. The election was eventually won by Slobodan Milošević of the Socialist Party of Serbia. She was the only woman to contest a presidential election in Serbia until 2004, when Ljiljana Aranđelović of United Serbia and Jelisaveta Karađorđević of a citizens group became candidates. Following the elections, she was featured on a Novi Sad New Year's Eve television show with Šećeroski. Ćuić requested to talk with Vojislav Šešelj during the show, but Šećersoki was invited instead. The presentation concluded with Šećeroski and Ćuić's mother performing a waltz.

=== Post-election career ===
Ćuić worked as a driving instructor until the 2000s, when businesses were privatised. She became a member of Arkan's Party of Serbian Unity following the elections. In a 1996 interview for the magazine Svet, she declined to run in the 1997 Serbian general election.

In 2022, Ćuić participated in Prizvan i pozvan (Invoked), a comedy-documentary about the 1990 elections. Srđa Vučo, the documentary's producer, stated that Ćuić was "the last one who entered the film because we realised that something was missing" (poslednja ušla u film jer smo shvatili da nešto fali), and he argued that she is a figure "who is not mentioned by anyone despite being a historically important person" (koju niko ne spominje a istorijski je bitna ličnost). The documentary also featured presidential candidates Dragan Jovanović of the Green Party and Milan Mladenović, as well as parliamentary candidate Savo Nešković of the Great Rock 'n' Roll Party and Serbian Renewal Movement member Milorad Jakšić Fanđo. The documentary was screened at several festivals, such as the International Documentary Film Festival Amsterdam, Subversive Festival, Palić European Film Festival, the Beldocs Festival, and the 71st March Festival at the Belgrade Youth Centre. The documentary received the "Audience Award for the Best European Documentary Film" at the Beldocs Festival.

In June 2024, Ćuić took part in a cultural-artistic programme in the Cultural Centre "Ćirilica", hosted by the Association of Serbian Writers of Slovenia and the European Academy of Serbian Sciences and Arts.

== Personal life ==
Ćuić, a pensioner, is a resident of Belgrade. Her husband's name was Zoran. She is a friend of journalist Milovan Brkić.

== Filmography ==
- Prizvan i pozvan (2022)

== Bibliography ==
- Drage izbeglice moje
- Iz izloga lutka
- Leteći tanjir
- Luka Vukalović

== See also ==
- Electoral firsts in Serbia
