= League of Yugoslav Communist Youth =

League of Yugoslav Communist Youth may refer to:

- Young Communist League of Yugoslavia (1948-1990)
- Youth wing of the New Communist Party of Yugoslavia (1992-)
