= Serbian Chetnik Movement (1990) =

Political party in Serbia

Serbian Chetnik Movement Српски четнички покрет
- Abbreviation: SČP
- President: Vojislav Šešelj
- Founder: Vojislav Šešelj
- Founded: 18 June 1990
- Dissolved: 23 February 1991 (as a party); 28 April 1994 (as paramilitary unit)
- Merged into: Serbian Radical Party
- Newspaper: Velika Srbija
- Ideology: Ultranationalism; Greater Serbia

Serbian Chetnik Movement (Serbian: Српски четнички покрет, Srpski četnički pokret, abbr. SČP) was an unregistered political party in Serbia and later a paramilitary force in the Yugoslav Wars. The party was founded and led by Vojislav Šešelj, a former lecturer at the University of Sarajevo and member of Serbian Renewal Movement. Due to its open connections with World War II-era Chetniks, the party was not permitted to be registered and was barred from participating in the 1990 Serbian general election. Šešelj instead participated in the presidential election as an independent candidate, placing fifth. The party's ideology centered on ultranationalism and promotion of Greater Serbia.

After the elections, SČP merged with the People's Radical Party to create the Serbian Radical Party, with Šešelj as its president. During the Yugoslav Wars, SRS appropriated SČP as its paramilitary unit. It was active in the Eastern Croatia and Bosnian War, where it had committed crimes against Croat and Muslim civilians. At times, Šešelj both supported and condemned SČP, although the International Criminal Tribunal for the former Yugoslavia concluded that Šešelj exercised authority over them. In April 1994, SRS announced the dissolution of SČP.

== History ==
=== As a political party ===
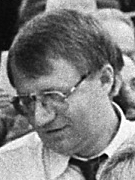
Vojislav Šešelj's SČP was barred from taking part in the 1990 Serbian general election.

Vojislav Šešelj was a member of the League of Communists of Bosnia and Herzegovina (SKBiH) and a lecturer at the University of Sarajevo in the early 1980s. In 1981, he was expelled from SKBiH for allegedly promoting "nationalist and anarcho-liberal ideas". Later, in 1984, he was jailed for authoring a manifesto calling for Yugoslavia's restructuring and the establishment of a Greater Serbian republic. He was condemned to four years in Zenica jail, but only spent 22 months. He gained significant attention in Belgrade, and following his release, he grew close to writer Vuk Drašković. Šešelj founded the Serbian Freedom Movement in January 1990, however, it was short-lived. In March, it merged with Drašković's faction of the Serbian National Renewal to create the Serbian Renewal Movement (SPO). Šešelj and Drašković were, however, unable to cooperate, leading to Šešelj's departure from SPO in May.

Šešelj established the Serbian Chetnik Movement (SČP) as a political party on 18 June 1990. However, the party was denied registration due to its open connections with World War II-era Chetniks. Aleksandar Stefanović of the Liberal Party defected to SČP shortly after its founding. On 25 June, Slobodan Milošević, the president of Serbia, proposed a referendum to proclaim a new constitution. In response, an opposition protest was organised outside the building of Radio Television Belgrade, where Šešelj gave a speech critical of the government. Opposition parties argued that the referendum should be postponed until after the first multiparty elections. The new constitution was accepted by voters, with a turnout of 78%. In September, SČP organised a protest after being denied registration in the political party registry. Opposition parties later organised another protest, this time to present their demands for better election campaign conditions. At the end of the protest, Šešelj and his SČP attempted to hijack the stage.

SČP attempted to take part in the 1990 elections but was barred from it by authorities. During the election campaign, Šešelj was sentenced to prison for violating public order and peace. Following his release, he filed his candidacy in the presidential election. He ran as an independent candidate. Shortly thereafter, on 23 October, he was briefly imprisoned again for attempting to recruit volunteers for the Log Revolution in Croatia. His campaign was marked by criticism of the opposition parties, particularly SPO. He also promised to bring "20 of the biggest Serbian traitors" to trial, including dissident Milovan Djilas. Political scientist Robert Thomas wrote that Šešelj's prison sentences in October 1990 helped him achieve celebrity status in the elections. Ultimately, he finished fifth in the presidential election. In the second round of the parliamentary election, he declined to join the newly established United Opposition of Serbia coalition, instead personally endorsing Democratic Party candidates.

After the elections, the People's Radical Party (NRS) experienced internal conflict as a result of its failure to gain any representation in the National Assembly of Serbia. Tomislav Nikolić, the party's vice-president, proposed merging the party with SČP to form a new political party. Šešelj, however, faced resistance inside SČP, but with the help of Jovan Glamočanin, the merging proceeded. SČP merged with NRS on 23 February 1991 to create the Serbian Radical Party (SRS), with Šešelj as its president.

=== Participation in Yugoslav Wars ===
Emblem of SČP during the Yugoslav Wars

After the creation of SRS, SČP was appropriated as its paramilitary unit throughout the Yugoslav Wars, during which they committed killings of civilians. It has also been defined as a private army of SRS operating in the Republic of Serbian Krajina. Also known as the Šešeljevci (English: Šešelj's men), the paramilitary was active in the Eastern Slavonia of Croatia in March 1991. It took part in the Battle of Borovo Selo, where they killed 12 Croatian policemen. Beginning in March 1992, SČP was stationed in Zvornik, Bosnia and Herzegovina, with the purpose of ethnic cleansing the town. Šešelj there collaborated with the Serb Volunteer Guard (SDG) and White Eagles to raid homes and kill Muslims. In Bijeljina and Doboj, SČP cooperated with SDG in armed conflicts. This campaign marked the beginning of the Bosnian War. Besides their cooperation with other paramilitaries, Šešeljevci were also friendly with the Yugoslav People's Army. In the Eastern Croatia and Bosnian War, the Šešeljevci committed crimes against Croats and Muslims, including murder, torture, robbery, and sexual assault.

The Šešeljevci had 30,000 volunteers. They were noted for wearing black fur hats with Serbian cockades, or military berets with a skull or the Serbian flag. They could have also been identified by their cross-shaped ammunition belts. At different times, Šešelj both supported and condemned the paramilitary unit. The International Criminal Tribunal for the former Yugoslavia (ICTY) concluded that "Šešelj exercised ideological and moral authority over the Šešeljevci sent to the front by his politico-military organisation.

On 28 April 1994, SRS announced the dissolution of SČP and the integration of its local chapters into SRS. In the announcement, Šešelj also disavowed SČP as a paramilitary force.

=== Legacy ===
SRS, the successor of SČP, has promoted similar ideologies to SČP, including Greater Serbian ideology and ultranationalism. The party advocated for the establishment of a Serbian state that would span up to the Karlobag-Karlovac-Virovitica line, which eventually became an equivalent term to Greater Serbia. At the founding assembly, Šešelj declared that "we are prepared, though, for a bloodbath should it be necessary, but only for the sake of the Serbian lands, territories and people". The party was also sympathetic towards Milošević's regime; in return, the party was positively received in pro-government media.

Due to his role in the Yugoslav Wars, Šešelj surrendered to ICTY in 2003. His trial started in 2007, but was suspended in 2009 and continued later in 2010. The trial ended in 2013 and Šešelj was granted a provisional release in 2014 due to his worsening health, after which he returned to Serbia. He then led SRS into the 2016 Serbian parliamentary election, in which the party won 8% of the popular vote.

== Ideology and platform ==
SČP published its political programme in the first edition of Velika Srbija newspaper in July 1990. During its existence as a political party, SČP promoted ultranationalist rhetoric and supported the creation of Greater Serbia. According to University of Connecticut professor Predrag Dojčinović, its programme resembled those of the Nazi Party. Its political actions were often militant.

== Organisation ==
Šešelj was the president of SČP during its entire existence. In the party's statute, the Central Homeland Administration was the highest body of the party while the Homeland Congress was not convened. Its secretary was Vojin Vuletić. The party also had youth and women's wings.

=== List of presidents ===
#	President		Birth–death	Term start	Term end
1	Vojislav Šešelj	Vojislav Šešelj in the National Assembly of Serbia	1954–	18 June 1990	23 February 1991

== Sources ==
- Izbori 1990.: Konačni rezultati izbora za predsednika republike i narodne poslanike [1990 Elections: Final Results of the Elections for the President of the Republic and Deputies] (PDF) (in Serbian). Republic Bureau of Statistics. 30 January 1991. Archived (PDF) from the original on 25 September 2024.
- "Politički program Srpskog četničkog pokreta" [Political Programme of the Serbian Chetnik Movement]. Velika Srbija (in Serbian). No. 1. Serbian Chetnik Movement. July 1990.
- Benson, Leslie (2001). Yugoslavia: A Concise History. Palgrave Macmillan. ISBN 978-1-4039-1383-8.
- Björkdahl, Annika (2018). "Republika Srpska: Imaginary, Performance and Spatialization". Political Geography. 66: 34–43. doi:10.1016/j.polgeo.2018.07.005. ISSN 0962-6298.
- Bugajski, Janusz (1994). Ethnic Politics in Eastern Europe: A Guide to Nationality Policies, Organizations, and Parties. M. E. Sharpe. ISBN 978-1-56324-282-3.
- Cigar, Norman L.; Williams, Paul R. (2002). Indictment at the Hague: The Milosevic Regime and Crimes of the Balkan Wars. New York University Press. ISBN 978-0-8147-1626-7.
- Crotty, William J. (2005). Democratic Development and Political Terrorism: The Global Perspective. Northeastern University Press. ISBN 978-1-55553-625-1.
- Dedeić, Siniša (14 December 2010). "Ruke, barjaci i prvi raskoli" [Arms, Flags and the First Schisms]. Istinomer (in Serbian).
- Dedeić, Siniša (24 December 2010). "Srećna nova 1991!" [Happy New Year 1991!]. Istinomer (in Serbian). Archived from the original on 15 July 2024.
- Filipović, Vladimir (2022). "Srpska pobuna u selima vukovarske općine 1990.–1991" [Serbian Revolt in the Villages of the Municipality of Vukovar 1990–1991]. Scrinia Slavonica (in Croatian). 22 (1): 291–319. doi:10.22586/ss.22.1.9. ISSN 1848-9109.
- Gow, James (2002). The Serbian Project and Its Adversaries: A Strategy of War Crimes. C. Hurst & Co. ISBN 978-1-85065-646-3.
- Hislope, Robert (1996). "Intra-Ethnic Conflict in Croatia and Serbia: Flanking and the Consequences for Democracy". East European Quarterly. 30 (4): 471–494. ISSN 0012-8449.
- Ignjatović, Časlav (3 July 1990). "Izveštaj o rezultatima izjašnjavanja građana u Socijalističkoj Republici Srbiji na republičkom referendumu, održanom 1. i 2. jula 1990. godine, radi potvrđivanja odluke Skupštine Socijalističke Republike Srbije da se donese novi Ustav SR Srbije" [Report on the Results of the Declaration of Citizens in the Socialist Republic of Serbia at the Republican Referendum, Held on 1 and 2 July 1990, In Order to Confirm the Decision of the Assembly of the Socialist Republic of Serbia to Adopt a New Constitution of the SR of Serbia]. Official Gazette of the Socialist Republic of Serbia (in Serbian). 35: 1324. ISSN 0351-5613. Archived from the original on 9 July 2024.
- Judah, Tim (2000). The Serbs: History, Myth, and the Destruction of Yugoslavia. Yale University Press. ISBN 978-0-300-08507-5.
- Kolarić, Jovana (2019). Dosije: Zločini nad Hrvatima u Vojvodini [Dossier: Crimes Against Croats in Vojvodina] (in Serbian). Fond za humanitarno pravo. ISBN 978-86-7932-098-8.
- Landay, Jonathan S. (27 June 1990). "Hundreds Rally Against Communist Control of Media". United Press International.
- Mikuljanac, M. (29 April 1994). "Transformacija četnika" [Transformation of Chetniks]. Borba (in Serbian). p. 5.
- Milivojević, Cvijetin; Radovanović, I. (12 September 1990). "Kišni čovek s kokardom" [Rain Man With a Cockade]. Borba (in Serbian). p. 10.
- Nikolić, Kosta (2011). "Obnavljanje parlamentarnog poretka u Srbiji 1990" [Restoration of the Parliamentary Order in Serbia in 1990]. Tokovi Istorije (in Serbian) (2). ISSN 0354-6497.
- Ramet, Sabrina P. (2006). The Three Yugoslavias: State-Building and Legitimation, 1918–2005. Indiana University Press. ISBN 978-0-253-34656-8.
- Ramet, Sabrina P.; Hassenstab, Christine; Listhaug, Ola (2017). Building Democracy in the Yugoslav Successor States: Accomplishments, Setbacks, and Challenges Since 1990. Cambridge University Press. ISBN 978-1-107-18074-1.
- Ribić, Vladimir (2013). "Akciona osnova političke mobilizacije srpske opozicije u 1990. godini" [Action Basis of the Political Mobilisation of the Serbian Opposition in 1990]. Antropologija (in Serbian). 13 (3). ISSN 1452-7243.
- Ristić, Marija; Domanović, Milka (6 November 2014). "Hague Releases Seselj on Health Grounds". Balkan Insight.
- Samardžija, Anita; Robertson, Shanthi (2012). "Contradictory Populism Online: Nationalist and Globalist Discourses of the Serbian Radical Party's Websites". Communication, Politics and Culture. 45 (1): 96–117. ISSN 1836-0645.
- Spoerri, Marlene (2015). Engineering Revolution: The Paradox of Democracy Promotion in Serbia. University of Pennsylvania Press. ISBN 978-0-8122-4645-2.
- Niezen, Ronald; Sapignoli, Maria (2017). Palaces of Hope: The Anthropology of Global Organizations. Cambridge University Press. ISBN 978-1-107-12749-4.
- Thomas, Robert (1998). Serbia Under Milošević: Politics in the 1990s (1st ed.). London: C. Hurst & Co. ISBN 978-1-85065-367-7.
- Toal, Gerard; Dahlman, Carl T. (2011). Bosnia Remade: Ethnic Cleansing and Its Reversal. Oxford University Press. ISBN 978-0-19-974241-7.
- Zarkov, Dubravka; Glasius, Marlies (2014). Dojčinović, Predrag (ed.). Narratives of Justice In and Out of the Courtroom: Former Yugoslavia and Beyond. Springer Science+Business Media. ISBN 978-3-319-04057-8.
