= United Opposition of Serbia (1990) =

Political coalition in Serbia

United Opposition of Serbia Уједињена опозиција Србије
- Abbreviation: UOS
- Founded: 5 June 1990
- Dissolved: 22 May 1991
- Succeeded by: United Serbian Democratic Opposition
- Slogan: Pobedili smo!; ("We won!")

The United Opposition of Serbia (Note: Also translated as Associated Opposition of Serbia.) (Serbian: Уједињена опозиција Србије, romanised: Ujedinjena opozicija Srbije, abbr. UOS) was a coalition of opposition political parties in Serbia formed in June 1990. The coalition was ideologically heterogeneous, and its membership fluctuated throughout its existence. The main members were the Democratic Party (DS) and the Serbian Renewal Movement (SPO). UOS organised protests in June and September 1990, calling for multi-party elections in the first protest, and a ninety-day election campaign, more television airtime for the opposition, and representation in bodies that would oversee the 1990 Serbian parliamentary elections in the second protest.

While each of the political parties campaigned independently in the first round of the parliamentary elections, they urged their supporters to vote for opposition candidates "regardless of their political affiliation" in the second round run-offs. Members of UOS parties won 28 out of the total 250 seats, with SPO getting 19 and DS getting 7. Following the 1990 elections, UOS organised the March 1991 protests in Belgrade as well as anti-war protests after the Yugoslav Wars broke out. The coalition was dissolved on 22 May 1991, in favour of the more nationalist-orientated United Serbian Democratic Opposition.

== History ==
=== Background and pre-election activities ===
With the dissolution of the League of Communists of Yugoslavia (SKJ) after the 14th Congress, constituent republics of Yugoslavia such as Slovenia and Croatia held their first multi-party elections, paving the way for a transition to liberal democracy. In Serbia, Slobodan Milošević, the president of the presidency of the Socialist Republic of Serbia, was initially opposed to the introduction of a multi-party system and free elections. Despite this, opposition parties began to form in late 1989 and early 1990; this included the Democratic Party (DS) and the Serbian Renewal Movement (SPO).

DS and SPO supported the adoption of a multi-party system, and on 30 May 1990 they demanded a roundtable meeting between the opposition and the government to discuss the adoption of a multi-party system and new election laws. On the same day, DS, SPO, Liberal Party (LS), People's Radical Party (NRS), and Social Democratic Party of Yugoslavia (SDPJ) jointly declared that they would organise a protest on 13 June. These parties, further joined by Democratic Forum (DF) and Serbian Saint Sava Party (SSS), formed a coordination body for the planned protest, effectively creating the United Opposition of Serbia (UOS).

The government responded to the demand for talks, and a roundtable was held on 8 June. At the roundtable, the opposition and the government could not agree on whether to first adopt a new constitution or organise multi-party elections; the government wanted to adopt a new constitution first. The Constitutional Commission of the Assembly of SR Serbia said a day later that multi-party elections could not be held in accordance with the then-constitution of Serbia, and announced that a draft of a new constitution that would address the issue would be published in July and proclaimed in December 1990, following which multi-party elections would be held.

The 13 June protest began at the Republic Square in Belgrade, and was attended by between 8,000 and 70,000 people. This was the first anti-government protest in Serbia since World War II. At the protest, UOS ordered that the government organise free multi-party elections and adopt a new media law. The Radio Television of Belgrade (RTB) covered the protest negatively, and the government labelled the protest as "anti-Serbian". The demonstrators criticised RTB's negative reporting on the opposition, and demanded the resignation of director Dušan Mitević. Once the demonstrators arrived in front of the RTB building, police intervened, and demonstrators, including DS president Dragoljub Mićunović and member Borislav Pekić, were physically beaten.

Milošević refused to work with the opposition after the protest and unexpectedly announced on 25 June that a constitutional referendum would be held on 1 and 2 July. The opposition wanted the referendum to be postponed until after the first multi-party elections, urging a boycott if their demands were not met. Despite these calls, the referendum saw a turnout of 78% and a 97% approval for the new constitution. Shortly after the referendum, Serbia introduced a multi-party system, and the Serbian branch of SKJ was transformed into the Socialist Party of Serbia (SPS), with Milošević as its president. The new constitution was proclaimed on 28 September and parliamentary elections were then called for 9 December.

=== Election activities ===
On 12 September, UOS parties staged another protest, calling for a ninety-day campaign period, more television airtime, and representation on the bodies that would oversee the upcoming election. Members of UOS threatened to boycott the elections if these changes were not made. Milošević rejected the demands. Following the introduction of the new constitution, UOS parties gathered on 1 October, this time together with the People's Party (NS), to restate their call for changes. However, following the meeting, UOS parties began to disagree on the question of a boycott; SPO supported it, while DS and NRS opposed it. Mićunović said that, in case of a boycott, opposition parties would "leave a clear space for the existing government, and we would deprive our own sympathisers of the opportunity to choose" (ostavljamo čist prostor postojećoj vlasti, a sopstvene simpatizere lišavamo mogućnosti da biraju).

UOS came together on the issue of an election boycott in mid-November, when most opposition parties declared one at a joint press conference after the government refused to meet their demands. By 25 November, the number of parties declaring an election boycott had increased to approximately 40. The government believed that a boycott would undermine international acceptance of the election results. On 26 November, the government accepted the UOS's demands and the boycott was cancelled. The parliamentary elections for the National Assembly of Serbia were conducted under a first-past-the-post, two-round voting system with single-member constituencies. For a candidate to be elected in the first round, they had to win at least 50% of the popular vote in their constituency. The first round results on 9 December showed that Milošević's SPS won 87 out of the 250 seats outright, while UOS member parties did not win any.

UOS was formalised as an ad hoc alliance for the second round of the parliamentary elections on 12 December. A document under which signatories promised to run a coordinated campaign in the second round was signed by DS, SPO, NRS, NS, Union of Reform Forces of Yugoslavia in Serbia (SRSJS), People's Peasant Party (NSS), Association for the Yugoslav Democratic Initiative (UJDI), and New Democracy – Movement for Serbia. Signatory parties campaigned under the slogan "We won!" (Pobedili smo!). In the second round, the candidate with the most votes in each constituency would win the seat. While the UOS parties campaigned together, each of their candidates was still listed under the name of their respective party. In the end, Milošević's SPS won 194 out of the 250 seats in the National Assembly, while UOS members won just 28 seats: 19 for SPO, 7 for DS, and 1 each for NSS and UJDI.

=== Post-election activities ===
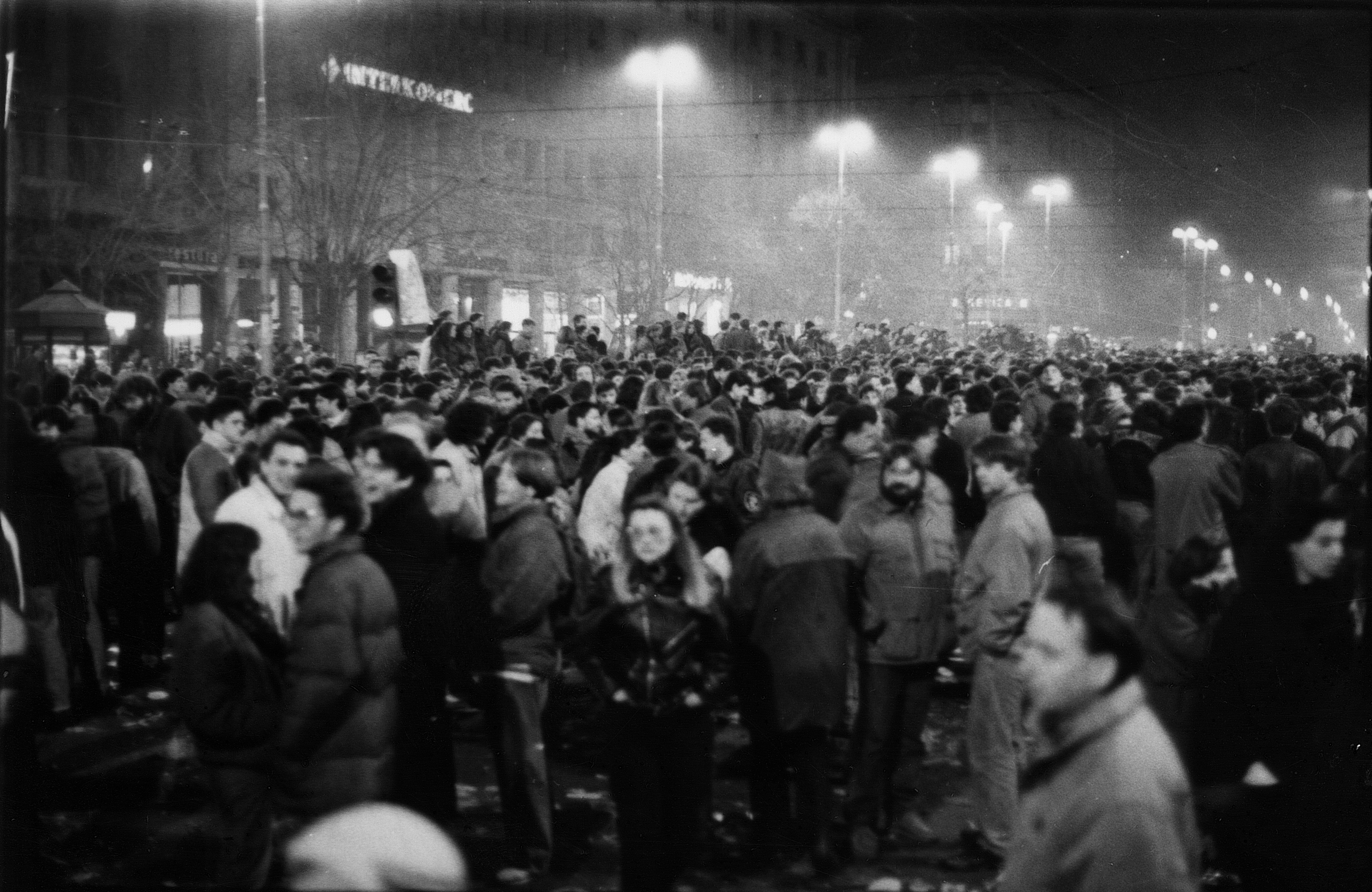
UOS organised the 9–14 March 1991 protests in Belgrade

Following the elections, UOS organised mass protests in March 1991. This was primarily led by SPO. Protesters called for the resignation of senior officials of RTB. The government sought to have the Yugoslav People's Army (JNA) intervene and break up the protest. Borisav Jović, the president of the collective presidency of Yugoslavia, was tasked with persuading other constituent republics to permit such an intervention. Jović claimed that demonstrators were trying to take over the Yugoslav General Staff building, and that the police were unable to manage the protest. Slovenia, Croatia, Macedonia, and Bosnia and Herzegovina were opposed to JNA intervention, while Serbia, Montenegro, Kosovo, and Vojvodina were in favour. Yugoslav Minister of Defence Veljko Kadijević eventually allowed JNA to intervene in the protests, and tanks were brought to the streets of Belgrade for the first time since 20 October 1944. Amidst the protests, Vuk Drašković, the president of SPO, was detained. Drašković was set free on 12 March, part of a series of prisoner releases that helped lead to an end to the protests on 14 March.

By 20 March 1991, DS, SPO, DF, NSS, SRSJS, and UDJI were participating in UOS. UOS organised another protest on 27 March, demanding snap elections and a change of government. In an opinion poll conducted by the Institute for Political Studies after the protests, UOS had 49% of support in Belgrade, while SPS only had 29% of support; the protests contributed to their rise in popularity. This was a shift from the 1990 parliamentary elections, where UOS parties received 31% of the popular vote in Belgrade while SPS received 34%. The increase in UOS support was primarily driven by the 9–14 March protests. In late May, talks among UOS members, in addition to the newly-formed Serbian Liberal Party, began regarding the formation of a "new, stronger alliance" (novog, čvršćeg saveza) that would be more Serbian nationalist-oriented, which would be called the United Serbian Democratic Opposition (USDO). This resulted in the exclusion of the Yugoslav UJDI and leftist NSS from the coalition. UOS was succeeded by USDO on 22 May.

== Organisation ==
=== Ideology and platform ===
UOS was an ideologically heterogeneous grouping, united by the goal of bringing about multi-party politics, and opposition to ruling SPS. Their programme during the 1990 election advocated the implementation of a parliamentary system of governance and a proportional representation electoral system. All UOS parties called for their voters to vote for opposition candidates in the second round "regardless of their political affiliation" (nezavisno od njegove stranačke pripadnosti). Following the beginning of the Yugoslav Wars in 1991, UOS organised anti-war protests. In a March 1991 opinion poll, a majority of students, the educated, the unemployed, and private and public sector workers preferred UOS over SPS.

=== Members ===
The parties participating in the UOS fluctuated throughout its existence. The following table lists political parties that were affiliated with UOS at some point between June 1990 and May 1991.

List of political parties affiliated with UOS
Name
Serbian Renewal Movement (SPO)
Democratic Party (DS)
Liberal Party (LS)
People's Radical Party (NRS)
Social Democratic Party of Yugoslavia (SDPJ)
Democratic Forum (DF)
Serbian Saint Sava Party (SSSS)
People's Party (NS)
Union of Reform Forces of Yugoslavia in Serbia (SRSJS)
People's Peasant Party (NSS)
Association for the Yugoslav Democratic Initiative (UJDI)
New Democracy – Movement for Serbia (ND)

== Electoral performance ==
=== Parliamentary elections ===
National Assembly
Year	Political party	Popular vote	% of popular vote	#	# of seats	Seat change	Status	Ref.
1990	SPO	794,786	16.49%	▲2nd	19 / 250	▲19	Opposition	
1990	DS	374,887	7.78%	▲3rd	7 / 250	▲7	Opposition	
1990	NSS	68,045	1.41%	▲7th	1 / 250	▲1	Opposition	
1990	ND	67,356	1.40%	▲8th	0 / 250	0	Extra-parliamentary	
1990	NRS	63,041	1.31%	▲9th	0 / 250	0	Extra-parliamentary	
1990	SRSJS	27,358	0.57%	▲14th	0 / 250	0	Extra-parliamentary	
1990	UJDI	24,982	0.52%	▲15th	1 / 250	▲1	Opposition	
