= Vojin Dimitrijević =

Serbian law professor, intellectual and human rights activist

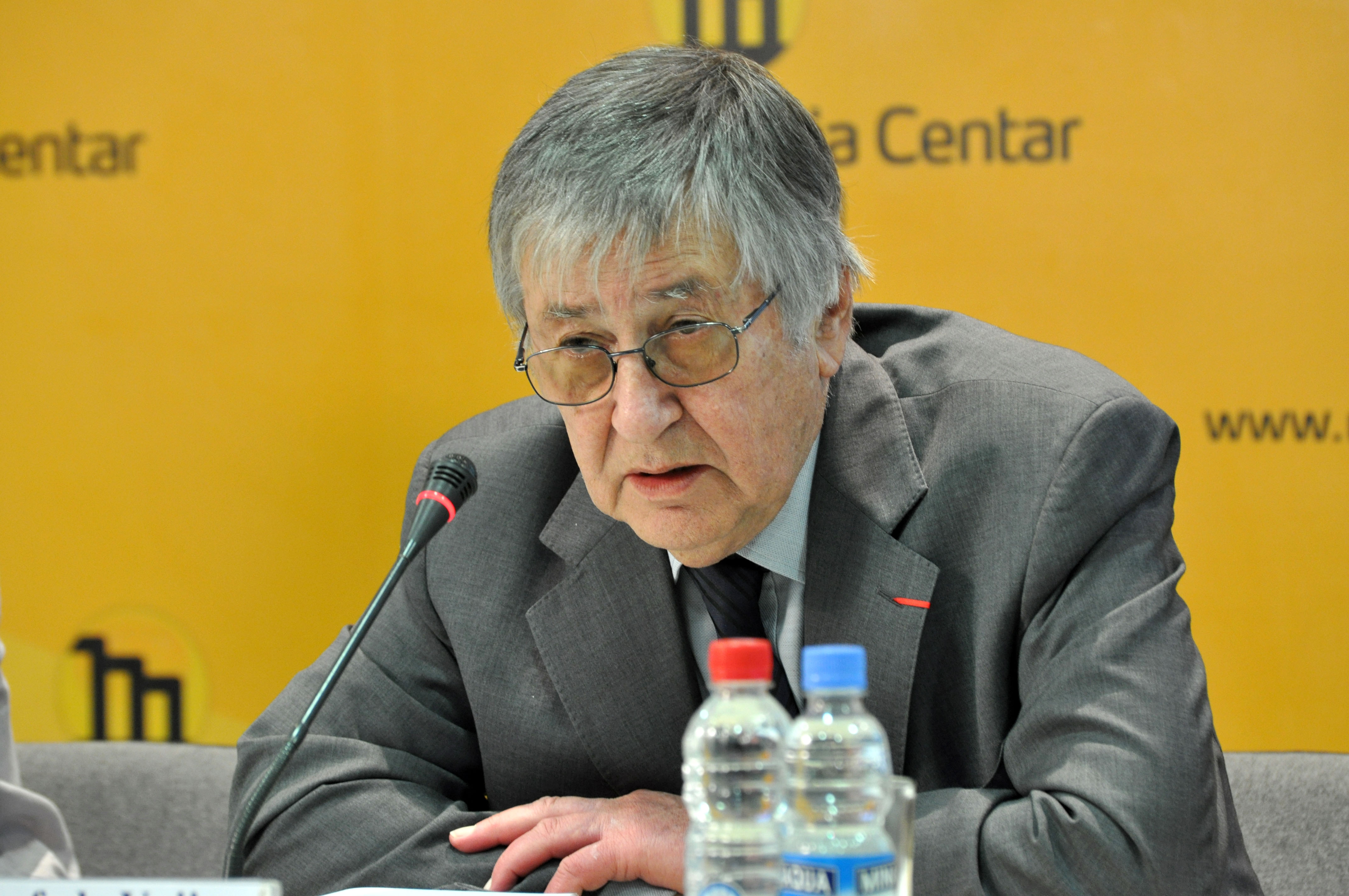
- Dimitrijević in March 2008.
- Born: 9 July 1932; Fiume, Kingdom of Italy
- Died: 5 October 2012 (aged 80); Belgrade, Serbia
- Education: University of Belgrade; Faculty of Law (PhD 1965)
- Occupations: University professor, Director of the Belgrade Centre for Human Rights

Vojin Dimitrijević (Serbian: Војин Димитријевић; 9 July 1932 – 5 October 2012) was a law professor, public intellectual, and a prominent Serbian human rights activist and international law expert.

== Biography ==
Vojin Dimitrijević was born on 9 July 1932 in Rijeka (then in Italy, today in Croatia).

In 1956 he graduated from the University of Belgrade Faculty of Law, where he also obtained his doctorate in 1965 and continued to work as a professor from 1960 until 1998. He was ordered to retire prematurely in 1998, while in the rank of full professor, due to his opposition to the newly passed and repressive Universities Act.

Dimitrijević was the director of the Belgrade Centre for Human Rights, a Serbian non-governmental organisation opposed to the regime of Slobodan Milošević. He held the position from its inception in 1995. Since 2005, he was a professor at the Faculty of Law of the Union University in Belgrade. Dimitrijević was also a visiting professor at the universities of Virginia, Oslo, and Lund.

From 2000 he was a member of the Venice Commission on Democracy through Law of the Council of Europe, while from 2001 he was a member of the Permanent Court of Arbitration in The Hague. He was a commissioner of the International Commission of Jurists and a member of its executive committee. He was also a member and a vice-chairman of the UN Human Rights Committee (1983–1994), and served as an ad hoc judge on the International Court of Justice (2001-2003).

Dimitrijević was the president of the Yugoslav branch of the International Law Association (2001–2003), and a member of the Anticorruption Council of the Government of the Republic of Serbia (2001–2004). He was one of the founders of the Serbian Forum for International Relations (in 1995) and was a member of the Serbian PEN Centre since 1986.

He was a member of the Institut de droit international, received honorary doctorates in law from McGill University and the University of Kent, and was a chevalier of the French Legion of Honour.

== Publications ==
Professor Dimitrijević was the author, co-author or editor of numerous books in Serbian and English:

- Utočište na teritoriji strane države - Teritorijalni azil (Refuge on the Territory of a Foreign State - Territorial Asylum), Belgrade, 1969;
- Međunarodna zajednica i Ujedinjene nacije (The International Community and the United Nations), Belgrade, 1970;
- Uvod u proučavanje međunarodnih odnosa (Introduction into the Study of International Relations), Belgrade, 1970 (with M. Marković and R. Stojanović);
- Međunarodne organizacije (International Organisations) Beograd, 4 editions, 1971, 1978, 1980, 1988 (with O. Racić);
- Pojam bezbednosti u međunarodnim odnosima (The Concept of Security in International Relations), Beograd, 1973;
- Međunarodni odnosi (International Relations), 4 editions, Belgrade: 1977, 1979, 1988, 1996 (with R. Stojanović);
- Terorizam (Terrorism), Belgrade, 2 editions, 1982, 2000;
- Strahovlada (Rule through Fear), Belgrade, 2 editions: 1985, 1997; Human Rights Today, Belgrade, 1988;
- The Insecurity of Human Rights after Communism, Oslo, 1993;
- Neizvesnost ljudskih prava na putu od samovlašća ka demokratiji (The Uncertainty of Human Rights on the Road from Autocracy to Democracy), Novi Sad - Sremski Karlovci, 1994;
- Ljudska prava - udžbenik (Human Rights - A Textbook), Belgrade, 1997 (with M. Paunović and V. Đerić);
- Ljudska prava i pripadnici oružanih snaga (Human Rights and the Military), Belgrade, 2002 (with Jelena Radojković);
- Osnovi međunarodnog javnog prava (Principles of Public International Law), Belgrade, 2005 (editor and co-author);
- Haške nedoumice (The Hague Puzzles). co-author, Belgrade, Belgrade Centre for Human Rights, 2010.

He authored or co-authored more than 250 academic articles.

== Death ==
Vojin Dimitrijević died suddenly in Belgrade on 5 October 2012.
