= Ivan Đurić =

Serbian historian (1947–1997)

- Born: 30 October 1947; Belgrade, Serbia, FPR Yugoslavia
- Died: 23 November 1997 (aged 50); Paris, France
- Education: VIII Belgrade Gymnasium; University of Belgrade
- Occupations: Writer, professor, historian and politician

Ivan Đurić (Serbian Cyrillic: Иван Ђурић; 30 October 1947 – 23 November 1997) was a Serbian writer, professor, historian and politician.

== Biography ==
Đurić was born on 30 October 1947 to parents Dušan S. Đurić (1920–1997) and Ivana (née Bogdanović; born 1925). Both of them were university professors. His father was nicknamed Zinaja after the footballer and cross-country skier.

Đurić ran for President of Serbia in the 1990 Serbian general election as a joint candidate of the Association for Yugoslav Democratic Initiative and the Union of Reform Forces. He finished in third place (behind Slobodan Milošević and Vuk Drašković) with 277,398 votes.

He moved to Paris, France in November 1991 where he died on 23 November 1997.

== Personal life ==
Đurić had a twin sister, Dušanka Trbojević (née Đurić) and a half-brother, Sava Đurić, a Belgrade lawyer and a judge, from his father's second marriage with Verica Đurić.

His paternal great-grandfather was Serbian Orthodox priest Milan Đurić who was one of the founders of the People's Radical Party. His maternal grandfather was author Milan Bogdanović while Bogdan Bogdanović, an architect and former mayor of Belgrade, was his maternal uncle.

Ivan Đurić had three daughters and allegedly one son who was adopted by another man. From his marriage with Maja Danon (daughter of Oskar Danon), he had his oldest daughter, Marija Đurić (1979–2015). From his relationship with Dušica Golubovac, he had a daughter Kristina Đurić, a political scientist and humanitarian. He also had a daughter with Marija Kreća, Sanja Đurić, who graduated with a BA in International Relations from the University of Belgrade and received her MA from the College of Europe.

== Notable published books ==
- Ektesis nea, 1974
- Porodica Foka, 1976
- Oxford Dictionary of Byzantium, 1980 (multiple authors)
- Sumrak Vizantije: Vreme Jovana VIII Paleologa 1392-1448, 1984
- Romejski govor i jezik Konstantina VII Porfirogenita, 1986
- Istorija – pribežište ili putokaz, 1990
- Vlast, opozicija, alternativa, 2009 (posthumously)

=== Chronology of Ivan Đurić's writings ===
1. „Ektesis nea“ – vizantijski priručnik za „pitakia“ o srpskom patrijarhu i nekim feudalcima krajem XIV veka, ZFFB – Filozofski fakultet, Beograd, XII – 1 (1974), Spomenica Georges Ostrogorsky, str. 415–432
2. Porodica Foka, ZRVI – SANU, Beograd, 17 (1976), str. 189 296.
3. The Intitulations of the Metropolitans in „Ekstesis nea“ and the Organization of the Church in Asia Minor in the Late Fourteenth Century, Xve Cngrès International d’ Etudes Byzantines. Résumés des communications, Athènes, 1976
4. Titulature Mitropolita u „Ektesis nea“ i crkvena organizacija u Maloj Aziji krajem XIV veka, ZFFB XIII-1, Filozofski fakultet, Beograd, (1976), str. 53–70
5. Svetovni dostojanstvenici u „Ektesis nea“, ZRVI 18 – SANU, Beograd, (1978), str. 189–211
6. Podatak iz 1444. o svetogorskom manastiru Karakalu, ZFFB XIV – 1 (1979), Filozofski fakultet, Beograd, Spomenica Franjo Barisić, str. 211–218
7. Titles of the Rulers of the Second Blgarian Empire in the Eyes of the Byzantines, Charanis Studies. Essays in Honor of Peter Charanis, ed. By Angeliki E. LAIOU – THOMADAKIS, „Rutgers University Press“, New Brunswick – New Jersey, 1980, pp. 31–50
8. Remarques sur l’épigramme de la croix de Léon, Etudes sur les croix byzantines du Musée d’Art et d’ Historie de Genève, Geneva XXVIII (1980), n.s., pp. 115–118, 123–124 371 Ivan Đurić
9. Pomenik svetogorskog protata s kraja XIV veka, ZRVI 20 (1981), SANU, Beograd, str. 139–169
10. Chronological Limits of „Presbeutikos“ by Theodore Metochites, XIV. Internationaler Byzantinistenkongress. Résumés der Kurzbeigräge, Wien, 1981, 5.1
11. Cadres chronologiques du „Presbeutikos“ de Théodore Métochite, XVI. Internationaler Byzantinistenkongress, Akten, II / 3, JÖB („Jahrbuch der Oesterreichischen Byzantinistik“) 32 / 3 (1982), pp. 111 120
12. Evdokija Komnina i njen muž Konstatin Dragaš, ZRVI 22 (1982), SANU, Beograd, str. 259–272
13. Sumrak Vizantije – Vreme Jovana VIII Paleologa; 1392–1448, „Narodna knjiga“, Beograd, 1984, 486 str. (drugo izdanje – 1985; treće izdanje – „Naprijed“, Zagreb, 1989; itd.)
14. Istorija – pribežište ili putokaz? „Književne novine, Beograd, n.676 (15. novembar 1984), str. 14.
15. La définition de Byzance: un essai d’ interprétation, Razo – Cahiers du Centre d’ Etudes Médiévales de Nice 4 (1984), pp. 153–165
16. Istina i istorija, „Književne novine“, Beograd n.707 (1. april 1986), str. 12
17. Teodor Metohit i „Poslaničko slovo“ Teodora Metohita, Vizantijski izvori za istoriju naroda Jugoslavije, t. VI;K ZRVI-SANU, Beograd (koautori: S. Ćirković, B. Ferjančić, Lj. Maksimović, N. Radošević i I. Đurić), (1986), str. 63–143
18. Romejski govor i jezik Konstantina VII Porfirogenita, ZRVI 24–25, SANU, Beograd, (1986), str. 109–137
19. L’habitat constantinopolitain sous les Palèologue: les palais et les baraques. He Kathêmerinê zoê sto Byzantio, Praktika tou A’ Diethnous Symposiou („La vie quotidienne à Byzance, Actes du I-er colloque international“), éd. „Kentro Byzantinôn Ereunôn / C.I.E.“, Athènes, (1989), pp. 733–752
20. Historikê aletheia, balkanikoi patriotismoi kai ethogeneseis stên paideia („La vérité historique, les patriotismes balkaniques et les ethnogénèses dans l’ éducation“), Actes du Colloque International: 372 vlast, opozicija, alternativa Université-Idéologie – Culture (Athènes, 1987), 1989, pp. 377–385; 605 649
21. Vizantija i Srbi u borbi protiv Turaka. 1389–1459, Srpski narod u drugoj polovini XIV i u prvoj polovini XV veka, ed. „Zavod za udžbenike i nastavna sredstva“, Beograd, (1989), str. 81–94
22. Žorž Dibi: trijumf pojedinca u savremenoj francuskoj istorijskoj misli, ed. „Nolit“, Beograd, (1989), str. 7–21
23. Teofilakt Ohridski pod šatorom Arona, ZRVI 27–28, SANU, Beograd, (1989), str. 69–91
24. Istorijski pogled na budućnost krize u Jugoslaviji, Odjek, Sarajevo, godina XLII, n.6–7 (15. mart 1990 – 15. april 1990), Ibidem, godina II, n. 5, str. 9–20
25. Vera i crkva, „Nedjelja“, Sarajevo, n. 7 (8. april 1990), str. 20 21 172 14–15
26. Istorija – pribežište ili putokaz, ed. „Svjetlost“, Sarajevo, 1990,
27. Vilistan, „Demokratija danas“, Beograd, n. 3, jun 1990, str.
28. U koži Vuka Brankovića, „Demokratija danas“, Beograd, n. 4 5, jul–avgust 1990, str. 7–8
29. Domoljupci i rodoljupci, „Demokratija danas“, Beograd, n. 6, oktobar 1990, str. 12–13
30. Les racines historiques du conflit serbo-croate, Etudes, t. 375, n. 4 (3754), octobre 1991, pp. 293–303
31. Deževski sabor u delu Danila II, Arhiepiskop Danilo II i njegovo doba, ed. SANU, Beograd (decembar 1987), 1991, str. 169–195
32. Srbi i Hrvati šta sada valja činiti?, „Stav“, Novi Sad, n. 92 (23. januar 1992), str. 34–38
33. „Srbi, Hrvati i ’Realpolitik’“, „Nedeljna borba“, Beograd, n. 88–89 (28–29. mart 1992), str. VI–VII
34. El historiador y la geostrategia en el espacio yugoslavo, El Pais, Temas de nuestra epoca, n. 242 (9 juille 1992), pp. 76–78 373 Ivan Đurić
35. Le Vilistan, dans Lettre Internationale, n. 33 (été 1992), pp 76 78
36. L’ Europe face à la Yougoslavie: être ou ne pas être, Libération, 26 août 1992, p. 8
37. Réalité historique et géostratégique de l’ espace yougoslave, Les Temps Modernes, n. 555 (octobre 1992) pp. 142–149
38. La Bosnie – Herzégovine en dix questions, hors – série Sarajevo (coll. Libération), novembre 1992, pp. 16–20
39. Pax Americana, El Pais, Opinion, 3 mars 1993, p. 17
40. Preparémonos, El Pais, Opinion, 3 juin 1993, p. 4
41. Préparons – nous, Le Monde, Débats, 3 juin 1993, p. 2
42. Pax Americana, Sur l’ ex-Yougoslavie, éd. „Collège International de Philosophie“, Paris, 1993, pp. 17–19
43. Bosnienserberna Belgrad gisslan, Svenska Dagbladet, 11 juin 1993, pp. 17–18
44. Plus que jamais, soutenir les démocrates serbes, Globe, 14–20 juillet 1993, El Pais, pp. 37–39
45. Serbia, agosto de 1993, El Pais, Opinion, 25 août 1993, pp. 7 8
46. Demokratin svälts ut i Belgrad, Svenska Dagbladet, 7 septembre 1993, pp. 23–24
47. Social Tensions Handicap The Opposition, Warreport (Londres), août – septembre 1993, p. 24
48. Etat des lieux en Serbie, Le Soir (Bruxelles), 8 octobre 1993, p. 2
49. Nazionalità, culture, etnie nella ex–Yugoslavia: una prospettiva storica, I Nuovi Razzismi n. 1, terza serie, 1993, pp. 23–25
50. Serbes et Croates. Que faut – il faire maintenant?, Lignes, n. 20 (septembre 1993), pp. 14–29
51. Droits des minorités et frontières européennes: prévisions et solutions (intervention), Nouvelle Europe: minorités et réfugiés (Actes du 374 vlast, opozicija, alternativa colloque organisé par le Groupement pour les droits des minorités, 25–26 mars 1992), éd. „GDM“, Paris, 1993, pp. 23–27, 32–34
52. Rittorno in Serbia, Ragionamenti sui fatti e le imagini della storia, n. 34 (dicembre 1993), pp. 34–41
53. Ett val med sväröverskädliga följder, Svenska Dagbladet, 17 decembre 1993, pp. 25–26
54. El invierno europeo, El Pais, 31 décembre 1993, p. 6
55. Les Russes dans les Blkans, Le Nouveau Quotidien (Lausanne), 1-er mars 1994, p. 4; Svenska Dagbladet, 3 mars 1994, pp. 17 18; Libération, 8 mars 1994, p. 6; Puls (Skopje, Macédoine), 4 mars 1994, p. 44; L’ Unità, 10 mars 1994, p. 2
56. L’ au delà de la guerre dans l’ ex-Yougoslavie: la réconciliation aprés le conflit, Politique étrangère (hiver 93/94), pp. 919 931
57. Vilistan, Dizionario di un paese che scomparse. Narrativa della ex-Yugoslavia, a cura di Nicole JANIGRO, éd. „Maniesto Libri“, Rome, 1994, pp. 71–77
58. Milosevic ou Milosevic, Libération, 13 octobre 1994, p. 7
59. Les rapports de force entre l’ Eglise et l’ Etat dans les Balkans, La Xénophobie (Actes du colloque) éd. „Passages – UNESCO“, Paris, 1994, pp. 242–244
60. Sarajevo. Le miroir brisé, ouvrage collectif (P. MATVEHEVITCH, V. STEVANOVIC, N. KOVAC, I DJURIC, F. COMBES, CH. PETR), Éd. „Les Temps des Cerises“, Paris, 1995, 144 pp
61. Kriza knjige i moguća rešenja, „Erasmus“ (Zagreb, Hrvatska), n. 11 (1995), str. 59–60
62. Les Yugoslaves en 1945: russophiles ou soviétophiles? Revue d’ Europe Centrale, t. II, n. 2 (1994), pp. 229–246
63. L’heure de véritè, L’ Evénement du jeudi, No. 555 (22–28 juin 1995), p. 77
64. Demasiado tarde para la verqüenza, El Pais (20 juillet 1995), p. 12 375 Ivan Đurić
65. Russophilie, russophobie, soviétophobie chez Les Slaves du Sud, Etudes, t. 383, n. 3 (3833), septembre 1995, pp. 169–177
66. II Crepuscolo di Bisanzio. I tempi di Giovanni VIII Paleologo (1392–1448), Introduzione di Mario GALLINA, éd. „Donzelli Editore“, Rome, 1995, XVII 346 pp
67. Un americano en Paris, El Pais (5 décembre 1995), pp. 13–14
68. Retten, was zu retten ist, Tages Anzeiger (Zurich), 8 décembre 1995, p. 2
69. Le crépuscule de Byzance, éd. „Maisonneuve et Larose“, Paris, 1996, 430 pp
70. Belgrade ist nicht zuhause, Die weisse Stadt (Konferenzeiträge), Vienne, 1996, pp. 1–7
71. Beograd – stariji od Srba, „Naša Borba“ (Beograd), 8–9 jun 1996, str. XIV–XV
72. La Fortune de Théodore Métochite, Cahiers Archéologiques 44 (1996), pp. 149–168
73. Bosnia-Herzegovia – French Revolution Ideal, 99- Sarajevo, 2–3 (avril 1996), pp. 24–25
74. Les Balkans. Pazsage aprés la bataille (sous la direction de Jacques RUPNIK), Le poids de la Serbie (pp. 83–105), éd. „Editons Complexe“, Bruxelles, 1996, 169 pp
75. L’usure du nationalisme serbe, „Convergences“, 12 janvier 1997, Paris
76. Milosevic peut provoquer la guerre (propos), „L’évenemente du jeudi“, 23–29 janvier 1997, p. 43, Paris
77. Mislio sam da će me bar neko razumeti, „Odgovor“, Beograd, 6. februar 1997
78. S jedne strane demokratija i patriotizam, s druge – autoritarizam i nacionalizam, „Nedeljna Naša Borba“, Beograd, februar 1997 376 vlast, opozicija, alternativa
79. Kosovo, Albanci, Srbi: ipak se mora razgovarati. Srpsko albanski dijalog, jun 1997, Beograd, str. 120–126, Helsinški odbor za ljudska prava u Srbiji
80. Bosnu je nemoguće podeliti, „Oslobođenje“, Sarajevo, 30. jun 1997
81. Srbija voli da o Kosovu ćuti, „Nedeljna Naša Borba“, Beograd, 5–6. jul 1997
82. Srbija nije u demokratskom svetu, „Demokratija“, Beograd, 23–24. avgust 1997
83. Regionalizacija – budućnost Srbije, „Demokratija“, Beograd, 14. oktobar 1997 377
84. Vlast, opozicija, alternativa, 2009 (posthumously; foreword written by Latinka Perović)
