= Nikola Šećeroski =

Serbian politician (1934–2008)

Nikola Šećeroski (Serbian Cyrillic: Никола Шећероски; 1934–2008) was a Serbian independent presidential candidate in the 1990 election. He is remembered for his 1990 election TV Beograd interview.

== Early life ==
He was born in 1934 to a Macedonian Serb family in Radožda, a village on the shore of Lake Ohrid in the south-west of Yugoslavia, in modern-day North Macedonia.

== Early activism ==
He was a social activist in the 1970s, and protested against some corrupted officials, and became a politician in the 1980s.

== 1990 election ==
A 1-hour long TV interview for TV Beograd ahead of the 1990 elections, representing himself, made him famous in Yugoslavia, as he eccentrically spoke about various matters, most famously of the accusations against him by the municipality of Čukarica that he made "brooms and brushes", that had haunted him for three years, stating that he had "nothing to do with brooms and brushes, I am a plastic worker", and that they needed to be punished. He made several more TV appearances, such as guesting popular Minimaks.

After losing his last job, he turned to make plastic animals, which he received permission of to sell by the municipality, however, according to him, as soon as he neared the main station, he was arrested, written an offence ticket, imprisoned with a straitjacket, then released, accused of selling brooms and brushes. He stated that this was due to his past outspoken criticism.

He finished 26th with 3,168 votes.

== Sources ==
- "Reporteri Glasa u novogodišnjoj poseti Nikoli Šećeroskom, nesuđenom predsedniku Srbije i Jugoslavije". Glas javnosti. 2006.
- "Ko je ovaj čovek? Nikola Šećeroski". Glas javnosti. 2000. Archived from the original on 2009-02-23.
- "Kad postanem predsednik zabraniću kafenisanje!". Nadlanu.
