= Federal Party of Yugoslavs =

Political party in Serbia

The Federal Party of Yugoslavs (Serbian Cyrillic: Савезна странка Југословена, romanized: Savezna stranka Jugoslovena, abbr. SSJ), known initially as the Party of Yugoslavs (Serbo-Croatian Cyrillic: Странка Југословена, romanized: Stranka Jugoslovena, abbr. SJ) was a political party in Yugoslavia, and later in Serbia after the dissolution of Yugoslavia.

== History ==
The party was formed on 6 March 1990 in Zagreb under the name Party of Yugoslavs. Its first president was Ante Ercegović. The party advocated Yugoslavism, market reforms and a peaceful resolution to the Yugoslav crisis. Following the dissolution of Yugoslavia, the Serbian branch of the party continued to exist under the name Federal Party of Yugoslavs and was led by fiction writer Berislav Kosier.

In the 1990 election, the party won one seat. Its sole MP was journalist Mihajlo Kovač. The party supported Blažo Perović in the presidential election and won 1.14%. At this time, the party had links to the Workers' Party of Yugoslavia led by Milosav V. R. Jovanović who mailed a letter of support to the party's congress in Sarajevo in 1991.

In 1994 the party was one of the 19 parties that merged to form the Yugoslav Left. It left the Yugoslav Left on 25 August 1997 following its decision to dissolve all participating parties in favor of a unified program. Kosier later condemned the JUL's decision to support a coalition with the far-right Serbian Radical Party.

Berislav Kosier died in 2002. The party officially ceased to exist in Serbia on 19 April 2010.

== Prominent members ==
- Ante Ercegović
- Ante Popović
- Berislav Kosier
- Božidar Milosavljević
- Blaško Gabrić
- Emil Vlajki
- Stanislav Žitnik
