= Association for the Yugoslav Democratic Initiative =

Political party in Yugoslavia

Association for the Yugoslav Democratic Initiative Udruženje za jugoslovensku demokratsku inicijativu Удружење за Југословенску демократску иницијативу
- Founded: 2 February 1989
- Dissolved: 1992
- Ideology: Yugoslav federalism; Liberalism; Anti-nationalism
- Political position: Big tent

The Association for the Yugoslav Democratic Initiative (Serbo-Croatian: Udruženje za jugoslovensku/jugoslavensku demokratsku inicijativu, UJDI) was a political party in SFR Yugoslavia. It is widely considered the first independent all-Yugoslav political movement.

UJDI's basic tenets were the transformation of the state through democratization, freedom of thought and political activity, including free multi-party elections, as well as the support for Yugoslavia as a united federal state, as opposed to centralism and separatism.

== History ==
In January 1989, UJDI's co-founder Predrag Matvejević described its goal as "making the Socialist Alliance [of Working People of Yugoslavia] into a kind of an alternative party, a socialist one, in which alternative solutions and alternative cadres could arise, as well as the rectification of everything about the League of Communists [of Yugoslavia] that was not working and was not good".

UJDI was founded on February 2, 1989, in Zagreb, by a group of left-leaning intellectuals, notably its first president was Branko Horvat, the second president was Nebojša Popov, its director was Žarko Puhovski and the members included Predrag Matvejević, Abdulah Sidran, Bogdan Bogdanović, Milan Kangrga, Lev Kreft, Shkëlzen Maliqi, Vesna Pešić, Koča Popović, Milorad Pupovac, Karlo Štajner, Ljubiša Ristić, Božidar Gajo Sekulić, Rudi Supek, Ljubomir Tadić, Dubravka Ugrešić, Tibor Várady, Predrag Vranicki, Nenad Zakošek and Jug Grizelj.

A Slovenian affiliate of the party was also founded under the leadership of the sociologist Rastko Močnik, but it ceased functioning even before the 1990 multi-party elections.

In the 1990 Serbian parliamentary election, it obtained 0.5% and won 1 seat by Tibor Várady.

In the 1990 Serbian presidential election, Ivan Đurić ran as the common candidate of UJDI and the Union of Reform Forces and won 5.5% of the vote, finishing in the third place.

In 1992, after the breakup of Yugoslavia, its Serbian branch merged into the Civil Alliance of Serbia.

== Bibliography ==
- Orlić, Mila (2011). "Od postkomunizma do postjugoslavenstva. Udruženje za jugoslavensku demokratsku inicijativu" [From post-communism to post-Yugoslavism. Association for the Yugoslav Democratic Initiative] (PDF). Politička misao (in Croatian). 48 (4). Faculty of Political Science, University of Zagreb: 98–112.
- Sasso, Alfredo (2014). "The 'Bosnian Silence'? Regime Decline and Civic Alternatives in Bosnia-Herzegovina (1989-1990)" (PDF). Časopis za povijest Zapadne Hrvatske. 9: 27–50.
