= New Communist Party of Yugoslavia =

Political party in Serbia

New Communist Party of Yugoslavia Нова комунистичка партија Југославије Nova komunistička partija Jugoslavije
- Abbreviation: NKPJ
- General Secretary: Aleksandar Banjanac
- Founder: Branko Kitanović
- Founded: 30 June 1990; 36 years ago
- Headquarters: Nikole Spasića 4, Belgrade
- Newspaper: Novi komunist
- Youth wing: League of Communist Youth of Yugoslavia (SKOJ) (Note: NKPJ claims its youth wing established in 1992 to be a continuation of the original League of Communist Youth of Yugoslavia (SKOJ) which existed under that name until 1948, the same year Tito–Stalin split happened.)
- Ideology: Communism; Marxism–Leninism; Stalinism; Yugoslavism; Russophilia
- Political position: Far-left
- National affiliation: NKPJ–SKOJ
- European affiliation: INITIATIVE
- International affiliation: IMCWP; World Anti-Imperialist Platform; Sovintern
- Colours: Red
- Anthem: The Internationale
- National Assembly: 0 / 250
- Assembly of Vojvodina: 0 / 120

Party flag

Website
- www.nkpj.org.rs

The New Communist Party of Yugoslavia (Serbian: Нова комунистичка партија Југославије, НКПЈ / Nova komunistička partija Jugoslavije, NKPJ) is an unregistered Marxist–Leninist party in Serbia. Its goal is the reunification of Yugoslavia as a communist state according to Marxism–Leninism. The party participated in the 2023 Serbian parliamentary election in coalition with the Russian Party, which entered a parliamentary group with Movement of Socialists and supported the government of Aleksandar Vučić.

== History ==
The founding congress of the New Communist Party of Yugoslavia (NKPJ) was held on 30 June 1990 in Belgrade. The Congress (Founding Assembly) was held in the hall of the Association of Engineers and Technicians of Serbia, with the participation of 265 delegates from all republics of the Socialist Federal Republic of Yugoslavia. The delegates present decided that the party should be named the New Communist Movement of Yugoslavia (NKPJ). That name was valid until 1995, when it was changed to today's New Communist Party of Yugoslavia (NKPJ).

Following the 2006 Montenegrin independence referendum, and the dissolution of Serbia and Montenegro, the Montenegrin branch of the party continued as the New Communist Party of Montenegro (NKPCG).

The party boycotted the 2007 parliamentary election, because of its position that the electoral law violated fundamental democratic principles and the Universal Declaration of Human Rights. In 2010 the party was removed from the list of registered parties after failing to re-register under the new electoral law.

Due to the removal from the list of registered parties NKPJ decided to boycott the 2014 parliamentary election as well as all local elections and not join any coalitions. They interrupted several meetings of other political parties urging for boycott of the elections and claiming they were illegal.

=== Modern period (2017–present) ===
In March 2020, NKPJ announced their participation in the 2020 parliamentary election. They submitted their list on 5 June, and they failed to give signatures after its deadline was extended for two days. In late December 2021, they announced their participation in the upcoming 2022 general election.

Belgrade was the host of the 2022 Meeting of European Communist Youth Organisations (MECYO) which the NKPJ's SKOJ is member of. Delegates of 22 youth communist organisations agreed on a declaration that denounced anti-communist repression in the European Union, reissued solidarity with Ukrainian communist activists Mikhail and Aleksander Kononovich who were arrested and detained as political prisoners by the SBU on charges of "pro-Russian views and pro-Belarusian views", denounced "capitalist exploitation and imperialist wars" as well as the "NATO occupation of Kosovo and Metohija"; having taken part in a protester march along central Belgrade chanting anti-NATO slogans the day earlier.

== Ideology ==
NKPJ is a communist party that endeavours for the reunification of Yugoslavia according to a Stalinist model.

== Organization ==
NKPJ has its branch in Montenegro and also it has sister parties in neighbouring Croatia and North Macedonia. Its current general secretary is Aleksandar Banjanac, he has served the role since January 2017.

== Electoral performance ==
=== Parliamentary elections ===
National Assembly of Serbia
| Year | Popular vote | % of popular vote | # | # of seats | Seat change | Coalition | Status | Ref. |
|---|---|---|---|---|---|---|---|---|
| 1990 | 4,017 | 0.08% | ▲29th | 0 / 250 | 0 | – | Extra-parliamentary | |
| 1997 | 16,222 | 0.41% | ▲11th | 0 / 250 | 0 | – | Extra-parliamentary | |
| 2023 | 11,369 | 0.31% | ▼14th | 0 / 250 | 0 | NKPJ–RS | Extra-parliamentary | |
| 2026 | | | ▲12th | 0 / 250 | 0 | NKPJ–RS | Extra-parliamentary | |

=== Federal elections ===
| Year | Popular vote (in Serbia) | % of popular vote | # of seats | Seat change | Coalitions | Status |
|---|---|---|---|---|---|---|
| 1992–93 | 5,678 | 0.38% | 0 / 138 | New | — | |
| 1996 | 21,602 | 1.45% | 0 / 138 | 0 | — | |
| 2000 | 35,742 | 0,73 | 0 / 138 | 0 | — | |

=== Parliamentary elections ===
Parliament of Montenegro
| Year | Popular vote | % of popular vote | Overall seats won | Seat change | Alliance |
|---|---|---|---|---|---|
| 1992 | 1,092 | 0.37 | 0 / 75 | New | — |
| 1996 | 5,176 | 1.72% | 0 / 75 | 0 | Communists of Montenegro (With SKPJ–SKCG–DKP) |

== See also ==
- Communist Party (Serbia)
- League of Communists of Yugoslavia in Serbia
- Party of Labour (Serbia)
