= People's Radical Party (1990) =

Former political party in Serbia

People's Radical Party Народна радикална странка
- Founders: Veljko Guberina; Tomislav Nikolić
- Founded: 1990
- Dissolved: 2010
- Preceded by: People's Radical Party (Yugoslavia) (self-proclaimed, not legal successor)
- Succeeded by: Serbian Radical Party (1991); People's Radical Assembly
- Headquarters: Belgrade
- Ideology: Populism; Serbian nationalism; Monarchism
- Political position: Right-wing

Website
- www.narodna-radikalna.org (archived)

People's Radical Party (Serbian: Народна радикална странка, romanized: Narodna radikalna stranka; abbr. НРС, NRS) was a minor national-conservative and monarchist political party in Serbia that existed from 1990 to 2010. The party considered itself the successor to the People's Radical Party that was active in the Kingdom of Serbia and Kingdom of Yugoslavia.

== History ==
The People's Radical Party considers itself a successor to the People's Radical Party, a powerful political party that was active in the Kingdom of Serbia and Kingdom of Yugoslavia, which was later banned in 1945 upon the establishment of the communist regime in Yugoslavia.

The People's Radical Party was re-established in Serbia after the introduction of the multi-party system in 1990. Lawyer Veljko Guberina was elected president of the party in 1990 and the party participated at the 1990 parliamentary elections, however it only won 63,041 votes, or 1.25% of the popular vote. After the elections there was a party split. At the meeting of the Main Board in Belgrade, there was a conflict between Guberina and Tomislav Nikolić, who led the Kragujevac Radicals. Although Guberina left the meeting with his supporters, Nikolić and his supporters left the party and founded the Serbian Radical Party in Kragujevac on 23 February 1991 and elected Vojislav Šešelj as the president of the newly formed party.

After the departure of a large part of the members led by Tomislav Nikolić, the party significantly weakened its rating and did not pass the census in the elections. Due to the election defeat, Veljko Guberina resigned from the position of president and withdrew from politics, the party then elected him honorary president. Until recently, the party was led by Milan Jovanović and it only had deputies in Negotin. The party officially dissolved in 2010.

== Electoral performance ==
Year	Popular vote	% of popular vote	# of seats	Seat change	Government
1990	63,041	1.25%	0 / 250	Steady	non-parliamentary
