= Democratic Movement of Serbia =

Democratic Movement of Serbia Демократски покрет Србије Demokratski pokret Srbije
- Abbreviation: DEPOS
- Leader: Vuk Drašković
- Spokesperson: Vladeta Janković
- Founded: 23 May 1992
- Dissolved: 23 February 1994
- Merged into: Coalition Together
- Headquarters: Masarikova 5, Belgrade
- Political position: 1992: Center-right; 1993: Big tent
- National Assembly (1993 election): 45 / 250

The Democratic Movement of Serbia (Serbian: Демократски покрет Србије, Demokratski pokret Srbije) or DEPOS was a Serbian political coalition that existed between 1992 and 1994.

Initially, the DEPOS was a right-wing coalition led by the conservative monarchist Serbian Renewal Movement (SPO) of Vuk Drašković. Aside from the SPO, the coalition included New Democracy, the Serbian Liberal Party (SLS) and would lead to a split within the centrist Democratic Party (DS) with the right-wing faction led by Vojislav Koštunica splitting to join the DEPOS under the name Democratic Party of Serbia (DSS). The leadership of the DS refused to join the coalition due to its anti-secular and monarchist positions, as well as its use of Chetnik imagery. The DEPOS was also joined by a group of independent intellectuals led by Matija Bećković. At its Vidovdan Assembly in June 1992, the coalition was supported by Patriarch Pavle, Crown Prince Alexander, as well as the leader of the concurrent 1992 student protest, Dragan Đilas.

In the 1992 election, the DEPOS supported the independent candidate, Serbian-American businessman Milan Panić, against sitting President Slobodan Milošević, backed by his Socialist Party of Serbia (SPS). The election ended in crushing defeat for the opposition with Panić finishing second and the DEPOS being forced into third place in the parliamentary election by the up until then marginal Serbian Radical Party (SRS). After the new ruling SPS-SRS majority introduced changes to the functioning of the upper house of the Federal Assembly, the DEPOS split over tactics with the DSS and SLS supporting a continued parliamentary boycott, while the SPO and ND returned to parliament in April 1993. During this time, Drašković would align with the ruling SPS, the DS and the Civic Alliance of Serbia (GSS) in support of the Vance-Owen peace plan for ending the Bosnian War. The plan was opposed by Koštunica, the DSS and SLS.

Shortly reunited in the summer of 1993 during Vuk Drašković's arrest, detention and hunger strike, the SPO and DSS would ultimately run in the 1993 election separately, while the SLS decided to boycott the election. The DEPOS was refounded in November 1993 as a coalition of the SPO, New Democracy and the anti-war GSS. This marked the culmination of Drašković's evolution from his more hard-line nationalist background into centre-right, civic-national and anti-war positions. The renewed DEPOS achieved a slightly worse result compared to the 1992 election, although it consolidated its voter base and became the second largest parliamentary grouping.

The coalition fell apart in February 1994 when New Democracy formed a coalition government with Milošević's SPS, however its remaining constituents would continue to cooperate and would go on to form the Together coalition with the DS in 1996.

== Background ==
In early 1992, the Serbian opposition seized the opportunity offered by the de-escalation of the War in Croatia following the Sarajevo Agreement and started to unite against the ruling SPS government and Serbian President Slobodan Milošević. On 9 February, the Democratic Party (DS) presented its petition titled the "Proclamation of the Democratic Party to the Serbian Public". The petition called for Milošević to resign and for elections for a constituent assembly to be held without delay, citing his responsibility for the crushing defeat suffered by Serbia "on the national, economic and social levels", as well as having been "left as the greatest losers in the breakup of Yugoslavia". The DS petition was signed by the Serbian Renewal Movement (SPO), New Democracy, the Serbian Liberal Party (SLS), the People's Peasant Party (NSS) and the recently renamed Reformist Party, previously the Serbian section of the Union of Reform Forces of Yugoslavia. It would ultimately gather 840,000 signatures.

The opposition held a rally on 9 March, the anniversary of the 1991 Belgrade protests. Around 50,000 opposition supporters gathered outside the Church of Saint Sava, where they were addressed by the head of the Serbian Orthodox Church, Patriarch Pavle. Despite the considerable pressure exerted on him to dissuade him from speaking, Pavle addressed the crowd in opposition to the "fratricidal war". Concurrently, renewed student protests were organized at Terazije. The rally was opposed by President of Republika Srpska Radovan Karadžić. This meeting would start renewed calls for unifying the opposition, especially from a group of Serbian intellectuals gathered around Matija Bećković, Borislav Mihajlović Mihiz and Predrag Palavestra. The three had previously formed the royalist Crown Council of the Karađorđević dynasty on 15 February.

The DS led by Dragoljub Mićunović ultimately declined to join a new alliance after meeting with the group of intellectuals on 1 and 21 April. He would argue against the idea of a "grand coalition", as well as citing ideological differences between his left-wing faction of the party which had its origins in the Praxis School and the coalition, which was anti-secular, monarchist and employed Chetnik imagery. SPO leader Vuk Drašković agreed to join this coalition and met with Crown Prince Alexander of Yugoslavia to discuss his support, as well as with the right wing of the DS centered around Vojislav Koštunica and Vladeta Janković. He announced the formation of this coalition on 13 May at Ravna Gora in an address to supporters of his party, adding its main goal would be overthrowing communism.

== History ==
=== Formation ===
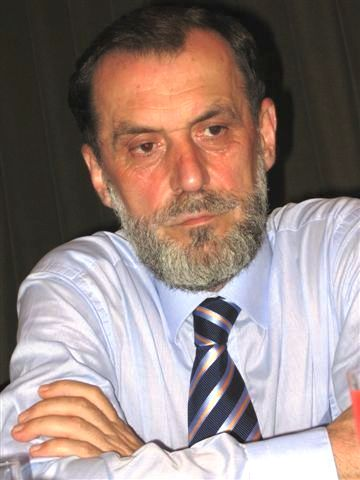
Vuk Drašković, President of the Serbian Renewal Movement and leader of the DEPOS coalition

Following the formation of the Federal Republic of Yugoslavia on 27 April 1992, the Serbian and Montenegrin members of the Federal Council of the Yugoslav parliament brought forward a new electoral law and called for new elections on 31 May without previously consulting with opposition parties. Because of this, as well as the opposition being allowed neither equal access to the media during the campaign nor adequate financial help from the state, the opposition decided to boycott the May 1992 parliamentary election in both Serbia and Montenegro.

The DEPOS coalition held its first meeting on 23 May 1992. It defined its main goal as the establishment of a democratic order in Serbia, and called for canceling the elections scheduled for 31 May and a round table between the government and opposition parties with the goal of preparing free and fair elections for a constituent assembly which would decide on its preferred form of rule. The coalition advocated for a democratic Serbian state aligned with the international community with the goal of securing Serbia's place among "the union of free and civilized nations of the world".

The DEPOS initially included the SPO, SLS, New Democracy and the Peasants Party of Serbia (SSS). While DS leader Dragoljub Mićunović refused to join the DEPOS due to important differences in ideology and identity, a faction under Vojislav Koštunica styling themselves the "Democrats for DEPOS" emerged. The faction hailed broadly from the right or anti-communist wing of the DS who had remained in the party following the departure of the SLS under Kosta Čavoški. A prominent member the group rallied around was the writer Borislav Pekić, who espoused a more democratic nationalist program for the DS. Despite his death in May 1992, his circle separated from the DS on 26 July and transformed into the Democratic Party of Serbia (DSS) which would join the DEPOS. Its youth wing was named the Alliance of Democratic Youth of Serbia after the interwar Democratic Party's youth organization which Pekić had been a member of. Inside the DEPOS, the DSS was especially backed by some of the DEPOS intellectuals less keen on backing Drašković, like Matija Bećković.

=== Vidovdan Assembly ===
From 28 June to 5 July 1992, the DEPOS coalition organized the Vidovdan Assembly. Meetings were held every day in front of the Federal Assembly building in Belgrade. Citizens were addressed by Drašković, Bećković, Vladeta Janković and Nikola Milošević in front of DEPOS and Vojislav Koštunica in front of the Democrats for DEPOS faction, as well as prominent public figures such as Patriarch Pavle, Crown Prince Alexander, the actor Miloš Žutić and Dragan Đilas, the leader of a concurrent student protest. The assembly called for President Milošević to step down, as well as the formation of a "government of national salvation". It was attended by around 200 to 500 thousand people according to foreign observers, with the Studio B citing the number of 700 thousand. The government refused to step down, but agreed to a round table where the electoral system would be discussed, with the government supporting a first-past-the-post system and the opposition a proportional one.

The DEPOS was formally founded as a political organization on 28 August 1992 in Belgrade. In addition to the SPO, DSS, SLS, ND and SSS, the DEPOS was also joined by a group of independent public figures including the painter Mića Popović, the architect Ivan Antić, as well as writers Danko Popović, Slobodan Selenić and Ljubomir Simović.

=== December 1992 election ===
In July 1992, Milošević invited Serbian American businessman Milan Panić to take over the position of Federal Prime Minister, trying to project a more moderate image for the government both at home and abroad. However, a rift formed between the two almost immediately, and in early August the federal government stated its support for the opposition's proposal for early elections. The elections were ultimately held under a proportional system.

In late October 1992, the National Assembly acquiesced to the opposition's demands and decided to hold elections at all levels. On 27 October, the constitutional electoral law was modified and a new law on local government was passed, allowing the opposition to capitalize on its activities during the previous two years. Federal President Dobrica Ćosić emerged as an ally in Panić's split with Milošević, and on 3 November, Drašković invited him to unite the opposition for the election. Panić gathered the opposition for round table talks on several occasions, where they agreed to form the short-lived Democratic Coalition (DEKO). The DEKO would include the DEPOS, the DS, the Civic Alliance of Serbia (GSS) and Čedomir Mirković's Social Democratic Party. However, it split two days later, and a decision was made to participate in the election in two separate lists, with the DS and the DEPOS each putting forth separate candidates. In addition to the DS, the SSS also ran independently. The DEPOS decided to participate in the election after internal deliberation, a move largely opposed by the DSS and SLS who favored a boycott, and supported by the SPO and ND. The coalition agreed to support Vuk Drašković as presidential candidate on 17 November.

In late November, Ćosić decided against formally endorsing any opposition party, despite the DS trying to win his support due to his disapproval of monarchist imagery promoted by the DEPOS. Panić's ministers from the SPS started resigning, and he replaced several with DS members and Social Democrats. This caused several voices from the DEPOS to speak out against him accusing him of harboring leftist biases, mainly the SLS and the leader of SPO's parliamentary group Slobodan Rakitić.

Despite this, Panić eventually became the presidential candidate supported by DEPOS during the 1992 presidential election. He presented his signatures last minute on 30 November, and faced legal obstacles from the Electoral Commission in early December. After these were resolved by the Supreme Court, Drašković revoked his candidature on 10 December to endorse Panić. His campaign focused on removing UN sanctions, ending the Bosnian War and reintegrating Serbia into the global community. Panić asked the Western bloc for a temporary suspension of the sanctions in the run-up to the election as a statement of support for the opposition. Their refusal was seen by some DEPOS members as implicit support for Milošević, particularly Matija Bećković. The DEPOS moderated their image in comparison to the SPO campaign for the 1990 election, focusing on reconciliation. They criticized the SPS for not cutting ties with their communist roots, which they claimed created structural and economic problems, and stifled democracy.

The December 1992 elections ended in a crushing defeat for the opposition. The DEPOS was forced into third place after the up until then marginal Serbian Radical Party (SRS). However, they achieved significant victories in the local elections in some of Belgrade's central municipalities such as Stari Grad, Vračar, Savski Venac, Zvezdara and Voždovac. Unable to form a coalition government with the SRS to oust Milošević due to personal animosity between Drašković and SRS president Vojislav Šešelj, the DEPOS ultimately remained in the opposition while the SRS gave minority support to a new SPS government.

=== Parliamentary boycott ===
On 28 January 1993, changes were instituted regarding the functioning of the Chamber of Republics whereby the upper house of the Federal Assembly would become dominated by the SPS and SRS. The move was initiated by the Radicals. As a response, DEPOS MP's staged a walkout, also supported by the DS. On 2 February, DSS leader Vojislav Koštunica declared that the DEPOS would boycott the parliament. The DS would join in the boycott.

The DEPOS' decision to boycott the parliament led to disagreement within the coalition on a viable extra-parliamentary strategy. The DSS advocated for the formation of a "movement of civic resistance" modeled on the Polish Solidarity movement. The SPO failed to repeat their victory in attracting a mass of protesters on the anniversary of the 9 March protest. The DEPOS leaders met with Patriarch Pavle on 25 March. At the meeting, the Patriarch appealed to the leaders of the parties and Matija Bećković to resume parliamentary work.

Without consulting the coalition, the SPO decided to resume parliamentary work on 15 April. New Democracy also returned to parliament at this time. This move was heavily criticized by the rest of DEPOS, including the DSS, SLS and the grouping of independent intellectuals. By late April, the coalition between the SPO and DSS had functionally fallen apart.

=== Splits within the SPO ===
Former allies Koštunica and Drašković further split during April and May on the issue of the Vance-Owen Peace Plan for ending the ongoing Bosnian War. The SPO had joined the ruling SPS, as well as the opposition DS and GSS, in support of the peace plan. This was the culmination of Drašković's slow adoption of anti-war positions starting in late 1991. The DSS and SLS, along with the ruling SRS, would condemn the plan in support of the Bosnian Serbs, who rejected it at the Bijeljina Assembly on 25 April.

The issue of the Vance-Owen Plan led to a split within the SPO. A faction, led by Vice President and leader of the DEPOS parliamentary group in the Federal Assembly Slobodan Rakitić, came out in opposition to the plan and accused the SPO of betraying its hard-line nationalist roots. After Vuk Drašković's wife Danica Drašković made a controversial remark in an interview on 11 April against the expulsion of Bosniaks from Vuk's ancestral Gacko, Rakitić's group criticized her influence on Vuk to which they attributed his drift to more moderate positions. Outvoted at a meeting of the SPO Main Committee on 30 April where these issues were discussed, Rakitić resigned from the position of Vice President of the party and left the SPO, but remained the leader of the DEPOS' parliamentary group.

The factions reconciled in June 1993 prompted by Drašković's arrest on 1 June. Other opposition parties such as the DS and DSS supported Drašković's release, and a particularly strong role was played by the GSS, led by former Reformist Party leader Vesna Pešić, and the SLS. On 27 June, the DEPOS held a rally to commemorate the anniversary of its founding. The crowd was addressed by academician Predrag Palavestra. The following day, speaking from prison, Drašković made Rakitić the acting leader of the SPO and initiated a hunger strike. He was pardoned by President Milošević on 9 July, under pressure from both the opposition and foreign leaders such as Konstantinos Mitsotakis, John Major and François Mitterrand.

=== 1993 election ===
In the fall of 1993, tensions were rising in the ruling SPS-SRS coalition, which had its roots in Milošević's acceptance of the Vance-Owen Peace Plan for Bosnia and Herzegovina. The two parties went into open conflict in July 1993 during the adoption of the new budget, which the SRS would condition on changes in military leadership. The conflict culminated in September when the SRS initiated a motion of no confidence against the government of Nikola Šainović.

After spending a month in Greece, Vuk Drašković addressed a rally in Valjevo on 7 October where he announced that the SPO and New Democracy would not vote for the SRS' vote of no confidence, instead suggesting a transitional government and new elections. Unlike the SPO, the DSS and DS announced their support of the motion of no confidence, which they saw as an opportunity. The SPO and New Democracy's decision to abstain was widely seen as supportive of the SPS government at the time, particularly after Drašković's assault charges from June were finally dropped on 6 October. However, after an incident of police violence on 12 October, the two parties requested an apology and resignation of Interior Minister Zoran Sokolović. Sokolović apologized, but refused to resign, leading to the DEPOS coming out in support of the SRS' vote of no confidence on 15 October. Facing defeat, Milošević dissolved the parliament on 20 October and called for new elections on 19 December.

After signaling his unwillingness to join a renewed DEPOS coalition throughout the fall, DSS President Vojislav Koštunica finally publicly stated that the DSS would participate in the election without coalition partners on 28 October. Their decision came with the support of Matija Bećković, as well as the SLS who withdrew from the DEPOS and decided to boycott the election. A high-ranking member of the SLS, Milan Božić, decided to remain with the DEPOS at this time and later became Drašković's key advisor. The decision of the DSS to participate independently came primarily as a result of the SPO drifting from its nationalist credentials.

The DEPOS was joined on 15 November by the Civic Alliance of Serbia (GSS) led by Vesna Pešić. The GSS and SPO had cooperated throughout 1993 in opposing the war and in their advocacy for international peace proposals, as the SPO had evolved into a civic-national position. The entry of the GSS into DEPOS was the culmination of this trend, and the SPO would campaign against their former allies, the DSS, for their policy of solidarity with Republika Srpska. In the 1993 election, the DEPOS would ultimately consist of the SPO, New Democracy and the GSS.

The Democratic Movement of Serbia, weakened by the withdrawal of the DSS from the coalition, achieved a slightly worse result compared to the previous elections. DEPOS slipped from almost 800,000 votes to 715,000, winning 45 seats, five less than in 1992. This probably came as a result of the independent performance of the DSS. However, with the 1993 election, the DEPOS managed to consolidate its base of support, and became the second largest parliamentary grouping. The coalition scored victories in the central Belgrade municipalities of Stari Grad and Vračar.

=== Dissolution ===
In the immediate aftermath of the election, the DSS proposed a grand coalition of opposition parties, including the DSS, DS, DEPOS, SRS and the Hungarian minority DZVM. This proposal proved impractical and President Milošević started talks about forming a unity government with one of the individual opposition parties in late January 1994.

The election led to further deepening splits within the DEPOS. Slobodan Rakitić's faction, including himself and ten other MP's in the Federal Assembly, announced their decision to leave the SPO and continue as a separate group on 12 January. They cited the SPO's departure from democratic nationalist positions and evolution into civic positions, exemplified in its support of the Vance-Owen plan, as their main grievance. The SPO requested that they return their seats to the party, but the group argued that they were entitled to their seats, having been elected under the DEPOS name instead of the SPO. Their position was supported by the SPS and SRS for tactical reasons, and Rakitić's group would continue to operate in the federal parliament under the DEPOS name until January 1995, when they formed the Assembly National Party, harkening back to the Vidovdan Assembly of 1992. A split occurred within the GSS as well, with Ljubiša Rajić, one of the editors of the magazine Republika, quitting his post after accusing the party of departing from its social democratic credentials into more liberal positions.

The coalition was dissolved in February 1994 after New Democracy entered into a coalition government with the Socialist Party of Serbia. Despite holding talks with the SPO and DS in late January, Milošević managed to secure a majority with the ND on 23 February. The ND agreed to two ministers and two deputy prime ministers, vowing to influence the government's policy from the inside. Founding member and Vice President of the GSS, Ratomir Tanić, defected to the ND in September 1994.

Despite the setback and dissolution of the coalition, the SPO and GSS continued to cooperate, allying with the DS in early 1996. The three parties would ultimately form the Together coalition in September 1996.

== Members ==
Name	Abrr	Leader	Main ideology	Political position	MPs (1992)	MPs (1993)
Serbian Renewal Movement; Српски покрет обнове Srpski pokret obnove	SPO	Vuk Drašković	Monarchism National liberalism	Center-right	30 / 250	37 / 250
New Democracy; Нова демократија Nova demokratija	ND	Dušan Mihajlović	Liberalism; National liberalism	Center	1 / 250	6 / 250
Democratic Party of Serbia; Демократска странка Србије; Demokratska stranka Srbije	DSS	Vojislav Koštunica	National conservatism Christian democracy	Center-right	18 / 250	—N/a
Serbian Liberal Party; Српска либерална странка Srpska liberalna stranka	SLS	Nikola Milošević	Conservative liberalism Serbian nationalism	Right-wing	1 / 250	—N/a
Civic Alliance of Serbia; Грађански савез Србије; Građanski savez Srbije	GSS	Vesna Pešić	Liberalism Anti-nationalism	Center	—N/a	2 / 250

== Electoral results ==
=== Parliamentary elections ===
Year	Popular vote	% of popular vote	# of seats	Seat change	Status
1992	797.831	16.89%	50 / 250	▲50	opposition
1993	715,564	16.64%	45 / 250	▼5	opposition

=== Presidential election ===
Election year	#	Candidate	1st round votes	%	2nd round votes	%
1992	2nd	Milan Panić	1,516,693	32.11	—	—N/a

^{note:} Independent candidate, support

== See also ==
- Democratic Opposition of Serbia
