= Vladan Vasilijević =

Yugoslav criminal law expert

Vladan Vasilijević was Yugoslav human rights lawyer. Throughout the 1990s he was engaged as a human rights lawyer promoting a democratic civil society and the rule of law in Serbia. In December 1989 he was one of the members of the Founding Committee of the Democratic Party. The Democratic Party was the first non-communist opposition party in Serbia. Later he left the Democratic Party to join the Serbian Liberal Party led by Kosta Čavoški and Nikola Milošević.

He died on 29 April 1997 in Belgrade after suffering a heart attack while participating in a discussion at city hall.
