= 1991 protests in Belgrade =

Series of protests in 1991

1991 protests in Belgrade Devetomartovski protesti
- Part of Breakup of Yugoslavia
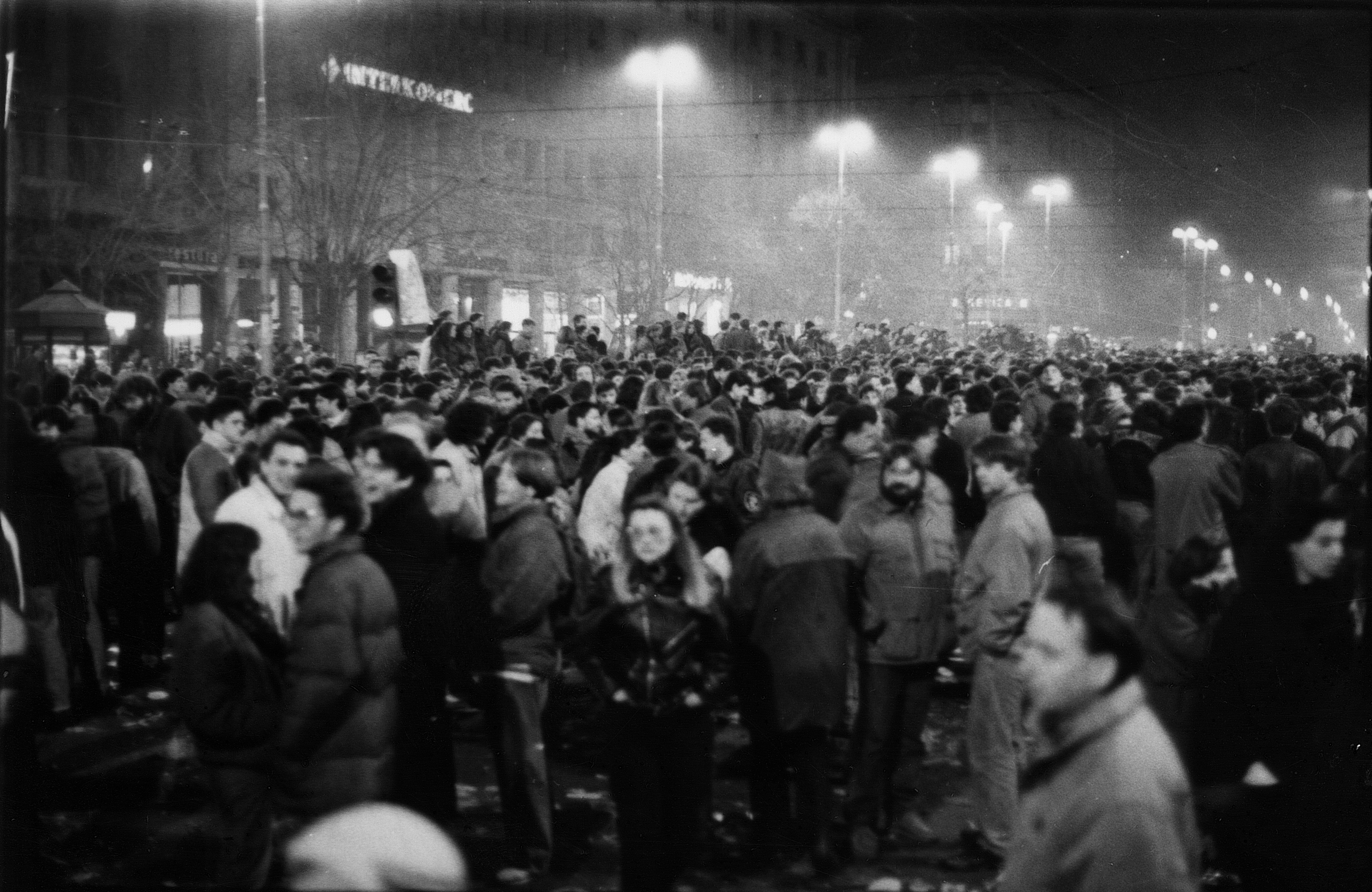
- A scene from the protest
- Date: March 9, 1991 – March 14, 1991
- Location: Belgrade
- Goals: Political neutrality of Radio Television Belgrade; Resignation of Dušan Mitević and four other editors and on-air personalities; Resignation of Radmilo Bogdanović
- Methods: Demonstrations, occupations, rioting
- Result: SPO pyrrhic victory: Dušan Mitević resigns; Radmilo Bogdanović resigns; Ban lifted on Radio B92 and RTV Studio B; Vuk Drašković and Jovan Marjanović released

Parties
(Serbia) SPO-led anti-government protesters: Civilian and student protesters; Opposition parties: Serbian Renewal Movement; Democratic Party; New Democracy; Serbian Liberal Party	(Socialist Federal Republic of Yugoslavia) Government of Yugoslavia: Ministry of Defence; Yugoslav People's Army; Ministry of the Interior; State Security Service (before 13 March); State Security Directorate (after 13 March); (Socialist Republic of Serbia) Government of Serbia: Ministry of Interior; Milicija; Government parties: Socialist Party of Serbia

Lead figures
Vuk Drašković; Vida Ognjenović; Dragoljub Mićunović; Zoran Đinđić; Vojislav Koštunica; Borislav Pekić	Slobodan Milošević; Borisav Jović; Veljko Kadijević; Blagoje Adžić

Number
500,000	Over 10,000 policemen

Casualties and losses
1 protester killed	1 policeman killed

Protests took place in 1991 on the streets of Belgrade, the capital of Serbia and Yugoslavia when a protest rally turned into a riot featuring vicious clashes between the protesters and police.

The initial mass rally that took place on 9 March 1991 was organized by Vuk Drašković's Serbian Renewal Movement (SPO), an opposition political party in Serbia, protesting the rule of Slobodan Milošević and his Socialist Party of Serbia, particularly their misuse of Radio Television Belgrade. Two people died in the ensuing violence, and the government then ordered the Yugoslav People's Army onto the city streets. The police detained several prominent SPO officials and banned two media outlets considered unfriendly to the government. The protests are referred to in Serbian as Devetomartovski protest, i.e. the March 9 protest, after this initial event.

The next day, in reaction to the events of the previous day, more protests drew large and diverse crowds, including leaders of the Democratic Party (DS), with some referring to it as a "Velvet Revolution". The next day still, the government supporters responded by organizing a counter-rally of their own. The protests ended on March 14 as the leaders of SPO were released from police custody. The government replaced the director of the state TV as well as the Minister of the Interior.

== Background ==
Beset by a multitude of political and economic issues, Socialist Federal Republic of Yugoslavia still existed in March 1991, with Socialist Republic of Serbia as its biggest and most populous constituent part. Multi-party political system had been introduced less than a year earlier, in 1990, meaning that instead of the Communist League's (SKJ) Serbian branch (SKS) that exclusively ruled for 45 years, Serbia's political landscape was once again, for the first time since the early 1940s, dotted with many parties.

However, only three parties could boast any kind of actual significance: Slobodan Milošević's Socialist Party of Serbia (SPS), Drašković's Serbian Renewal Movement (SPO), and Democratic Party (DS) led at the time by Dragoljub Mićunović and featuring high-ranking members Zoran Đinđić and Vojislav Koštunica who would both later rise to greater prominence.

In addition to political turbulence in each of the country's six constituent republics, the security situation in SFR Yugoslavia was deteriorating as well. Incidents were especially frequent in the Socialist Republic of Croatia where the two constituent ethnic groups — Croats and Serbs — began clashing following the May 1990 election victory of the Croatian Democratic Union (HDZ) that pursued secessionism from the Yugoslav federation, a policy which the Serbs protested and actively obstructed by engaging in a series of actions collectively termed the Log Revolution. By spring 1991, the situation in SR Croatia got extremely tense, and just days before the March 9 protest in Belgrade, the incident in Pakrac occurred.

Meanwhile, in SR Serbia, Milošević firmly controlled all the pillars of power: he himself was the President of the Republic; his party SPS, thanks to its huge parliamentary majority (194 seats out of 250), easily formed a stable government headed by prime minister Dragutin Zelenović. Additionally, through party-installed people like the Radio Television Belgrade general-director Dušan Mitević, Milošević had a tight grip on the most important and influential media outlets, often using them for his own ends, although still not as blatantly and brazenly as he would later throughout the 1990s once the wars and UN sanctions set in.

On the other hand, opposition led most prominently by SPO (19 parliamentary seats out of 250) and to a lesser extent DS (7 seats) was often plagued by internal squabbles, ego clashes, and low-level skullduggery.

Though Drašković and SPO had already been engaged in the, often dirty and personal, political battle with Slobodan Milošević, his wife Mira Marković, and their allies within the Serbian administration, this antagonism particularly intensified following the joint parliamentary and presidential elections of December 9, 1990 where Milošević and Socialist Party of Serbia (SPS) scored an overwhelming victory, but Drašković also had a notable showing with over 800,000 votes in the presidential race that made him the most significant opposition figure. Since their access to state-controlled media, either print or electronic, was fairly limited, Drašković and his party frequently criticized and ridiculed Serbian leadership through the SPO-published weekly magazine Srpska reč, edited by his wife Danica. One of the issues in February 1991 depicted Mira Marković with a Stalin-like moustache and a headline "Šta hoće generali" (What Do Generals Want).

The administration's answer was an anti-SPO commentary read by TV Belgrade's journalist Slavko Budihna during central daily newscast Dnevnik 2 on February 16, 1991. Among other things Budihna read:

...nearly all of appearances by SPO members in the media, including the letter to Franjo Tuđman, published in Vjesnik this week, have finally revealed in full sight what was clear long ago – that the Serbian political right is fully prepared to co-operate with pro-Ustashe and profascist Croatia, or any other extreme right movement for that matter, despite it being against the vital historical interests of the Serbian people.... The Serbian citizens' interests are of no concern to the SPO members, their only aim is to use the dissatisfaction as well as the difficult position Serbian and Yugoslav economies find themselves in to create chaos in Serbia. Such a scenario, rehearsed and performed from Chile to Romania, is well-known and easily recognized, but in Serbia it won't and it mustn't play out.

The following day, February 17, the commentary got published in its entirety in that day's issue of Politika ekspres daily. Drašković's response to this blatant misuse of the media was to demand an immediate retraction, but several days later on February 19 TV Belgrade management, specifically its news division chief Predrag Vitas, turned him down explaining that "retractions are issued only in the cases of dissemination of inaccurate information, but not for commentaries". Determined not to let this go, the following day, February 20, Drašković issued a call to the streets for March 9 where the protesters would publicly demand the retraction of the original defamatory piece. From then on Drašković often referred to TV Belgrade in derisive terms as "TV Bastille":

To SPO members and sympathizers. Dear friends! TV Belgrade continues to spread lies about us. In the commentary broadcast during TV Belgrade's Dnevnik 2 on February 16 they said we co-operate with pro-Ustashe Croatia and that we're creating chaos in Serbia. They won't issue a retraction. They're convinced they can get away with anything. Those journalists on their staff with conscience and professional integrity are being persecuted and fired. The municipal elections are coming up. They're obviously intent on repeating the propaganda crime that, along with election theft, led the communists to election victory in December. We mustn't let them get away with it this time. We must liberate TV Bastille. Let's gather on Saturday, March 9, at high noon, at our old spot on the Republic Square in front of Prince Mihailo. From there we'll go towards the TV Belgrade building. The fortress of lies must fall. No force should scare us, nor stop us. Almost all of the TV Belgrade employees are with us. The entire democratic Serbia is with us. All free television stations and all of the free journalists of the world are also with us. With bravery and strength on March 9 at noon in front of Prince Mihailo.

Still, while the immediate cause for the demonstration was ostensibly specific and narrow, this protest also had a wider ideological aspect. From its very name Protest against red star over to numerous examples of royalist insignia among the crowds, Drašković was very much whipping up old Chetnik – Partisan issues that were at the time beginning to be talked about again publicly after almost 50 years.

When SPO called the protest for March 9, DS was on the fence. Their relationship with SPO at the time was somewhat on the cool side because two of DS prominent figures, Kosta Čavoški (one of the 13 founders) and Nikola Milošević (high-ranking member), recently left the party to form their own and were now openly co-operating with SPO. On top of that, ideologically speaking, the two parties had very little in common other than their general anti-Milošević stance. And this protest initially was not clearly anti-Milošević as much as it was brought on by the feud SPO had with state TV.

In the end, no DS members were on the list of speakers but many still decided to show up at the protest in their individual capacity.

The motives for the protest varied. It has been variously described as an anti-war protest, or as a protest against the confrontational policies of the SPS, particularly against their complete exclusion of the opposition from state politics.

== Protest ==
=== Lead-up to the March 9 rally ===
In the days following Drašković's call to the streets, SPO reiterated its demand for the retraction of the controversial newscast commentary, but also formulated an official list of demands. They wanted the Serbian National Assembly, as an institution that founded TV Belgrade, to "prohibit SPS and SK-PzJ from creating and conducting the television network's editorial and staff hiring policies". They also wanted TV Belgrade's two channels to be "non-partisan and accessible to all political parties in proportion to their size and voter strength". Furthermore, they demanded resignations from the key TV Belgrade personnel — director Dušan Mitević, as well as four other editors and on-air personalities: Slavko Budihna, Predrag Vitas (head of the news division), Ivan Krivec, and Sergej Šestakov. And finally, they demanded "cessation of the practice of obstructing the work of Studio B and Yutel". Other opposition parties, including the Democratic Party (DS), People's Peasant Party (NSS), People's Radical Party (NRS), New Democracy (ND), Democratic Forum, and Liberal Party, joined and supported the set of demands.

In the days leading up to the protest Milošević seemed intent not to let it take place.

On Thursday, March 7, the city of Belgrade police branch issued a special junction banning the protest while citing "the location and the time of day when the rally is scheduled as disruptive to the public order and unobstructed flow of traffic". As an alternative, they suggested the wide open space at Ušće as the location for the protest, but SPO immediately refused to move the protest location.

Seeing that the gathering at the Republic Square would not be allowed by the police thus realizing the potential for street clashes, Drašković appeared interested in some kind of a last-minute mediation attempt or indirect deal by having his SPO MPs call for an immediate parliamentary meeting. However, they were flatly rejected by the SPS majority. Finally, on March 8, just one day before the scheduled protest, SPO MPs demanded a personal meeting with Milošević in his cabinet, but this time Milošević didn't even dignify their request with a response.

Milošević's administration appeared confident, even arrogant, about possessing enough means and support to stop the protest from taking place.

=== March 9 ===
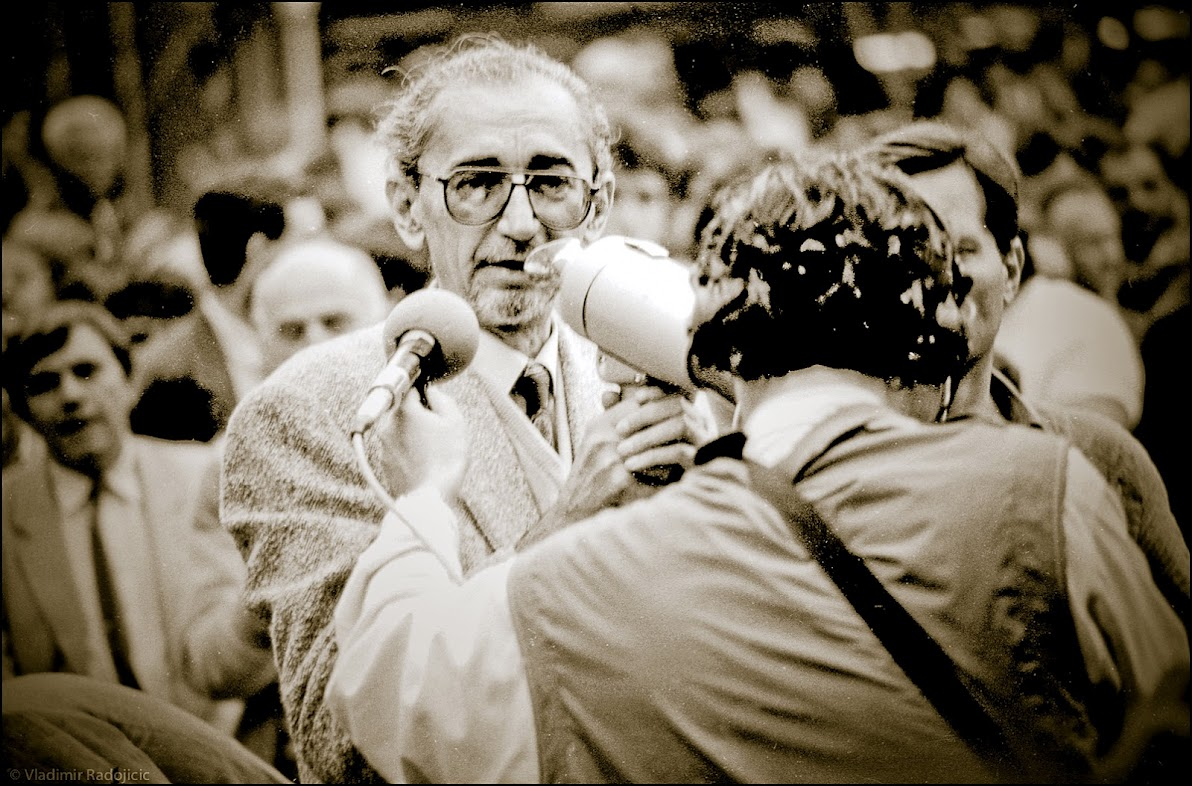
Renowned Serbian writer Borislav Pekić was one of many well-known Serbs at the protest

March 9, 1991 was a pleasant, partly sunny, slightly windy Saturday in late winter. The protest was scheduled to take place at the Republic Square in Belgrade, a wide open area right in the city's downtown core. In the early morning, the square was already filled with a substantial crowd. The police presence was also heavy. Just after 10 a.m. the police (consisting of members from all over Serbia as well as the police reserve members) established control over most streets in the city centre and blocked major roads heading into Belgrade.

This led to numerous incidents throughout different parts of the city centre before the protest rally even started as the police tried, often brutally, to impede the stream of people heading to the square. Soon after, the battles started at the square itself as the police started using armoured vehicles, water cannons, and tear gas in an attempt to drive the protesters out of the square. Enraged protesters immediately began responding, some of them armed with sticks, traffic sign poles, crowbars or whatever else they could get their hands on. The crowd from the adjoining streets jeered the police, chanting angrily at them to "go to Pakrac" or to "go to Kosovo". Some of the others from the crowd that managed to get into the square made allusions to the Romanian Revolution of 1989 chanting "alea alea Securitatea" while calling Milošević a fascist.

While battles and skirmishes were already taking place for more than an hour, mass bedlam started around 11:30 a.m. when a large crowd of protesters held in check up to that point near the Ruski car restaurant managed to break through the police cordon. Yelling "Ustaše, Ustaše" at the police, the protesters started moving further into the square near the monument while the police tried unsuccessfully to stop them with a water cannon.

Simultaneously, the scheduled speakers, including Drašković, had trouble making it into the square. Along with his entourage consisting of some 200 SPO members, a little after 11:30 a.m. Drašković was being held at the intersection of November 29 Street and Vašingtonova Street, surrounded by the police cordon that didn't want to let them join the protesters at the Republic Square. He tried to reason with them, appealing with their chiefs to let him into the square "in order to calm the crowd and prevent bloodshed". Some 15 minutes later, the police let them through without much resistance.

Getting into the square, the impressive crowd size probably surprised even Drašković himself as the entire area was literally flooded with people. Flanked by the individuals loyal to him (including several prominent members of the Belgrade underworld such as Đorđe "Giška" Božović and Aleksandar "Knele" Knežević who essentially acted as his bodyguards), Drašković climbed the Prince Mihailo Monument and attempted to address the large crowd using a megaphone.

Estimates on the number of people in the crowd vary: under 70,000, around 100,000, or in excess of 150,000.

Realizing very few could hear him, Drašković then decided to seek permission from nearby National Theater personnel to address the crowds from its balcony, which provided a nice view of the entire square.

Permission was granted by then-director Vida Ognjenović (incidentally a prominent DS member), so Drašković took to the balcony and began a fiery speech often interrupted by thunderous applause:

Serbia, may God give us the dawn of freedom in our homeland as well.

I'm not going to tell you everything that has happened since this morning; we all broke through different police barriers and therein showed that no obstacle will stop us.

I salute you, heroes!

I said it a month ago – even when the Bolsheviks didn't believe me – and I'll say it again right this moment: today, in front of our righteous Prince (referring to the statue of Prince Mihailo Obrenović that dominates the square), and especially in a few moments when we start marching on TV Bastille, we will show Serbian heart and we will show Serbian persistence.

Unfortunately, we have no other way!

Heroes, I remind you of the words of our pan-Serbian patriarch of our pan-Serbian mind, vladika Njegoš: ‘Svak je rođen za po jednom mreti’ (Everyone is born to die once). They've got until 3:30 p.m. to issue a retraction and tender resignations and if they do that we'll return here to this pan-Serb gathering of national unity. Because of the brutal police charge on the unarmed people, we also demand that the Minister of the Interior resign at the very next parliamentary session.

The President of the Republic [Slobodan Milošević] has to weigh between two choices in front of him: on one end of the scale are your lives as well as lives of many policemen because I heard our boys seized a lot of automatic weaponry in fights with police today – on that scale there are so many lives, Serbia's freedom, honour, and peace – while on the other end of the scale there are only 5 resignations and 1 retraction.

Let the President decide what he wants, I have made my choice: I will lead the charge on Television today, fully ready to die!

His last proclamation put the present police squadron (led by Milošević loyalist Radovan "Badža" Stojičić) in full alert mode. After Drašković finished, other people took the microphone, among them Milan Paroški, Žarko Jokanović, Leon Koen, Milan Komnenić and Borislav Mihajlović Mihiz. Dragoslav Bokan and Borislav Pekić were also present.

Around noon, in the middle of Mihiz's speech, police moved into the square with tear gas and a full-blown battle began. However, overwhelmed and outnumbered by the crowd the police retreated while trying to keep the angry protesters in check with water cannons. The situation was deteriorating by the second, flower beds were being overturned and broken off into smaller pieces of concrete to be thrown onto police vehicles. Drašković did not seem fazed by scenes of violence below, and if anything was only spurring them on. At one point he even bizarrely yelled "Juuuuuuriš" (Chaaaaaarge) into the microphone the way a field general would at the scene of battle.

The protest then spilled into adjoining streets and squares and most of the downtown Belgrade soon resembled a war zone. By this time, the police managed to regroup and reinforce their numbers and began responding and attacking a lot more forcefully.

Still, for about seven hours the protesters almost controlled the city as the majority of the police was guarding the TV Belgrade building and Dedinje. According to sources, some 200 policemen and 180 security guards in addition to 200 television staffers with basic military training who were given AK-47s were guarding the television building.

In the afternoon, Drašković, along with a large group of protesters, unsuccessfully attempted to storm the National Assembly of Serbia session. As he exited the building, he was arrested along with SPO deputy president Jovan Marjanović. Among the policemen handling Drašković's arrest was Naser Orić.

Serbian President Slobodan Milošević demanded that the Presidency of Yugoslavia deploys troops of the Yugoslav People's Army to suppress the protest. Borisav Jović contacted other members of the Presidency by phone and the Army was indeed deployed, but the Slovenians later claimed the move was made unconstitutionally.

In the evening, Milošević took to the public airwaves to address the nation. While not mentioning anyone by name he characterized the day's events as being orchestrated by "forces of chaos and madness threatening to restore everything that the people of Serbia rose against half a century ago".

Tanks and armored cars rolled onto the streets.

Radio B92 and Studio B television were banned and stopped broadcasting. Additionally, 203 protesters were injured and further 108 were arrested on March 9.

636 people were arrested following the protest.

=== Casualties ===
The protest claimed two lives. On March 9 around 3:30 pm while running away from the crowd of protesters in Masarikova Street near Beograđanka, 54-year-old policeman Nedeljko Kosović died from repeated blows to the head.

Later in the day, 17-year-old protester Branivoje Milinović was killed by a stray bullet. The circumstances of his death are conflicting as some reports claim he died as the crowd was storming the SR Serbia parliament building while others say he was killed by a rubber bullet when a group of policemen on the corner of Admirala Geprata Street and Kneza Miloša street opened fire in the direction of protesters in front of London Cafe. The investigation into his death was recently reopened.

=== March 10 ===
The next day, March 10, Belgrade awoke to the anti-opposition headline "Rušilački pohod" (Destructive Crusade) on the front page of Politika, the most important of the four dailies being published in the city at the time. Edited by the Milošević loyalist Žika Minović, the rest of that day's issue was not much different — of the 51 total pieces about the previous day's events, 49 presented a strong condemnation of the opposition, SPO, and Drašković. Večernje novosti, edited by Rade Brajović, ran a fairly balanced March 10 issue, mostly covering the events neutrally and avoiding emotional outbursts in favour of either side. However, according to the paper's journalist Miroslav Turudić, at the staff meeting that very Sunday evening the editor-in-chief Brajović objected to the paper's coverage of the protests. Along with deciding to steer the coverage in the following day's issue clearly to the Milošević's side, Brajović also published a commentary in which he openly criticizes his staff's previous coverage of the protests.

DS held a press conference with its president Dragoljub Mićunović as well as members Zoran Đinđić and Vojislav Koštunica on hand, voicing support to arrested Drašković and SPO while condemning government actions. Đinđić described the events of the previous day as "the police carrying out a plan, a one man's personal plan, one man who decided that this protest cannot and will not happen" going on to say that "the catastrophe occurred due to the inability of those giving orders to the police to adapt to the rapidly changing situation on the ground".

During late evening hours, a large crowd again began to gather, but this time in front of the Terazije fountain. The protest now assumed a more civil tone, although there were still incidents on Branko's Bridge when a group of 5,000 University of Belgrade students heading into the city centre from their residence in Studentski Grad in order to join the protesters got stopped by police. Pepper spray was used and some of the students were beaten, but all of them were eventually allowed to pass through and join the crowd at Terazije (among the individuals negotiating with the police on the bridge was a Democratic Party (DS) member Zoran Đinđić).

Gatherings in front of the Terazije fountain were notably led and moderated by actor Branislav Lečić with various figures from Serbian public life such as screenwriter Dušan Kovačević, actor Rade Šerbedžija, and even Serbian Patriarch Pavle taking turns addressing the crowd. In his speeches, Lečić often referred to the rally as "Velvet Revolution" while holding a stuffed panda toy and drawing parallels with the Czechoslovak protests of November 1989.

The protest also expanded in terms of the political figures that joined it with DS members now officially taking part. The anti-government component was now much more prominently displayed among the crowds. The protesters, composed largely of students, demanded freedom for Drašković and Jovan Marjanović. In addition to earlier protests for the resignation of Dušan Mitević, they now wanted the Minister of Interior Radmilo Bogdanović to resign too. They also sought the lifting of the broadcast ban for Radio B92 and RTV Studio B.

=== March 11 ===
On March 11, the Serbian government regrouped by organising a mass counter-rally at their old stomping grounds Ušće. Called under the name "For the defense of the Republic, for constitutionality, freedom, and democracy", the rally attempted to show that protesters at the Republic Square and Terazije in no way represented the wishes and desires of the majority of the Serbian population. Using previously developed and tested astroturfing methods, they bussed many workers into Belgrade from other parts of Serbia for the occasion and also used its grip on state TV to inflate the crowd size. Still, a good portion of the crowd was there on its own volition, especially older individuals and many pensioners that were always Milošević's core support. Instead of Milošević addressing the gathered crowd, the speaking was left to his party's most publicly prominent members and ideologues at the time: Mihailo Marković, Dušan Matković, Živorad Igić, Radoman Božović, Petar Škundrić, etc. The most controversial speech of the day was Matković's, at times referring to protesters as "hooligans" and inciting their own supporters to "do away with them".

=== Up to March 14 ===
The protests persisted and after four days of mostly peaceful demonstration (there were further skirmishes with police on March 11), they achieved their aims: Drašković and Marjanović were freed and Mitević and Bogdanović were replaced.

The demonstrations ended after March 14.

== See also ==
- 1991–1992 anti-war protests in Belgrade
- Anti-bureaucratic revolution
- 1996–1997 protests in Serbia
- Overthrow of Slobodan Milošević
