= Milo Lompar =

Serbian literary historian, professor

- Мило Ломпар
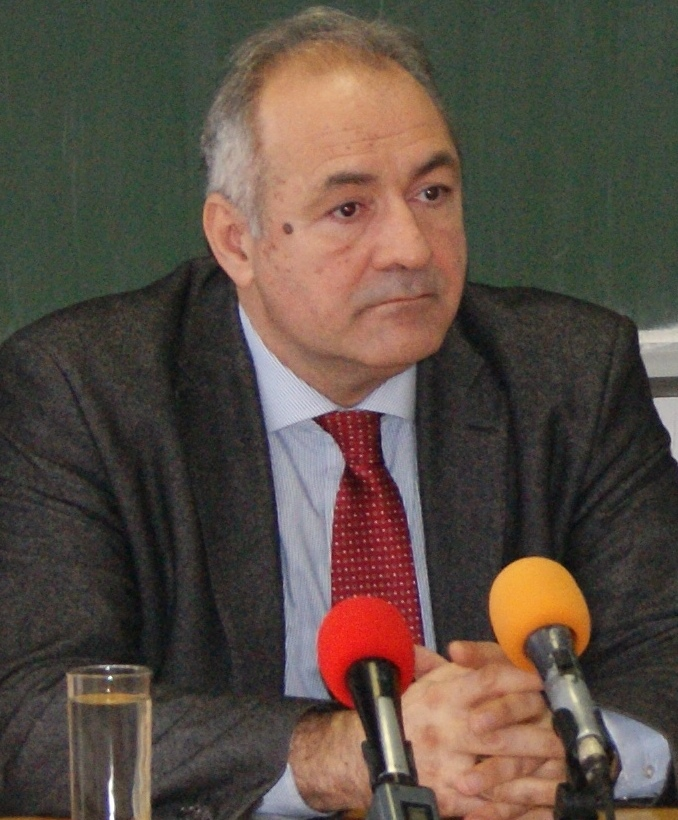
- Lompar in 2018
- Born: 19 April 1962 (age 64); Belgrade, PR Serbia, FPR Yugoslavia
- Education: University of Belgrade
- Occupations: Literary historian, writer
- Spouse: Vesna Lompar
- Children: 1 (Rastko)
- Writing career
- Language: Serbian
- Notable works: Moralistic Fragments; The Spirit of Self-Denial
- Notable awards: October Award of the City of Belgrade (1980); Award / Stražilovo (1983); Stanislav Vinaver Award (1995); Đorđe Jovanović Award (2000); Laza Kostić Award (2004); Nikola Milosevic Award (2009)

Milo Lompar (Serbian Cyrillic: Мило Ломпар; born 19 April 1962) is a Serbian literary historian, professor at the Faculty of Philology, University of Belgrade, writer, president of the Miloš Crnjanski Endowment and former director general of Serbian media corporation Politika.

== Biography ==
Lompar was born in 1962 in Belgrade which at that time was part of Yugoslavia and is of paternal Montenegrin Serb descent. He graduated from the Faculty of Philology in Belgrade (Group for Yugoslav Literature and General Literature). He received his doctorate at the same faculty with a thesis on the historical, poetic and literary heritage of the 18th and 19th centuries in the late works of Miloš Crnjanski before a committee consisting of academician Nikola Milošević, Prof. Dr. Jovan Deretić and Prof. Dr. Novica Petković.

At the Faculty of Philology in Belgrade, he is a professor of Serbian literature of the 18th and 19th centuries, as well as cultural history of the Serbs.

He was the general director of Politika in the period 2005–2006.

In 2018, the Serbian Literary Guild published a book of texts about the painter Petar Lubarda, titled Knjiga o Lubardi. The selection of texts was made by Professor Milo Lompar.

=== Political involvement ===
At the beginning of Serbia’s multi-party system in the 1990s, he was a member of the Serbian Liberal Party, a splitter of the Democratic Party.

As a non-partisan member of the Dveri Political Council, which he joined in 2015 along with Kosta Čavoški, Aleksandar Lipkovski, Vladimir Dimitrijević, Zoran Čvorović and other national conservative oriented intellectuals, he was part of the Dveri and Democratic Party of Serbia political coalition that entered the National Assembly in the 2016 parliamentary elections. He left the Dveri Political Council in January 2018.

Lompar refused to speak at the ceremonial academy marking the 800th anniversary of the autocephaly of the Serbian Orthodox Church, held on October 8, 2019, at the Sava Center in Belgrade, because he opposed the decision of the Holy Synod of Bishops and Patriarch Irinej to award the Order of Saint Sava First Class, the highest honor of the Serbian Orthodox Church, to Aleksandar Vučić.

In April 2022, Lompar signed a petition calling for Serbia not to impose sanctions on Russia after it invaded Ukraine.

He supported the 2024-26 student-led protests and spoke at the Vidovdan protest, held in Belgrade on 28 June 2025. Lompar was one of the candidates dropped from the Student List ahead of the 2026 parliamentary election, at a time when the composition of the list was the subject of widespread public discussion.

==== Views and controversies ====
In June 2025, he participated in the promotion of Radovan Karadžić’s poetry collection Black Fairy Tale (Serbian: Црна бајка, romanized: Crna bajka) at the Serbian Literary Guild, an appearance that drew public criticism due to Karadžić being a convicted war criminal. Lompar later clarified that his participation in the promotion and his signature on a congratulatory telegram to Karadžić were personal decisions, not official acts, and that the poems had been published before the 1990s wars; he described the publication as justified "for democratic reasons" and stated that the event did not have a political character.

In a guest appearance on a Serbian right-wing YouTube podcast named Podcast At Brana's (Serbian: Подкаст Код Бране, romanized: Podkast Kod Brane), which aired on July 17, 2025, Lompar expressed views defending the actions of Milan Nedić and his collaborationist Government of National Salvation during the Axis occupation of Yugoslavia, of which he was the sole prime minister throughout the war. He stated that Nedić was a collaborationist, but not a quisling, and that he was "extorted" to collaborate with the occupier, but denied Nedić deserved judicial rehabilitation. In a later interview with Radio Free Europe, Lompar further added that the opinions he stated were "established historical facts".

== Selected works ==
- Historical, Poetic and Literary Heritage of the 18th and 19th Centuries in the Late Works of Miloš Crnjanski, doctoral dissertation, 1993
- On the End of the Novel (The Meaning of the End of the Novel, Second Book of Migration by Miloš Crnjanski), Rad, Belgrade, 1995; Second, revised edition: Society for Serbian Language and Literature of Serbia, Belgrade, 2008
- Modern Times in the Prose of Dragiša Vasić, Filip Višnjić, Belgrade, 1996
- Njegoš and the Modernity, Filip Višnjić, Belgrade, 1998; Second, corrected edition, Nolit, Belgrade, 2008
- Crnjanski and Mephistopheles (On the Hidden Figure of the Novel about London), Filip Višnjić, Belgrade, 2000; Second, edited edition, Nolit, Belgrade, 2000
- Apollo's Signposts (Essays on Crnjanski), Official Gazette of Serbia and Montenegro, Belgrade, 2004
- Book on Crnjanski, Serbian Literary Association, Belgrade, 2005
- Serbian Literature of the 18th and 19th Centuries, Narodna knjiga, Belgrade, 2006; with co-author Zorica Nestorović
- Moralistic Fragments, Narodna knjiga, Belgrade, 2007; Second, expanded edition, Nolit, Belgrade, 2009
- Somewhere on the Border of Philosophy and Literature (On the Literary Hermeneutics of Nikola Milošević), Službeni glasnik, Belgrade, 2009
- About the Tragic Poet (Njegoš's Songs), Albatros Plus, Belgrade, 2010
- Njegoš's Poetry, Serbian Literary Association, Belgrade, 2010
- The Spirit of Self-Negation: A Contribution to the Critique of Serbian Cultural Policy, Orpheus, Novi Sad, 2011
- Return to the Serbian Standpoint, Catena Mundi, Belgrade, 2013
- Polymathic Studies, Catena Mundi, Belgrade, 2016
- Praise for Modernity, Laguna, Belgrade, 2016
- Freedom and Truth, Catena Mundi, Belgrade, 2018
- Crnjanski: Biography of a Feeling, Poslovna reč NS, Belgrade, 2018
- A Half-Intellectual and National Policy, Catena Mundi, Belgrade, 2021
- Crnjanski and World Literature, Pravoslavna Reč NS, 2021
- Nervous Tale Hour, 2022
- Farewell to an Intellectual, Srpska književna zadruga, 2022
- The Triumph of Colonial Mentality: The False Historiography of Latinka Perović, Catena Mundi, Belgrade, 2022
- The Mannequins of Lies: A Political Essay, 2023
- On the Impostor, 2025
