= Sima Ćirković =

Yugoslav and Serbian historian (1929–2009)

- Born: 29 January 1929; Osijek, Kingdom of Serbs, Croats and Slovenes
- Died: 14 November 2009 (aged 80); Belgrade, Serbia
- Occupation: Historian

Sima Ćirković (Serbian Cyrillic: Сима Ћирковић; 29 January 1929 – 14 November 2009) was a Yugoslav and Serbian historian. Ćirković was a member of the Academy of Sciences and Arts of Bosnia and Herzegovina, the Yugoslav Academy of Sciences and Arts, the Montenegrin Academy of Sciences and Arts, the Serbian Academy of Sciences and Arts and the Vojvodina Academy of Sciences and Arts. His works focused on medieval Serbian history.

== Life and education ==
Sima Ćirković was born on 29 January 1929 in Osijek, Sava Banovina in the Kingdom of Serbs, Croats and Slovenes.

He attended primary school in Sombor and went to secondary school in Belgrade during the Axis occupation of Serbia (1941–1944) in World War II. Afterward, he continued his secondary education in Sombor from 1945 to 1948. He began his studies in history at the Faculty of Philosophy of the University of Belgrade in 1948, graduating in 1952. After a short stint at the State Archives in Zrenjanin and the National Library of Serbia, he was elected as an assistant at the Institute of History in Belgrade in 1955. In 1957, he defended his doctoral dissertation Herceg Stefan Vukčić Kosača i njegovo doba [Herceg Stefan Vukčić Kosača and his era]. He later became an assistant professor at the Faculty of Philosophy in Belgrade, where he taught the History of the peoples of Yugoslavia during the Middle Ages. He became a full professor in 1968, was vice-dean from 1964 to 1966 and dean from 1974 to 1975, and retired in 1994.

== Activism and viewpoints ==
In January 1975, Ćirković resigned from his position as Dean of the Faculty of Philosophy at the University of Belgrade following the planned suspension of the dissident Marxist Humanist Praxis group, all of whom were professors at his faculty.

In 1986 Ćirković criticized the Memorandum of the Serbian Academy of Sciences and Arts, while during the Siege of Dubrovnik in 1991 he and other Yugoslav historians sent an open letter to the Yugoslavian forces asking them to not damage historical district of the city.

Ćirković emphasized that the history of the Serbian people is intricately linked to their migratory movements, which have persisted over time. Of particular importance were the migrations to Hungary during the 15th and 16th centuries, as to the historian, they exposed a significant part of the Serbian population to modern European civilization. For Ćirković, this interaction led to cultural advancement, the establishment of civil society, and bolstered resistance efforts in regions still under Ottoman dominion. Similarly, much like the scientific approach that has dismantled notions of a century-old Slavic presence in Bačka and Banat, he considered that the theory of Kosovo Albanians as autochthonous in the territory of Kosovo to be a myth, one that critical thinking would eventually dismiss.

Ćirković also expressed distinct concerns regarding the currently conflicting relations between Serbs and Albanians. Specifically, he believed that the geographical overlap of these two populations made it absolutely impossible to create a sense of security for each of the two groups through territorial division. Instead, Ćirković supported what he perceived as a pragmatic approach of tolerance. He emphasized the necessity of providing each community with sufficient autonomy concerning education, language usage, and connections with their primary cultural milieu and fellow compatriots. His main concerns were to promote tolerance to enable dialogue as a prerequisite for material and cultural progress for both people.

Ćirković considered that Bosnia and Herzegovina has its historical base and that justification for its existence in modern times was twofold for Ćirković. He argued that Bosnia and Herzegovina have its position as a sovereign state in modern world not only because of its medieval history and specific socio-political development, independent from its neighbors, but also because it should pose as a stable factor in connecting the neighbouring countries that once formed a single state, and it should not be organised as a national state but a nation-state because internal divisions are exclusively based on confessional lines.

According to Ćirković, the controversial SANU Memorandum should be considered to be "a so called Memorandum" because it was never adopted by the Academy and he claims that therefore calling the document to be a "memorandum" is a manipulation.

== Awards ==
- "Oktobarska Award" (1965)
- "Prosveta Award" (1972)
- "Sedmojulska Award" of the Socialist Republic of Serbia for lifetime achievement (1982)
- "Orden rada sa crvenom zastavom" (1988) (Order of labor with a red flag)
- Belgrade Award (2006)
- Konstantin Jirecek" Medal of the German Society for Southeast Europe (2006).

== Legacy ==
In 2006, Croatian historian Ivo Banac mentioned Ćirković as "the most significant living Serbian historian".

Historians John R. Lampe and Constantin Iordachi describe Ćirković as "Serbia's leading medieval historian".

== Works ==
- Ostaci starije društvene strukture u bosanskom feudalnom društvu, Istorijski glasnik 3-4, Belgrade,1958. 155-164. p.
- Srednjovekovna srpska država-izabrani izvori, Školska knjiga, Zagreb, 1959.
- Ćirković, Sima (1959). "Jedan prilog o banu Kulinu". Istorijski časopis. 9–10: 71–77.
- Četvtina, Naučno delo, Belgrade,1963.
- Die bosnische Kirche, Accademia Nazionale dei Lincei, Roma, 1963.
- Ćirković, Sima (1964a). Istorija srednjovekovne bosanske države. Belgrade: Serbian Literary Guild.
- Ćirković, Sima (1964b). "Sugubi venac: Prilog istoriji kraljevstva u Bosni". Zbornik Filozofskog fakulteta u Beogradu. 8 (1): 343–370.
- Ćirković, Sima (2014) [1964]. "The Double Wreath: A Contribution to the History of Kingship in Bosnia". Balcanica (45): 107–143. doi:10.2298/BALC1445107C.
- Ćirković, Sima (1964v). Herceg Stefan Vukčić-Kosača i njegovo doba. Belgrade: Naučno delo.
- Golubac u srednjem veku, Braničevo, Požarevac, 1968.
- Istorija za II razred gimnazije, Zavod za izdavanje udžbenika, Sarajevo,1967, 1969.
- Đurađ Kastriot Skenderbeg i Bosna, Simpozijum o Skenderbegu, Priština, 1969.
- Ćirković, Sima (1970). "Zeta u državi Nemanjića". Istorija Crne Gore (PDF). Vol. 2. Titograd: Redakcija za istoriju Crne Gore. pp. 3–93.
- Ćirković, Sima (1970). "Doba Balšića (prvi deo)". Istorija Crne Gore (PDF). Vol. 2. Titograd: Redakcija za istoriju Crne Gore. pp. 3–48.
- O despotu Vuku Grgureviću, Matica srpska, Novi Sad,1970.
- Zdravstvene prilike u srednjovekovnoj bosanskoj državi, Acta historica medicinae, pharmaciae et veterinae 10/2, Sarajevo,1970. 93-98 p.
- Istorija ljudskog društva i kulture od XII do XVIII za učenike II razreda gimnazije društveno-jezičkog smera, Zavod za izdavanje udžbenika Narodne Republike Srbije, Belgrade,1962,1964,1966,1968,1970,1971. (prevedeno na mađarski, rumunski, bugarski i albanski jezik)
- Srednjovekovna Bosna u delu Ante Babić ,"Babić A., Iz istorije srednjovekovne Bosne", Sarajevo,1972. 5-8. p.
- Odjeci ritersko-dvorjanske kulture u Bosni krajem srednjeg veka,"Srednjovekovna Bosna i evropska kultura", Muzej grada, Zenica,1973. 33-40. p.
- Ćirković, Sima (1974). Despot Georg Branković und die Verhandlungen zwischen Ungarn und der Turken im J. 1454. L'Académie serbe des Sciences et des Arts.
- Ćirković, Sima (1981). "Obrazovanje srpske države". Istorija srpskog naroda. Vol. 1. Belgrade: Serbian Literary Guild. pp. 141–155.
- Ćirković, Sima (1981). "Srbija između Vizantijskog carstva i Bugarske". Istorija srpskog naroda. Vol. 1. Belgrade: Serbian Literary Guild. pp. 156–169.
- Ćirković, Sima (1981). "Osamostaljivanje i uspon dukljanske države". Istorija srpskog naroda. Vol. 1. Belgrade: Serbian Literary Guild. pp. 180–196.
- Ćirković, Sima (1982). "Godine kriza i previranja". Istorija srpskog naroda. Vol. 2. Belgrade: Serbian Literary Guild. pp. 47–63.
- Ćirković, Sima (1982). "Protivrečnosti balkanske politike". Istorija srpskog naroda. Vol. 2. Belgrade: Serbian Literary Guild. pp. 230–240.
- Ćirković, Sima (1982). "Kretanja prema severu". Istorija srpskog naroda. Vol. 2. Belgrade: Serbian Literary Guild. pp. 314–329.
- Ćirković, Sima (1982). "Srpska vlastela u borbi za obnovu Despotovine". Istorija srpskog naroda. Vol. 2. Belgrade: Serbian Literary Guild. pp. 373–389.
- Ćirković, Sima (1982). "Pad Bosne i pokušaji otpora turskom osvajanju". Istorija srpskog naroda. Vol. 2. Belgrade: Serbian Literary Guild. pp. 390–402.
- Ćirković, Sima (1982). "Srpski živalj na novim ognjištima". Istorija srpskog naroda. Vol. 2. Belgrade: Serbian Literary Guild. pp. 431–444.
- Ćirković, Sima (1982). "Poslednji Brankovići". Istorija srpskog naroda. Vol. 2. Belgrade: Serbian Literary Guild. pp. 445–464.
- Ćirković, Sima (1982). "Srbi u odbrani ugarskih granica". Istorija srpskog naroda. Vol. 2. Belgrade: Serbian Literary Guild. pp. 465–478.
- Ćirković, Sima (1982). "Poslednji despoti". Istorija srpskog naroda. Vol. 2. Belgrade: Serbian Literary Guild. pp. 479–490.
- Ćirković, Sima (1991). "Tragovi slovenskog stanovništva na tlu Albanije u srednjem veku". Stanovništvo slovenskog porijekla u Albaniji. Titograd: Istorijski institut. pp. 43–56.
- Ćirković, Sima (1995). Srbi u srednjem veku. Belgrade: Idea.
- Ćirković, Sima; Mihaljčić, Rade, eds. (1997). Enciklopedija srpske istoriografije. Belgrade: Knowledge. ISBN 9788680269351.
- Ćirković, Sima; Mihaljčić, Rade, eds. (1999). Leksikon srpskog srednjeg veka. Belgrade: Knowledge. ISBN 9788683233014.
- Ćirković, Sima (2000). "Archiepiscopus Craynensis". Istorijski Zapisi. 73 (1–2): 47–54.
- Ćirković, Sima (2004). Srbi među evropskim narodima. Belgrade: Equilibrium. ISBN 9788682937043.
- Ćirković, Sima (2004). The Serbs. Malden: Blackwell Publishing. ISBN 9781405142915.

== Sources ==
- Ćirković, Sima (2020). Živeti sa istorijom [Living with history] (PDF) (in Serbian). Belgrade: Helsinški odbor za ljudska prava u Srbiji. ISBN 978-86-7208-217-3.
