= Rakitić =

Rakitić (Serbo-Croatian pronunciation: [rǎkititɕ]) is a Croatian and Serbian surname.

It may refer to:

- Ivan Rakitić (born 1988), Croatian footballer
- Slobodan Rakitić (1940–2013), Serbian writer and politician.
