= Vladimir Đukić =

Serbian politician and academic

- Владимир Ђукић

Member of the National Assembly of the Republic of Serbia
- In office 1 August 2022 – 6 February 2024

Personal details
- Born: 2 March 1957 (age 69) Belgrade, PR Serbia, FPR Yugoslavia
- Party: SPS

Vladimir Đukić (Serbian Cyrillic: Владимир Ђукић; born 2 March 1957) is a Serbian academic, administrator, medical doctor, and politician. He is a longtime member of the Socialist Party of Serbia (SPS) and served in the Serbian national assembly from 2022 to 2024.

== Early life and medical career ==
Đukić was born in Belgrade, in what was then the People's Republic of Serbia in the Federal People's Republic of Yugoslavia. He graduated from the University of Belgrade Faculty of Medicine in 1981, completed postgraduate studies in 1986, and received his doctorate in 1996. He worked for many years at the University Clinical Center of Serbia and was the director of its emergency ward on two occasions, from 1998 to 2000 and again from 2008 to 2012.

Đukić was director of the emergency ward during the 1999 NATO bombing of Yugoslavia and provided frequent media updates about the hospital's challenges during the conflict. When the first NATO bombs struck Belgrade, he noted the building's proximity to potential military targets. "The Serb police headquarters are 100 metres from our urology clinic and the federal police are 200 metres from the maternity bloc," he said. "The interior ministry is 400 metres from here and the army headquarters less than a kilometre. It could be a massacre."

In May 2000, Đukić sued the opposition-run RTV Studio B for reporting that Otpor! activist Radojko Luković had been discharged from the emergency ward "even though he had not undergone the necessary surgery." Đukić described this as an "insolent lie" that harmed "the reputation of physicians and the emergency ward itself." A court found in Đukić's favour, and the station was ordered to pay a fine of 150,000 dinars.

Đukić was a state secretary in Serbia's ministry of health from August 2012 to November 2018, when he became director of the University Hospital Center Dr Dragiša Mišović in Dedinje. The hospital played a leading role in treating COVID-19 patients during the early part of the COVID-19 pandemic in Serbia, a time that Đukić described as the most difficult of his medical career.

He is a full professor at the University of Belgrade Faculty of Medicine and has published widely in his field. In 2019, he became a member of the American College of Surgeons.

In May 2023, Đukić spoke about the medical community's response to the Belgrade school shooting and the Mladenovac and Smederevo shootings.

== Politician ==
=== SPS executive member (2000) ===
Đukić was elected to the executive committee of the Socialist Party in February 2000, when the party dominated Serbian politics. He ran for the Belgrade city assembly in Savski Venac's second constituency seat in the 2000 Serbian local elections later in the year. Savski Venac was an opposition stronghold, and he was defeated by Zoran Šami of the Democratic Opposition of Serbia (DOS) amid a landslide DOS victory.

SPS leader Slobodan Milošević was defeated in the 2000 Yugoslavian presidential election and subsequently fell from power in the 5 October Revolution, a watershed moment in Serbian politics. After Milošević's fall, Đukić withdrew from direct political activity for a number of years.

=== SPS candidate (2016–20) ===
Đukić appeared in the seventy-fourth position on the SPS's electoral list in the 2016 Serbian parliamentary election and the eighty-fourth position in the 2020 parliamentary election. The party's lists won twenty-nine and thirty-two seats, respectively, and he was not elected on either occasion.

He was given the eleventh position on the SPS list in the 2018 Belgrade city assembly election. The list won eight mandates, and he was not elected. He had the opportunity to enter the assembly as the replacement for another party member on 7 June 2018, but he declined.

=== Parliamentarian (2022–24) ===
Đukić was promoted to the sixth position on the SPS's list in the 2022 parliamentary election and was elected when the list won thirty-one seats. The SPS continued its participation in a coalition government led by the Serbian Progressive Party (SNS) after the election, and Đukić supported the administration in the assembly. He was a member of the health and family committee, a deputy member of the education committee, (Note: Formally known as the Committee on Education, Science, Technological Development, and the Information Society.) the leader of Serbia's parliamentary friendship group with Morocco, and a member of the friendship groups with China, Cyprus, the Czech Republic, Egypt, Germany, Iceland, Russia, the United Kingdom, and the United States of America. It was rumoured that he would be appointed as Serbia's health minister in 2022, but this did not happen.

Đukić appeared in the largely ceremonial 110th position (out of 110) on the SPS's list in the 2023 Belgrade city assembly election. Election from this position was a mathematical impossibility, and he was not elected when the list again won eight seats.

He was given the thirty-first position on the SPS's list in the 2023 parliamentary election and was not re-elected when the list fell to eighteen seats. His term ended when the new assembly convened in February 2024. He may have the opportunity to re-enter the assembly as the replacement for another SPS delegate at some time in the current assembly's term.

== Electoral record ==
=== Local (City of Belgrade) ===
2000 Belgrade city election: Savski Venac Division 2
Candidate	Party
Vladimir Đukić	Socialist Party of Serbia–Yugoslav Left–Slobodan Milošević (Affiliation: Socialist Party of Serbia)
Branimir Ivanović	New Communist Party of Yugoslavia
Radivoje Kuzmanović	Serbian People's Radical Party
Ivana Pejović	Serbian Renewal Movement
Vuk Fatić	Serbian Radical Party
Zoran Šami (***WINNER***)	Democratic Opposition of Serbia–Dr. Vojislav Koštunica (affiliation: Democratic Party of Serbia)
Total
