= Serbian Liberal Party =

Defunct liberal–nationalist political party in Serbia (1991–2010)

Serbian Liberal Party Српска либерална странка
- Abbreviation: SLS
- President: Milovan Jeremić
- Founders: Nikola Milošević and Kosta Čavoški
- Founded: 12 January 1991
- Dissolved: 24 January 2010
- Split from: Democratic Party
- Succeeded by: Serbian Liberal Council
- Headquarters: Studentski trg 11, Belgrade
- Newspaper: Liberal
- Ideology: National conservatism; National liberalism; Monarchism; Anti-communism
- Political position: Right-wing

Website
- www.srpskaliberalnastranka.org.rs (archived)

The Serbian Liberal Party (Serbian Cyrillic: Српска либерална странка, romanized: Srpska liberalna stranka; abbr. СЛС or SLS) was a liberal–nationalist and monarchist political party in Serbia active from 1991 to 2010. Founded on 12 January 1991 by Nikola Milošević and Kosta Čavoški after a split from the Democratic Party (DS) over strategy toward the Slobodan Milošević government, anti-communism and the national question, it adopted monarchism in October 1991. It advocated classical liberalism and was generally described as right-wing.

The SLS joined the United Serbian Democratic Opposition (USDO) in 1991 and the Democratic Movement of Serbia (DEPOS) in 1992, boycotted the 1993 and 1997 elections, and won one seat on a Democratic Party of Serbia–led list in 2003. Prominent figures associated with the SLS included academics and intellectuals such as Milošević, Čavoški, film director Aleksandar Petrović and mathematician Milan Božić. The party also drew support from Vasilije Krestić, Smilja Avramov and Milo Lompar.

Outside electoral politics, the SLS campaigned for the rehabilitation of Slobodan Jovanović and Draža Mihailović, and in 2008 initiated an unsuccessful attempt to rehabilitate Milan Nedić. After Nikola Milošević’s death in 2007, leadership passed to Milovan Jeremić. The party dissolved on 24 January 2010, with the Serbian Liberal Council recognized as its legal successor.

== Background ==
The Democratic Party (DS) Initiative Committee announced their intention to constitute themselves as a new political party in late 1989. The party sought to revive the inter-war party of the same name and to present itself as having a 'civic' and 'centrist' identity. However, the DS was characterised by a number of heterogeneous groups and strands of opinion.

An element within the party was opposed in certain respects to the orientation that prominent figures and former Praxis group members Dragoljub Mićunović and Zoran Đinđić advocated. This group included Kosta Čavoški, Nikola Milošević and Vojislav Koštunica. Their analysis stressed a need for the DS to play a stronger anti-communist role.

In the run-up to the 1990 general election, the Associated Opposition of Serbia addressed an open letter to Slobodan Milošević calling for a ninety-day election campaign, two hours of television air time allocated to the opposition, for all parties to have representation in electoral bodies and renewed their appeal for round-table talks. The open letter was presented to a rally of around 40,000 by Čavoški on 12 September. The government responded by granting some concessions to the opposition, including provision for opposition access to the television during the campaign and a reduction in the number of signatures needed for a candidate's nomination. While unhappy, Mićunović and Đinđić championed a resolution passed by the DS Main Committee on 8 October that the DS would participate in the election. Đinđić argued that the opposition could not ignore the opportunity to 'record the illegal actions of the ruling Socialists and inform the public of them'. On 9 October a number of leading figures expressed their dissatisfaction with this resolution and advocated an election boycott, including Čavoški, Milošević, Aleksandar Petrović, Milan Božić and Vladeta Janković.

== History ==
The failure of the Serbian opposition to achieve a breakthrough at the 1990 general election led to a period of introspection and realignment among the opposition parties. The faction of the Democratic Party (DS) that had favoured an election boycott blamed the centrist party leader Dragoljub Mićunović for the catastrophic defeat which they had suffered. In their view, the policy of participation, favoured by Mićunović and Zoran Đinđić, had conferred political legitimacy on the Milošević regime whilst yielding little electoral reward in return. There was a strong correlation between the individuals who supported this position and those who had opposed Mićunović on the national issue during the DS congress of the previous September.

On 12 January 1991, this group, including the academicians Nikola Milošević and Kosta Čavoški, Mićunović's former opponent in the intra-party election, as well as Vladan Vasiljević, director Aleksandar Petrović and mathematician Milan Božić, left the Democratic Party to form the Serbian Liberal Party (SLS). The party was also supported by other prominent academicians such as Vasilije Krestić, Smilja Avramov, Milo Lompar and Žarko Trebješanin.

Having removed themselves from the main body of the DS, and no longer having to accommodate the 'rationalist' beliefs of the Praxis group, the SLS took on an increasingly traditional ideological hue. On 16 October 1991, the SLS formally changed its policy from one of republicanism to monarchism. On 21 October, it played a key role in founding the Movement for the Rebirth of the Constitutional Monarchy. Čavoški stated that the introduction of a constitutional monarchy in Serbia would mark a symbolic yet radical break with the past. While the formation of the SLS was marked by the departure from the DS of some of its founding members and key figures from the 'anti-communist/national' wing of the party, this current continued to be represented by influential individuals such as Vojislav Koštunica and Borislav Pekić and the SLS was not in the long term able to pose a serious challenge to their former party. Zoran Đinđić took over the role of head of the DS Executive Committee which had been vacated by Čavoški.

The SLS joined the Serbian Renewal Movement (SPO) and New Democracy in the short-lived United Serbian Democratic Opposition (USDO) alliance on 22 May 1991. The alliance held a rally on Republic Square on 9 June 1991. Unlike the 9 March demonstration, it was not banned by the authorities and went ahead without violent incident. The rally was condemned by Vojislav Šešelj as an 'act of treason' after which the USDO hit back, labelling his supporters 'Red Četniks' and himself the 'Red Vojvoda' for his perceived close relationship to the socialist Milošević regime. The alliance did not include the Democratic Party which was opposed to it both on organisational and ideological grounds, declaring that the nationalist orientation of the USDO was contrary to its civic ideology. The USDO contested for the seat in Rakovica in late June after the death of SPS member and writer Miodrag Bulatović. Their candidate Jovan Marjanović went up against Borislav Pekić from the DS and Vojislav Šešelj from the SRS, as well as a minor member of the SPS, Radoš Karaklajić. Šešelj was elected and the USDO fragmented and ceased to operate during the summer of 1991.

On 23 May 1992, the SLS joined the Democratic Movement of Serbia (DEPOS) coalition with the SPO, New Democracy and the Serbian Peasants Party. The leadership of the Democratic Party refused to join, stating that parties that made up the DEPOS were 'fixated on popular fronts' and citing their disagreement with the strong monarchist and neo-traditionalist orientation of the coalition. Democratic Party founder and former Praxis intellectual Ljubomir Tadić spoke scornfully of the SPO, as well as "its satellite, the Liberal Party". The right wing of the DS under Vojislav Koštunica would split in late July 1992 to form the Democratic Party of Serbia (DSS), after which the DSS joined DEPOS.

The SLS withdrew from the DEPOS together with the DSS in November 1993, in the run-up to the 1993 election. It announced that it would boycott the elections, which it regarded as an electoral device being used by Slobodan Milošević to consolidate his personal power. However, high-ranking member of the SLS Milan Božić chose to stay with the DEPOS, and would later join the SPO acting as a key advisor to Vuk Drašković.

Under the new leadership of Zoran Đinđić, the DS started to pursue a 'national democratic' course from late 1994 into 1995. Dragoljub Mićunović was expelled on 2 December 1995, and on 3 December it was announced that a new Democratic Alliance (DA) was being formed, a coalition which would unite the DS, DSS, SLS and the Assembly National Party (SNS) of former SPO member Slobodan Rakitić. The coalition broke down in March 1996 when the DS joined the Zajedno coalition with the SPO and Civic Alliance of Serbia (GSS), a move Kosta Čavoški described as "unnatural" and "a betrayal of Serbian national interest".

The SLS boycotted the 1997 election, together with the DS, DSS, GSS and SNS.

In the 2003 parliamentary election the party obtained one seat in the National Assembly, being part of a list headed by the DSS.

Following Nikola Milošević's death in 2007, the party was led by Milovan Jeremić. The Serbian Liberal Party officially ceased to exist on 24 January 2010. Its legal successor is the Serbian Liberal Council (Serbian: Српски либерални савет or Srpski liberalni savet) citizen's group.

In the 2016 election, Aleksandar Nedić, general secretary of the Serbian Liberal Council and grandnephew of Milan Nedić, was part of the DSS-Dveri party list.

== Activities ==
The SLS has played a prominent role in several requests for rehabilitation.

On 3 May 2006 the SLS, along with several other parties including the youth wing of the Democratic Party of Serbia, submitted a request for the rehabilitation of Slobodan Jovanović, Prime Minister of the Yugoslav government-in-exile and president of the conservative Serbian Cultural Club. Jovanović was rehabilitated on 26 October 2007, and his remains were transferred to Serbia and reburied on 10 December 2011.

On 26 February 2009, the Serbian Liberal Party, along with several other political prisoners' associations, initiated the process of rehabilitating Chetnik leader Draža Mihailović. Mihailović was rehabilitated on 14 May 2015.

In 2008, the Serbian Liberal Party initiated the process of rehabilitating Prime Minister of the puppet government in Nazi occupied Serbia, Milan Nedić, in cooperation with Nedić's grandnephew Aleksandar Nedić. Their request was first declined in March 2014. Aleksandar Nedić later became the general secretary of the Serbian Liberal Council, legal successor to the SLS. In 2015, the Serbian Liberal Council, now led by Aleksandar Nedić, repeated the request. The High Court in Belgrade declined the request in July 2018, followed by the Appellate Court in Belgrade in April 2019.

== Publishing work ==
Besides their political work, the Serbian Liberal Party has published several texts of its prominent members, as well as Liberal (The Liberal), a monthly magazine edited by Vladan Banković between 1994 and 1995.

- Nedić, Aleksandar; Jeremić, Milovan, eds. (2005). Da li je bilo sve tako u Srebrenici? (in Serbian). Belgrade: Srpska liberalna stranka. ISBN 86-907073-1-X. (Was It Really so in Srebrenica?)
- Milošević, Pavle (2005). Jugoslovenska vojska u otadžbini 1941-1945 (in Serbian). Belgrade: Srpska liberalna stranka. ISBN 86-907073-2-8. (The Yugoslav Army in the Homeland 1941-1945)
- Đurišić, Predrag; Nedić, Aleksandar; Božić, Vidoje, eds. (2005). Odabrani tekstovi akademika Nikole Miloševića i akademika Koste Čavoškog (in Serbian). Belgrade: Srpska liberalna stranka. ISBN 86-907073-0-1. (Selected Texts of the Academician Nikola Milošević and the Academician Kosta Čavoški)
- Čortanović, Slava; Mavrenović, Slobodan; Nedić, Aleksandar (2006). Drugačija istina (in Serbian). Belgrade: Srpska liberalna stranka. ISBN 86-907073-5-2. (A Different Truth)
- Nikolić, Pavle; Jeremić, Milovan; Nedić, Aleksandar; Mavrenović, Slobodan (2006). Bez kralja ne valja – zašto je Srbiji potrebna monarhija (in Serbian). Belgrade: Srpska liberalna stranka. ISBN 86-907073-4-4. (It's No Good with No King – Why Serbia Needs Its Monarchy)
- Mavrenović, Slobodan, ed. (2006). Slobodan Jovanović - život i delo (in Serbian). Belgrade: Srpska liberalna stranka. ISBN 86-907073-3-6. (Slobodan Jovanović – Life and Works)
- Milošević, Nikola (2007). Zapisi o lažnim demokratama : odabrani ogledi Nikole Miloševića (in Serbian). Belgrade: Srpska liberalna stranka. ISBN 978-86-907073-8-6. (Records of False Democrats – Selected Essays by Nikola Milošević)
- Čavoški, Kosta (2007). Čemu Demokratska stranka (in Serbian). Belgrade: Srpska liberalna stranka. ISBN 978-86-907073-6-2. (Why a Democratic Party?)
- Čavoški, Kosta (2007). Haški minotaur. Tom 1, Hag protiv pravde (in Serbian). Belgrade: Beoknjiga; Euroqwatro; Srpska liberalna stranka. ISBN 978-86-7694-141-4. (The Minotaur from the Hague. Vol. 1, The Hague Against Justice)
- Čavoški, Kosta (2007). Haški minotaur. Tom 2, Hag protiv istine (in Serbian). Belgrade: Beoknjiga; Euroqwatro; Srpska liberalna stranka. ISBN 978-86-7694-142-1. (The Minotaur from the Hague. Vol. 2, The Hague Against Truth)
- Nedić, Aleksandar (2007). Nisu pogazili zakletvu (in Serbian). Belgrade: Euroqwatro; Srpska liberalna stranka; Beoknjiga. ISBN 978-86-7694-145-2. (They Never Violated Their Oath)
- Čavoški, Kosta (2007). Povodi i odjeci : ogledi u "Srpskoj reči", juli 1991 - decembar 1993 (in Serbian). Belgrade: Srpska liberalna stranka. ISBN 978-86-907073-7-9. (Reasons and Echoes – Essays from Srpska Reč, July 1991 - December 1993.)
- Nedić, Aleksandar; Ćirić, Milica; Perić, Danko, eds. (2007). Kako smo rehabilitovali Slobodana Jovanovića (in Serbian). Belgrade: Srpska liberalna stranka. (How We Rehabilitated Slobodan Jovanović)
- Milošević, Nikola (2008). Filozofski ogledi (in Serbian). Belgrade: Srpska liberalna stranka. ISBN 978-86-907073-9-3. (Philosophical Essays)
- Čavoški, Kosta (2008). Kameleon (in Serbian). Belgrade: Srpska liberalna stranka. ISBN 978-86-87603-00-4. (The Chameleon)

== See also ==
- Liberalism in Serbia
- Monarchism in Serbia
- United Opposition of Serbia (1990)
- Democratic Opposition of Serbia
