= Milan Božić (politician) =

Serbian politician (born 1952)

Milan Božić (Serbian Cyrillic: Милан Божић; born 30 March 1952) is an academic, administrator, and politician in Serbia. He was a cabinet minister in the Yugoslavian government in 1999, has served in the assemblies of Yugoslavia and Serbia, and at one time was the acting mayor of Belgrade. He now serves as chair of the supervisory board of Telekom Srbija. A member of the Serbian Renewal Movement (Srpski pokret obnove, SPO) for most of his time as an elected official, Božić is now a member of the Serbian Progressive Party (Srpska napredna stranka, SNS).

== Early life and career ==
Božić was born in Belgrade, in what was then the People's Republic of Serbia in the Federal People's Republic of Yugoslavia. He graduated from the University of Belgrade Faculty of Science and Mathematics in 1975 with a focus on mathematics, received his master's degree in 1978, and earned a Ph.D. in 1983. He became an assistant professor in mathematics in 1984 and was promoted to associate professor in 1991; he also served for a time as dean of the faculty. Božić has published several academic works and has taken part in popular science programming in the Serbian media.

One of his colleagues in the faculty of mathematics was Mirjana Marković, with whom he was on friendly terms. Marković was the wife of Slobodan Milošević and the leader of the Yugoslav Left (Jugoslovenska Levica, JUL) party from 1994 to 2003. Božić's personal association with Marković was a point of controversy during his political career.

== Politician ==
=== Early years ===
Božić joined the Democratic Party (Demokratska stranka, DS) when multi-party politics was re-introduced to Serbia in 1990 and emerged as a prominent figure in the party. In October 1990, he was part of a group of DS activists who opposed the party leadership's decision to participate in the 1990 Serbian parliamentary election, arguing that conditions for fair elections did not exist. On 22 January 1991, Božić and other members of this group left the DS to form the Serbian Liberal Party (Srpska liberalna stranka, SLS).

In 1992, the SLS became part of the Democratic Movement of Serbia (Demokratski pokret Srbije, DEPOS), a broad coalition of parties opposed to the Milošević government. The party left the coalition the following year, when the SLS leadership objected to DEPOS's decision to participate in the 1993 Serbian parliamentary election. Božić, who supported participation, left the SLS and remained within DEPOS as an individual member.

=== Parliamentarian ===
Božić appeared in the sixth position on the DEPOS electoral list for Belgrade in the 1993 Serbian election and was awarded a mandate when the coalition won eleven seats in the capital. (From 1992 to 2000, one-third of Serbia's parliamentary mandates were assigned to candidates from successful lists in numerical order, while the remaining two-thirds were distributed amongst other candidates at the discretion of the sponsoring parties and coalitions. Božić did not automatically receive a mandate by virtue of his list position but was nonetheless included in the DEPOS delegation and took his seat when the assembly met in early 1994.) DEPOS dissolved after the election; Božić joined the SPO, which had been the leading party in the coalition, and became an advisor to its leader Vuk Drašković. The election was won by Milošević's Socialist Party of Serbia (Socijalistička partija Srbije, SPS), and Božić served in opposition.

From 1992 to 2000, the Serbian parliament nominated half the membership (i.e., twenty members) of the Chamber of Republics in the Yugoslavian parliament. By virtue of the coalition's performance in the 1993 election, the parties of DEPOS were allowed to nominate four members to the federal chamber. Božić was selected as a delegate, receiving an appointment in February 1994 for a term that lasted four years. He continued to serve in the Serbian parliament during this time.

In March 1995, he spoke favourably of a recent proposal by the Contact Group as the basis for a negotiated end to the Bosnian War. He also indicated that, in the longer term, he would favour the incorporation of Bosnia and Herzegovina, the Republic of Serbian Krajina, and the Former Yugoslavian Republic of Macedonia into a reconstituted Yugoslavia.

=== 1996 local elections and after ===
The SPO participated in the 1996 Serbian local elections with the DS and the Civic Alliance of Serbia (Građanski savez Srbije, GSS) in a new opposition alliance called Zajedno (English: Together). The alliance won victories in several major cities, including Belgrade, but the results were not initially recognized by the Serbian government. Following an extended standoff and several weeks of protest, the government belatedly recognized the victories of Zajedno in February 1997. DS leader Zoran Đinđić became mayor of Belgrade; Božić, who had been elected to the City Assembly of Belgrade for a division in Vračar, was chosen as deputy mayor as well as being appointed as president of the managing board for Belgrade's television station Studio B. During this time, journalist Seamus Martin described Božić as "the most influential person" in developing the policies of Zajedno.

The Zajedno coalition fell apart at the republic level before 1997 was over. One of the points of controversy was participation in the 1997 Serbian parliamentary election, which the SPO supported and the DS opposed. Božić was re-elected to the Serbian parliament in the 1997 election after appearing in the second position on the SPO's list in Palilula; the party won three seats, and he was again awarded one its optional mandates.

Soon after the 1997 parliamentary election, the Zajedno alliance in the Belgrade assembly completely dissolved. On 30 September 1997, Božić presided over an assembly session that removed Đinđić as mayor via a SPO motion supported by the SPS and the far-right Serbian Radical Party (Srpska radikalna stranka, SRS). The SPO subsequently occupied all of the main positions in the city government. The position of mayor was not initially filled by the assembly; as deputy mayor, Božić served as the city's acting mayor until January 1999.

He suffered injuries while attending a basketball game in November 1997, after he was hit by a tracer rocket fired by someone in the audience. Media reports did not indicate that this was a deliberate attack.

Božić was chosen for a new term in the Yugoslavian Chamber of Republics in 1998.

During the early period of the Kosovo War, Božić stated that "the whole of Serbia [would] be up in arms and react" if ethnic Albanians in Kosovo did not realize that "they live in Serbia, where they can and should exercise all their rights."

=== Yugoslavian cabinet minister and after ===
In January 1999, the SPO joined a coalition government in the Federal Republic of Yugoslavia that was led by the SPS, the JUL, and the Socialist People's Party of Montenegro. Vuk Drašković became a deputy prime minister, and Božić was among the SPO members appointed to the cabinet, serving as a minister without portfolio. A month after his appointment, Božić joined Drašković in representing the SPO in the Rambouillet talks that sought a negotiated end to the Kosovo War.

The Rambouillet talks did not lead to a successful outcome, and the NATO bombing of Yugoslavia began shortly thereafter. As deputy mayor of Belgrade, Božić played a prominent role in attempting to ensure that the city's services remained as functional as possible. In an interview on American television during the bombing, Božić accused NATO of attacking civilian targets and of having created a "humanitarian catastrophe [...] in the very downtown of Belgrade."

The Yugoslavian government announced a unilateral ceasefire in Kosovo on 6 April 1999. In an interview with Romanian television, Božić said that the ceasefire was being offered because the government believed "the terrorists who used the NATO bombings to put pressure on our country are now virtually destroyed." The ceasefire was not accepted by NATO, and the bombings continued. Later in the same month, Božić took part in a Yugoslavian delegation to meetings in Strasbourg with deputies of the Council of Europe Parliamentary Assembly. This was his last major act as a cabinet minister: Drašković was fired from cabinet on 28 April, and the other SPO ministers including Božić announced their resignations on the same day. He continued to serve as deputy mayor of Belgrade and to oversee the city's efforts to maintain its infrastructure during the NATO bombing.

After leaving the Yugoslavian government, the SPO once again positioned itself in opposition to the Milošević administration. In August 1999, Božić announced the SPO's rejection of a SPS offer for a unity government in Serbia. He criticized the Serbian government's decision to shut down several media outlets in May 2000, and the following month he described an "anti-terrorism" law passed by the Yugoslavian government as "clearly a political" act that brought the regime closer to "real dictatorship."

His term in the Chamber of Republics ended in May 2000, when the SPO boycotted a session of the Serbian assembly in which new federal mandates were chosen.

=== 2000 elections ===
Slobodan Milošević was defeated by Vojislav Koštunica of the Democratic Opposition of Serbia, a broad and ideologically diverse coalition of parties that did not include the SPO, in the 2000 Yugoslavian presidential election. This event precipitated major changes in the Serbian and Yugoslavian politics. Božić sought re-election to the Chamber of Republics in the concurrent Yugoslavian assembly election, appearing in the second position on the SPO's list. (This was the first and only time that members of the Chamber of Republics were directly elected.) Half of the mandates in this parliamentary election were awarded to parties on successful lists in numerical order, while the other half were distributed to candidates at the discretion of the sponsoring parties or coalitions. The SPO won only a single mandate for the Chamber of Republics, which automatically went to its lead candidate, the noted architect Spasoje Krunić. The SPO also lost all of its seats in the Belgrade assembly in the concurrent 2000 Serbian local elections; Božić was defeated in his bid for re-election in Vračar's second division. He resigned from the SPO's presidency following the elections. He was not a candidate in the subsequent 2000 Serbian parliamentary election, and his term in the Serbian legislature ended when the new assembly convened in January 2001.

=== Later years ===
Božić was appointed to the management board of Naftna Industrija Srbije in 2002 and served until 2005.

The SPO contested the 2003 Serbian parliamentary election in an alliance with New Serbia, and Božić appeared in the fifteenth position on their combined list. By this time, the entire country had been designated as a single electoral division, and all parliamentary mandates were distributed to candidates on successful lists at the discretion of sponsoring parties or coalitions, irrespective of numerical order. Though the list won twenty-two seats, Božić did not receive a mandate on this occasion. The SPO joined a new coalition government with the Democratic Party of Serbia (Demokratska stranka Srbije, DSS) and other parties after the election; there were rumours that Božić would be appointed as deputy leader of Serbia's Security Intelligence Agency, though ultimately this did not occur. He was, however, appointed to the managing board of Telekom Srbija and served for a time as its chair. In 2005, he indicated that the company would seek to expand its operations by taking over telecommunications companies in the Republika Srpska. He was a member of the Telekom board until 2008 and also served from 2005 to 2009 on a committee for restructuring Serbia's public sector.

He appeared on a combined SPO–New Serbia electoral list for the Vračar municipal assembly in the 2004 Serbian local elections and was given the nineteenth position on SPO's list in the 2007 parliamentary election. In each case, the list failed to cross the relevant electoral threshold to win assembly representation.

Following a 2011 reform, all mandates in Serbian elections were given to candidates on successful lists in numerical order. Božić joined the SNS in 2011 and appeared in the twenty-second position on that party's Let's Get Belgrade Moving list for the Belgrade city assembly in the 2012 local elections. The list won thirty-seven mandates, and he returned to the assembly after a twelve-year absence. The DS and its allies won the election, and Božić served in opposition. He did not seek re-election in the 2014 Belgrade City Assembly election.

He was appointed as president of the supervisory board of Telekom in 2012, a position that he still holds as of 2021. In 2013, he recommended that the service partner with a foreign company as an alternative to privatization.

== Electoral record ==
=== Local (City Assembly of Belgrade) ===
2000 City of Belgrade election Vračar Division II
Prof. Dr. Milan Božić (incumbent)	Serbian Renewal Movement	
Milan Drakluić	Serbian Radical Party	
Dragoljub Janković	Socialist Party of Serbia–Yugoslav Left	
Ljubisav Krunić	New Communist Party of Yugoslavia	
Milena Milošević (incumbent)	Democratic Opposition of Serbia	Elected
