= Milisav Savić =

Serbian writer and novelist

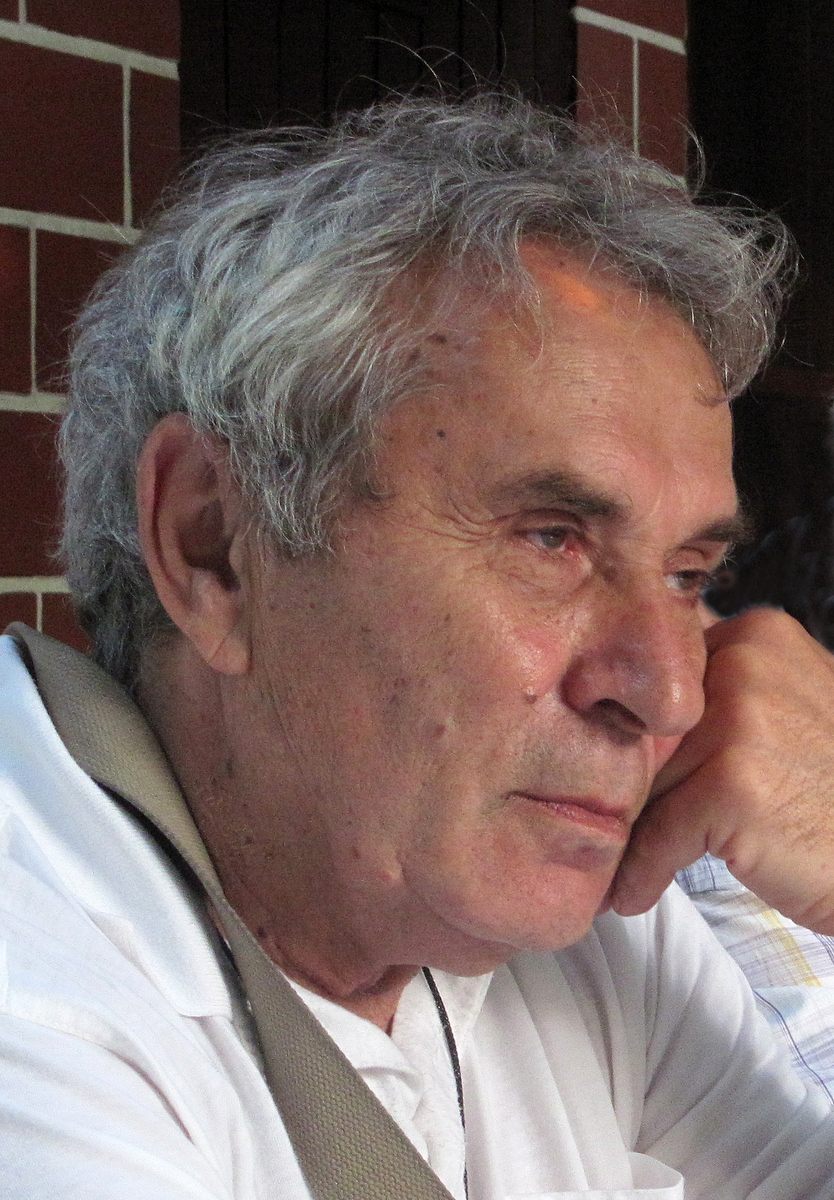
- Savić in 2013
- Born: 15 April 1945 (age 81); Vlasovo, Socialist Federal Republic of Yugoslavia
- Education: University of Belgrade Faculty of Philosophy

Milisav Savić (Serbian Cyrillic: Милисав Савић; born 15 April 1945) is a Serbian writer and novelist.

== Early life ==
He attended elementary school in Raška and high school in Novi Pazar. Later, he graduated from University of Belgrade, where he majored in Yugoslav and world literature in 1969. He attained his M. A. and PhD. from the same university, the latter with the dissertation "Memoir and Autobiographical Prose about Serb-Turkish Wars 1876–78".[1]

== Career ==
Savić was the first editor in chief of the literary periodical "Knjizevna rec" (Literary Word), 1972/1977. In 1980, he was appointed editor-in-chief of the leading literary newspapers "Književne novine" ("Literary Gazette"). In 1983 he became the main editor in the largest publishing house in Serbia, "Prosveta" ("Education"). In 2005/2008 he worked in Rome in The Embassy of Serbia as minister adviser. After his return from Rome, he worked as a professor of literature at the State University of Novi Pazar.

In 1977 and 1978, he taught Serbo-Croatian at London University, later at SUNY, Albany (1985/87), the University of Florence (1990/92 and the University of Lodz, Poland (1999/2000).[2]

Savić is the editor and translator of several anthologies of foreign literature into Serbian (American and Italian) and the writer of three collections of essays.

== Works ==
=== Short-stories collections ===
- "The Bulgarian Shack" (1969)
- "Young Men from Raška" (1977)
- "Uncle about Town" (1977, awarded with the Andrić Prize)
- "30 plus 18" (2005)
- "Love letters and other lessons" (2012)

=== Novels ===
- "The Loves of Andrija Kurandić" (1972)
- "The Poplar on the Terrace" (1985)
- "The Urn of the Guerilla Commander" (1990)
- Bread and Fear" (1991, "NIN award")
- "The Scars of Silence" (1997)
- "The Prince and Serbian Writer", included in the book "Roman Diary, Stories and One Novel" (2008)
- "Cvarcic" (2010), "La sans pareille" (2015 Mesa Selimovic award, 2015 award "Borina nagrada")
- "The valley of Serbian kings" (2015).
