= List of presidents of the Assembly of Serbia and Montenegro =

This article lists the presidents of the Assembly of Serbia and Montenegro.

== List ==
Name (Birth–Death)	Term of office		Party
Dragoljub Mićunović (1930–2026)	3 March 2003	4 March 2004	Democratic Centre
Milorad Drljević (born 1954)^{[a]}	4 March 2004	26 March 2004	Democratic Party of Socialists
Zoran Šami (1948–2016)	26 March 2004	3 June 2006	Democratic Party of Serbia

^{a} Acting President of the Assembly

== See also ==
- Assembly of Serbia and Montenegro
- President of the National Assembly of Serbia
- President of the Parliament of Montenegro

== Sources ==
- Yugoslav ministries, etc – Rulers.org
