= Predrag Palavestra =

Serbian writer and academic

- Born: 14 June 1930; Sarajevo, Drina Banovina, Kingdom of Yugoslavia
- Died: 19 August 2014 (aged 84); Belgrade, Serbia
- Education: University of Belgrade Faculty of Philology

Predrag Palavestra (Serbian Cyrillic: Предраг Палавестра; 14 June 1930 – 19 August 2014) was an author, literary historian and academic. He was a member of the Serbian Academy of Sciences and Arts and the Academy of Sciences and Arts of Bosnia and Herzegovina.

== Biography ==
Palavestra was born in Sarajevo in 1930. He graduated from the University of Belgrade Faculty of Philology, where he received his doctorate in 1964. As a literary critic, he wrote for the newspaper Politika and was the editor of the newspaper Književne novine and the magazine Savremenik. He worked as the director of the Institute for Literature and Art in Belgrade. He was twice elected president of the International PEN Centre of Serbia. He was a member of the Privy Council and the Board of Directors of the Fund of the Royal House of Karađorđević.

He was admitted to the membership of the Serbian Academy of Sciences and Arts on 7 May 1981, when he was elected as a corresponding member. He was elected as a regular member on 15 December 1988. He was first elected to the position of Secretary of the Language and Literature Department of the Serbian Academy of Sciences and Arts on 26 April 1994, and re-elected on 28 May 1998 and 23 April 2002.

His book Posleratna srpska književnost 1945—1970 (Post-war Serbian literature 1945–1970) was tacitly banned and part of its circulation was set on fire.

Palavestra died in Belgrade on 19 August 2014, at the age of 84.

== Works ==
- Književne teme (1958)
- Književnost Mlade Bosne (1965)
- Tokovi tradicije (1971)
- Posleratna srpska književnost 1945—1970 (1972)
- Dogma i utopija Dimitrija Mitrinovića: počeci srpske književne avangarde (1977)
- Kritika i avangarda u modernoj srpskoj književnosti (1979)
- Skriveni pesnik: Ivo Andrić (1981)
- Kritička književnost (1983)
- Nasleđe srpskog modernizma (1985)
- Istorija moderne srpske književnosti — zlatno doba 1892–1918. (1986)
- Književnost kao kritika ideologije (1991)
- Knjiga o Andriću (1992)
- Književnost i javna reč (1994)
- Kritičke rasprave (1995)
- Jevrejski pisci u srpskoj književnosti (1998)
- Istorija srpskog PEN-a (2006)

Editor

- Twenty five books in the series titled Serbian literary criticism, Matica Srpska
- Knjiga srpske fantastike XII—XX veka, Serbian Literary Guild (1989)
- Srpski simbolizam, Serbian Academy of Sciences and Arts (1983)
- Srpska fantastika, SANU (1987)
- Tradicija i moderno društvo, SANU (1987)
- Odgovornost nauke i inteligencije, SANU (1990)
- Srpska književnost u emigraciji, SANU (1991)
- O Jovanu Dučiću — povodom pedesetogodišnjice smrti, SANU (1996)
