= Milena Milošević =

Serbian politician

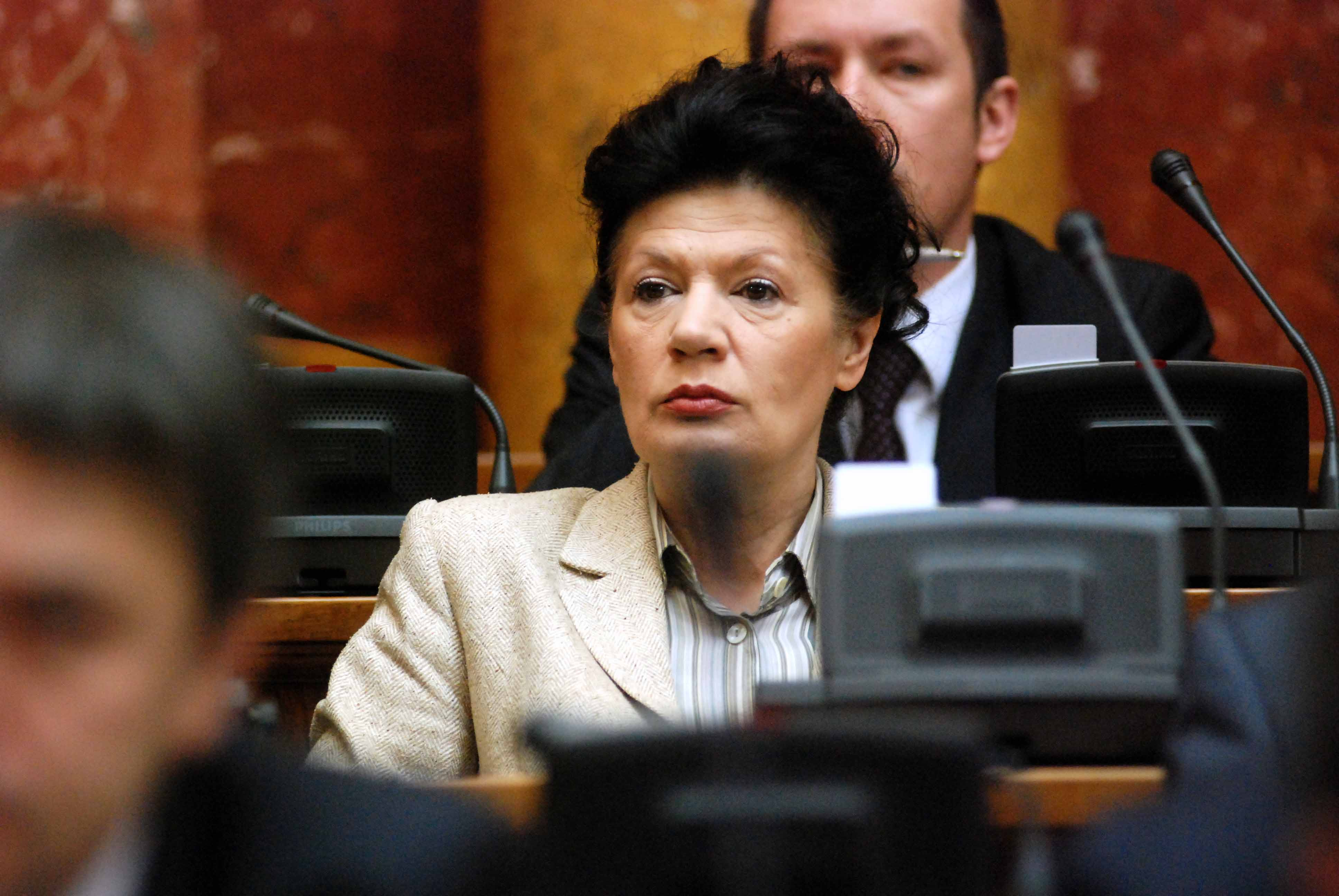
Milena Milošević in 2009.

Milena Milošević (Serbian Cyrillic: Милена Милошевић; 19 June 1950 – 2016) was a politician in Serbia. She served in the National Assembly of Serbia for most of the period from 2001 to 2012 and was mayor of the Belgrade municipality of Vračar from 1997 to 2006. Milošević was a member of the Democratic Party (Demokratska stranka, DS).

== Early life and career ==
Milošević was born in Belgrade, in what was then the People's Republic of Serbia in the Federal People's Republic of Yugoslavia. She graduated from the University of Belgrade Faculty of Law and worked for sixteen years as a lawyer, specializing in the legal control of loans and the insurance of property and persons.

== Politician ==
Milošević became active with the Democratic Party in 1992 and was an opponent of Slobodan Milošević's administration during the 1990s.

=== City of Belgrade ===
Milošević served in the Vračar municipal assembly in the 1992–96 term and was the vice-president of the assembly from 1994 to 1996.

The DS contested the 1996 Serbian local elections in an alliance with the Serbian Renewal Movement (Srpski pokret obnove, SPO) and other parties, collectively known as Zajedno (Together). Although the alliance won the elections overall in Belgrade and several other cities, the Serbian authorities initially refused to recognize the results, leading to an extended period of protests throughout the country. The government ultimately almost all of the victories of Zajedno in early 1997. Milošević was re-elected to the Vračar assembly and was chosen as the assembly's president, which at the time was equivalent to mayor. She was also elected to the City Assembly of Belgrade for a Vračar division. Zajedno fell apart later in the year, and SPO created an informal alliance in Belgrade with Slobodan Milošević's Socialist Party of Serbia, leaving the DS out of the city administration.

The DS subsequently helped to form the Democratic Opposition of Serbia (DOS), a broad and ideologically diverse coalition of parties opposed to Slobodan Milošević's administration; DOS candidate Vojislav Koštunica defeated Slobodan Milošević in the 2000 Yugoslavian general election, a watershed event in the politics of Serbia and Yugoslavia. Milena Milošević was re-elected to the Belgrade assembly for Vračar's second division in the concurrent 2000 Serbian local elections, in which the DOS won a landslide victory in Belgrade with 105 out of 110 seats. She also led the DOS to an absolute victory in Vračar – taking all sixty seats in the assembly – and was confirmed as mayor for a second term.

Serbia subsequently switched to a system of proportional representation for local elections and separated the positions of mayor and assembly president. Milošević was given the sixth position on the DS's electoral list in the 2004 Serbian local elections and was re-elected when the list won a plurality victory with thirty-four out of ninety mandates. She was not a candidate for re-election in 2008. She also led the DS to victory in Vračar and continued as mayor for a third term. She stood down from the role in 2006.

=== Member of the National Assembly ===
Milena Milošević received the 151st position on the DOS's electoral list in the 2000 Serbian parliamentary election, which was held shortly after the fall of Slobodan Milošević's administration. The DOS won a landslide victory with 176 out of 250 seats, and Milena Milošević was awarded a mandate as a DS representative when the assembly convened in early 2001. (From 2000 to 2011, mandates in Serbian parliamentary elections were awarded to sponsoring parties or coalitions rather than individual candidates, and it was common practice for the mandates to be assigned out of numerical order. Milošević's specific position on the list had no formal bearing on whether she received a mandate.)

The DS fielded its own list in the 2003 parliamentary election, and Milošević was included in the 159th position. The list won thirty-seven mandates. Milošević was not initially included in her party's delegation, but she received a new mandate on 17 February 2004 as the replacement for another party member. In the sitting of the assembly that followed, the DS served in opposition.

Milošević was again included on the DS list in the 2007 parliamentary election and was selected for a third term when this list won sixty-four mandates. Following the election, the DS formed an unstable coalition government with the rival Democratic Party of Serbia (Demokratska stranka Srbije, DSS), and Milošević served as a supporter of the administration.

The DS–DSS coalition fell apart in early 2008, and a new election was held in May of that year. The DS contested the election at the head of the For a European Serbia coalition; Milošević appeared in the 135th position on the list and was selected for a fourth mandate when the list won 102 out of 250 seats. Although the results of the parliamentary election were initially inconclusive, For a European Serbia ultimately formed a new governing alliance with the Socialist Party of Serbia and other parties, and Milošević once again served as a government supporter. She was not a candidate for re-election in 2012.

== Death ==
The DS announced on 1 October 2016 that Milošević had died. Her funeral took place two days later.

== Electoral record ==
=== Local (City Assembly of Belgrade) ===
2000 City of Belgrade election Vračar Division II
Prof. Dr. Milan Božić (incumbent)	Serbian Renewal Movement	
Milan Drakluić	Serbian Radical Party	
Dragoljub Janković	Socialist Party of Serbia–Yugoslav Left	
Ljubisav Krunić	New Communist Party of Yugoslavia	
Milena Milošević (incumbent)	Democratic Opposition of Serbia	Elected
