= Serbian Literary Guild =

Serbia's oldest writers' organization

- Српска књижевна задруга
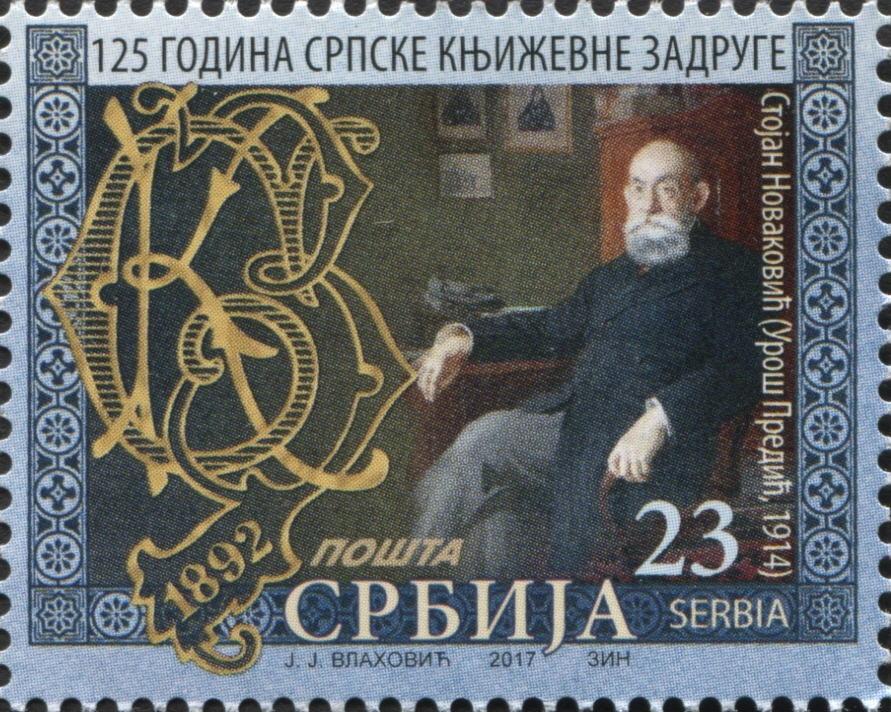
- 2017 Serbian post stamp celebrating 125th anniversary
- Founded: 29 April 1892; 134 years ago
- Headquarters: Kralja Milana 19, Belgrade
- Location: Serbia
- Key people: Milovan Danojlić
- Website: srpskaknjizevnazadruga.com

The Serbian Literary Guild (Serbian: Српска књижевна задруга, romanized: Srpska književna zadruga, SKZ) is Serbia's oldest writers' association and the second-oldest publishing house after Matica srpska.

== History ==
It was founded in Belgrade on 29 April 1892 in the no longer existing building of the Royal Serbian Academy of Sciences and Arts by sixteen prominent people of the cultural, scientific and political life of that time. Since its inception, the traditional institution has edited works by both Serbian and international authors and finally contributed to promotion and dissemination of Serbian and other translated world's literature. The traditional corporation has thus made an important contribution to the Serbian cultural life for more than a century. The cooperative's coat of arms was designed by Jovan Jovanović Zmaj.

During the Kingdom of Serbia the Guild had 11,000 members in Serbia and the Balkans and operated as a major publishing house, but its actual role was that of an educational institution that carefully fostered national culture and ideas of South-Slavic unity as well. The Guild translated numerous Greek and Roman classics as well as French literature of the time. Their works were smuggled in Slavic provinces under Austrian rule, as the Austrian authorities considered the works to be liberally and nationally charged.

Among the numerous publications of the Literary Cooperative can be found many translated works of international writers such as Jorge Amado, Ludovico Ariosto, Honoré de Balzac, Charles Baudelaire, Beaumarchais, Lord Byron, Luís Vaz de Camões, Albert Camus, Geoffrey Chaucer, Paul Claudel, James Fenimore Cooper, Alphonse Daudet, Charles Dickens, Charles Diehl, Maurice Druon, George Eliot, Thomas Stearns Eliot, Euripides, Richard J. Evans, William Faulkner, Gustave Flaubert, Benjamin Franklin, Oliver Goldsmith, Johann Wolfgang von Goethe, Peter Handke, Thomas Hardy, Ludwik Hirszfeld, Victor Hugo, Aldous Huxley, Henry James, Franz Kafka, Søren Kierkegaard, Rudyard Kipling, David Lodge, Thomas Babington Macaulay, André Malraux, Christopher Marlowe, Herman Melville, Prosper Mérimée, Molière, Eugene O’Neill, Joyce Carol Oates, Edgar Allan Poe, France Prešeren, Francisco de Quevedo, Rainer Maria Rilke, Isak Samokovlija, Friedrich von Schiller, Arthur Schnitzler, Albert Schweitzer, Walter Scott, William Shakespeare, Henryk Sienkiewicz, Aleksandr Solzhenitsyn, Stendhal, Hippolyte Taine, Henry David Thoreau, Leo Tolstoy, François Villon, Virgil, Oscar Wilde and Thomas Wolfe.

== Presidents ==
- Stojan Novaković, 1892—1895
- Ljubomir Kovačević, 1895—1898
- Pera Đorđević, 1898—1902
- Ljubomir Stojanović, 1902—1904
- Ljubomir Jovanović, 1904—1906
- Dobroslav Ružić, 1906—1908
- Stojan Novaković, 1908—1915
- Sreta Stojković, 1920—1928
- Pavle Popović, 1928—1937
- Marko Car, 1937—1941
- Tihomir Đorđević, 1941—1942
- Veljko Petrović, 1945—1952
- Miloš N. Đurić, 1952—1957
- Vojislav Đurić, 1957—1961
- Milan Đoković, 1961—1962
- Svetislav Đurić, 1962—1966
- Milan Đoković, 1966—1969
- Dobrica Ćosić, 1969—1972
- Risto Tošović, 1973—1986
- Radovan Samardžić, 1988—1994
- Branko V. Radičević, 1995—1997
- Novica Petković, 1997—1999
- Milisav Savić, 2000—2001
- Slavenko Terzić, 2001—2005
- Slobodan Rakitić, 2005—2013
- Milovan Danojlić, 2013–
