= Zoran Šami =

- Зоран Шами
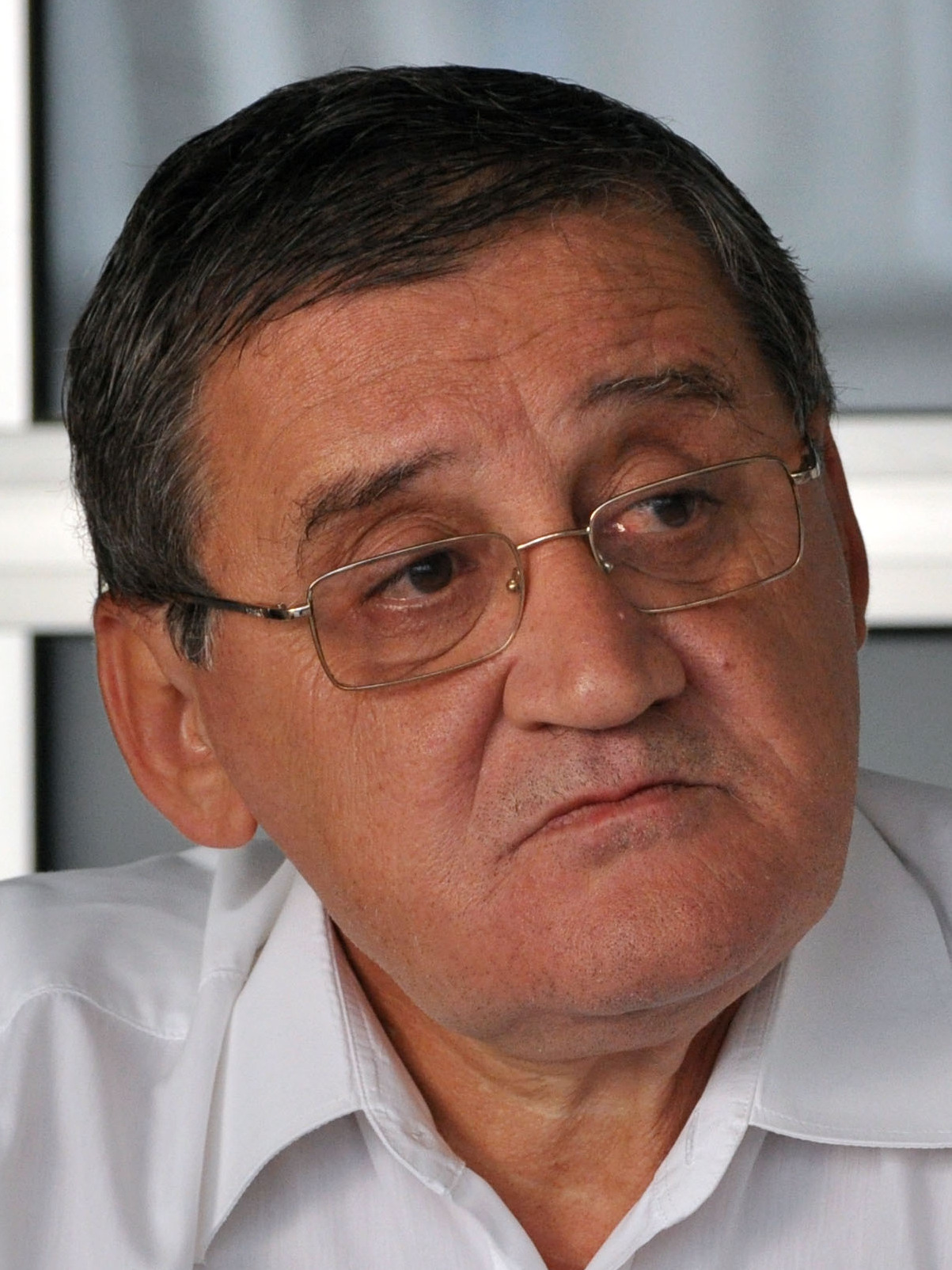
- Šami in 2007

President of the Assembly of Serbia and Montenegro
- In office March 26, 2004 – June 3, 2006
- Preceded by: Dragoljub Mićunović
- Succeeded by: Predrag Marković (President of the National Assembly of Serbia); Ranko Krivokapić (President of the Parliament of Montenegro)

Personal details
- Born: 2 November 1948 Valjevo, Yugoslavia
- Died: 4 September 2016 (aged 67) Serbia
- Party: Democratic Party of Serbia

Zoran Šami (Serbian Cyrillic: Зоран Шами; 2 November 1948 – 4 September 2016) was the speaker of the Parliament of Serbia and Montenegro from Democratic Party of Serbia.

Šami was born on 2 November 1948 in Valjevo. He graduated from the Faculty of Natural Sciences and Mathematics at Belgrade University, where he obtained his PhD in mathematics also. Since 1971 he has been working at the Faculty of Transport and Traffic Engineering in Belgrade as an associate professor.

He was a member of the Democratic Party 1990–1992 and, as one of founders of the Democratic Party of Serbia, he was vice-president twice: 1993–1996 and 2000–2003.

From October 2000 until July 2001 he was the Minister of Transportation in the Government of FR Yugoslavia. In 2000 he became an MP in the Federal Parliament, and in 2003 he became an MP in the Parliament of the State Union of Serbia and Montenegro. He was the Speaker of the State Union during its existence from 2003 to the dissolution of 2006.

With the 21 January 2007 Serbian parliamentary election, he was elected as a deputy of the Democratic Party of Serbia in Vojislav Koštunica's coalition of the Democratic Party of Serbia and New Serbia. His mandate was affirmed on 14 February 2007.

On 10 May 2007 he was elected president of the Board for Education.

Šami has published 12 textbooks and numerous scientific and expert studies.

Šami died on 4 September 2016 at the age of 67.
