= Borislav Mihajlović Mihiz =

Serbian writer

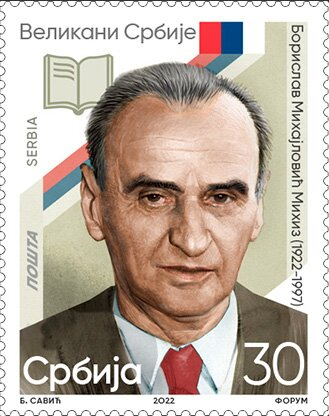
- Mihiz on a 2022 stamp of Serbia
- Born: 17 October 1922; Irig, Kingdom of Serbs, Croats and Slovenes
- Died: 15 December 1997 (aged 75); Belgrade, FR Yugoslavia
- Education: University of Belgrade Faculty of Philosophy
- Occupations: Writer, literary critic

Borislav "Mihiz" Mihajlović (Serbian Cyrillic: Борислав Михајловић Михиз; 17 October 1922 – 15 December 1997) was a Serbian writer and literary critic.

He was one of the leaders of the Committee for the Protection of Artistic Freedom.

A street in Dorćol is named after him.

== Selected works ==
- Pesme, 1947
- Ogledi, 1951
- Od istog čitaoca, 1956
- Srpski pesnici između dva rata, 1956
- Književni razgovori, 1971
- Izdajnici, 1986
- Portreti, 1988
- Autobiografija o drugima, 1990
- Autobiografija o drugima – druga knjiga, 1993
- Banović Strahinja, drama
- Komanant Sajler, drama
- Kraljević Marko, drama
- Optuženi Pera Todorović, drama

Screenplays

- Korespondencija
- Dorotej
- Ranjeni orao
- Derviš i smrt
- Silom otac
- Roj
- Orlovi rano lete
- Put oko sveta
- Dve noći u jednom danu
- Branko Radičević
