= Slobodan Rakitić =

Serbian writer and politician (1940–2013)

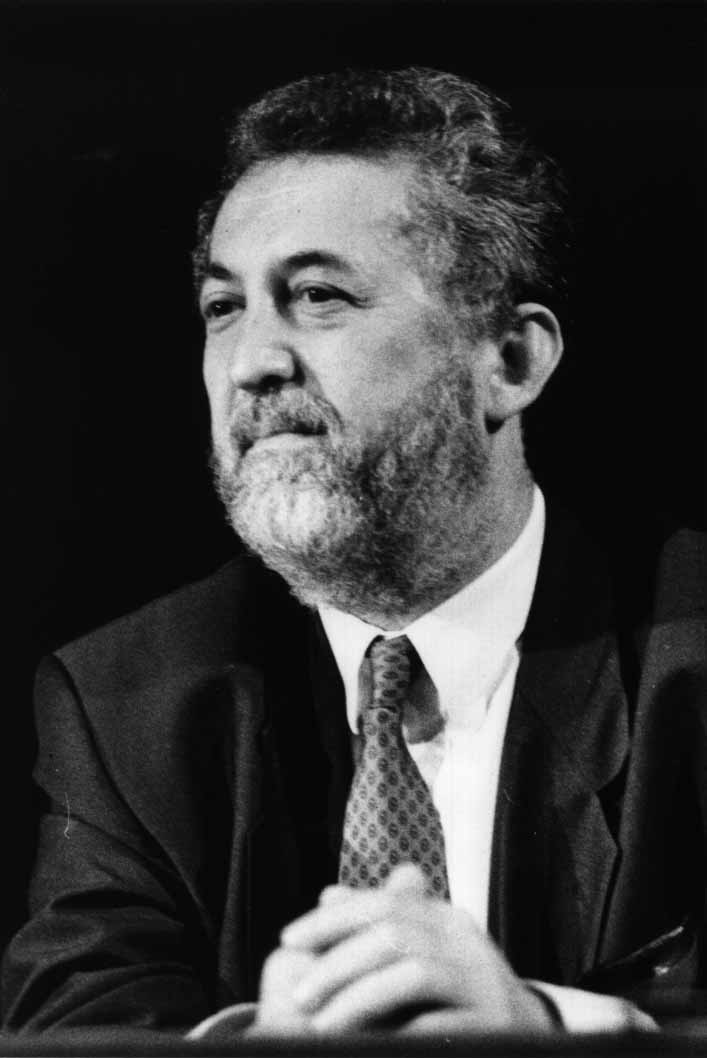
- Born: 30 September 1940; Raška, Kingdom of Yugoslavia
- Died: 1 January 2013 (aged 72); Belgrade, Serbia
- Resting place: Belgrade New Cemetery
- Education: University of Belgrade
- Occupations: Writer and politician
- Writing career
- Language: Serbian

Slobodan Rakitić (Serbian Cyrillic: Слободан Ракитић; 30 September 1940 – 1 January 2013) was a Serbian writer and politician.

== Biography ==
Rakitić was born in Vlasovo, Raška, Serbia. He attended the elementary school in Raška and the high school in Novi Pazar. First he studied at the Belgrade Medical School, but then changed to the University of Belgrade Faculty of Philology, where he graduated.

He was the editor of literary magazines such as Contemporary (Savremenik) and Raška. He was a member of the first editorial staff who initiated the appearance of Literary Word (Književna reč) in 1972. As the editor in charge of literature and language, he has been working at the Ilija M. Kolarac Foundation ever since 1973.

Rakitić wrote and had the following books of poetry published: Lights of Writings (1967), Raska Tunes (1968), The world is not our home (1970), Earth on the Tongue (1973), Poems of Tree and Fruit (1978), Craving for the South (1981), A Descendant (1982), Basic Land (1988), Deeds on Fire (1990), A Soul and a Sandbar (1994); his published books and essays are: From Ithaca to Illusion (1985), Forms and Meanings (1994); an anthology: Yugoslav Peoples' Poetry of Romanticism (1978); Selected Works in five volumes, Selected and New Poems (1998), Letters Made of Water (2000).

The poet received the following literary awards: "Milan Rakić" (1974), "Isidora Sekulić" (1982), "Branko Miljković" (1989), "Laza Kostić" (1995), "Kočić's pen" (1997), "Jovan Dučić" (1998), "Gold Link" (1998) and "Prince Lazar's Gold Cross" (1998). The book of poetry Deeds on Fire was awarded "The October Belgrade Prize" in 1990 and "Rade Drainac" award in 1991. His poems have been translated into a large number of foreign languages.

Rakitic was a meditative lyric poet with a distinct feeling for history, culture and traditional values. His lyrically-intimist, elegiac, reflexive and religious poetry tries to offer answers to eternal issues of life and death, to the position of an individual and historic, collective sufferings. Rakitić's poetic discourse is outstandingly metaphysical, noble and dominantly neosymbolistic. Thematically, by forms and motives found in them, his poems correspond to the old religious service literature.

Under the communist regime, Slobodan Rakitić played an active role as a writer struggling for human rights and democratic freedoms. He was never a partisan of the Communist Party of Yugoslavia. In 1990, he took part in founding the "Serbian Renewal Movement" (SPO), the largest opposition party at that time, led by Vuk Drašković. He was the President of Serbian Renewal Movement parliamentary fraction in the Serbian Parliament during the first pluralist National Assembly (1991–1992), also the leader of the parliamentary fraction (1993–1994) of DEPOS - "Democratic Movement of Serbia" (a large union of major opposition parties and numerous individuals not belonging to any of the political parties). In 1995, he founded a breakaway group called the Parliamentary People's Party (SNS; also known in English as the Assembly National Party).

Rakitić was the president of the Association of Writers of Serbia from 1994 until 2005.

In 2013 he was posthumously awarded the literature award "Jelena Balšić", established by the 'Metropolitanate of Montenegro and the Littoral', and is awarded every two years.
