= Vlasovo =

Vlasovo Власово (Serbian)
- Village
- Location within Serbia
- Coordinates: 43°01′42″N 21°28′12″E
- Country: Serbia
- District: Toplica District
- Municipality: Prokuplje

Population (2022)
  - Total: 17
- Time zone: UTC+1 (CET)
  - Summer (DST): UTC+2 (CEST)

Vlasovo is a village in the municipality of Prokuplje, Serbia. According to the 2022 census, the village has a population of 17 people.
