= Kosta Čavoški =

Serbian politician (born 1941)

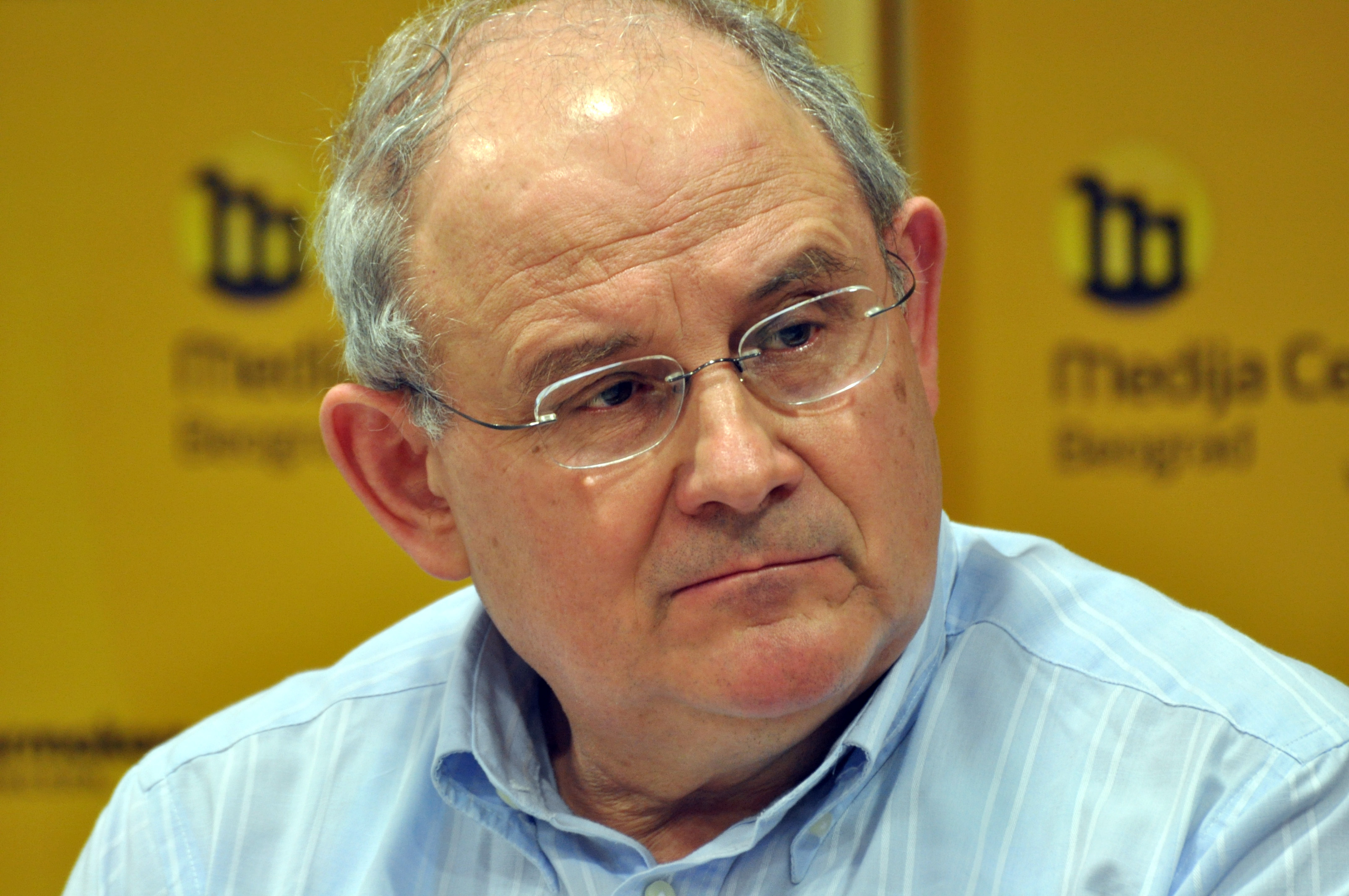
- Kosta Čavoški
- Born: 26 October 1941 (age 84); Banatsko Novo Selo, German-occupied Banat
- Occupation: professor at University of Belgrade's Law School
- Political party: DS (1990); SLS (1991–2007); Dveri (2016–2018)

Kosta Čavoški (Serbian Cyrillic: Коста Чавошки; born 26 October 1941) is a Serbian politician and a retired professor at the University of Belgrade's Law School. He is an outspoken critic of the International Criminal Tribunal for the former Yugoslavia.

== Biography ==
He was one of the thirteen initiators of the re-establishment of the Democratic Party in Serbia on 11 December 1989. He was one of the leading members of the Founding Committee of the Democratic Party who drafted the first party political program of the Democratic Party published as the Letter of Intent (Pismo o namerama) on 18 January 1990. However, within a year he left the Democratic Party along with Professor Nikola Milošević and others to found his own political entity, the Serbian Liberal Party.

Kosta Čavoški had been a dissident since the 1970s when as an assistant law professor at University of Belgrade in 1973 he published an article critical of the communist system entitled "Which values are protected by our laws?". He was sentenced to a term of imprisonment and thrown out of the Law School. In 1990 he was readmitted to the Law School as a full-time professor.

At the beginning of 1996 the President of Bosnia's Republika Srpska Radovan Karadžić appointed him a Senator of the entity.

In June 2008 he was declared persona non grata by Bosnia-Herzegovina because of his connections, and he was banned from entering the country again.

== Works ==
- Filozofija otvorenog društva: Politički liberalizam Karla Popera (1975)
- Mogućnosti slobode u demokratiji (1981)
- Ustavnost i federalizam: Sudska kontrola ustavnosti u anglo-saksonskim federacijama (1982)
- Stranački pluralizam ili monizam (1983), with Vojislav Koštunica
- O neprijatelju (1989)
- Revolucionarni makijavelizam (1989)
- Tito – tehnologija vlasti (1991)
- Slobodan protiv slobode (1991)
- Pravo kao umeće slobode. Ogled o vladavini prava (1994)
- Uvod u pravo I. Osnovni pojmovi i državni oblici (1994)
- Na rubovima srpstva (1995)
- Ustav kao jemstvo slobode (1996)
- Uvod u pravo II (1996), with Radmila Vasić
- Zatiranje srpstva (1996)
- Lutka u tuđim rukama (1998)
- Hag protiv pravde (1998)
- Od protektorata do okupacije (1998)
- Apsolutna i ublažena pravda u Eshilovoj Orestiji (2001), with Mirjana Stefanovski
- Zgaženi ustav (2003)
- Okupacija (2006)
- Makijaveli (2008)
- Pod tronom Atlantskog pakta: Evropski sud za ljudska prava (2009)
- Izdaja (2009)
- Odbor za odbranu slobode misli i izražavanja (2010)
- Rasrbljavanje (2011)
- Ustav kao sredstvo agitacije i propagande (2011)
- Srpsko pitanje (2011)
- Anatomija jedne čistke (2013)
- Zloupotreba istorije u Hagu (2013)
- Veleizdaja (2014)
- Da li sudije štite izdaju? (2014)
- Moć i prevlast (2015)
- Nikola Milošević (2015)
- Veleizdaja u višestrukom povratu (2016)
- Kosovo stožer srpstva (2018)
- Sećanja neuspešnog političara I-III (2022)
