= Nikola Milošević (politician) =

Serbian politician and writer

- Born: 17 April 1929; Sarajevo, Kingdom of Serbs, Croats, and Slovenes
- Died: 24 January 2007 (aged 77); Belgrade, Serbia
- Occupations: Philosopher, literary critic, writer, politician, professor
- Political party: Serbian Liberal Party
- Children: 1

Nikola Milošević, PhD (Serbian Cyrillic: Никола Милошевић; 17 April 1929 – 24 January 2007) was a Serbian writer, political philosopher, literary critic, and politician.

He graduated from the University of Belgrade Faculty of Philosophy. He was professor of Literary Theory at the University of Belgrade Faculty of Philology since 1969. He became a correspondent member of the Serbian Academy of Sciences and Arts in 1983 and a full member in 1994. He was president of the Miloš Crnjanski Endowment in Belgrade.

== Political and intellectual activity ==
In 1968 during a big student revolt in the streets of Belgrade, he daily criticized official press coverage of the protests in front of hundreds of protesting students. He was a leading anti-Marxist intellectual in Serbia during the 1970s and 1980s. In the 1970s he criticized severely Vladimir Lenin's involvement in pre-revolutionary robberies and this had powerful echo and undermined pro-Marxist intelligentsia in Yugoslavia that supported the government of Josip Broz Tito. In his 1985 book Marxism and Jesuitism he severely criticized Lenin and Joseph Stalin, which prompted Soviet officials to unsuccessfully demand his removal from the University of Belgrade. He continued his anti-communist involvement during the rule of Slobodan Milošević (1990–2000) and was eventually banned from entering the Faculty of Philology building in 1998 by a government-appointed dean.

Nikola Milošević's lectures at the Faculty of Philology were attended by the who is who of intellectual Belgrade and his polemics with Marxist authors attracted considerable attention. In 1982, he declined to accept the highest communist award of the City of Belgrade for scholars and artists – the October Prize.

In political sphere he was a conservative liberal. He was one of the founders of the re-established Democratic Party in Serbia in 1990. After quarrels with party's leader prof. Dragoljub Mićunović, Nikola Milošević, together with a group of ten prominent members of the Democratic Party, established a new party – the Serbian Liberal Party. This party advocated liberal and anti-communist ideas and boycotted all elections during the reign of Slobodan Milošević (1990–2000). In 2003 Nikola Milošević became a member of the Serbian Parliament since the Serbian Liberal Party participated in December 2003 elections as a coalition partner of the Democratic Party of Serbia.

His last publication was a collection of political polemics entitled Politički spomenar: Od Broza do DOS-a [Political Recollection: From Broz to DOS].

== Philosophical orientation ==
He was dedicated to philosophical anthropology and the problems of human nature. He attempted to establish a new subdivision of philosophical anthropology which he named psychology of knowledge and elaborated in detail on this discipline in his books Psychology of Knowledge and Philosophy and Psychology. Overall he was an anthropological pessimist.

== Works ==
He published the following books in Serbian:

- Antropološki eseji [Anthropological Essays, 1964],
- Negativni junak [Negative Hero, 1965],
- Roman Miloša Crnjanskog [Novels of Miloš Crnjanski, 1970],
- Ideologija, psihologija i stvaralaštvo [Ideology, Psychology and Creativity 1972],
- Andrić i Kreleža kao antipodi [Andrić and Krleža as Antipodes, 1977],
- Šta Lukač duguje Ničeu [What Lukacs owes to Nietzsche, 1979],
- Filozofija strukturalizma [The Philosophy of Structuralism, 1980],
- Dostojevski kao mislilac [Dostoyevski as Thinker, 1981],
- Marksizam i jezuitizam [Marxism and Jesuitism, 1985],
- Psihologija znanja [Psychology of Knowledge, 1989],
- Antinomije marksističkih ideologija [Antinomies of Marxist Ideologies, 1990],
- Pravoslavlje i demokratija [Orthodoxy and Democracy, 1994],
- Književnost i metafizika [Literature and Metaphysics, 1996],
- Filozofija i psihologija [Philosophy and Psychology, 1997],
- Carstvo Božje na zemlji. Filozofija diferencije [Kingdom of God on the Earth. Philosophy of Difference, 1998],
- Ima li istorija smisla [Does History have a Sense?, 1998].

He also published two novels:

- Nit miholjskog leta [The Thread of an Indian Summer, 1999] and
- Kutija od orahovog drveta [A box made of Walnut, 2003].
