= Dragoljub Mićunović =

Serbian politician and philosopher (1930–2026)

- Драгољуб Мићуновић
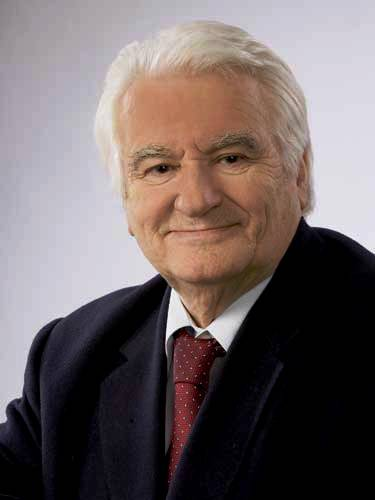

President of the Chamber of Citizens of the Federal Assembly of Yugoslavia
- In office 3 November 2000 – 3 March 2003
- Preceded by: Milomir Minić
- Succeeded by: Position abolished

President of the Assembly of Serbia and Montenegro
- In office 3 March 2003 – 4 March 2004
- Preceded by: Position established
- Succeeded by: Zoran Šami

President of the Democratic Party
- In office 3 February 1990 – 25 January 1994
- Preceded by: Position established
- Succeeded by: Zoran Đinđić

Personal details
- Born: 14 July 1930 Merdare, Yugoslavia
- Died: 26 May 2026 (aged 95) Belgrade, Serbia
- Party: SKJ (formerly); DS (1990–1996, 2004–2026); DC (1996–2004)
- Education: University of Belgrade
- Occupation: Politician; philosopher

Dragoljub Mićunović (Serbian Cyrillic: Драгољуб Мићуновић [ˈdrǎɡɔʎub miˈt͜ɕǔːnɔʋit͜ɕ]; 14 July 1930 – 26 May 2026) was a Serbian politician and philosopher. As one of the founders of the Democratic Party, he served as its leader from 1990 to 1994, and as the president of the parliament of Serbia and Montenegro from 2000 to 2004. In the 1960s and 1970s, he was affiliated with the Praxis School and was a professor at the Faculty of Philosophy of the University of Belgrade. In 1990, he co-founded the Democratic Party and was elected as a member of the National Assembly of Serbia. He remained an MP until 2020, when the Democratic Party boycotted the elections. He was also a presidential candidate in the 2003 Serbian presidential election.

== Early life ==
Dragoljub Mićunović was born on 14 July 1930 in Merdare, Kingdom of Yugoslavia. He spent his childhood in Skopje where his father Mile worked as a civil servant. Following the annexation of parts of Yugoslavia by the Italian puppet Albanian Kingdom and Axis Kingdom of Bulgaria, he sought refuge in the Territory of the Military Commander in Serbia. After World War II, he resumed high school in Kuršumlija and Prokuplje. Mićunović was then sentenced to 20 months of forced labour at Goli Otok island by the Yugoslav authorities for ideological inclinations towards the Soviet Union.

After his release, he became an assistant at the University of Belgrade Faculty of Philosophy. He graduated in 1954. He was part of the Marxist humanist Praxis School from 1964, and in 1975 he was expelled from the faculty, together with seven other colleagues, due to taking part in the 1968 student demonstrations in Yugoslavia. Later, he was lecturer in the United States and Germany.

== Political career ==
Mićunović was one of the members of the Founding Committee of the Democratic Party in December 1989 who began the process of re-establishing the Democratic Party (DS). He was elected the first President of the re-established Democratic Party at the founding party conference on 3 February 1990.

At the first multi-party elections in Serbia in 1990, he was elected a Member of the Parliament of Serbia on behalf of the Democratic Party. As a Member of Parliament on the state level, he was elected a delegate to the Chamber of the Republics and Provinces (upper chamber) of the Assembly of Yugoslavia in the period 1991–1992. At the Federal elections in 1992, Mićunović was elected a Member of the Federal Assembly as a representative of the Democratic Party. As a member of the opposition coalition “Zajedno”, he was re-elected a Member of the Federal Assembly in the Chamber of Citizens (lower chamber) in 1996.

He remained the party's president until 1994, when he was squeezed out from the top spot by Zoran Đinđić. Mićunović resigned and with a group of prominent intellectuals, founded the Center for Democracy Fund, a non-governmental organisation (NGO) for the development of civil society and the non-governmental sector, civil education, and preparation of political and social reforms.

In 1996, Mićunović founded a new political party, Democratic Centre, of which he was elected president.

At the federal elections in 2000, as one of the leaders of the Democratic Opposition of Serbia (DOS) coalition, Mićunović was again elected a Member of Parliament in the Chamber of Citizens of the Federal Assembly. After the victory of the Democratic Opposition of Serbia in October 2000, he was elected President of the Chamber of Citizens of the Federal Assembly on 3 November 2000. When the State Union of Serbia and Montenegro was established, in March 2003, Mićunović was elected President of the Parliament of Serbia and Montenegro on 3 March that year. He held this position until 3 March 2004.

Mićunović was a candidate at the 2003 Serbian presidential election, winning 35.42% of the popular vote, but the election was cancelled due to low turnout (the turnout was 38.8%, considerably less than the 50% of eligible voters threshold required by Serbian law).

Mićunović's Democratic Centre party merged into the Democratic Party in 2004, and he was one of the leading candidates on the Democratic Party list in the Serbian Parliamentary elections held on 21 January 2007. Mićunović remained an MP until 2020; he was last elected in the 2016 Serbian parliamentary election. During his term, he also served as the parliamentary leader of the Democratic Party.

In 2017, Mićunović signed the Declaration on the Common Language of the Croats, Serbs, Bosniaks, and Montenegrins. In January 2020, he stated his opposition to the Democratic Party boycott of the 2020 parliamentary election.

== Personal life and death ==
Mićunović authored five books and over 100 papers. He was bestowed with several awards, including the Legion of Honour. Mićunović was the winner of the first award for tolerance awarded by the Ministry for Human Rights, OSCE, and B92 TV and radio station.

Mićunović died in Belgrade on 26 May 2026, at the age of 95.

Party political offices
Preceded by Post established	President of the Democratic Party; 1990–1994	Succeeded by Zoran Đinđić
