= Miroslav Stefanović (Serbian politician) =

- Мирослав Стефановић

Member of the Assembly of Serbia and Montenegro
- In office 3 March 2003 – 5 March 2004

Member of the Chamber of Citizens in the Assembly of the Federal Republic of Yugoslavia
- In office 7 October 2000 – 3 March 2003
- In office 3 February 1993 – 16 August 1999

President of the Liberals of Serbia
- In office May 2007 – 2010 (acting president until 18 November 2007)
- Preceded by: Radivoje Lazarević
- Succeeded by: none (party disestablished)

Personal details
- Born: 7 December 1962 (age 63) Ljig, PR Serbia, FPR Yugoslavia
- Party: ND/LS (1990–2010)
- Education: University of Belgrade

Miroslav Stefanović (Serbian Cyrillic: Мирослав Стефановић; born 7 December 1947) is a Serbian former politician. He served in the parliaments of the Federal Republic of Yugoslavia (FRY) and the successor State Union of Serbia and Montenegro on an almost continuous basis between 1993 and 2004. Stefanović was a member of New Democracy (ND), which was renamed as the Liberals of Serbia (LS) in 2003; he served as the party's final leader from 2007 to 2010.

== Early life and private career ==
Stefanović was born in Ljig, in what was then the People's Republic of Serbia in the Federal People's Republic of Yugoslavia. He graduated from the University of Belgrade Faculty of Architecture and worked as an architect, designing numerous buildings and winning several awards. He has served as president of the board of directors of the Kolubara company.

== Politician ==
Serbia transitioned from a one-party socialist state to a (nominally) multi-party democracy in 1990, and Stefanović became a founding member of New Democracy in that year. During the 1990s, Serbian political life was dominated by the authoritarian rule of Slobodan Milošević, president of the Socialist Party of Serbia (SPS).

=== DEPOS representative ===
In 1992, New Democracy joined the Democratic Movement of Serbia (DEPOS), an opposition coalition led by the Serbian Renewal Movement (SPO). Stefanović appeared in the second position on the DEPOS electoral list for the Chamber of Citizens in the Užice constituency in the December 1992 Yugoslavian parliamentary election and was assigned a mandate when the list won three seats. (From 1992 to 2000, one-third of the mandates in Yugoslavian parliamentary elections were assigned to candidates on successful lists in numerical order, while the remaining two-thirds were assigned to other candidates at the discretion of the sponsoring parties or coalitions. Stefanović was not automatically elected by virtue of his list position but received a mandate all the same.) He took his seat when the new assembly convened in February 1993; during this time, he was the only New Democracy member of the Chamber of Citizens. The Socialist Party of Serbia and its Montenegrin allies won the election, and the DEPOS representatives served in opposition.

Stefanović became the president of New Democracy's board of directors in March 1993. In the same month, he proposed the establishment of an inquiry committee to ascertain the property status of parliamentarians and their families and to examine the legality of the operations of companies owned or overseen by parliamentarians or their families. In April 1993, he and New Democracy leader Dušan Mihajlović called for the Yugoslavian and Serbian parliaments to formally endorse an open letter sent by Yugoslavian president Dobrica Ćosić, Serbian president Slobodan Milošević, and Montenegrin president Momir Bulatović to the Republika Srpska assembly, urging acceptance of the Vance–Owen plan to end the Bosnian War.

In June 1993, SPO leader Vuk Drašković and his wife Danica were arrested, beaten, and sent to a high-security prison following street protests in Belgrade. When asked about these events, federal minister of human rights and minority rights Margit Savović responded, "Whoever fights, must expect to be beaten." Stefanović condemned this statement, saying that Savović had condoned the violation of the couple's human rights and, in the process, had grossly violated several articles of the Yugoslavian constitution. He later called for an opposition boycott of both the republic and federal parliaments. International pressure ultimately brought about the couple's release from prison, and the boycott did not take place.

Stefanović criticized the powers of the Supreme Defense Council in a September 1993 debate on the Draft Law on the Yugoslav Army, describing the council as being under the control of Milošević.

=== Alliance with the Socialist Party ===
The Socialist Party won 123 out of 250 seats in the 1993 Serbian parliamentary election and achieved a parliamentary majority in February 1994 through a coalition government with New Democracy, which had six seats. Dušan Mihajlović justified the arrangement on the grounds that the party could more effectively influence Serbian politics in government than in opposition. Although New Democracy did not join the government at the federal level, the alliance of the parties effectively made Stefanović a supporter of Yugoslavia's SPS-led administration. In April 1994, he and Mihajlović took part in a Serbian government delegation to Kosovo to promote Dragoslav Avramović's economic program. Notwithstanding this, Stefanović still criticized the government on occasion; later in 1994, he said that New Democracy would withdraw its support from the government if its implementation of the Avramović plan should falter.

In December 1994, Stefanović accused the Democratic Party (DS) of trying to achieve power by illegitimate means, through indirect influence over Elektroprivreda Srbije (EPS) and through incitement to continue the wars in Bosnia and Croatia. DS leader Zoran Đinđić rejected these accusations.

In January 1996, Stefanović submitted a proposal for the Federal Republic of Yugoslavia to join the Partnership for Peace program.

New Democracy participated in the 1996 Yugoslavian parliamentary election as the junior partner in an alliance with the Socialist Party of Serbia and the Yugoslav Left (JUL). Stefanović appeared in the fourth and final position on the alliance's electoral list for the Chamber of Citizens in the smaller, redistributed Užice division. The list won two seats; lead candidate Milisav Čutović of the JUL was automatically elected, and Stefanović received the alliance's "optional" mandate. The SPS–JUL–ND alliance and its Montenegrin partners won the election, and Stefanović initially served as a government supporter. He led New Democracy's federal assembly group, which at the time comprised four members, and took part in negotiations for a new federal administration, emphasizing his party's support for greater integration with Europe and the broader international community.

In July 1997, Stefanović endorsed Slobodan Milošević's candidacy for Yugoslavian president.

New Democracy's alliance with the Socialist Party had irrevocably broken down by mid-1999, and on 16 August of that year Stefanović and two of the party's other representatives in the Chamber of Citizens had their parliamentary mandates revoked. (The fourth representative, Čedomir Mirković, had been dismissed from the party four days earlier after accepting a ministerial position in the federal government.) Stefanović discovered his expulsion on 17 August when a SPO delegate told him that the assembly had accepted his "resignation." He said that he was not surprised that the SPS and JUL, "in their good old Bolshevik custom, would commit such a fraud and forgery."

=== DOS representative ===
In 2000, New Democracy joined the Democratic Opposition of Serbia (DOS), a broad and ideologically diverse coalition of parties opposed to Slobodan Milošević's continued rule. DOS candidate Vojislav Koštunica defeated Milošević in the 2000 Yugoslavian presidential election, and Milošević subsequently fell from power on 5 October 2000, a watershed moment in Serbian and Yugoslavian politics.

Stefanović led the DOS list for Zaječar in the 2000 Yugoslavian parliamentary election, which took place concurrently with the presidential vote, and was elected when the list won two out of four mandates. The DOS won the federal election in Serbia and subsequently formed a coalition government with the Socialist People's Party of Montenegro (SNP CG). Stefanović again served as a government supporter. During this time, he was a vice-president of New Democracy.

Stefanović praised the Serbian ministry of internal affairs for arresting Slobodan Milošević without any loss of life on 31 March 2001. In a written statement, he referred to Milošević's time in power as "the darkest period in the history of the Serbian people, in which misery, violence and fear were the main characteristics of the rule of that man and his dark oligarchy."

In August 2001, Stefanović submitted a proposal for the Federal Republic of Yugoslavia to join the North Atlantic Treaty Organization (NATO). In so doing, he said, "We want to be an equal part of the developed democratic world. In order to become that, we must immediately start making decisive strategic decisions, one of the most important of which would be the one on joining NATO."

Stefanović was the leader of Yugoslavia's parliamentary friendship group with Bulgaria in this period. In January 2002, he held talks at the federal assembly with Bulgaria's ambassador.

The Federal Republic of Yugoslavia was reconstituted as the State Union of Serbia and Montenegro in February 2003. The new country had a unicameral parliament whose members were chosen via indirect election from the republican parliaments of Serbia and Montenegro; only sitting members of the republican parliaments and members of the outgoing Yugoslavian parliament were eligible to serve. By virtue of its standing in the Serbian parliament, the main branch of the DOS (led by the DS and including New Democracy) had the right to nominate thirty-seven members of the new assembly. Stefanović was chosen as one of the alliance's representatives. Shortly thereafter, New Democracy renamed itself as Liberals of Serbia.

Liberals of Serbia contested the 2003 Serbian parliamentary election on its own, and Stefanović appeared in the symbolic 249th and final position on the party's list, which did not cross the electoral threshold for assembly representation. (From 2000 to 2011, all Serbian parliamentary mandates were assigned to candidates on successful lists at the discretion of the sponsoring parties or coalitions, irrespective of numerical order. Stefanović's list position had no specific bearing on his chances of election, although the party's failure to cross the threshold made the point moot.)Serbia's Law on the Election of Representatives (2000) stipulated that parliamentary mandates would be awarded to electoral lists (Article 80) that crossed the electoral threshold (Article 81), that mandates would be given to candidates appearing on the relevant lists (Article 83), and that the submitters of the lists were responsible for selecting their parliamentary delegations within ten days of the final results being published (Article 84). The Serbian parliament elected a new cohort of federal representatives on 12 February 2004, and Stefanović's parliamentary tenure ended shortly thereafter when the new federal assembly convened.

=== After 2004 ===
Liberals of Serbia joined an alliance led by the Serbian Renewal Movement for the 2007 Serbian parliamentary election. Stefanović appeared in the 205th position on the SPO's list, which was mostly alphabetical. This list, too, failed to cross the threshold.

Stefanović became acting president of the LS in May 2007, following the resignation of Radivoje Lazarević. On 18 November 2007, he was chosen without opposition as the party's new leader. By this time, the party was a marginal force in Serbian politics. Stefanović intended to take the LS into a broader coalition for the 2008 Serbian parliamentary election, but ultimately this did not occur. The party ceased to exist in 2010.

Serbia's electoral laws were reformed in 2011, such that all mandates were awarded to candidates on successful lists in numerical order. Stefanović appeared in the eighty-fourth position on a coalition electoral list led by the Democratic Party in the 2016 Serbian parliamentary election. The list won sixteen seats, and he was not elected.
