= Radojko Petrić =

Serbian politician (born 1940)

- Радојко Петрић

Member of the National Assembly of the Republic of Serbia
- In office 22 January 2001 – 27 January 2004

Member of the Chamber of Citizens in the Assembly of the Federal Republic of Yugoslavia
- In office 11 June 1992 – 10 December 1996

Mayor of Prijepolje
- In office c. June 1992 – March 1993
- Succeeded by: Stevan Purić

Personal details
- Born: 1940 (age 85–86)
- Party: SPS

Radojko Petrić (Serbian Cyrillic: Радојко Петрић; born 17 November 1940) is a Serbian retired politician. He has served in the Serbian and Yugoslavian parliaments and was the mayor of Prijepolje from 1992 to 1993. During his political career, Petrić was a member of the Socialist Party of Serbia (SPS).

== Private career ==
Petrić has a Master of Economics degree. For many years, he was director of the Ljubiša Miodragović textile combine.

== Politician ==
=== Federal representative and mayor ===
Serbian political life in the 1990s was dominated by the authoritarian rule of Slobodan Milošević, leader of the Socialist Party.

Petrić was elected to the Federal Republic of Yugoslavia's Chamber of Citizens in the May 1992 Yugoslavian parliamentary election, winning a narrow victory in the Prijepolje constituency. The SPS won a majority victory overall, due in part to a boycott by several leading opposition parties.

He was also elected to the Prijepolje municipal assembly in the May 1992 Serbian local elections, which took place concurrently with the federal vote. The Socialists won a landslide majority victory in Prijepolje, and Petrić was subsequently chosen as president of the local assembly, a position that was then equivalent to mayor. In October 1992, he was elected as a member of the Socialist Party's main board.

Petrić's term as mayor of Prijepolje coincided with early period of the Bosnian War. In August 1992, he denied reports that Bosniak (Muslim) refugees from Bosnia and Herzegovina were being held in camps in Prijepolje and mistreated.

Due to ongoing questions about the legitimacy of the May elections, new federal and local elections took place in December 1992. Prior to the federal vote, Yugoslavia adopted a system of full proportional representation in which one-third of mandates in the Chamber of Citizens were assigned to candidates on successful lists in numerical order, with the remaining two-thirds given to other candidates at the discretion of the sponsoring parties and coalitions. Petrić appeared in the fifth position on the SPS's electoral list for Užice. The list won exactly five seats, and he was awarded a mandate for a second term. The Socialists and their Montenegrin allies won the election, and he served as a government supporter.

Petrić was also re-elected to the Prijepolje assembly in the December 1992 Serbian local elections as the Socialists won a second consecutive majority victory in the municipality. He was nominated for a second term as mayor but, due to divisions in the local ranks of the Socialist Party, did not receive enough support for the position. He continued to lead an interim administration until March 1993, when he stood down from office.

On 27 February 1993, near the end of Petrić's tenure as mayor, members of the "Avengers" Bosnian Serb paramilitary unit under the leadership of Milan Lukić kidnapped eighteen ethnic Bosniaks, one ethnic Croat, and one other person of unknown origin from a Belgrade–Bar train when it briefly crossed from Serbia into Bosnian territory. The victims were later tortured and murdered, an incident known as the Štrpci massacre. Several of the victims were from Prijepolje, and the incident contributed to a rise in tensions between Serbs and Bosniaks in the municipality. Petrić made some efforts to calm the situation, and in the very last days of his mayoralty he arranged for Serbian president Milošević to visit Prijepolje and meet with local Bosniak community representatives. Milošević said that he would "turn heaven and earth" to find the kidnap victims, and Petrić later credited him with preserving the peace of the area.

Evidence has since emerged that some high-ranking Serbian and Yugoslavian officials were complicit in the massacre, at least to the extent of having advance knowledge of the kidnapping and failing to prevent it. Milošević's promise is considered to have been disingenuous, and there have long been suspicions of broader collusion between the "Avengers" and Serbian authorities. There is, however, no suggestion that Petrić was personally implicated in these matters.

The Socialist Party contested in the 1996 Yugoslavian parliamentary election in an alliance with the Yugoslav Left (JUL) and New Democracy (ND). Petrić appeared in the second position out of four on the alliance's list for the smaller, redistributed Užice division. The list won two seats. On this occasion, he was not assigned a new mandate. (Note: The alliance's lead candidate in Užice, Milisav Čutović of the JUL, was automatically elected, and its "optional" mandate was given to fourth-ranked candidate Miroslav Stefanović of New Democracy. See Borba, 30 December 1996, p. 17; and Borba, 11 February 1997, p. 1.)

=== Serbian parliamentarian ===
Slobodan Milošević was defeated in the 2000 Yugoslavian presidential election and subsequently fell from power on 5 October 2000. Serbia's republican government also fell after Milošević's defeat, and a new Serbian parliamentary election was called for December 2000. Prior to the vote, Serbia's electoral laws were reformed such that the entire country became a single at-large electoral division and all mandates were assigned to candidates on successful lists at the discretion of the sponsoring parties and coalitions, irrespective of numerical order. Petrić appeared in the 171st position on the Socialist Party's list, which was mostly alphabetical. The list won thirty-seven mandates; he was included in his party's delegation and took his seat when the assembly convened in January 2001. The Democratic Opposition of Serbia (DOS) won a landslide victory overall, and the Socialists served in opposition for the term that followed. In the assembly, Petrić was a member of the foreign affairs committee and the committee on trade and tourism.

He received the 177th position on the SPS's list in the 2003 Serbian parliamentary election; as in 2000, the list was mostly alphabetical. The Socialists won twenty-two seats, and he was not given a new assembly mandate. His term ended in January 2004.

=== Since 2004 ===
Serbia adopted a system of proportional representation for municipal elections after Milošević's fall from power. Petrić appeared in the second position on the Socialist Party's list for Prijepolje in the 2004 Serbian local elections and was elected when the list won four seats. The party served in opposition for the term that followed.

The Socialists again won four seats in Prijepolje in the 2008 local elections. On this occasion, the municipality did not choose its government by the legal deadline, and a repeat election was held later in the year.

Following the 2008 Serbian parliamentary election (which took place concurrently with the first local vote), the Socialists joined a coalition government at the republican level with the For a European Serbia (ZES) coalition, which was led by the Democratic Party (DS). The DS and SPS, along with G17 Plus and the Serbian Renewal Movement (SPO), subsequently ran a combined election list in Prijepolje for the repeat municipal vote, and the list won nine seats. Afterward, the SPS and DS formed a local coalition government with the Sandžak Democratic Party (SDP) and the Serbian Progressive Party (SNS). Petrić was re-elected to the assembly as a SPS candidate and supported the administration. In early 2012, he strongly criticized a New Serbia (NS) representative who expressed a dislike for "cities with mosques" during an assembly debate; Petrić said that citizens would be shocked by the comment.

He did not seek re-election in the 2012 Serbian local elections.

== Electoral record ==
=== Federal (FR Yugoslavia) ===
May 1992 Yugoslavian federal election: Prijepolje
Candidate	Party	Votes	%
Radojko Petrić	Socialist Party of Serbia	23,398	35.33
Đorđe Pavlović	Serbian Radical Party	20,393	30.79
Miloš Vidaković	Citizens' Group	16,178	24.43
Milan Lučić	League of Communists – Movement for Yugoslavia	6,266	9.46
Total		66,235	100.00
