= Dragoljub Živković (Serbian philosopher) =

Dragoljub S. Živković (Serbian Cyrillic: Драгољуб С. Живковић; born 1937) is a Serbian philosopher and former politician. He has served in the Serbian parliament and the Vojvodina provincial assembly. Živković was at different times a member of the Serbian Renewal Movement (SPO) and the Christian Democratic Party of Serbia (DHSS).

== Early life and career ==
Živković was born in Radijevići in the municipality of Nova Varoš, in what was then the Zeta Banovina of the Kingdom of Yugoslavia. He finished high school in Sarajevo and later attended the University of Belgrade Faculty of Political Sciences, ultimately earning a Ph.D. in Philosophy. He became a full professor at the University of Priština in Kosovo, and in 1983 authored a work entitled Karl Marx and Friedrich Engels – Life and Works. He has published widely in his field.

Initially, Živković's perspective was broadly consistent with the governing ideology of the Socialist Federal Republic of Yugoslavia (SFRY). In a 1981 gathering organized by the Marxist Centre of the League of Communists of Serbia (SKS) and the National Library of Serbia, he said that all workers were objectively Marxists and that philosophy was nothing other than “the self-conscious awakening of the revolutionary masses."

The political climate of Kosovo became increasingly fraught in the late 1980s, with divisions rising between the province's Serb and Albanian communities. Živković criticized the effects of this division on academic life at the University of Priština, saying in 1988 that both politics and academia in the province were trending toward counter-revolution. In February 1990, he lamented that two parallel academic streams had emerged, respectively in Serbo-Croatian and Albanian. He said that the university had ceased to focus on teaching and the scientific process but was instead offering "basic training for terrorism" and "turning Kosovo into Lebanon" (referring to the profound ethnic divisions in that country) and called for Socialist Republic of Serbia's Law on Universities to be applied to the institution. Inter-communal relations continued to worsen after this time, and for most of the 1990s Kosovo Albanians generally boycotted Serbian state institutions and participated in parallel structures.

Serbia transitioned from a one-party socialist state to a (nominally) multi-party democracy in 1990, and Živković appears to have turned away from socialist ideology at around the same time. In an October 1990 speech at a meeting of the New Democracy (ND) party, he blamed the situation in Kosovo on a number of factors, including "the attitude towards work, the fetishization of belonging to the Albanian nation, political Bolshevism," and compulsory university education. He called for the complete integration of Kosovo into Serbia's economic and legal system, while also criticizing recent moves toward "a police state that creates only apparent peace." He later wrote, "let the state use its instruments to protect its interests, and not push every Serb and every Albanian to control each other, to govern each other."

In the aftermath of the 1998–99 Kosovo War, the Philosophy department of the (Serb) University of Priština was temporarily relocated to Blace in Central Serbia. In this period, Živković was one of a number of professors who criticized the Serbian government for its "military-partisan" oversight of the university. He subsequently moved to Pančevo in the province of Vojvodina. In January 2002, he was chosen as president of the Writers' Association of Pančevo.

== Politician ==
Živković ran as a candidate of the Serbian Renewal Movement for the Nova Varoš and Čajetina division in the 1990 Serbian parliamentary election. He lost to Milisav Čutović of the Socialist Party of Serbia (SPS) in the second round of voting.

Serbia subsequently adopted a system of proportional representation for republican elections. The SPO contested the 1992 Serbian parliamentary election as part of the Democratic Movement of Serbia (DEPOS) coalition, and Živković appeared in the eleventh position on the coalition's electoral list for the Užice division. The list won six seats in the division, and Živković was included in his party's delegation, taking his seat when the assembly convened in January 1993. (From 1992 to 2000, Serbia's electoral law stipulated that one-third of assembly mandates would be assigned to candidates on successful lists in numerical order and the remaining two-thirds to other candidates at the discretion of the sponsoring parties or coalitions. Živković was given one of DEPOS's "optional" mandates.) The Socialist Party won a plurality victory overall and governed with informal support from the far-right Serbian Radical Party (SRS), while the DEPOS coalition served in opposition. In the assembly, Živković served on the committee on Kosovo and Metohija and the committee on education, physical culture, and sports.

The Socialist–Radical alliance subsequently broke down, and a new parliamentary election took place in late 1993. This time, Živković appeared in the ninth position on the DEPOS list for Užice. The coalition once again won six seats in the division; on this occasion, however, Živković was not assigned a new mandate, and his term ended when the new assembly convened in January 1994.

The Serbian Renewal Movement experienced a split in 1994–95, with Slobodan Rakitić creating a breakaway group called the Parliamentary People's Party (SNS; also known as the Assembly National Party). Živković joined the new party; in June 1998, he said that it would "establish the closest possible cooperation" with the Democratic Party of Serbia (DSS).

By 2000, Živković was a member of the Christian Democratic Party of Serbia, one of the parties in the Democratic Opposition of Serbia (DOS), a broad and ideologically diverse coalition of parties opposed to the continued rule of Slobodan Milošević and the Socialist Party of Serbia. Živković was elected to the Vojvodina provincial assembly for Pančevo's first division in the 2000 provincial election; the DOS and its allies in the Alliance of Vojvodina Hungarians (VMSZ) won a landslide victory overall, and he served as a government supporter. In 2003, he sponsored a proposal to revive the Vojvodina Academy of Sciences and Arts (VANU) as an entity separate from the Serbian Academy of Sciences and Arts (SANU). He also oversaw a commission on the number of victims in the territory of Vojvodina during World War II. He did not seek re-election in 2004.

== Electoral record ==
=== Provincial (Vojvodina) ===
2000 Vojvodina provincial election: Pančevo Division 1
Candidate	Party	Votes	%
Prof. Dr. Dragoljub Živković	Democratic Opposition of Serbia–Dr. Vojislav Koštunica (Affiliation: Christian Democratic Party of Serbia)		elected
Petar Došen	Socialist Party of Serbia–Yugoslav Left–Slobodan Milošević		
Sava Škundrić	Serbian Radical Party		
Sava Vukašinov	Democratic Movement for Pančevo		
Total			
Source: All candidates except Živković are listed alphabetically.

=== National Assembly of Serbia ===
1990 Serbian parliamentary election: Nova Varoš and Čajetina
Candidate	Party	First round		Second round	
Candidate	Party	Votes	%	Votes	%
Milisav Čutović	Socialist Party of Serbia		42.54		elected
Dr. Dragoljub Živković	Serbian Renewal Movement		28.70		defeated
Murat Čolaković	Citizens' Group		defeated		
Budimir Milanović	Democratic Party		defeated		
Dragoje Vukmanović	Citizens' Group		defeated		
Đoko Zečević	Liberal Party		defeated		
Total					
Source: All candidates except Čutović and Živković are listed alphabetically.
