= List of mayors of Valjevo =

Mayor of Valjevo
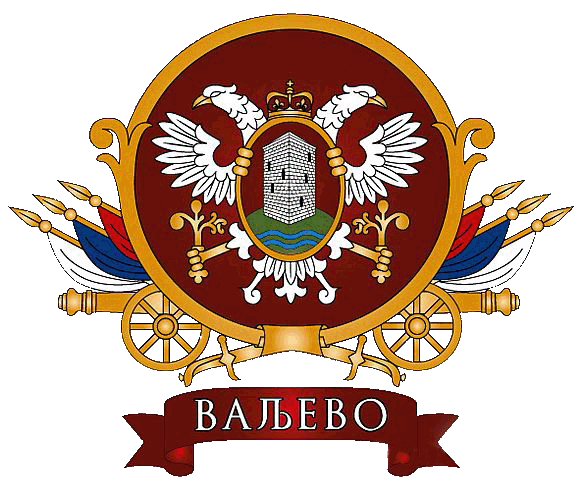
- Coat of arms of Valjevo
- Incumbent; Lazar Gojković since 18 August 2020
- Style: Mayor
- Member of: City Council
- Reports to: City Assembly
- Residence: No official residence
- Seat: City Hall
- Term length: 4 years
- Inaugural holder: Milivoj Tomić
- Formation: 1839

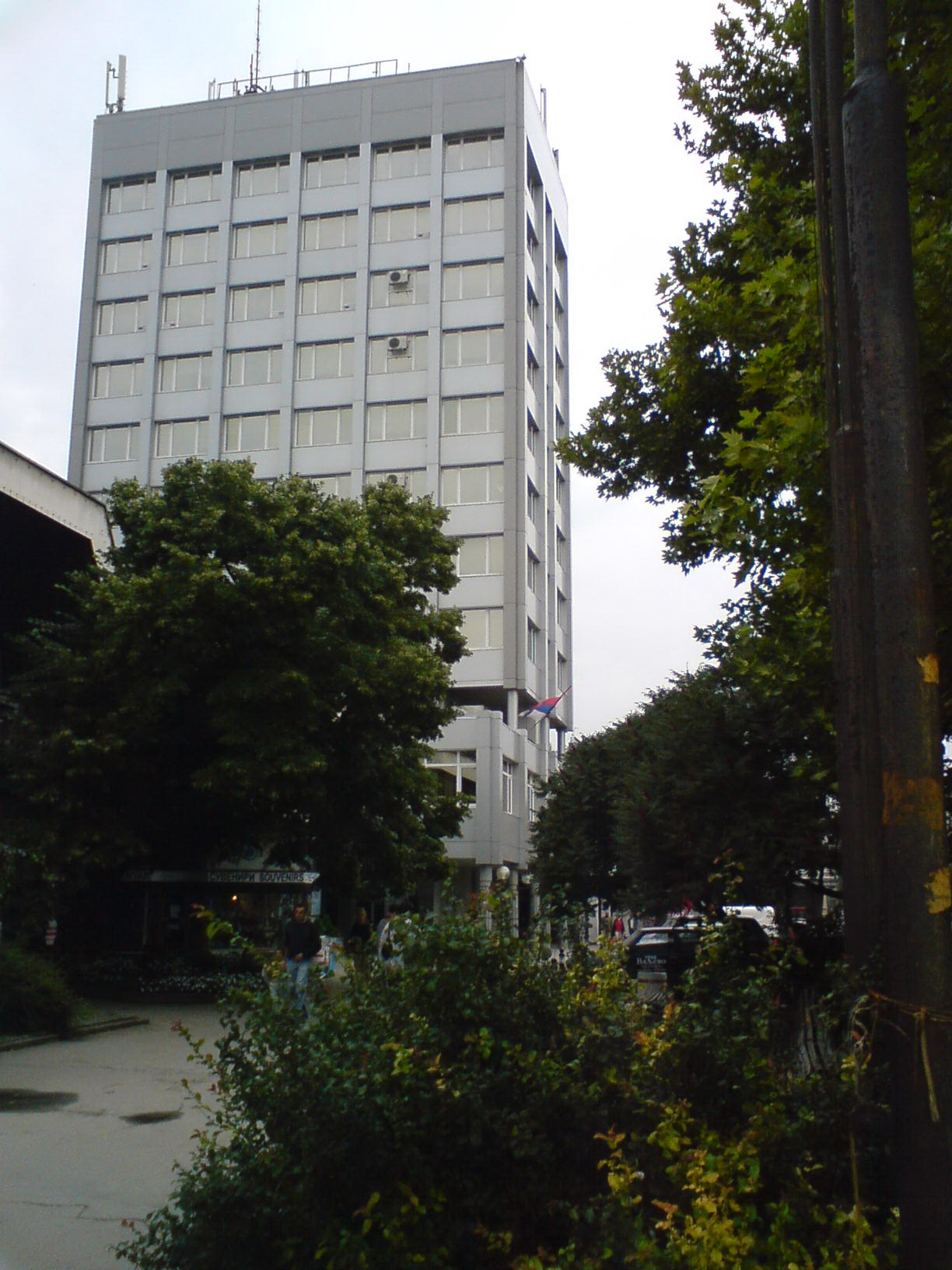
The City Hall - Office of the mayor.

This is a list of presidents of the Municipality of Valjevo, Presidents of the City Assembly of Valjevo and Mayors of Valjevo since 1839.

The mayor of Valjevo is the head of the City of Valjevo (the thirteenth largest city in Serbia). He acts on behalf of the City, and performs an executive function in the City of Valjevo. The current mayor of Valjevo is Lazar Gojković (SNS).

== Principality of Serbia ==
- Milivoj Tomić (1839 – October 1842)
- Milovan B. Tadić (1842 – 1845)
- Pavle Milivojević Balinovac (1845 – 1848)
- Milovan B. Tadić (1848 – 1850)
- Pavle Milivojević Balinovac (1850 – 1856)
- Dimitrije Mitrović (1856 – 1858)
- Živko Tadić (1860 – 1861)
- Kosta A. Stojšić (1861 – 1864)
- Živko Tadić (1864)
- Ljubomir Tadić (1865 – 1866)
- Živko Tadić (1866)
- Jakov Mihajlović (1866 – 1867)
- Radovan Lazić (1867 – 1869)
- Živko Tadić (1873)
- Miloš Glišić (1874 – 1876)
- Živko S. Gavrilović (1877)
- Kosta Popović (1877 – 1878)
- Kasijan Stojšić (1878 – 1879)
- Lazar V. Lazarević (1881)

== Kingdom of Serbia ==
- Lazar V. Lazarević (1883)
- Vučić Milovanović (1883 – 1884)
- Miladin Ljubičić (1884 – 1885)
- Ljubomir S. Đukić (1885 – 29 August 1887)
- Lazar V. Lazarević (1887 – 1889)
- Lazar V. Lazarević (1890 – 1892)
- Janko I. Babić (11 March 1892 – January 1893)
- Sreten Đurić (7 February 1893 – 20 June 1893)
- Janko I. Babić (20 June 1893 – December 1893)
- Pavle M. Janković (1893 – 1894)
- Dragutin Dragić Atanacković (1894 – 1895)
- Stevan Korać (15 October 1895 – 1896)
- Milinko Drašković (17 December 1896 – 1897)
- Marjan N. Birčanin (1897 – 1900)
- Manojlo Panjević (1900 – 1901)
- Marjan N. Birčanin (1902)
- Mateja Mata Nenadović (1 November 1903 – 18 January 1906)
- Stevan T. Janković (18 January 1906 – 1 March 1906) (acting)
- Rista Topalović (1 March 1906 – 1 April 1912)
- Vojislav R. Tadić (1 April 1912 – 1 February 1914)
- Milan Matić (1 February 1914 – October 1915)
- Milutin Dojčinović (12 October 1915 – 1916) (appointed by Austro-Hungarian occupation authority)
- Dimitrije Milić (1916 – October 1918) (appointed by Austro-Hungarian occupation authority)

== Kingdom of Serbs, Croats and Slovenes / Kingdom of Yugoslavia ==
- Milan Matić (October 1918 – August 1920)
- Mirko Obradović (22 August 1920 – 1921)
- Strahinja Laušević (23 January 1921 – 1926)
- Konstantin Todorović (1926 – 1934)
- Marko Babić (1934 – 1935)
- Aleksandar O. Lomić (1 September 1935 – 1938)
- Žarko V. Tadić (1938 – 1941)

== Nedić's regime under Nazi German occupation ==
- Marko Babić (1941)
- Božidar Luković (November 1941 – 1 July 1943)
- Marko Babić (1943 – 1944)

== DF Yugoslavia / FPR Yugoslavia / SFR Yugoslavia ==
- Živojin P. Isailović (October 1944 – 20 December 1946)
- Vasilije Nožica (20 December 1946 – 27 November 1947)
- Živorad Ljubičić (27 November 1947 – 9 August 1948)
- Vukosan Urošević (9 August 1948 – 30 January 1950)
- Vasilije Nožica (30 January 1950 – April 1952)
- Dušan Vojinović (April 1952 – 29 July 1955)
- Grozdan Đukanović (29 July 1955 – 17 November 1957)
- Radomir Vićentijević (17 November 1957 – 28 December 1959)
- Slobodan Milivojević (28 December 1959 – 3 July 1963)
- Ljubiša Milošević (3 July 1963 – 20 May 1967)
- Slobodan Milivojević (20 May 1967 – 29 April 1969)
- Desimir Maksimović (29 April 1969 – 26 April 1974)
- Sreten Janković (26 April 1974 – 21 April 1978)
- Živko I. Petrović (21 April 1978 – April 1984)
- Borko Mitrović (20 April 1984 – 21 April 1986)
- Dušan Mihajlović (21 April 1986 – 1989)

== FR Yugoslavia / Serbia and Montenegro ==
Portrait	Name (Birth–Death)	Term of office		Party
	Slobodan Đukić (born 1941)	1989	June 1992	New Democracy
	Milorad Ilić (born 1952)	June 1992	16 October 2000	Socialist Party of Serbia
	Tomislav Milanović (born 1957)	16 October 2000	October 2004	Democratic Party
	Jovan Tomić (born 1938)	October 2004	5 June 2006	New Serbia

== Republic of Serbia ==
Portrait	Name (Birth–Death)	Term of office		Party
	Jovan Tomić (born 1938)	5 June 2006	13 July 2008	New Serbia
	Zoran Jakovljević (born 1959)	13 July 2008	6 July 2012	Democratic Party
	Stanko Terzić (born 1952)	6 July 2012	20 June 2016	Socialist Party of Serbia
	Slobodan Gvozdenović (born 1965)	20 June 2016	18 August 2020	Serbian Progressive Party
	Lazar Gojković (born 1984)	18 August 2020	Incumbent	Serbian Progressive Party

== Sources ==
- Grad Valjevo - Predsednici opštine i gradonačelnici Valjeva 1839–2008 (in Serbian)
