= Radivoje Lazarević =

Serbian politician and diplomat

Radivoje Lazarević (Serbian Cyrillic: Радивоје Лазаревић; born 18 January 1962) is a Serbian former politician and diplomat. He was briefly a member of the Serbian parliament in 2001, served as ambassador to Brazil from 2001 to 2005, and led Liberals of Serbia (LS), previously known as New Democracy (ND), from 2005 to 2007.

== Early life and career ==
Lazarević was born in the village of Oglađenovac in Valjevo, in what was then the People's Republic of Serbia in the Federal People's Republic of Yugoslavia. He became active as an amateur radio operator in high school and has won several awards in the field, including at an international level. In May 1981, while serving as a cadet-corporal, he won first place in a Yugoslav People's Army (JNA) radio-telegraph competition for soldiers.

He is a graduate of the University of Belgrade Faculty of Political Sciences and later earned a master's degree in the same discipline.

== Politician ==
=== Early years ===
Lazarević was a delegate to the republican conference of the Socialist Youth Union of Serbia in the late 1980s. In July 1990, he became a member of the inaugural presidential board of the successor Social Democratic Youth Alliance of Serbia — New Democracy. In a speech to assembled delegates at the new party's formation, he said that the "youth party" would fight for parliamentary government, civil liberal democracy, and a society based on social and political justice. A month after its formation, the party changed its name to New Democracy – Movement for Serbia.

During the 1990s, Serbian political life was dominated by the authoritarian rule of Slobodan Milošević, leader of the Socialist Party of Serbia (SPS). Lazarević ran as a New Democracy candidate for New Belgrade's second division in the 1990 Serbian parliamentary election and was defeated in the first round of voting; the winning candidate was high-profile Socialist Bogdan Trifunović. New Democracy subsequently joined the Democratic Movement of Serbia (DEPOS) opposition coalition, which was led by the Serbian Renewal Movement (SPO).

Prior to the 1992 parliamentary election, Serbia adopted a system of proportional representation in which one-third of the national assembly mandates were assigned to candidates on successful electoral lists in numerical order, with the remaining two-thirds assigned to other candidates at the discretion of the sponsoring parties or coalitions. Lazarević, who was by this time a vice president of New Democracy, appeared in the twenty-sixth position on the DEPOS list for Belgrade. The list won fifteen seats, and he did not receive a mandate. In January 1993, he represented New Democracy in all-party talks with Federal Republic of Yugoslavia president Dobrica Ćosić on the formation of a new federal government.

=== Alliance with the Socialist Party ===
The Socialist Party won 123 out of 250 seats in the 1993 Serbian parliamentary election and achieved a parliamentary majority in February 1994 through a coalition government with New Democracy, which had six seats. New Democracy leader Dušan Mihajlović justified the alliance on the grounds that the party could more effectively influence Serbian politics in government than in opposition.

Lazarević became president of New Democracy's executive board in March 1994. He supported resolution of the ongoing wars in Croatia and Bosnia by peaceful, diplomatic means, including direct negotiations between the warring parties. In May 1995, he argued that the international community should change its view that Serbs alone were responsible for the conflicts and lift ongoing sanctions against Yugoslavia. Just before the start of Croatia's Operation Storm in August 1995, he called on the international community to stop Croatian president Franjo Tuđman's "aggressive policy," which he described as "currently the biggest obstacle to peace in those areas."

When the North Atlantic Treaty Organization (NATO) began bombing the Republika Srpska (RS) later in August 1995, Lazarević said, "Although the international community used a problematic occasion for this attack, we still believe that a large part of the blame lies with the RS leadership." He subsequently welcomed the Dayton Agreement to end the Bosnian conflict.

Lazarević was again chosen as a New Democracy vice president in March 1997. In June of the same year, he took part in multi-party discussions organized by the Serbian government on the financing of political parties. During the 1997 Serbian parliamentary election (in which he was not a candidate), he called for the normalization of relations with all surrounding countries and for Yugoslavia to join the Partnership for Peace.

Dušan Mihajlović submitted his resignation as New Democracy leader in late October 1997, and Lazarević briefly served as the party's acting president; on 8 November 1997, the party presidency reaffirmed its confidence in Mihajlović. In February 1998, Lazarević represented New Democracy in talks with incoming Serbian prime minister Mirko Marjanović on the formation of a new republican government. New Democracy was not included in the new government and later ended its alliance with the Socialists.

=== DOS representative and diplomat ===
In 2000, New Democracy joined the Democratic Opposition of Serbia (DOS), a broad and ideologically diverse coalition of parties opposed to Slobodan Milošević's continued rule. DOS candidate Vojislav Koštunica defeated Milošević in the 2000 Yugoslavian presidential election, and Milošević fell from power on 5 October 2000, a watershed moment in Serbian politics. Serbia's government also fell after Milošević's defeat, and a new republican parliamentary election was called for December 2000.

Prior to the December 2000 vote, Serbia's electoral laws were changed so that the entire country became a single "at-large" electoral division and all parliamentary mandates were awarded to candidates on successful lists at the discretion of the sponsoring parties or coalitions, irrespective of numerical order. Lazarević was New Democracy's lead candidate in the election, appearing in the fifth position on the DOS list. The DOS won a landslide victory with 176 and 250 seats, and he was awarded an assembly mandate, taking his seat when the new parliament convened in January 2001.

Lazarević's term in the national assembly was ultimately brief. He officially resigned his seat on 10 May 2001, having been appointed as the Federal Republic of Yugoslavia's ambassador to Brazil. On 13 June 2001, he presented his credentials to Brazilian president Fernando Henrique Cardoso. He continued to serve as ambassador when the Federal Republic of Yugoslavia was restructured as the State Union of Serbia and Montenegro in 2003; his term ended in April 2005. Lazarević later said that he needed to learn tennis, golf, and bridge to be accepted as a member of the diplomatic corps.

New Democracy changed its name to Liberals of Serbia in 2003 and contested that year's Serbian parliamentary election on its own. Lazarević appeared in the symbolic next-to-last position (i.e., 248th) on the party's electoral list. The list did not cross the electoral threshold for assembly representation.

=== Liberals of Serbia leader ===
Lazarević succeeded Dušan Mihajlović as LS leader in early October 2005. Mihajlović said that he had been planning to resign in favour of Lazarević for some time but could not do so while the latter was still serving as ambassador to Brazil. By the time Lazarević became party leader, Liberals of Serbia had become a fairly marginal force within Serbian politics.

Lazarević led Liberals of Serbia into an alliance with the Serbian Renewal Movement for the 2007 Serbian parliamentary election and appeared in the ninety-seventh position on the SPO's electoral list, which was mostly alphabetical. This list, too, failed to cross the electoral threshold. He resigned as party leader in May 2007 and was succeeded by Miroslav Stefanović.

== Electoral record ==
=== National Assembly of Serbia ===
1990 Serbian parliamentary election: New Belgrade II
Candidate	Party	First round		Second round	
Candidate	Party	Votes	%	Votes	%
Dr. Bogdan Trifunović	Socialist Party of Serbia		48.59		elected
Branislav Crnčević (incumbent)	Serb Democratic Party		24.98		defeated
Radivoje Lazarević	New Democracy – Movement for Serbia		defeated		
Božidar Nikolić	Democratic Party		defeated		
Dr. Nedeljka Pavlović	Serbian Renewal Movement		defeated		
Dragana Petrić	Serbian National Renewal		defeated		
Rade Radovanović	Association for the Yugoslav Democratic Initiative– Union of Reform Forces of Yugoslavia in Serbia (Affiliation: Association for the Yugoslav Democratic Initiative)		defeated		
Dr. Mila Vidin	Green Party		defeated		
Total					
Source: All candidates except Trifunović and Crnčević are listed alphabetically.
