= Milisav Čutović =

Serbian politician (born 1952)

- Милисав Чутовић

Member of the Chamber of Citizens in the Assembly of the Federal Republic of Yugoslavia
- In office 10 December 1996 – 3 March 2003

Member of the National Assembly of the Republic of Serbia
- In office 11 January 1991 – 25 January 1993

Personal details
- Born: 1952 (age 73–74) Pranjani, Gornji Milanovac, PR Serbia, FPR Yugoslavia
- Party: SPS (1990–1994); JUL (1994–?)

Milisav Čutović (Serbian Cyrillic: Милисав Чутовић; born 1952) is a Serbian medical doctor, entrepreneur, and former politician. He served in the Serbian and Yugoslavian parliaments and was at different times a member of the Socialist Party of Serbia (SPS) and the Yugoslav Left (JUL).

== Early life and private career ==
Čutović was born in the village of Pranjani near Gornji Milanovac, in what was then the People's Republic of Serbia in the Federal People's Republic of Yugoslavia. He completed high school in Čačak in 1971, graduated from the University of Belgrade Faculty of Medicine in 1977, and passed the specialist examination in internal medicine in 1985. In 1996, he earned a Doctor of Medical Science degree.

He began working at the health centre in Pecka in 1979. The following year, he transferred to the Zlatibor institute, where he later became director, serving in this role until 2000. He has taught at the Faculty of Medicine and published in his field.

In 1989, Čutović played a vital role in launching the Zlatibor Institute's "Čigota" recreational program. He oversaw the program for several years, increasing his public profile within Serbia as it became popular with tourists to the scenic Zlatibor area. He condemned a Tomahawk missile assault on the Zlatibor Institute during the NATO bombing of Yugoslavia, saying it was "incomprehensible" that the facility would be targeted.

In the 2000s, he began construction of the private spa complex Prva nova banja in Banja Vrujci, Mionica, which was however not completed.

== Politician ==
=== Serbian parliamentarian ===
During the 1990s, Serbian political life was dominated by the authoritarian rule of Socialist Party leader Slobodan Milošević. Čutović was elected for the division of Nova Varoš and Čajetina as a Socialist Party candidate in the 1990 Serbian parliamentary election and took his seat when the assembly convened in January 1991. The Socialists won a majority victory, and he served as a government supporter.

Čutović was a frequent commentator on health issues during his term in the republican parliament; as with most of the country's social institutions, Serbia's health system fell into in crisis before and during the Yugoslav Wars of the 1990s. In May 1991, Serbia's health minister Nikola Mitrović reluctantly proposed a system of additional fees to make up for a significant deficit in the republican health budget. Čutović criticized this measure, arguing that would it only "temporarily put out the fire" in the field. He later criticized Mitrović's suggestion for a health sector "crisis headquarters" comprising doctors from all regions of Serbia, on the grounds that there was no effective authority at the centre of government for this "headquarters" to communicate with. In June 1992, he participated in a meeting of health experts with Yugoslavian president Dobrica Ćosić to discuss the ongoing situation.

The newspaper Borba printed an article in August 1991 indicating that municipal officials in Nova Varoš were often unable to communicate with Čutović, whom they said had scarcely been in the municipality since his election. "Our initiatives regarding the problems of roads, agriculture and forests have no chance of reaching the Serbian parliament," said one official.

Late in his parliamentary term, Čutović said that he supported Serbia's efforts to fight the effects of international sanctions against the Federal Republic of Yugoslavia but criticized the government for not investing in tourism as a strategic means of alleviating the financial burden. He specifically called for loans directed toward the purchase of fuel and heating for winter tourism.

Čutović was not a candidate in the 1992 Serbian parliamentary election, and his term ended when the new assembly convened in January 1993. He later left the Socialist Party and joined the Yugoslav Left on or shortly after its founding in 1994.

=== Yugoslavian parliamentarian ===
The Yugoslav Left contested the 1996 Yugoslavian parliamentary election in an alliance with the Socialist Party and New Democracy (ND), and Čutović led the alliance's electoral list in Užice for the Chamber of Citizens. The list won two seats in the division; as the lead candidate, Čutović was automatically elected. (Note: Under Yugoslavia's electoral law at the time, only the first of the SPS–JUL–ND alliance's two mandates for Užice was automatically assigned in numerical order. The other mandate was assigned at the alliance's discretion to another candidate on the list. See "SPO deset, ostali 12 poslanika", Naša borba, 29 July 1997, accessed 25 January 2026.) The SPS–JUL–ND alliance and its Montenegrin partners won a majority victory overall, and Čutović again served as a government supporter. In December 1996, he was chosen as president of the committee for labour, health, and environmental protection.

Čutović led Yugoslavia's delegation to the Parliamentary Conference on Environmental and Industrial Safety Legislation in Budapest in 1997. He later led the federal republic's delegation to the 1998 Winter Olympics in Nagano, Japan. He was elected to the main board of the Yugoslav Left in July 1998.

In late 1999, Čutović said that the Federal Republic of Yugoslavia achieved a moral and political victory after the NATO bombing earlier in the year, remarking, "The political pressure on Yugoslavia is easing in the world, especially in Europe, where certain circles of people who do not belong to the official government are awakening." Late in his first federal term, he took part in a Yugoslavian delegation to the Parliamentary Assembly of the Union of Belarus and Russia. At the meeting, he said that three things were necessary for addressing the consequences of NATO's actions: the abolition of "cruel and meaningless" sanctions, the abolition of the International Criminal Tribunal for the former Yugoslavia (ICTY), and compensation for the "enormous material damage" caused by the bombing campaign.

Slobodan Milošević was defeated in the 2000 Yugoslavian presidential election and subsequently fell from power on 5 October 2000. Čutović led a SPS–JUL list for Užice in the concurrent Yugoslavian parliamentary election and was re-elected when the list won two seats. During the campaign, he said that the elections were "not just a mere struggle for power, but an effort to preserve [the] people, sovereignty and territorial integrity of the country." He described the Democratic Opposition of Serbia (DOS) as "an outpost of external enemies led by the USA and the NATO countries that carried out aggression against our country last year."

Although Čutović was personally re-elected, the DOS won the Yugoslavian parliamentary elections in Serbia and subsequently formed a coalition government with the Socialist People's Party of Montenegro (SNP CG). Čutović appears to have served for the full term that followed, but he did not play a prominent role in the assembly. The Yugoslavian parliament ceased to exist in February 2003, when the Federal Republic of Yugoslavia was restructured as the State Union of Serbia and Montenegro.

== Since 2003 ==
Čutović later became the owner of MB Consulting. In November 2012, he and another company executive were arrested on the change of abuse of an official position during the construction and sale of apartments in Belgrade. It was reported in early 2013 that the original charges would be dismissed and that he would instead be tried on a lesser charge. Online accounts do not clarify how the matter was resolved.

He remains active as a balneoclimatologist and a promoter of the health benefits of spas.

== Electoral record ==
=== National Assembly of Serbia ===
1990 Serbian parliamentary election: Nova Varoš and Čajetina
Candidate	Party	First round		Second round	
Candidate	Party	Votes	%	Votes	%
Milisav Čutović	Socialist Party of Serbia		42.54		elected
Dr. Dragoljub Živković	Serbian Renewal Movement		28.70		defeated
Murat Čolaković	Citizens' Group		defeated		
Budimir Milanović	Democratic Party		defeated		
Dragoje Vukmanović	Citizens' Group		defeated		
Đoko Zečević	Liberal Party		defeated		
Total					
Source: All candidates except Čutović and Živković are listed alphabetically.
