= Čedomir Mirković =

Serbian writer, literary critic, and politician

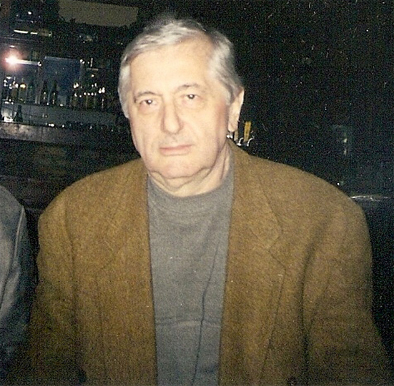
- Mirković in 2004
- Born: 18 January 1944; Nevade, Gornji Milanovac, Yugoslavia
- Died: 25 April 2005 (aged 61); Belgrade, Serbia and Montenegro
- Resting place: Belgrade New Cemetery
- Occupations: Writer, literary critic

Čedomir Mirković (Serbian Cyrillic: Чедомир Мирковић; 18 January 1944 – 25 April 2005) was a Serbian writer, literary critic, television journalist, publisher and politician.

== Biography ==
Mirković grew up in his native place Nevade, attended the primary school in Svračkovci (1950–54), and the secondary school (gymnasium) in Gornji Milanovac, where he graduated with maturity diploma in 1962, then he studied at the Department of Yugoslav Literature and Serbo-Croatian language of the Philological Faculty of Belgrade's University, graduated with diploma in 1966, and continued postgraduate studies until 1968. After completion of his studies, he stayed in the Serbian capital and taught in the field of teacher education until 1973, and exactly this year, he started his working career at TV Belgrade, became editor-in chief of educational program in 1975, then he took over the editorial management of the cultural program from 1983 to 1991, and at least, he became appointed member of the TV board of directors in 1996, but two years ago, he already left the broadcast corporation, switched to publishing business and became managing director of the renowned Prosveta company, which he led successfully from 1994 to 2000. He became a member of the Association of Writers in 1971 and was its elected vice president since December 2004.

He was also a member of the Socialist Party (SPS) due to his cultural-political work and position, but in January 1993, he was sent together with many other journalists to a so-called compulsory vacation, a euphemistic expression of the Milošević regime, with which they were effectively removed from public life, and their oppositional influence on the society should be prevented by this measure. Hundreds of journalists were temporarily dismissed without the option to appeal the dismissal.

In consequence, a faction under the leadership of Mirković split off from the SPS with the aim of establishing a Social Democratic Party, seeking to present a reformist political agenda. However, in November 1993, this new party only received 0.2 percent approval in an opinion poll for the parliamentary election and had no chance actually. In July 1994, he became deputy chairman of Dušan Mihajlović's Nova demokratija. Absolute highlight of his political career was the appointment as Minister of International Cultural and Scientific Cooperation in the second cabinet of Prime Minister Momir Bulatović, but this tenure was short, began in August 1999 and already ended in November 2000. In addition, he was also sanctioned by the European Union as a representative of the Milošević regime during Kosovo War: he got an entry ban like many other officials.

He died suddenly and unexpectedly on 25 April 2005 after a stroke, and he is interred in the Alley of Distinguished Citizens of the Belgrade New Cemetery.

== Work ==
In the field of contemporary Serbian literature, Mirković was considered to be an experienced assessor, whose reviews were based on extensive aesthetic knowledge, which he was able to convey in a popular way, both with empathy and perceptive statement, but always at a high level without any polemic nuances. Throughout his writing career, hundreds of reviews have been published in literary journals and newspapers such as Borba, Politika, Polja, Književna reč and many others. There was almost no significant Serbian writer of the second half of the last century whose work he did not shed light on and interpret.

Reviews, Essays, Notes, Records, Literary studies (selection)

- Pisci, knjige, čitaoci (Writers, Books, Readers), 1978
- Jedna decenija: književna vrednovanja (One Decade: Literary Evaluation), 1981
- Bez iluzija (Without Illusions), 1981
- Ponoćni dnevnik (Midnight Journal), 1983
- U kritičarskoj dokolici (Leisure Reviews), 1987
- Subotnji dnevnik (Saturday's Diary), 1989
- Nove dokolice (New Leisure), 1989
- Argumenti i ocene : književna vrednovanja (Arguments and Ratings: Literary Evaluation), 1984
- Zmajev znak na koricama (Dragon Sign Cover), 1992
- Nevidljivi okviri (Invisible Frames), 1994
- U đavolovom vidokrugu: šezdeset šest savremenih srpskih pesnika (In the Devil's Vision: Sixty six Contemporary Serbian Poets), 1996
- Krugovi tajanstvene svetlosti: trideset tri savremena srpska pripovedača (Circles of Mysterious Light: Thirty three Contemporary Serbian Narrators), 1997
- Odrednice (Run-On Sentences), 2000

Narrations, Short stories

- Pogorelci (Fire Victims), 1986
- Mrak u mraku (Darkness In The Dark), 1999
- Riblja kost (Fishbone), 2000

English edition

- Darkness In The Dark, short stories, Dereta, Belgrade 2001, ISBN 86-7346-201-0.

== Awards ==
- Isidora Sekulić Award 1974 for his complete work of essays and literary critics
- Milan Bogdanović Award 1990 for his critics on Serbian literature in newspapers
- Jedinstvo Award 1989 for Subotnji dnevnik

== Čedomir Mirković Award ==
In memory of author's life achievement, the Association of Writers endows a literary prize for remarkable contribution to contemporary literary criticism of previous year, awarded annually since 2016.

List of Laureates

- Aleksandar Jerkov, 2021
- Bojana Stojanović Pantović, 2020
- Marko Nedić, 2019
- Mićo Cvijetić, 2018
- Danica Andrejević, 2017
- Srba Ignjatović, 2016
- Miloš Petrović, 2015
