= 1991 Rakovica I by-election =

← 1990
- 16 June 1991 (first round)
- 30 June 1991 (second round)
- Turnout: 40.07% (first round); 30.61% (second round)
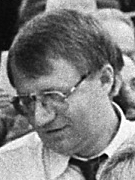

	First party	Second party
Candidate	Vojislav Šešelj	Radoš Karaklajić
Party	SRS	SPS
Popular vote	6,886	1,663
Percentage	80.08%	19.92%
Member of the National Assembly before election
Vacant (Note: Miodrag Bulatović of the Socialist Party of Serbia died in office.)
Elected Member of the National Assembly
Vojislav Šešelj
SRS

A by-election in the Rakovica I constituency in Serbia was held in June 1991. The election was called after the death of representative Miodrag Bulatović of the Socialist Party of Serbia (SPS), and was contested by Radoš Karaklajić of SPS, Vojislav Šešelj of the Serbian Radical Party, Borislav Pekić of the Democratic Party and ten other candidates. Šešelj's candidature was also supported by the Serbian National Renewal and Serb Democratic Party. The election resulted in Šešelj's victory, winning 80% of the popular vote in the second round of the election. He was sworn in to the National Assembly of Serbia on 8 July. In the following parliamentary election in 1992, his party went onto win 73 seats.

== Background ==
Following the 1990 Serbian constitutional referendum, a multi-party system was introduced in Serbia. This led to creation of the Socialist Party of Serbia (SPS), led by Slobodan Milošević, Democratic Party (DS), and Serbian Renewal Movement (SPO). Shortly after the new constitution was adopted, general elections were called for 9 December 1990. The elections resulted in a landslide victory of Milošević's SPS, winning 194 out of 250 seats in the National Assembly of Serbia. Among the candidates elected on the SPS list was Miodrag Bulatović in the constituency of Rakovica I. The first convocation of the National Assembly was constituted on 11 January 1991, while Bulatović was sworn in at a 16 January session. However, he died on 15 March and his seat became vacant. The by-election was called by Slobodan Unković, the president of the National Assembly, on 9 May.

== Electoral system ==
With the adoption of a new constitution in September 1990, a new electoral system was introduced in Serbia. The 250 members of the National Assembly of Serbia were elected using a first-past-the-post, two-round voting system from 250 single-member constituencies. A constituency's territory could consist of multiple local communities (mesna zajednica), populated places (naseljena mesta), or a single municipality. Eligible voters were able to vote for only one candidate in their respective constituency. A campaign for an election can last 30 to 90 days.

A candidate could be nominated by one or more political parties or other registered political organisations with at least 100 valid signatures from constituency residents, or by a citizens group (grupa građana) instead. A citizens' group, under the law enacted in 1990, is a group of 100 citizens bound by an agreement willing to take part in an election. The candidate was submitted to Republic Electoral Commission (RIK) by its proposer. RIK could deny a candidate, after which the deficiencies had to be corrected within 48 hours if the candidate was to be re-submitted again. The symbol of a constituency, the name of the election, and a list of candidates that ran in the constituency were present on the voting ballot. In the first round, a candidate was elected if at least 50% of the voters came out to vote, while in the second round the candidate with the most votes wins.

RIK, the local election commission, and polling boards of the constituency oversaw the election in the Rakovica I constituency. Parliamentary elections were called by the president of the National Assembly, who also had to announce their dates. To vote, a person had to be a citizen, able to perform working duties, and at least 18 years old. Voting also took place in hospitals, nursing homes, and police barracks. During the election day, eligible voters can vote from 07:00 (UTC+01:00) to 20:00 at a voting station in their constituency. Voters who were either blind, disabled, or illiterate can bring a relative to vote on their behalf at a voting station.

== Participants ==
The following list includes candidates who took part in the by-election.

- Radoš Karaklajić, nominated by SPS, an auto mechanic
- Vojislav Šešelj, nominated by the Serbian Radical Party (SRS), a lawyer
- Borislav Pekić, nominated by DS
- Jovan Marjanović, nominated by SPO–Serbian Liberal Party–New Democracy – Movement for Serbia
- Velizar Šešer, nominated by the League of Communists – Movement for Yugoslavia
- Strahinja Kostić, nominated by a citizens' group
- Miodrag Gojković, nominated by the Party of Independent Entrepreneurs and Peasants
- Jovan Čepić, nominated by the YU Bloc
- Predrag Vuletić, nominated by the Liberal Party
- Milosav Jovanović, nominated by the Workers' Party of Yugoslavia
- Milan Radojević, nominated by a citizens' group
- Miroslav Tijanić, nominated by a citizens' group
- Dušan Mikin, nominated by the Serbian Royalist Bloc

== Campaign ==
According to newspaper Borba, the election reflected "the current state of the government and opposition". Despite nominating its own candidate, Milošević's SPS backed Šešelj in the election by giving him election infrastructure. SPS, however, denied this. According to Borba, out of all candidates, most voters attended Šešelj's campaign events. During the campaign, Radio Television Belgrade presented Karaklajić, Pekić, and Marjanović on television. Šešelj was also scheduled to appear, however, he was denied entrance into the building because he was armed.

Šešelj campaigned by organising election events, while Pekić presented his campaign at literary evening events, pubs, and cafés. At one of his events, Pekić was joined by all DS members of parliament (MP). They presented Pekić as "a person with a clear political past" (čovek čiste političke prošlosti). Šešelj campaigned on promoting privatisation, opposition to Yugoslavism, and support for Greater Serbia. His candidacy was supported by the Serbian National Renewal and Serb Democratic Party. On 12 June, SPS organised an event promoting Karaklajić's candidature. The event was attended by SPS officials Borisav Jović and Jovan Striković.

== Results ==
The election was conducted at 19 voting stations. The results of the first round saw Šešelj winning 56% of the popular vote; he was followed by Karaklajić, who won 15% of the popular vote. In the early hours of the first round, about 20% of the voters voted in the election, while by the end of the day, the number of voters that turned out to vote rose up to 40%. After the election, DS objected to the electoral rules and filed a complaint to the local election commission, which eventually rejected their complaint. Considering that less than 50% of voters turned out to vote, the Election Commission called a second round for 30 June, featuring only Šešelj and Karaklajić as candidates. In the second round, Šešelj won 80% of the popular vote. According to Ivan Matić, the president of the local election commission, there were no complaints filed after the second round.

Candidate	Party	First round		Second round	
Candidate	Party	Votes	%	Votes	%
Vojislav Šešelj	Serbian Radical Party	6,117	56.16	6,686	80.08
Radoš Karaklajić	Socialist Party of Serbia	1,692	15.53	1,663	19.92
Borislav Pekić	Democratic Party	1,365	12.53		
Jovan Marjanović	SPO–SLS–ND	968	8.89		
Velizar Šešer	League of Communists – Movement for Yugoslavia	237	2.18		
Strahinja Kostić	Independent	230	2.11		
Miodrag Gojković	Party of Independent Entrepreneurs and Peasants	65	0.60		
Jovan Čepić	YU Bloc	62	0.57		
Predrag Vuletić	Liberal Party	50	0.46		
Milosav Jovanović	Workers' Party of Yugoslavia	39	0.36		
Milan Radojević	Independent	28	0.26		
Miroslav Tijanić	Independent	25	0.23		
Dušan Mikin	Serbian Royalist Bloc	15	0.14		
Total		10,893	100.00	8,349	100.00
Valid votes		10,893	97.24	8,349	97.61
Invalid/blank votes		309	2.76	204	2.39
Total votes		11,202	100.00	8,553	100.00
Registered voters/turnout		27,953	40.07	27,939	30.61
Source: Republic Electoral Commission

== Aftermath ==
After the election, Šešelj declared his victory as "the victory of the Serbian Radical Party and its economic, social, and political programme" (transl. pobeda Srpske radikalne stranke i njenog ekonomskog, socijalnog i političkog programa). Šešelj was sworn in as MP on 8 July. During his tenure in the National Assembly, he was known for engaging in physical fights with opposition politicians. In the 1992 Serbian general election, his party went onto win 73 seats in the National Assembly.
