= Liberalno demokratska stranka =

Liberalno demokratska stranka (English: Liberal Democratic Party) may refer to:

- Liberal Democratic Party (Bosnia and Herzegovina), a defunct political party in Bosnia and Herzegovina
- Liberal Democratic Party (Serbia, 1989), a defunct political party in Serbia
