= Nevade =

- Village
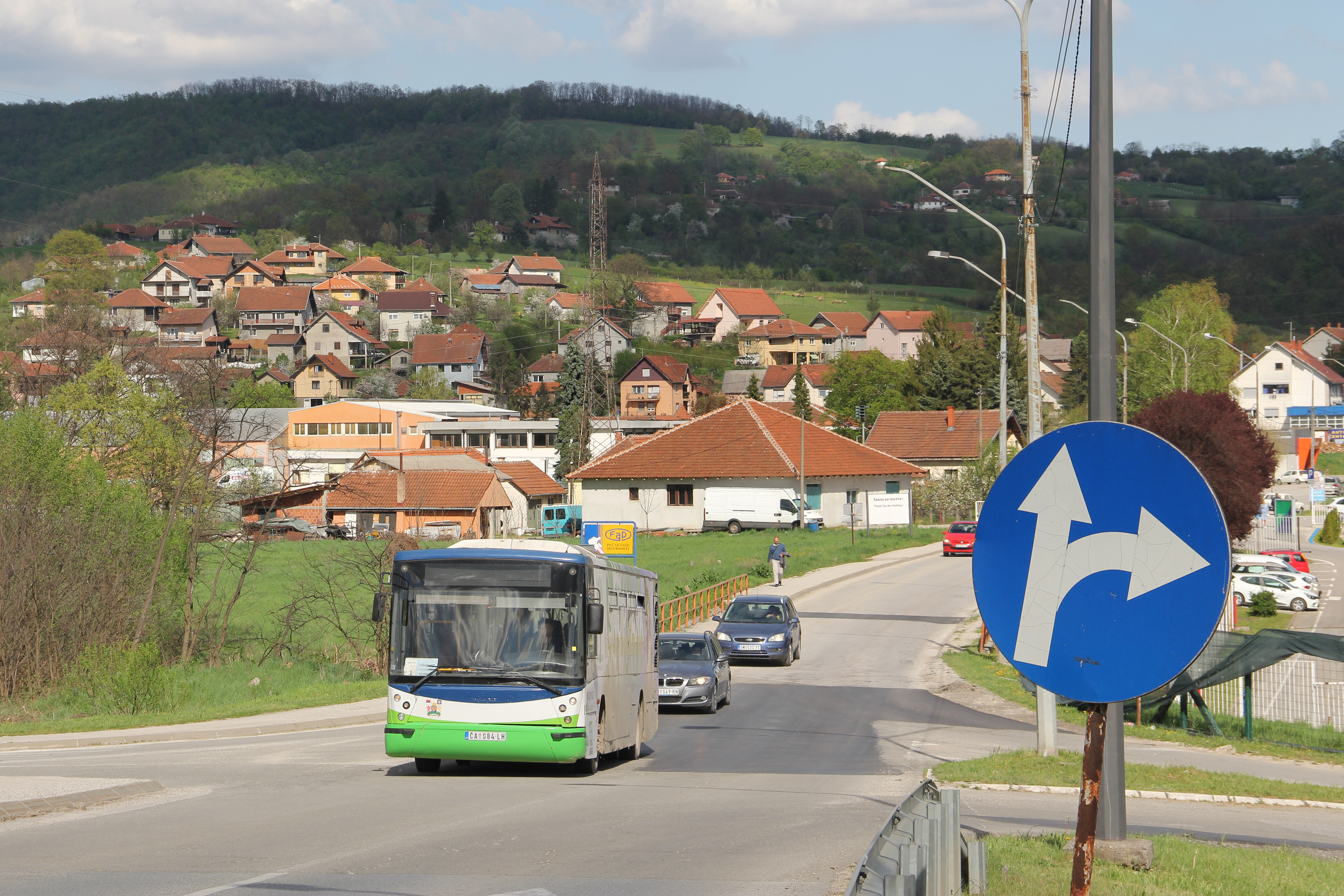
- Nevade Milanovca

- Location within Serbia
- Coordinates: 44°02′N 20°30′E
- Country: Serbia
- District: Moravica District
- Municipality: Gornji Milanovac

Area
  - Total: 8.34 km^{2} (3.22 sq mi)
- Elevation: 405 m (1,329 ft)

Population (2011)
  - Total: 627
  - Density: 75.2/km^{2} (195/sq mi)
- Time zone: UTC+1 (CET)
  - Summer (DST): UTC+2 (CEST)

Nevade is a village in the municipality of Gornji Milanovac, Serbia. At the 2011 census, the village had a population of 627 people.

The village was active in the Serbian Revolution, being organized into the knežina (administrative unit) of Brusnica (Takovo) during the First Serbian Uprising (1804–13). The revolutionary Petar Grk, the "drummer" (dobošar) of vojvoda Miloš Obrenović, came from the village. According to some sources, Hadži-Prodan Gligorijević was born in the village.

== Notable people ==
- Čedomir Mirković, Serbian writer and editor
