= Dušan Mihajlović =

Dušan Mihajlović may refer to:

- Dušan Mihajlović (footballer) (born 1985), Serbian football player
- Dušan Mihajlović (politician) (born 1948), Serbian politician
