= Đorđe Pavlović =

Serbian politician (born 1959)

Đorđe Pavlović (Serbian Cyrillic: Ђорђе Павловић; born 1959) is a Serbian former politician. He served in the Serbian parliament from 1993 to 1994 as a member of the far-right Serbian Radical Party (SRS).

== Private career ==
Pavlović is a surveyor. At the time of his election to the Serbian parliament, he lived in Priboj.

== Politician ==
Pavlović was the Radical Party's candidate for the Prijepolje division in the May 1992 Yugoslavian parliamentary election. He was narrowly defeated by Radojko Petrić of the Socialist Party of Serbia (SPS).

He later appeared in the second position on the Radical Party's electoral list for the Užice division in the 1992 Serbian parliamentary election and was elected when the list won eight seats. (From 1992 to 2000, Serbia's electoral law stipulated that one-third of parliamentary mandates would be assigned to candidates from successful lists in numerical order, while the remaining two-thirds would be distributed amongst other candidates at the discretion of the sponsoring parties. Pavlović was automatically elected by virtue of his list position.) He took his seat when the assembly convened in January 1993. In the assembly, he served on the committee on international relations.

The Socialist Party won a plurality victory in 1992 election and initially governed with unofficial support from the Radical Party. The alliance between the parties broke down later in 1993, however, and a new parliamentary election was called for December of that year. Pavlović appeared in the eighth position on the Radical Party's list for Užice and was not assigned a new mandate when the party fell to four seats in the division. His term ended in January 1994.

He was given the sixth position on the Radical Party's list for the smaller, redistributed Užice division in the 1997 Serbian parliamentary election and did not receive a mandate when the list won three seats.

== Electoral record ==
=== Federal (FR Yugoslavia) ===
May 1992 Yugoslavian federal election: Prijepolje
Candidate	Party	Votes	%
Radojko Petrić	Socialist Party of Serbia	23,398	35.33
Đorđe Pavlović	Serbian Radical Party	20,393	30.79
Miloš Vidaković	Citizens' Group	16,178	24.43
Milan Lučić	League of Communists – Movement for Yugoslavia	6,266	9.46
Total		66,235	100.00
