= Pecka (Osečina) =

Pecka Пецка
- Village (Selo)
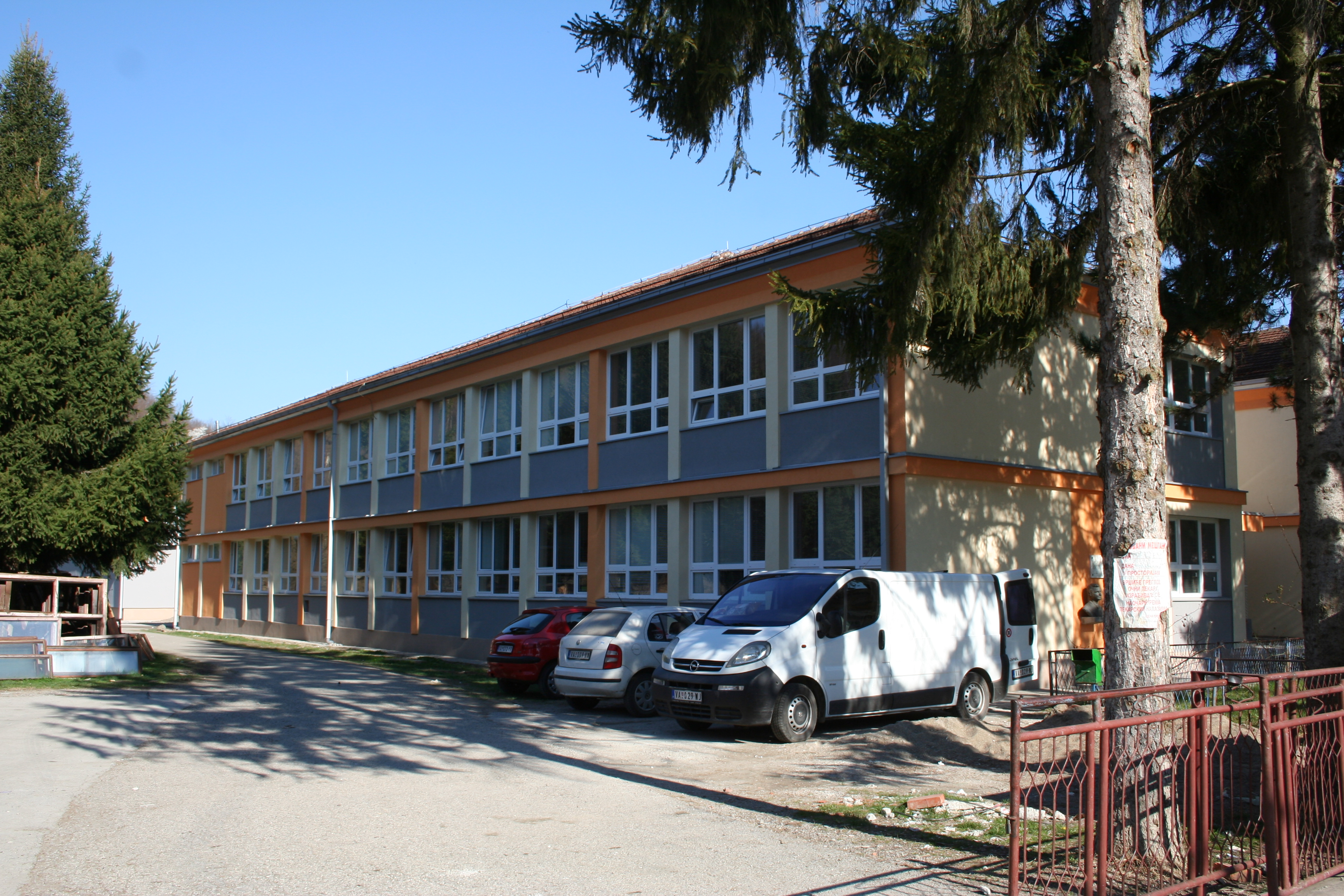

- Location within Serbia
- Coordinates: 44°02′00″N 20°59′00″E
- Country: Serbia
- Region: Šumadija and Western Serbia
- District: Kolubara
- Municipality: Osečina
- Elevation: 1,270 ft (387 m)

Population (2011)
  - Total: 451
- Time zone: UTC+1 (CET)
  - Summer (DST): UTC+2 (CEST)

Pecka is a village in the municipality of Osečina, Serbia. According to the 2011 census, the village has a population of 451 inhabitants.

== Population ==
Population of Pecka
1948	1953	1961	1971	1981	1991	2002	2011
214	216	276	285	429	469	501	451
