= Ministry of Human and Minority Rights (Serbia and Montenegro) =

The Ministry of Human and Minority Rights (Serbian Cyrillic: Министарство за људска и мањинска права, romanized: Ministarstvo za ljudska i manjinska prava) was a government ministry in the State Union of Serbia and Montenegro. It existed from 2003 to 2006, corresponding to the creation and disestablishment of the state union itself.

The ministry had previously existed in the Federal Republic of Yugoslavia from 1992 to 1994. On 15 September 1994, the incumbent minister was reassigned as a minister without portfolio, though still holding responsibility for human and minority rights; three years later, the position ceased to exist entirely. After the overthrow of Slobodan Milošević on 5 October 2000, the department was re-established in a modified form as the Ministry of National and Ethnic Communities.

== History ==
The ministry of human and minority rights was first established in the government of Yugoslavian prime minister Milan Panić in July 1992. Momčilo Grubač, a member the Reformist Democratic Party of Vojvodina (RDSV), was appointed as the first minister.

Panić resigned as prime minister in February 1993 and was replaced by Radoje Kontić. The following month, Margit Savović of the Socialist Party of Serbia (SPS) was appointed as the new minister of human and minority rights. This was a very controversial decision; an article in the newspaper Borba observed that Savović, herself an ethnic Hungarian, had a poor reputation with minority communities. This notwithstanding, she continued in the role for over a year and later held the basically the same responsibilities after being reassigned as a minister without portfolio on 15 September 1994. Savović was dropped from cabinet on 20 March 1997, and the position disappeared for the next three and a half years.

After the fall of Slobodan Milošević, a new Yugoslavian ministry comprising the Democratic Opposition of Serbia (DOS) and the Socialist People's Party of Montenegro (SNP CG) came to power on 4 November 2000 with Zoran Žižić as prime minister. Rasim Ljajić was appointed as the minister of national and ethnic communities. At the time, Ljajić was the leader of the Sandžak Coalition, which was soon restructured as the Sandžak Democratic Party (SDP), a part of the DOS coalition. He held the position for the next two-and-a-half years.

When the Federal Republic of Yugoslavia was restructured as the State Union of Serbia and Montenegro in early 2003, Ljajić was appointed as minister of human and minority rights, in effect a continuation of his previous role. The ministry had four divisions: the sector for human rights, the sector for minority policy, the sector for extradition and international legal assistance, and the sector for humanitarian issues and missing persons.

The state union dissolved in June 2006 after Montenegro declared independence, and the ministry ceased to exist.

== List of ministers ==
=== Federal Republic of Yugoslavia (1992–2003) ===
No.	Portrait	Minister	Took office	Left office	Time in office	Party
Minister of Human Rights and Minority Rights
1	Momčilo Grubač	Momčilo Grubač (24 March 1940–6 December 2015)	31 July 1992	2 March 1993	214 days	Reformist Democratic Party of Vojvodina
2	Margit Savović	Margit Savović (born 8 January 1952)	2 March 1993	15 September 1994	1 year, 197 days	SPS
Minister without Portfolio responsible for Human and Minority Rights
1	Margit Savović	Margit Savović (born 8 January 1952)	15 September 1994	20 March 1997	2 years, 186 days	SPS
Minister of National and Ethnic Communities
1	Rasim Ljajić	Rasim Ljajić (born 28 January 1964)	4 November 2000	7 March 2003	2 years, 123 days	Sandžak Democratic Party

=== Serbia and Montenegro (2003–2006) ===
No.	Portrait	Minister	Took office	Left office	Time in office	Party
Minister of Human and Minority Rights
1	Rasim Ljajić	Rasim Ljajić (born 28 January 1964)	17 March 2003	5 June 2006	3 years, 78 days	Sandžak Democratic Party
