= Margit Savović =

Serbian politician

Margit Savović (Serbian Cyrillic: Маргит Савовић; born 8 January 1952) is a Serbian former politician. She was a cabinet minister in the Federal Republic of Yugoslavia from 1993 to 1997, responsible for human rights and minority rights. She has also served in the parliaments of Serbia and the Federal Republic of Yugoslavia and was briefly part of the Vojvodina provincial government. A member of the Socialist Party of Serbia (SPS) for most of her career, Savović led her own Party of Successful Women (Partija uspešnih žena, PUŽ) in the early 2000s.

== Early life and private career ==
Savović was born in Békéscsaba, in what was then the Hungarian People's Republic, to an ethnically Hungarian family that had fled from Budapest. Both of her parents were communists; her father had worked in the ministry of defence, and her mother had been an assistant to László Rajk, who was executed in 1949 but posthumously rehabilitated in 1956. Savović moved to the Socialist Federal Republic of Yugoslavia at age twenty, settling in the town of Palić in the Subotica municipality. She holds a Ph.D. from the Faculty of Education in Subotica. Her Serbian last name "Savović" is from a former marriage.

Before her political career, Savović worked at the College of Professional Studies for Teacher Education in Subotica. Unable to return to this position when she left public life, she later taught at the Faculty of Education in Jagodina.

== Editor ==
Savović was appointed as editor of the Hungarian language newspaper Het Nap in 1990 by Radoman Božović, the chair of the executive council of Vojvodina. Her appointment was extremely unpopular with the paper's editorial staff, who went on strike shortly thereafter; the strikers demanded her resignation, which she in fact submitted on 17 October 1990. The Supreme Court of Vojvodina later annulled Savovic's appointment entirely, finding that there had been no public competition for the role and that the executive council had not documented her qualifications for the position.

== Politician ==
Serbian politics in the 1990s was dominated by the authoritarian rule of Slobodan Milošević, leader of the Socialist Party of Serbia.

=== Yugoslavian parliamentarian ===
The first elections for the Chamber of Citizens in the Federal Republic of Yugoslavia took place in May 1992. Half of the Serbian seats in the federal parliament were determined by first-past-the-post elections in single-member constituency seats, and the other half were determined by proportional representation. Savović appeared in the thirty-fourth position on the Socialist Party's electoral list and was given a mandate when the list won thirty-one proportional seats. (One-third of the "proportional" mandates were assigned to candidates on successful lists in numerical order, while the remaining two-thirds were assigned to other candidates at the discretion of the sponsoring parties or coalitions. Savović's relatively low position on the list did not prevent her election.) The Socialists won a majority victory overall, due in part to an opposition boycott.

Savović soon emerged as a prominent critic of Yugoslavian prime minister Milan Panić, who had been appointed earlier in the year with Milošević's blessing but afterward demonstrated an independent policy approach. In an assembly speech on 4 September 1992, Savović strongly criticized Panić's willingness to make concessions at the London Peace Conference on the ongoing Bosnian War. The following month, she urged the federal parliament to annul a recent agreement between Croatia and the Federal Republic of Yugoslavia on the removal of the Yugoslav Army personnel from the island of Prevlaka, against the backdrop of the Croatian War. In November, she supported an unsuccessful vote of non-confidence against Panić.

Due to ongoing concerns about the legitimacy of the May 1992 vote, a new Yugoslavian parliamentary election took place in December of the same year. Savović was not a candidate, and her term ended when the new parliament convened in February 1993.

=== Serbian parliamentarian ===
The 1992 Serbian parliamentary election, which took place concurrently with the December 1992 Yugoslavian vote, was the first republican election in Serbia held under proportional representation. The country was divided into nine electoral divisions; as per existing practice at the federal level, the first one-third of mandates were assigned to candidates on successful lists in numerical order and the remaining two-thirds at the discretion of the sponsoring parties. Savović appeared in the seventh position on the Socialist Party's list for the Zrenjanin division and was assigned a mandate when the list won eight seats. She took her seat when the assembly met in January 1993; in the assembly, she served on the committee for international relations and the committee for education, physical culture, and sports. The Socialists won a plurality victory overall and initially governed with informal support from the far-right Serbian Radical Party (SRS).

The Socialist–Radical alliance broke down later in 1993, and a new Serbian parliamentary election took place in December of that year. Savović was promoted to the sixth position on the Socialist Party's list for Zrenjanin. The list won ten seats in the division; on this occasion, however, she was not assigned a new mandate. Her term ended in January 1994.

=== Member of the Vojvodina executive ===
On 9 February 1993, Savović was appointed to the executive council of Vojvodina as part of Boško Perošević's first government, serving as secretary of national minorities, administration, and regulations. Her appointment was met with strong opposition from the Democratic Fellowship of Vojvodina Hungarians (VMDK), at the time the dominant political party within Vojvodina's Hungarian community. One of the VMDK's representatives, Andor Gazda, described Savović as having the same reputation among Hungarians that Vuk Branković had among Serbs; another representative described her appointment as a provocation toward minority communities.

Savović said that she would work to ensure minority communities had "equality in rights and obligations, with the normal possibility of expressing their specificities, such as cultivating language, culture, education, religion, information." She also said that no ethnic cleansing was taking place in the Federal Republic of Yugoslavia, remarking, "I asked a parliamentary question in the Yugoslav Parliament about it. The answer I received confirmed it."

She announced a visit to the village of Hrtkovci in late February 1993, due concerns over the large-scale emigration of Croats from the community. By the time the visit took place the following month, she had already been appointed to the federal cabinet. She reiterated her view that there was no ethnic cleansing "except in individual cases" and said that several Croats leaving the area had signed legal contracts to their homes with Serb refugees arriving from Croatia. Her claims were met with strong opposition from Vojvodina's Croat leadership, who noted that Croats in Hrtkovci were being intimidated into leaving.

Her term in the provincial executive was brief, ending on 30 March 1993 due to her appointment as a federal minister. Her successor was Pavel Domonji.

=== Yugoslavian cabinet minister ===
==== Minister of Human Rights and Minority Rights ====
Milan Panić stood down as Yugoslavian prime minister on 9 February 1993 and was succeeded by Radoje Kontić. Kontić, in turn, announced a new administration on 2 March 1993; Savović was included in the government as minister of human rights and minority rights. As before, her appointment was met with criticism. Assistant minister László Józsa resigned later in the month, accusing her of being "devoid of political and statesmanlike wisdom." Another assistant minister, Konstantin Obradović, resigned in April, saying, "[Savović's] attitude towards human rights and her understandings are fundamentally different from mine."

Savović was asked early in her ministerial term about the status of Kosovo; she responded that it was "an inalienable part of Serbia and Yugoslavia" and that "everything except that can be negotiated with the [Kosovo] Albanians." In the same period, she said that Serbia's Hungarian national minority already lived in an autonomous province (i.e., Vojvodina) and that any further concession to autonomy would amount to ghettoization. In the buildup to a proposed law on national minorities, she remarked, "there will definitely be no national councils, special statuses, personal, three-level or territorial autonomies, and especially no Kosovo republic."

In June 1993, Serbian Renewal Movement (SPO) leader Vuk Drašković and his wife Danica were arrested, beaten, and sent to a high-security prison following street protests in Belgrade. When asked about these events, Savović said, "We all witnessed that Vuk Drašković called for the violent overthrow of the government. [...] Whoever fights, must expect to be beaten himself." This statement prompted widespread opposition, including from the Committee for the Release of Vuk Drašković, which called for Savović to be removed from office. (Drašković and his wife were later released, following an international campaign.)

Savović announced the expiration of the Conference on Security and Co-operation in Europe (CSCE) mission to the Yugoslavia in July 1993, adding that the mission would not be renewed. In making this announcement, she said, "Despite our efforts to end the conflict as soon as possible, the international community and the CSCE do not respect this, and even continue with unjustified and unsubstantiated accusations of our country." This decision, too, was met with strong opposition, including from the Montenegrin government. A third assistant minister, Mahmut Memić, resigned the following month, citing Savović's "incompetent" work. Memić later said that, prior to his departure, "the work of that ministry was reduced to scheduling press conferences, at which the minister primarily tried to show off her new hairstyle and earrings, and then for the umpteenth time [...] to say that everything was fine in the field of human rights protection."

Savović sent an open letter to the director-general of UNESCO in October 1993 on the subject of Albanian language education rights. In the letter, she contended that the Kosovo Albanian community, alone among Yugoslavia's minority groups, was refusing to exercise its legitimate rights in the field of education for reasons that were "purely political in nature." She added that "the basis of all political disputes that exist between the authorities in Serbia and Albanian political leaders is their [...] long-standing persistence with the idea of Kosovo's secession from Serbia and Yugoslavia" and that "problems in education are only a reflection of this secessionist aspiration."

Leaders of the Bosniak (Muslim) community of Prijepolje complained in early 1994 that their community was facing organized state harassment in the form of mass house searches and arrests. Savović responded that "state authorities have checked these accusations and that they have been determined to be unfounded." Later in the year, Bela Tonković, leader of the Democratic Alliance of Croats in Vojvodina (DSHV), argued that state authorities had failed to respond to attacks on the Franciscan Church in Subotica (including a bomb explosion and anti-Croat graffiti), the intent of which was to intimidate Croats into leaving the area. Savović responded by condemning the "vandalism" against the church, saying that her ministry would take "all necessary measures within its jurisdiction," and encouraging Tonković "not to succumb to emotions and to express full trust in the competent state authorities." Tonković in turn responded, "it's not about emotions, but about justified concern about the ineffectiveness of state bodies."

==== Minister without Portfolio responsible for human rights and minority rights ====
Kontić's cabinet was reshuffled on 15 September 1994. The department of human and minority rights officially ceased to exist at this time, and Savović was redesignated as a minister without portfolio responsible for human and minority rights. She also oversaw the commission for relations with religious communities and the commission for cooperation with UNICEF. In March 1995, she criticized UNICEF for overseeing the whole territory of the former Socialist Federal Republic of Yugoslavia from its centre in Zagreb.

On 25 May 1995, Savović was given further responsibilities as chair of the commission for the improvement of the position of women. In addition, she served as chair of the commission for educational and cultural cooperation with foreign countries.

Savović was a frequent critic of Tadeusz Mazowiecki, who served from 1991 to 1995 as United Nations Special Rapporteur on the Situation of Human Rights in the Territory of the Former Yugoslavia, and whom she accused of bias against the Federal Republic of Yugoslavia. She complimented Mazowiecki's successor Elizabeth Rehn in April 1996, saying that, "unlike her predecessor," Rehn was "making great efforts to, on the one hand, collect all the data necessary for her report on the spot, and on the other, to be as objective as possible." This notwithstanding, she later criticized what she described as errors in Rehn's reporting, particularly on the subject of "the alleged violation of the rights of the Albanian national minority in Kosovo and Metohija."

Large numbers of Serb refugees arrived in the Republic of Serbia in August 1995, after the fall of the Republic of Serbian Krajina. Some of the refugees, in accordance with government policy, were settled in areas with predominantly non-Serb populations, including in Kosovo and Vojvodina. This led to criticism at the international level. Savović responded, "The territory of Serbia is unique and indivisible, and I don't think we need to explain or justify to anyone where we will accommodate 150,000 newly arrived people. To put it mildly, claims that the national structure of certain regions is to be changed are ridiculous."

Savović called in early 1996 for ethnic Albanians in Kosovo to transfer out of their "parallel" education system and into the Serbian state system, with the understanding that they would receive credit for time spent in the other system. This statement prompted some controversy. In September of the same year, she welcomed an agreement by Serbian president Slobodan Milošević and Kosovo Albanian leader Ibrahim Rugova intended to facilitate the return of Albanian students to Serbian schools.

In January 1997, Savović argued that Yugoslavia was facing a depopulation crisis, in which Serbs and some minority communities were trending toward a negative birth rate. She reviewed the government's strategy for increasing natural population growth.

=== Yugoslavian government official ===
Radoje Kontić introduced a new cabinet that did not include Savović on 20 March 1997. Although her ministerial term technically ended at this time, she continued to be a high-profile government representative, retaining her previous roles as chair of Yugoslavia's commission for cooperation with UNICEF and chair of its commission for the advancement of women. In June 1997, she released the document, "Yugoslav Action Plan for Children by the Year 2000."

During the 1999 NATO bombing of Yugoslavia, Savović frequently highlighted the disproportionate impact of the conflict on women and children. At an April 1999 press conference, she said, "Western propaganda has been showing only the so-called tragic images of Albanian refugees for years, without even mentioning how many refugees are fleeing towards the interior of Serbia. Most of them are women and children." On 22 May, she said that thirty-eight children had been killed in the Koriša bombing and a further assault on Surdulica, adding, "It seems that the fate of those who fled NATO bombs is more disturbing than the fate of those who remain underneath the rubble, for the dead do not cry." Savović later described NATO's attacks on schools as deliberate systemic destruction, rather than as "collateral damage."

On 12 July 1999, shortly after the end of the bombing campaign, Savović released a document entitled, "Women – Victims of Aggression." The document contended that women bore the heaviest burden of survival and maintaining families during the conflict; it also stated that women made up forty per cent of the 300,000 people made unemployed by the bombing and that 700,000 girls in primary and secondary schools in Vojvodina and Central Serbia had their education interrupted. Savović later said that up to forty per cent of the ten thousand people wounded in the bombing were children. In January 2000, she contended that the "so-called Kosovo Liberation Army" (KLA) had committed numerous terrorist acts in the first six months of the postwar United Nations Interim Administration Mission in Kosovo (UNMIK) administration, in which "793 people were killed, 61 were wounded, and 688 were abducted or disappeared, including a large number of children."

Savović's term in office ended soon after the overthrow of Slobodan Milošević on 5 October 2000.

=== Leader of the Party of Successful Women ===
Savović founded the Party of Successful Women in 2001. She intended to be a candidate in the September–October 2002 Serbian presidential election, though ultimately she did not appear on the ballot. The party later ceased to exist, having apparently never fielded any candidates in any election.

=== Public image ===
Savović became a celebrity during her time in politics, and Serbian media coverage often focused on aspects of her lifestyle and appearance, including her hairstyle and preference for wearing mini-skirts. She borrowed a handgun from the Yugoslavian ministry of the interior in 1995 and returned it in early 2001 after sensationalized media reports that she had taken up arms during her time in power; she clarified that she never actually used the gun, that it was never loaded, and that she had only carried it with her on two or three occasions. She later joked that Zoran Živković, the interior minister at the time she returned the weapon, was the only man who ever disarmed her. Savović continues to receive occasional coverage in Serbia's tabloid media.
