= Liberal Democratic Party (Serbia, 1989) =

Political party in Serbia

Liberal Democratic Party Либерално демократска странка
- Former name: Liberal Party
- Abbreviation: LS (until 1997); LDS (after 1997)
- President: Aleksandar Stefanović; (1989–1990); Predrag Vuletić; (1990–2010)
- Founded: 14 December 1989
- Registered: 15 August 1990
- Dissolved: 19 January 2010
- Split from: Socialist Alliance of Working People of Serbia
- Succeeded by: Serbian Monarchists
- Headquarters: Pantićeva 70, Valjevo; Njegoševa 1, Belgrade (until 2000); Mutapova 12, Belgrade (after 2000)
- Ideology: Liberalism; Monarchism; Agrarianism; Anti-communism
- Political position: Syncretic
- Colours: Blue; Grey
- Slogan: Za obnovu Monarhije – za obnovu sela; ("For the renewal of the monarchy – for the renewal of villages")

Website
- lds-serbia.org.yu (archived); lds-serbia.org.rs (archived)

The Liberal Democratic Party (Serbian: Либерално демократска странка, romanised: Liberalno demokratska stranka, abbr. LDS), known as the Liberal Party (Serbian: Либерална странка, romanised: Liberalna stranka, abbr. LS) until 1997, was a political party in Serbia. Founded in 1989, its first president was Aleksandar Stefanović. Stefanović left LS to join Vojislav Šešelj's Serbian Chetnik Movement in June 1990. He was then succeeded as president by Predrag Vuletić.

LS was opposed to Slobodan Milošević and his Socialist Party of Serbia and organised anti-government protests with other opposition parties in the 1990s. LS achieved its best result in parliamentary elections in 1990, and in all subsequent elections up to 1997, it received less than 1,000 votes. Vuletić also ran three times in presidential elections on behalf of the party, achieving his best result in the December 1997 election. LDS was a member of the Democratic Movement of Serbia and Alliance for Change opposition coalitions, the latter being the predecessor coalition of the Democratic Opposition of Serbia that toppled Milošević in 2000. In the 2000s, LDS contested four local elections, but did not gain any representation. Vuletić also offered Čedomir Jovanović, the founder of the Liberal Democratic Faction inside the Democratic Party, to take over the party in 2004, but Jovanović never responded and formed his Liberal Democratic Party instead. LDS was succeeded by the Serbian Monarchists association in January 2010. Vuletić joined the New Serbia political party in 2011.

A liberal party, LS was mostly ideologically focused on economic issues, favouring a free-market economy, privatisation, and agricultural development. It was also against nationalism, dissolution of Yugoslavia, and autonomism regarding Kosovo. The party was strongly anti-communist, favouring civic democracy instead, and supported the restoration of the monarchy and the lustration of former members of the League of Communists of Yugoslavia. It supported the accession of Serbia to the European Union and NATO and had ambitions to join the Liberal International.

== History ==
=== 1990s ===
The Liberal Party (LS) was founded on 14 December 1989, in Valjevo by former members of the Socialist Alliance of Working People of Serbia. Its founders included Aleksandar Stefanović, Predrag Vuletić, Slaven Batoćanin, and Milan Ulm. Stefanović was the first president. LS took part in an opposition meeting in February 1990 where parties presented their political programmes. Stefanović defected to Vojislav Šešelj's Serbian Chetnik Movement once it was formed on 18 June 1990. Vuletić then succeeded him as president of LS. It was registered as a political party on 15 August 1990.

LS was a member of the United Opposition of Serbia (UOS) opposition coalition. With the Democratic Party (DS), People's Radical Party (NRS), Serbian Renewal Movement (SPO), and Social Democratic Party of Yugoslavia, LS was one of the organisers of the 13 June 1990 opposition protest in Belgrade; Vuletić gave a speech during the protest, demanding that Slobodan Milošević, the president of Serbia and the Socialist Party of Serbia, would call early elections, improve electoral conditions, and adopt a new constitution after the first multi-party elections. A day later, LS expanded its presence to Novi Sad. LS was also an organiser of the 12 September protest with UOS. At the protest, LS demanded that the 1990 elections should be free and fair.

Vuletić was nominated by the party as its presidential candidate on 12 November. A day later, LS presented its programme on Radio Television of Belgrade. After the discussions about an election boycott intensified in mid-November, several opposition parties, including LS, proclaimed an election boycott on 23 November. The opposition demanded revisions to the election law, which included demands such as representation of the opposition in RIK and local commissions. By the end of the month, the government accepted their demands and the boycott was cancelled. In the presidential election, Vuletić won 5,019 votes, while his party won 7,235 votes in the parliamentary election.

LS was later one of the organisers of the 1991 protests in Belgrade and they contested the 1991 Rakovica I by-election. The party was also the founding member of the Democratic Movement of Serbia coalition in 1992. Despite this, LS contested the 1992 and 1993 elections alone. In the 1992 parliamentary election, LS contested the Belgrade constituency, where it presented 32 candidates, with Vuletić listed first. In the 1993 parliamentary election, LS contested the Belgrade constituency again, this time in a coalition with the Belgrade Party; Vuletić was not a candidate in the election. In both elections, LS was unsuccessful, winning only 632 and 275 votes, respectively.

During the 1996 local elections, LS was supportive of the opposition Together coalition. To avoid confusion between LS and the Serbian Liberal Party (SLS), LS changed its name to the Liberal Democratic Party (LDS) on 15 February 1997. Later that year, LDS contested the September 1997 general elections. In the parliamentary elections, LDS contested the Valjevo constituency and received 503 votes. Vuletić was also a candidate in the presidential elections; he won 11,463 votes. Vuletić, despite not publishing an election programme, said he was satisfied with the results. Early presidential elections were then called for December 1997 due to low turnout in the September 1997 elections. Vuletić officially became a candidate on 16 November. He campaigned with the slogan, "Come to your senses, Serbia. Vote for a Serb who was not a communist" (Osvesti se, Srbijo. Glasaj za Srbina koji nije bio komunista). Vuletić was featured on a television programme with Milan Milutinović, the presidential candidate of the SPS, who would also go on to become the president of Serbia, during which they presented their programmes. Vuletić placed last in the election, winning 21,353 votes in total.

LDS was later a member of the Alliance for Change, the predecessor coalition of the Democratic Opposition of Serbia (DOS) that toppled Milošević in the 2000 elections. LDS was an organiser of anti-government protests in Valjevo in February, September, and October 1999. During the protests in September and October, Vuletić was detained and called to answer the violations he committed due to not reporting the protests to the authorities. The newspaper Vreme reported that Vuletić claimed to be a member of DOS.

=== 2000s ===
Vuletić initially wanted to participate in the presidential election for September 2002 and he called DOS to back his candidacy up. By late August, LDS rescinded that Vuletić would take part in the election and endorsed Vojislav Koštunica of the Democratic Party of Serbia. LDS contested the September 2004 local elections in Barajevo and Valjevo, featuring 13 candidates in total. In Barajevo, it won 45 votes, and in Valjevo, it won 86 votes. In Valjevo, LDS nominated Vojislav Andrić as their mayoral candidate. The last elections LDS contested were the 2008 local elections; in Žagubica, LDS contested the elections alone and won 203 votes. In Valjevo, LDS contested as the Coalition for the Monarchy, which also included the NRS, People's Peasant Party, and the Ravna Gora Movement (RP), and won 265 votes.

After Čedomir Jovanović formed the Liberal Democratic Faction inside the DS in 2004, Vuletić objected to the formation of Jovanović's party as the Liberal Democratic Party (LDP) due to its similar name in English. Vuletić offered Jovanović to take over the LDS leadership only if he would support the restoration of the Serbian monarchy in return; Vuletić told the Glas javnosti newspaper in 2005 that Jovanović did not respond to his proposal. Vuletić submitted a request to the Ministry of Public Administration and Local Self-Government in November 2005 to reject LDP from being registered. LDP was eventually registered. Unlike for LDP, Vuletić did not object the registration of SLS due to its similarity.

A new law regarding the registration of political parties was adopted in July 2009. The new law offered already-registered parties the opportunity to re-register in the next six months. Instead of re-registering, LDS merged with RP to create the Serbian Monarchists (SM) association on 19 January 2010. LDS was formally deregistered on 16 April 2010. In 2011, Vuletić joined the New Serbia and remained its member until 2017. SM ceased to exist in 2015.

== Ideology and platform ==
The programme of LS was largely based on liberal principles and it perceived itself to be the continuation of the 19th century Liberal Party. LS stated that it was against nationalism, instead declaring itself to be a scientific positive and evolutionary party. Their goal was to "bring all people and nationalities together, advocate for freedoms and rights, [...] develop economic prosperity, and maintain and preserve cultural heritage" (zbližavanje naroda i narodnosti, zalaganje za slobodu i prava, [...] razvijanje ekonomskog prosperiteta, održavanje i očuvanje kulturnih znamenitosti).

Author Robert Thomas described LS as a hybrid party, stating that Stefanović wrote a book that praised Draža Mihailović, the leader of Chetniks during World War II, but also portrayed LS as "a party of the European left". LS was strongly anti-communist and anti-Marxist, opposing socialism and favouring civic democracy instead. They favoured the repeal of the Republic Day holiday. In Novi Sad, they proposed to rename the Marshal Tito Square to the Square of Serbian Soldiers. In March 1990, LS wanted to organise a fictional trial for Josip Broz Tito but eventually cancelled without a reason. In May 1990, the party wanted to rehabilitate Mihailović and to place a memorial plaque dedicated to him on Ravna Gora, but they were stopped by the police. Additionally, LS supported the restoration of the Serbian monarchy and wanted to organise a referendum on whether Serbia should remain a republic or become a parliamentary monarchy. They protested against the decision to not let the House of Karađorđević return to Serbia.

LS was mostly focused on issues related to the economy. Its economic programme was written by Zoran Popov, a professor at the Faculty of Economics of the University of Belgrade. The party favoured a Western-style free-market economy and privatisation. In the Europa World Year Book, LS is also listed as a party that favoured a free market economy. It had an in-depth plan, stating that generated social capital should be invested in housing construction, that small businesses, such as tourism and agriculture, should be publicly owned, that large enterprises should get transformed into public enterprises, while the rest should be privatised. Regarding taxation, LS supported establishing a system "based on the experiences of Western Europe" (po ugledu na iskustva Zapadne Evrope), favouring consumption taxes instead of production taxing. The party also supported higher salaries and benefits for police officers and shorter working hours.

Regarding the status of Yugoslavia, LS was opposed to its dissolution and wanted a "democratic federation" to be implemented instead of the confederal system, which was proposed by Slovenia and Croatia. It saw confederalism as unrealistic. The party proposed holding a referendum on the matter. LS supported Serb minority rights in other Yugoslav republics, as well as in other countries. Regarding Croatia, LS stated that both "[Serbs and Croats] must live in this area with the least amount of problems" ([Srbi i Hrvati] mora da žive na ovom prostoru i to sa najmanje problema). It favoured the creation of a Serb country inside Croatia, as opposed to a cultural autonomy. The party opposed the independence of Kosovo and the establishment of the Assembly of Kosovo, as it saw Kosovo as an integral part of Serbia. LS was opposed to autonomist principles and wanted to encourage settlement of other ethnicities in Kosovo to combat separatism.

According to its programme declarations, the party also supported regionalism, the lustration of former members of the League of Communists of Yugoslavia, and the accession of Serbia to the European Union and NATO. LS was against particracy. LS also favoured agrarian development, wanting to ensure better conditions for those who lived in rural parts and villages. The party was also in favour of creating a ministry of environmental protection. LS wanted the English language to be taught mandatory in schools.

In September 1991, Vuletić was present at the assembly of the Serb Democratic Party of Bosnia and Herzegovina. The party had ambitions to join the Liberal International.

== Organisation ==
LDS only had two presidents during its existence, this being Stefanović and Vuletić. According to its website from 2003, Vesna Prodanova and Slobodan Jončić served as vice-presidents of the party, while Zoran Bojković was the president of the Belgrade chapter of LDS.

LS had chapters in other Yugoslav constituent republics, except Slovenia and Macedonia, and presented its activities internationally in the Western Europe, United States, Canada, Australia. In Serbia, LS operated at two headquarters, one in Valjevo at Pantićeva 70 and one in Belgrade at Njegoševa 1. In 1997, its legal headquarters were moved from Valjevo to Belgrade. In 2000, its headquarters in Belgrade were moved to Mutapova 12. By November 2005, however, Glas javnosti reported that their headquarters in Belgrade were closed. By 2009, LDS claimed to have chapters in 50 municipalities. After the dissolution of LDS in 2010, their headquarters in Valjevo were legally occupied by its successor who illegally ran a café in the building that was owned by the local government. The association was moved out of the premises in March 2015. Regarding its membership, LS had 300 members based in Kragujevac in 1990.

The party used "for the renewal of the monarchy – for the renewal of villages" (za obnovu Monarhije – za obnovu sela) as its slogan.

=== List of presidents ===
#	President	Birth–Death	Term start	Term end
1	Aleksandar Stefanović	1953–	14 December 1989	18 June 1990
2	Predrag Vuletić	1952–	18 June 1990	19 January 2010

== Electoral performance ==
=== Parliamentary elections ===
National Assembly of Serbia
Year	Leader	Popular vote	% of popular vote	#	# of seats	Seat change	Coalition	Status	Ref.
1990	Predrag Vuletić	7,325	0.15%	▲22nd	0 / 250	0	–	Extra-parliamentary	
1992	Predrag Vuletić	632	0.01%	▼46th	0 / 250	0	–	Extra-parliamentary	
1993	Predrag Vuletić	275	0.01%	▲42nd	0 / 250	0	–	Extra-parliamentary	
1997	Predrag Vuletić	503	0.01%	▼44th	0 / 250	0	–	Extra-parliamentary	

=== Presidential elections ===
President of Serbia
Year	Candidate	1st round popular vote		% of popular vote	2nd round popular vote		% of popular vote	Notes	Ref.
1990	Predrag Vuletić	21st	5,019	0.10%	—N/a	—	—	–	
1992	Did not participate							–	
Sep 1997	Predrag Vuletić	11th	11,463	0.29%	—N/a	—	—	Election annulled due to low turnout	
Dec 1997	Predrag Vuletić	7th	21,353	0.57%	—N/a	—	—	–	
Sep–Oct 2002	Vojislav Koštunica	1st	1,123,420	31.56%	1st	1,991,947	63.38%	Supported Koštunica; election annulled due to low turnout	

=== Local elections ===
Date	Municipality	Popular vote	% of popular vote	#	# of seats	Seat change	Coalition	Status	Ref.
19 September 2004	Barajevo	45	0.65%	▲11th	0 / 33	0	–	Extra-parliamentary	
19 September 2004	Valjevo	86	0.27%	▲20th	0 / 51	0	–	Extra-parliamentary	
11 May 2008	Žagubica	203	2.55%	▲8th	0 / 33	0	–	Extra-parliamentary	
11 May 2008	Valjevo	265	0.55%	▲10th	0 / 51	0	–	Extra-parliamentary	
