= Dušan Mihajlović (politician) =

Serbian politician (born 1948)

- Душан Михајловић

Deputy Prime Minister of Serbia
- In office 25 January 2001 – 3 March 2004
- Prime Minister: Zoran Đinđić; Nebojša Čović (acting); Žarko Korać (acting); Zoran Živković

Minister of Internal Affairs
- In office 25 January 2001 – 3 March 2004
- Prime Minister: Zoran Đinđić; Nebojša Čović (acting); Žarko Korać (acting); Zoran Živković
- Preceded by: Slobodan Tomović; Božidar Prelević; Stevan Nikčević (as co-ministers)
- Succeeded by: Dragan Jočić

Personal details
- Born: 27 September 1948 (age 77) Valjevo, PR Serbia, FPR Yugoslavia
- Education: University of Belgrade Faculty of Law
- Occupation: Politician
- Profession: Lawyer

Dušan Mihajlović (born 27 September 1948) is a Serbian politician. He served as the Minister of Internal Affairs and as the Deputy Prime Minister of Serbia from 2001 to 2004.

== Early life and education ==
Mihajlović was born in Valjevo, FPR Yugoslavia on 27 September 1948. He earned a degree from the University of Belgrade's Law School.

== Political career ==
Dušan Mihajlović reconstituted Social Democratic Youth in New Democracy or Liberals of Serbia with its base in Valjevo, Serbia. He was elected as member of the National Assembly of Serbia between 1993 and 1999.

During the 2000 Federal Republic of Yugoslavia presidential election, he participated in the Democratic Opposition of Serbia. He served as Deputy Prime Minister and Minister of Interior in the 2001-2004 government. Mihajlović was the leader of the Liberals of Serbia party.

Government offices
Preceded by Spasoje Krunić	Deputy Prime Minister of Serbia; 2001–2004	Succeeded by Miroljub Labus
Preceded by Slobodan Tomović; Božidar Prelević; Stevan Nikčević (as co-ministers)	Minister of the Interior; 2001–2004	Succeeded by Dragan Jočić
