= Liberals of Serbia =

Former liberal political party in Serbia

Liberals of Serbia Либерали Србије
- Founder: Dušan Mihajlović
- Founded: 10 July 1990
- Dissolved: 13 April 2010
- Preceded by: League of Socialist Youth of Serbia
- Headquarters: Rajićeva 22, Belgrade
- Youth wing: Mladi Liberali Srbije
- Ideology: Liberalism; Pro-Europeanism; Atlanticism
- Political position: Centre to centre-left
- European affiliation: Alliance of Liberals and Democrats for Europe Party
- International affiliation: Liberal International
- Colours: Orange, Blue

Website
- liberali-srbije.org.yu

The Liberals of Serbia (Serbian: Либерали Србије, romanized: Liberali Srbije; abbr. ЛС, LS) was a political party in Serbia.

== History ==
The party was founded in 1990 when the Social Democratic Youth League reconstituted itself as Movement for Serbia – New Democracy. The party was renamed to just New Democracy in March 1993.

In the 1993 election, when the Socialist Party of Serbia lost its majority in parliament, New Democracy, which had previously belonged to the DEPOS, supported the socialists in gaining a parliamentary majority necessary to form a government, citing Milošević's commitment to securing a peace plan for Bosnia and Herzegovina. In 1998, New Democracy left the government and was replaced by the Serbian Radical Party.

In 2000, New Democracy was a part of the Democratic Opposition of Serbia (DOS) coalition, the candidate of which, Vojislav Koštunica, won the 2000 presidential elections. At the parliamentary election in the same year, the party was part of the same coalition and participated in the government which was formed by DOS. In 2003 the party was renamed Liberals of Serbia.

On 4 July 2003, Liberals of Serbia representative Rebeka Božović became deputy mayor of Belgrade. She served in this role until after the 2004 Serbian local elections.

At the parliamentary election on 28 December 2003 Liberals of Serbia put up as candidates the former Serbian Interior Minister Dušan Mihajlović and the former Chief of Serbian Police, General Sreten Lukić, the latter indicted for war crimes in the International Criminal Tribunal for the Former Yugoslavia. The party won 0.7% of the popular vote and no seats.

In October 2005 Mihajlović stepped down and Radivoje Lazarević, former Yugoslav ambassador to Brazil, took over as party president.

In 2010, acting president of the party, Miroslav Stefanović, was fined 150.000 RSD for falsely accusing Vladimir Beba Popović of being responsible for the assassination of Zoran Đinđić in 2007.

The party ceased to exist in 2010.

== Electoral performance ==
=== Parliamentary elections ===
Year	Popular vote	% of popular vote	# of seats	Seat change	Coalitions	Government
1992	797,831	16.89%	1 / 250	▲1	DEPOS	opposition
1993	715,564	16.64%	6 / 250	▲5	DEPOS	government
1997	1,418,036	34.26%	5 / 250	▼1	Left Coalition	opposition
2000	2,402,387	64.09%	9 / 250	▲4	DOS	government
2003	22,852	0.59%	0 / 250	▼9		non-parliamentary
2007	134,147	3.33%	0 / 250	Steady	With SPO–NSS	non-parliamentary

=== Federal elections ===
Year	Popular vote	% of popular vote	# of seats	Seat change	Coalitions	Government
1996	1,848,669	42.90%	3 / 250	▲3	Left Coalition	government (1997–1998) opposition (1998–2000)
2000	2,040,646 (Chamber of Citizens); 2,092,799 (Chamber of Republics)	42.88% (Chamber of Citizens); 43.98% (Chamber of Republics)	4 / 250	▲1	DOS	government

== See also ==
- Liberalism in Serbia
- Serbian Liberal Party
