= Lovas killings =

Massacre of Croatian civilians during the Croatian War of Independence

Coordinates: 45.225821°N 19.168965°E

- Lovas on the map of Croatia, JNA/Croatian Serb-held areas in late 1991 are highlighted in red
- Location: Lovas, Croatia
- Date: 10–18 October 1991
- Target: Croat civilians
- Attack type: Mass murder, ethnic cleansing
- Deaths: 70 (10–18 October 1991); 90 killed in total between October and November 1991
- Injuries: 32–33
- Perpetrators: SAO SBWS Territorial Defence Forces, the Yugoslav People's Army, Dušan the Mighty Forces.

The Lovas killings (Croatian: masakr u Lovasu, Serbian: zločini u Lovasu, злочини у Ловасу) involved the killing of 70 Croat civilian residents of the village of Lovas between 10 and 18 October 1991, during the Croatian War of Independence. The killings took place during and in the immediate aftermath of the occupation of the village by the Yugoslav People's Army (JNA) supported by Croatian Serb forces and Dušan the Mighty Forces. On 10 October, two days after Croatia declared independence from Yugoslavia. The occupation occurred during the Battle of Vukovar, as the JNA sought to consolidate its control over the area surrounding the city of Vukovar. The killings and abuse of the civilian population continued until 18 October, when troops guarding a group of civilians forced them to walk into a minefield at gunpoint and then opened fire upon them.

After the Croatian Serb forces, the JNA and the paramilitaries established their control in the village, the Croat population was required to wear white armbands and mark their houses using white sheets. The church in Lovas was torched and 261 houses were looted and destroyed, while 1,341 civilians were forced to leave their homes. The bodies of the victims were retrieved from a mass grave and ten individual graves in 1997. Lovas was rebuilt after the war, but its population size shrank by one third compared to its pre-war level.

The occupation of Lovas and the killing and expulsion of its civilian population was included in the International Criminal Tribunal for the former Yugoslavia (ICTY) indictments of the President of Serbia, Slobodan Milošević, and Goran Hadžić, a high-ranking official of the Croatian Serb-declared wartime breakaway region of SAO Eastern Slavonia, Baranja and Western Syrmia. Both Milošević and Hadžić died before their trials could be completed. Serbian authorities tried and convicted a group of four for the killings, but a retrial was ordered following an appeal in 2014. Croatia indicted 17 persons in connection with the killings, although only two were available to the authorities. One of them was acquitted and the other declared unfit to stand trial.

== Background ==
Map of eastern Slavonia area between Osijek and Vukovar (Modern county lines provided for reference)

After the Croatian Democratic Union won 1990 parliamentary elections in the Socialist Republic of Croatia, ethnic tensions between Croats and Serbs within the Republic worsened. The ethnic groups are also divided along religious lines as the Croats are Catholics while the Serbs are Orthodox Christians. The Yugoslav People's Army (Jugoslovenska Narodna Armija – JNA) confiscated the weapons of Croatia's Territorial Defence (Teritorijalna obrana – TO) forces to minimize resistance. On 17 August, tensions escalated into an open revolt by Croatian Serbs, centred on the predominantly Serb-populated areas of the Dalmatian hinterland around Knin, and parts of the Lika, Kordun, Banovina and eastern Croatia. This revolt was followed in January 1991, by two unsuccessful attempts by Serbia, supported by Montenegro and Serbia's provinces of Vojvodina and Kosovo, to obtain the Yugoslav Presidency's approval for a JNA operation to disarm Croatian security forces.

After a bloodless skirmish between Serb insurgents and Croatian special police in March, the JNA itself, supported by Serbia and its allies, asked the Federal Presidency to give it wartime authorities and declare a state of emergency. The request was denied on 15 March, and in consequence, Serbia abandoned the goal of a more centralised Yugoslavia for that of the Greater Serbia. The leadership of the JNA, fragmented between supporters of the federal government of Ante Marković and others aligned with Serbia since the breakup of the League of Communists of Yugoslavia in 1990, came under the control of Serbian President Slobodan Milošević. The control shifted after Milošević publicly declared that he no longer recognized the authority of the Federal Presidency and planned to establish a Serbian army which would draw JNA's Serbian personnel to the new force. The initial objective of the JNA, that of Yugoslav unity, was either abandoned or sought through support for Milošević. Even though he preferred a campaign to expand Serbia rather than to preserve Yugoslavia, the JNA equated protecting Serbs in Croatia with preservation of Yugoslavia. By summer, Milošević had the JNA under full control through his control of the rump Federal Presidency and his influence over the federal defence minister and top-ranked JNA officer, General of the Army Veljko Kadijević and JNA chief of staff, Colonel General Blagoje Adžić.

By the end of March, the conflict had escalated into the Croatian War of Independence. The JNA stepped in, increasingly supporting the Croatian Serb insurgents and preventing Croatian police from intervening. In early April, the leaders of the Croatian Serb revolt declared their intention to integrate the area under their control, known as SAO Krajina, with Serbia. The Government of Croatia viewed this declaration as an attempt to secede.

In May, the Croatian government responded by forming the Croatian National Guard (Zbor narodne garde – ZNG), but its development was hampered by a United Nations (UN) arms embargo introduced in September. On 8 October, Croatia declared independence from Yugoslavia. Late 1991 saw the fiercest fighting of the war, as the 1991 Yugoslav campaign in Croatia culminated in the Siege of Dubrovnik, and the Battle of Vukovar.

== Timeline ==
Armed clashes in eastern Slavonia gradually intensified as the JNA committed significant new units to the Battle of Vukovar, including the 453rd Mechanised Brigade, the 1st Proletarian Guards Mechanised Division, and the 252nd Armoured Brigade. During the initial stage of the battle, the JNA bypassed a number of Croat villages southeast of the city of Vukovar—including Lovas. In late September 1991, the easternmost Croatian positions in the area ran along a line connecting the villages of Nijemci–Ilača–Lovas and those were defended by the 2nd Battalion of the 3rd Guards Brigade and the 109th Infantry Brigade.

On 1 October, after the JNA took control of the Nuštar–Marinci–Bogdanovci–Vukovar road, the 2nd Battalion of the 3rd Guards Brigade and the 109th Infantry Brigade were moved south of Vukovar in an attempt to restore Croatian control of the route between Vinkovci and Vukovar. The JNA tasked the 2nd Proletarian Guards Mechanised Brigade, to clear the Croatian pocket centered on Lovas. The JNA was supported by Dušan Silni Serbian paramilitaries under control of Dragoslav Bokan and the Serbian National Renewal party, as well as Croatian Serb TO forces.

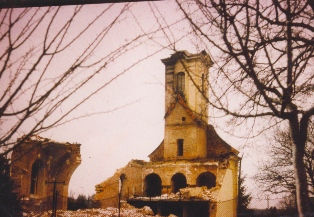
Destroyed church in Lovas, October 1991

The JNA, supported by the paramilitaries and the TO, entered Lovas unopposed on the morning of 10 October. According to court testimony of one of the paramilitaries who took part in the events, the troops moving against Lovas were told to expect 300–400 ZNG troops defending the village. Once the attacking force entered the village, the troops continued to throw grenades and shoot at houses at random for several hours. During the assault, 22 civilians were killed in their homes or back yards. In the immediate aftermath of the takeover of Lovas, Croat civilians were required to wear white armbands and their houses were marked using white sheets. The marked houses were looted and torched by the TO and paramilitaries. Authority in the village was turned over to Ljuban Devetak, a member of the Dušan Silni paramilitaries. He was styled as the commander of the village, but the JNA remained in overall control of the entire region. Over the following week, 23 more civilians were killed by the paramilitaries and the TO troops in improvised detention facilities. The improvised prisons were also used for torture and abuse of captives, including war rape, causing serious injuries to 18 civilians.

On 17 October, all men aged 18 to 60 were ordered to report for a meeting, but were detained overnight instead on the pretext that someone had fired shots in the village the previous night. The detainees were beaten, and otherwise abused that night. Approximately 20 were released in the morning, and the rest were told that they were assigned to grape harvest duty. The civilians walked out of the village under a military escort. One of the civilians was killed by the guards, before the group reached a point within 1 to 2 kilometres (0.62 to 1.24 miles) of the Vukovar–Tovarnik road, where they were ordered into a cloverfield at gunpoint. The men were told to hold hands and sweep their feet in front of them across the ground. The JNA had previously placed land mines in the field. Several mines were set off, while the troops guarding the civilian detainees fired at the men in the field. The survivors were then forced to retrieve the dead and injured and clear the remaining mines. Out of 50 civilians forced into the minefield, 21 were killed in the minefield itself. The number of persons wounded by mine explosions or gunfire is variously reported as 14 or 15. Between 17 October and 3 November, Serb forces killed an additional 28 civilians. Three more civilians were killed in Lovas by the end of November. Between October and November 1991, some 90 Croat and other non-Serb civilians had been killed by Serb forces, or had disappeared.

== Aftermath ==
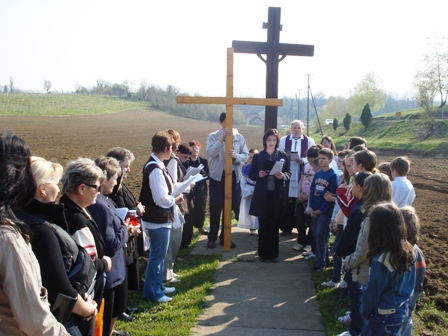
Memorial service held at the site of the former minefield

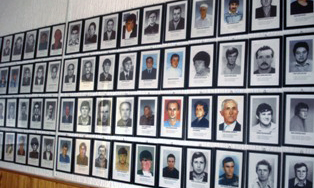
Photos of victims of the Lovas killings

In the immediate aftermath of the takeover of the village by the JNA and the paramilitaries, 1,341 civilians were forced to leave Lovas. The local Roman Catholic church of St. Michael was torched and 261 houses destroyed. In 1995, the establishment of the United Nations Transitional Administration for Eastern Slavonia, Baranja and Western Sirmium (UNTAES) and the gradual restoration of Croatian control in the region was agreed between Croatian authorities and Croatian Serbs in the region through the Erdut Agreement. United Nations experts began exhuming victims from a mass grave in Lovas on 2 June 1997. Sixty-eight bodies, including those of people killed in Lovas, were ultimately recovered from the mass grave, and ten more were recovered from nearby individual graves. The exhumed victims were reburied on 21 March 1998. A monument to the civilian victims was erected at the site of the mass grave on 27 May 1999, as was a cross to mark the location of the minefield. Another mass grave containing the bodies of six individuals was discovered in nearby Jelaš Forest, along with three individual graves. Similar to the other burial sites, the victims buried there included those killed in Lovas, as well as others, killed elsewhere in the area. Lovas was rebuilt after the war, but its population declined by one third compared to the pre-war level.

The International Criminal Tribunal for the former Yugoslavia (ICTY) included war crimes against civilians and property committed in Lovas in October 1991 in its indictment of Milošević. Milošević's trial commenced on 12 February 2002, but Milošević died in March 2006 before a verdict could be reached.

In 1994 and 2004 Croatian authorities filed two separate cases against a total of 17 persons, including Devetak, and indicted them on charges of genocide and war crimes committed against the civilian population of Lovas. The group included fifteen who were tried in absentia. In 2009, the process was split for Milan Tepavac and Ilija Vorkapić who were available to Croatian authorities, and once more a year later when Tepavac was judged not fit to stand trial. Vorkapić was acquitted in 2012.

Serbian authorities charged four persons associated with former Croatian Serb authorities in the eastern Slavonia with war crimes committed in Lovas, consisting of four JNA officers and six former members of the Dušan Silni paramilitaries. The trial started in 2008. In 2012, the group was convicted of killing of 70 Croat civilians and sentenced to a total of 128 years in prison. Devetak received a prison term of 20 years, while the others received prison sentences ranging from four to fourteen years. However, in 2014, the court of appeals ordered a new trial.

The ICTY also indicted Goran Hadžić, the Croatian Serb political leader in the eastern Slavonia region and head of the SAO Eastern Slavonia, Baranja and Western Syrmia government declared by the Croatian Serbs in the region at the time before it merged into the Republic of Serbian Krajina. The charges include war crimes of persecutions, extermination, murder, imprisonment, torture, inhumane acts and cruel treatment, deportation, forcible transfer of population, wanton destruction and plunder of property. Hadžić died in July 2016, before his trial could be completed.

== See also ==
- List of massacres in Croatia
