= Ivan Burik =

Servant of God Ivan Burik
- Church: Roman Catholic
- Archdiocese: Đakovo-Osijek

Orders
- Ordination: 6 March 1960

Personal details
- Born: November 8, 1928 Neštin, Kingdom of Yugoslavia
- Died: October 8, 1991 (aged 62) Tovarnik, Croatia
- Denomination: Catholic
- Occupation: Catholic priest
- Education: Faculty of Catholic Theology in Đakovo

Sainthood
- Title as Saint: Servant of God

Ivan Burik (8 November 1928 – 8 October 1991) was a Croatian Roman Catholic priest of the Archdiocese of Đakovo-Osijek killed during the Croatian War of Independence, murdered by Serb rebels, in the aftermath of the Tovarnik massacre. He was declared a Servant of God by Pope Francis in May 2016.

== Biography ==
=== Childhood ===
Burik was born in Neštin near Ilok in 1928. Due to his family's poor financial situation, he started working as a scribe after finishing six grades of the public school. When the Banovina of Croatia was founded, Ivan's father was active in the local Croatian Peasants' Party (HSS) organization. After the outbreak of the Second World War, he was appointed as the local chief. In 1943, he was killed by Yugoslav partisans. For the sake of safety, in 1943, Ivan escaped with his mother and brother to Ilok, and at the end of the war in 1944, because of the fighting at the Syrmian Front, they continued to Strizivojna, then to Vinkovci. On April 12, 1945, his family found themselves in a column of Croatian refugees fleeing from partisan forces. Ivan's family reached Bleiburg, where English soldiers stopped them. They arrived in Maribor and from there they went on their way, not like the other returning groups and thus escaped the fate of those in the Bleiburg massacre. They arrived in Strizivojna, where they stayed to live.

=== Education ===
Due to poverty and the family's loss of property during the war, he had to be a shepherd until 1948. In 1950, he was called up for military service. Upon his return, he briefly managed to get a job as an official in the local community. He was then sent to further education as a statistician in Zagreb. He briefly worked as a statistician, among others in Đakovo, where he befriended Đakovo priests and theologians, which is why he lost his job. He privately finished high school at Šalata in Zagreb. In his mature years, he enrolled and completed theology studies in Đakovo.(hr)

=== Priesthood ===
He was ordained a priest on March 6, 1960. In Đakovo, he was a chaplain in the local parish for the next three years. In the branches in the immediate vicinity of the city, he built the first catechetical halls and arranged sacristies, preparing them to become independent parishes (today the parishes of Viškovci, Đakovačka Satnica and Đakovački Selci).

He was a priest in Tovarnik since July 1, 1963. The village still felt the consequences of World War II and post-war communist repression. He gradually restored neglected parish buildings and parish communities, arranging the old church and a new parsonage next to it, and by holding catechesis. As he helped the Catholics, he also helped the Orthodox population of Tovarnik.

==== War and death ====
He concelebrated on July 21, 1991, at the First Mass of Tovarnik's deacon Grga Grbešić. In the war year of 1991, he did not leave Tovarnik. Instead, he helped in the evacuation of parishioners. Once, under pressure from the aggressor, he had to temporarily move to Vojvodina, in Sot. He stayed with his friend Rev. Petar Šokčević, but by order of the occupation authorities he had to return to Tovarnik every day and report to their militia. The last time he went from Sot to occupied Tovarnik was on October 7, 1991. He was shot from behind in the basement of the clergy house by a member of the Dušan Silni Serbian paramilitary unit, a murderer from Vršac. The killer later bragged in Lovas that he had "killed the Ustasha priest", parading around for days with Burik's priest's beret on his head.

Burik was killed together with the locals in a mass slaughter on September 22. The remaining Croats in Tovarnik, mostly old men and women, had to wear white ribbons. For a long time it was believed that Burik was killed that September 22. The coroner's report falsified conditions of the murder, because the analysis later showed bullet holes in the chest. The coroner's report was signed by Ljeposava Stanimirović. Although he was killed like other locals with firearms and/or cold weapons, in official documents she and Dr. Dragan Martinović wrote that Burik and the others "died from the explosion".

He was exhumed from a mass grave and buried in the local cemetery on January 31, 1998, with his parishioners.

== Trials ==
Fourteen Serbs were tried for Burik's murder. Three were charged with armed rebellion, four were acquitted due to lack of evidence, and the rest received sentences ranging from five to ten years.

== Remembrance ==
Jakov Sedlar directed a documentary on his life, entitled "Mučenik – vlč. Ivan Burik" (Martyr - Rev. Ivan Burik), which premiered in Đakovo in 2009.

In 2009, the Croatian writer Nevenka Nekić (hr) published a biographical novel Burik. In 2013, Sonja Tomić wrote an illustrated book Zvjezdana vrata ("Stargate") on his life and martyrdom.

Since 2009, the Vukovar - Tovarnik Memorial Race has been held in his memory.

== Literature ==
- Nekić, Nevenka, ed. (October 2011). Zbornik: Znanstveno-stručni skup Vlč. Ivan Burik - svjedok vjere, mučenik crkve: stradanje Tovarnika i tovarničke župe 1991. godine [Proceedings: Scientific and professional conference Rev. Ivan Burik - witness of faith, martyr of the church: the martyrdom of Tovarnik and Tovarnik parish in 1991]. Rev. Ivan Burik - witness of faith, martyr of the church: the martyrdom of Tovarnik and Tovarnik parish in 1991; October 7, 2009 (in Croatian). Tovarnik: Udruga dr. Ante Starčević. ISBN 978-953-55882-2-1.
