= Josip Reihl-Kir =

Croatian police chief (1955–1991)

- Born: Josip Tvrtko Reihl-Kir; 25 July 1955; Sirač, PR Croatia, Yugoslavia
- Died: 1 July 1991 (aged 35); Osijek, Croatia
- Occupation: Policeman
- Spouse: Jadranka Reihl-Kir

Josip Tvrtko Reihl-Kir (25 July 1955 – 1 July 1991) was a Croatian police chief from Osijek known for his peacemaking initiatives in the opening stages of the Croatian War of Independence. He was assassinated in 1991; the man convicted of his murder, and the murder of two assembly members, was sentenced to a total of 70 years in prison in 2008, after being extradited to Croatia from Australia.

== Early life ==
Josip Tvrtko Reihl-Kir was born in Sirač in the PR Croatia of the FPR Yugoslavia, the son of a Slavonian German (Danube Swabian) father and a Croatian mother, both Yugoslav Partisans during the World War II in Yugoslavia. He worked as a teacher at the gymnasium in Osijek, and in 1981 became a police officer. From 31 July 1990 until his death, he was chief of the Osijek police station. He married Jadranka Reihl-Kir, who between 2000 and 2003, whilst she was a Croatian MP, campaigned for his death to be re-investigated.

== Role in the Croatian War of Independence ==
The border between Croatia and Serbia was the site of significant ethnic tension after war broke out in 1991. As the police chief in Osijek, Reihl-Kir managed to keep the peace in that area. When Serbian nationalists erected barricades, Reihl-Kir usually went unarmed to negotiate with them. He would approach barricades with his shirt pulled up above his waist to show that he had no weapons on him. Reihl-Kir offered to keep Croatian paramilitary forces outside of areas inhabited by ethnic Serbs, and in return, he asked Serb leaders to remove the barricades surrounding those locations. The Serbs always agreed as they trusted Reihl-Kir. To ensure that the agreement was kept, Croatian paramilitary forces were infiltrated by Reihl-Kir's agents. This brought Reihl-Kir in conflict with Branimir Glavaš who had organized Croatian nationalists in the region.

In April 1991, a group of three senior members of the ruling Croatian Democratic Union (HDZ), including Gojko Šušak, told Reihl-Kir to guide them to the outskirts of the Croatian Serb village of Borovo Selo. Although Reihl-Kir initially objected, he finally agreed to do so. To Reihl-Kir's shock, once at the village, the three men proceeded to fire three Armbrust rockets at the village. Although there were no injuries or deaths, the incident was shown on Serbian television as evidence of "unprovoked Croatian aggression against Serbs". After the incident, Reihl-Kir continued negotiations with Serb separatists to the annoyance of the ruling HDZ.

On 1 May 1991, following an incident where Croatian policemen entered Borovo Selo, Reihl-Kir became involved when he contacted Vukašin Šoškoćanin, the commander of the Serb forces in the village, who confirmed the incident and said the police had shot at members of the local population, wounding one. Reihl-Kir failed to secure the release of two officers who were captured following the incident. Reihl-Kir and Vinkovci police chief Josip Džaja concluded that a rescue party should be sent to Borovo Selo. Following this, the Battle of Borovo Selo took place, Reihl-Kir openly protested HDZ politicians' obstruction of his efforts to broker peace between the two sides. SAO Eastern Slavonia, Baranja and Western Syrmia was proclaimed on 25 June 1991.

== Assassination ==
After threats had been made to his life, Reihl-Kir asked the Minister of Internal Affairs Josip Boljkovac to transfer him "anywhere else". Boljkovac agreed to move Reihl-Kir to the capital, Zagreb. On 1 July 1991, Reihl-Kir was assassinated the day before he was due to be transferred. In Tenja, as he was heading to 'one last' negotiation, his car was fired on by an AK-47, 16 bullets hit Reihl-Kir, killing him instantly. Following the assassination, the suspected killer Antun Gudelj, a former policeman with dual Australian–Croatian nationality, fled to Australia. Gudelj was a Croatian extremist who had been disarmed by Reihl-Kir shortly before.

Reihl-Kir's widow, Jadranka, lobbied vigorously for justice for her husband. In 2007, Australia extradited Gudelj to Croatia for the murders of Reihl-Kir and two associates, Milan Knežević and Goran Zobundžija, in Tenja in 1991. The first trial resulted in an acquittal, and a second trial verdict was overturned by the country's Supreme Court. At a third trial in 2008, Gudelj was sentenced to 20 years in prison for the murder of Reihl-Kir, and a further 50 years in prison for the murders of Knežević, Zobundžija and a charge of wounding.

== Legacy ==
Reihl-Kir's actions and murder are described in the BBC book The Death of Yugoslavia and covered in programme 3 of BBC's TV series of the same name. The street in Osijek, where he was killed, bears his name. A documentary film about Riehl-Kir's role in the prelude to the war and his assassination, entitled Peacemaker and directed by Ivan Ramljak, won the Big Golden Arena for Best Film at the 72nd Pula Film Festival in 2025; it also won the Golden Arena for Best Film Editing for Damir Čučić.

== Sources ==
- Hockenos, Paul (2003). Homeland Calling: Exile Patriotism & the Balkan Wars. Ithaca, New York: Cornell University Press. ISBN 9780801441585.
- "Memorijal 12 redarstvenika, 2008" [12 Constables Memorial, 2008] (in Croatian). Ministry of the Interior (Croatia). 2008. Archived from the original on 25 September 2013.
- Berclaz, Tanja Simić (22 July 2010). "Ko je tebi Reihl Kir?". Vreme. 1020.
