= Dušan the Mighty (paramilitary) =

Paramilitary unit in Yugoslav Wars

- Душан Силни; Dušan Silni
- Active: 1991
- Allegiance: SFR Yugoslavia; SAO Krajina
- Branch: Army
- Type: Paramilitary
- Engagements: Croatian War of Independence; Battle of Borovo Selo; Lovas killings; Tovarnik massacre

Commanders
- Notable commanders: Mirko Jović

Dušan the Mighty (Serbian: Душан Силни / Dušan Silni) was a Serbian paramilitary force that was active in the Croatian War of Independence in 1991. It was the armed wing of the Serbian National Renewal political party, led by Mirko Jović. The unit cooperated with the White Eagles and Serbian Chetnik Movement paramilitary groups and with SAO Krajina forces. It was present in the Battle of Borovo Selo, where twelve Croatian policemen were killed, and the Lovas killings, where members of Dušan the Mighty force and Yugoslav People's Army killed 70 civilians. Due to their involvement in Lovas, its members were later charged with war crimes by the Serbian Public Prosecutor's Office for War Crimes.

== History ==
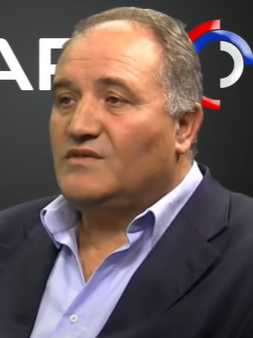
Serbian National Renewal, led by Mirko Jović (pictured), created the paramilitary force

Dušan the Mighty paramilitary force was created by members of the Serbian National Renewal (SNO) political party, which was led by Mirko Jović. The paramilitary was named after Stefan Dušan, a 14th-century king. The paramilitary was active in the Slavonia region during the Croatian War of Independence in 1991, where it cooperated with the White Eagles paramilitary unit and the SAO Krajina forces. The unit was armed and controlled by the State Security Directorate of Serbia. It has been described as a nationalist paramilitary.

The paramilitary was first active in the Battle of Borovo Selo in May 1991. In the predominantly Serb settlement, they were also joined by the Serbian Chetnik Movement, the paramilitary unit of the Serbian Radical Party, who were invited by local militia commander Vukašin Šoškoćanin. On 1 May 1991, four Croatian policemen entered Borovo Selo in an unauthorised attempt to replace the flag of Yugoslavia in the village with a flag of Croatia. This resulted in an armed clash in which two of them were injured and two taken prisoner by Serb paramilitaries. Subsequently, a larger Croatian police force entered the village, but were ambushed, and as a result, twelve policemen were killed. The fighting lasted until the Yugoslav People's Army (JNA) intervened on 2 May.

In September 1991, the paramilitary participated in the Tovarnik massacre. In October 1991, Dušan the Mighty paramilitary was stationed in Lovas. It entered the village on 10 October with the help of JNA. There, Ljuban Devetak, a member of the Dušan the Mighty paramilitary, was styled as the commander of the village. Together, they looted and burnt houses and tortured civilians. They also staged the Lovas killings, in which 70 civilians were murdered in October and November 1991. In the aftermath of the killings, over 1,341 civilians were forced to leave Lovas, a Roman Catholic church was burnt down, and 261 houses were destroyed by paramilitary forces and JNA.

In November 1991, a peace plan was negotiated between Serbia and Croatia to implement a ceasefire and withdraw JNA forces from Croatia. During the negotiations, SNO decided to back Milan Babić, the president of the Republic of Serbian Krajina, who opposed the agreement and accused Serbian president Slobodan Milošević of betrayal. Due to their resistance to complying with the plan, the State Security Directorate stopped its support for SNO.

== Trial ==
Due to their involvement in the Lovas killings, six members of the paramilitary unit were indicted for war crimes in 2008 by the Serbian Public Prosecutor's Office for War Crimes. In 2012, they were found guilty of war crimes, and with eight others, they were sentenced to a total of 128 years in prison. JNA officers that participated in the Lovas killings were not prosecuted. The Appellate Court, however, annulled the verdict in 2014, and the case was sent to retrial. In 2018, the trial began again, and it concluded in June 2019, when the Public Prosecutor's Office found eight men guilty of war crimes. The Humanitarian Law Center criticised the second trial for not including JNA officers. The Appellate Court cut the sentences of six men and acquitted two in 2021.

== Sources ==
- "Ukupno 47 godina zatvora za ratni zločin u Lovasu" [A Total of 47 Years of Imprisonment for the War Crime in Lovas]. Al Jazeera Balkans (in Serbian). 20 June 2019.
- "Trial Into Lovas Massacre Under Way". B92. 17 April 2008.
- Balkan Battlegrounds: A Military History of the Yugoslav Conflict (1st ed.). Central Intelligence Agency. 2002. ISBN 978-0-16-066472-4.
- "Apelacioni sud preinačio presudu u slučaju Lovas: Dvojica optuženih oslobođena, ostalima ublažene kazne" [The Court of Appeal Changed the Verdict in the Lovas Case: Two Defendants Were Acquitted, the Others Received Reduced Sentences]. Insajder (in Serbian). 19 January 2021.
- "Memorijal 12 redarstvenika, 2008" [12 Constables Memorial, 2008] (in Croatian). Ministry of the Interior (Croatia). 2008. Archived from the original on 25 September 2013.
- "Obilježena 22. obljetnica okupacije Lovasa" [22nd Anniversary of Lovas Occupation Marked]. Večernji list (in Croatian). 10 October 2013.
- Armatta, Judith (2010). Twilight of Impunity: The War Crimes Trial of Slobodan Milosevic. Duke University Press. ISBN 978-0-8223-4746-0.
- Cencich, John R. (2013). The Devil's Garden: A War Crimes Investigator's Story. Potomac Books. ISBN 978-1-61234-172-9.
- Mann, Michael (2005). The Dark Side of Democracy: Explaining Ethnic Cleansing. Cambridge University Press. ISBN 978-0-521-53854-1.
- Martinović, Iva; Teodorović, Miloš (11 April 2010). "Paravojne formacije - Dušan silni, Beli orlovi, Srpski sokolovi" [Paramilitary formations - Dušan the Mighty, White Eagles, Serbian Falcons]. Radio Free Europe (in Serbian).
- O'Shea, Brendan (2012). Perception and Reality in the Modern Yugoslav Conflict: Myth, Falsehood and Deceit 1991–1995. Routledge. ISBN 978-0-415-65024-3.
- Rebac, Iva (8 October 2020). "Ušli smo u podrum, župnik je ležao na leđima, mrtav, a na prsima mu prostrijelna rana" [We entered the basement, the pastor was lying on his back, dead, with a gunshot wound on his chest]. 24sata (in Croatian).
- Ristić, Marija (25 October 2012). "Serbian Justice Dismays Lovas Atrocity Survivors". Balkan Insight.
- Rudić, Filip (28 January 2019). "Serbia Prosecution Demands 59 Years' Jail for Lovas Massacre". Balkan Insight.
- Rupić, Marko, ed. (2007). Republika Hrvatska i Domovinski rat 1990. – 1995. – Dokumenti, Knjiga 1 [The Republic of Croatia and the Croatian War of Independence 1990–1995 – Documents, Volume 1]. Hrvatski memorijalno-dokumentacijski centar Domovinskog rata. ISBN 978-953-7439-03-3.
- Silber, Laura; Little, Allan (1996). The Death of Yugoslavia. Penguin Books. ISBN 978-0-14-026168-4.
- Šimičević, Hrvoje (17 April 2008). "Optuženi priznao masakr u Lovasu, ali tvrdi da nije sudjelova o" [Defendant Admits Lovas Massacre, Claims He Played no Part in it]. Nacional (in Croatian).
- Stojanović, Marija (4 June 2019). "Serbian Fighters Proclaim Innocence as Lovas Trial Concludes". Balkan Insight.
- Stojanović, Milica (20 January 2021). "Serbian Court Cuts Sentences for Wartime Killings of Croats". Balkan Insight.
- Sučić, Stjepan (June 2011). "Značaj obrane Vukovara u stvaranju hrvatske države" [Significance of Vukovar Defence in Creation of the Croatian State]. National Security and the Future (in Croatian). 12 (3). St. George Association: 11–69. ISSN 1332-4454.
- Thomas, Robert (1998). Serbia Under Milošević: Politics in the 1990s (1st ed.). London: C. Hurst & Co. ISBN 978-1-85065-367-7.
- Thomas, Nigel; Mikulan, Krunislav (2006). The Yugoslav Wars (1): Slovenia & Croatia 1991–95. Osprey Publishing. ISBN 978-1-84176-963-9.
- Trbovich, Ana S. (2008). A Legal Geography of Yugoslavia's Disintegration. Oxford University Press. ISBN 978-0-19-533343-5.
