= Belgrade Sports Gymnasium =

Coordinates: 44.8213°N 20.4702°E

- Спортска гимназија Београд; Sportska gimnazija Beograd
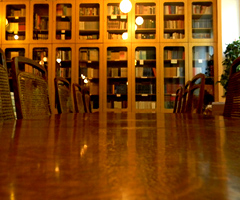
- The school library pictured in 2011
- Herceg Stjepan Street 7 Belgrade; Serbia

Information
- Type: Public
- Established: 27 September 1937; 88 years ago
- Language: Serbian
- Campus: Urban
- Website: www.sportskagimnazija.edu.rs

Belgrade Sports Gymnasium (Serbian: Спортска гимназија Београд, romanized: Sportska gimnazija Beograd) is a gymnasium (Central European type of grammar school) in Belgrade, Serbia.

It was founded as the Eleventh Belgrade Gymnasium (Serbian: Једанаеста београдска гимназија, romanized: Jedanaesta beogradska gimnazija) in 1937. It was renamed and began operating as the Sports Gymnasium in September 2002 with classes taking place in two buildings – in the building of the former Eleventh Belgrade Gymnasium and in the building at 2a Petra Čajkovskog Street. Since 2017, the school has been located in a building at Ulica Herceg Stjepana 7, on the site of the former Stari Grad elementary school.

== History ==
The eleventh high school was founded on 27 September 1937 by decree of the then Ministry of Education, under the name Seventh Male Real Gymnasium. The first school year 1937/38. the gymnasium was mixed. Although it was male by name, women's departments were organized. In terms of the number of students, the Seventh Boys' Gymnasium was the most numerous in Belgrade. It had 32 classes, 16 male and 16 female, with a total of 1511 students. The first director of the high school was Miraš Kljaović, a professor, and 55 professors and teachers and 7 associates worked at the school. School 1938/39. in 2006, the sixth female high school was formed from the female classes, which was located in the pavilions near Autokomanda, near the current stadium. Since then, the seventh male real gymnasium became purely male and continued as such until 1953. During the occupation, the gymnasium was located in two places. The upper grades (from fifth to eighth) were in the building of the pre-war Fourth Male Real Gymnasium, on the corner of Tiršova Street and Vojvoda Mirko, and the lower grades were in Jove Ilića Street in the building of the then "Bora Stanković" elementary school.

In 1948, the gymnasium was moved to a new building at 71 Grčića Milenko Street (where it is still located). It was then named "Ruđer Bošković" in the 1960/61 school year. The Eleventh Belgrade High School received a large number of students and professors from the then Fifteenth High School due to the abolition of that school. Then the problem of lack of space arose, which was getting bigger every year because every school year the number of students whose interests were directed towards acquiring high school knowledge as a basis for further education increased. That problem was solved by using the "Sumadija" facility. The Eleventh Belgrade Gymnasium only got adequate and comprehensive space when it moved to the "Stevan Sinđelić" elementary school, after this school moved to a new building.

During its 60 years of operation, the high school was organized in the period from 1980 to 1990, due to the reform of the school system at that time, as a school for the education of production occupations, which had to establish a stronger connection between educational institutions and the country's economy. This concept of the school was quickly rejected. By returning to the old school system, the Eleventh Belgrade High School maintained its basic commitment: educating students according to a program that ensures continued education at a higher level and eligibility for admission to all faculties in the country. Teaching is organized on the basis of unique plans and programs for gymnasiums through the fields of: natural-mathematical and social-linguistic.

== Notable alumni ==
- Dragoslav Bokan
- Dragoljub "Mićko" Ljubičić
- Milo Lompar
- Dragomir Mihajlović
- Marijana Mićić
- Milan Mladenović
- Milenko Savović
- Ljubodrag "Duci" Simonović
- Aleksandra Melnichenko
