= Serbian Renewal Movement =

Political party in Serbia

Serbian Renewal Movement Српски покрет обнове
- Abbreviation: SPO
- Leader: Aleksandar Cvetković
- Founders: Vuk Drašković; Vojislav Šešelj
- Founded: 14 March 1990; 36 years ago
- Split from: Serbian National Renewal
- Headquarters: Knez Mihailova Street 48, Belgrade
- Paramilitary wing: Serbian Guard (1991–92)
- Ideology: Liberalism; Economic liberalism; Monarchism
- Political position: Centre-right
- Parliamentary group: Aleksandar Vučić – Serbia Must Not Stop
- Colours: Red; Blue; White
- Anthem: "Himna Srpskog pokreta obnove" ("Anthem of the Serbian Renewal Movement")
- National Assembly: 0 / 250
- Assembly of Vojvodina: 1 / 120
- City Assembly of Belgrade: 1 / 110

Website
- spo.rs

The Serbian Renewal Movement (Serbian: Српски покрет обнове, romanised: Srpski pokret obnove, abbr. SPO) is a liberal and monarchist political party in Serbia. It was founded in 1990 by writer Vuk Drašković, who served as the party's president until 2024. Aleksandar Cvetković is the incumbent leader.

== History ==
=== Formation ===
Drašković was a writer for most of his life and he particularly became known in the 1980s due to his nationalist-themed books. He formed the Saint Sava Association in 1989 with Mirko Jović, Vojislav Šešelj, and Veljko Guberina, which sought to promote nationalism in Vojvodina. This association became a political party named Serbian National Renewal (SNO) in January 1990. Jović became the president of SNO and Drašković served along with Žarko Gavrilović as one of the vice-presidents of the party.

As the chief ideologist of SNO, Drašković drafted its plan on expanding Serbia's borders which were based on historical and ethnic borders of the Serbs. Alongside this, SNO also advocated for the restoration of the monarchy and de-Titoisation. A schism inside SNO occurred in March 1990. Jović began attacking Drašković due to his past membership in the League of Communists of Yugoslavia, while Drašković criticised Jović due to his pro-Slobodan Milošević views. Drašković created a faction inside SNO that with Šešelj, who at the time led the Serbian Freedom Movement, merged to form the Serbian Renewal Movement (SPO) on 14 March 1990. Drašković was chosen as the party's president.

At the time of the formation of SPO, Yugoslavia was still a one-party state. However, after a July 1990 referendum, Serbia adopted a multi-party system and SPO became a registered political party. According to political scientist Vukašin Pavlović, SPO implemented elements of a political movement, rather than a political party, after its formation.

=== 1990–1994 ===
Former logo

Drašković and Šešelj were unable to cooperate together and in May 1990 Šešelj left SPO due to a dispute over whether to protest Siniša Kovačević's play titled Saint Sava. Šešelj went on to form the Serbian Chetnik Movement, whose registration was rejected, and then the Serbian Radical Party (SRS). After the July 1990 referendum, first multi-party elections in Serbia were called to be held in December 1990. SPO believed that the referendum should have occurred once the multi-party elections ended and the National Assembly of Serbia was constituted. Despite this, SPO decided to take part in the elections; Drašković was SPO's presidential candidate.

During the 1990 election campaign, SPO organised protests in opposition to the policies of Radio Television of Serbia (RTS) and protests due to alleged electoral manipulation. Together with another opposition party, the Democratic Party (DS), SPO threatened to boycott the election due to the election conditions. SPO sought to start its actions in towns and villages of the Šumadija region; Drašković called Valjevo his "political capital". SPO did also campaign briefly in Kosovo, but was met with opposition from Milošević supporters. Additionally, Drašković used nationalist rhetoric in his speeches, earning the nickname "King of the Streets" due to his fiery oratory skills. Their campaign ended when a SPO activist was murdered by a Socialist Party of Serbia (SPS) member. Drašković won 16 per cent of the popular vote and was eventually defeated by Milošević in the first round of the election in a landslide. SPO only won 19 seats in the National Assembly, due to Serbia's new first-past-the-post electoral system, which favoured Milošević's SPS, the then-ruling and largest party of Serbia. Another factor that contributed to SPO's failure at gathering more votes was that SPS also used nationalist rhetoric. Drašković portrayed the election as a contest "between Bolshevism and democracy, the past and the future". Although a second round of the presidential elections did not occur, opposition parties did briefly gather around the United Opposition of Serbia coalition, signing a declaration in which they declared that citizens should vote for the opposition candidate in the second round, regardless of their party affiliation.

SPO was disappointed with government's domination in the media and together with DS, it announced a protest for 9 March 1991. Despite the government banning the gathering, demonstrators gathered in Belgrade; they were attacked by the police. Drašković was eventually arrested and Studio B and B92 radio stations were closed down. The protests increased in size and Milošević was met with pressure; Drašković was released, Studio B and B92 were allowed to broadcast again, and the RTS director was sacked. Author Robert Thomas said that Drašković came under criticism from certain opposition politicians due to not taking the advantage of the protests after his release. After the protests, SPO went to form the shortly-lived United Serbian Democratic Opposition with the Serbian Liberal Party and New Democracy–Movement for Serbia that existed up till late summer of 1991.

The Democratic Movement of Serbia was formed in May 1992 as a political alliance made up primarily of SPO, New Democracy (ND), Democratic Party of Serbia (DSS). The political alliance however broke, and was dissolved in 1993.

=== 1995–1997 ===
The SPO was part of the "Together" (Zajedno) coalition in the 1996 parliamentary election which received 23.8% of the popular vote, losing to the Socialist Party of Serbia (SPS). In 1997, Drašković ran twice for president but finished third in both elections. Its party won the third largest number of seats in that year's Serbian parliamentary elections. A dissident group inside the party abandoned the SPO and formed New Serbia (NS) in 1997.

=== 1998–2001 ===
In early 1999, the SPO joined the Slobodan Milošević-led government, and Drašković became a Yugoslav Deputy Prime Minister. The SPO had a place in Serbia's Rambouillet Agreement delegation and held posts such as the Yugoslav Information Ministry to show a more pro-Western face to the world in the run-up to NATO's bombing campaign in 1999 against the country. In the midst of the war, Drašković and the SPO pulled out of the government, calling on Milošević to surrender to NATO.

The SPO participated in an attempt to overthrow Milošević in 1999, which faltered after Drašković broke off his alliance with opposition leader Zoran Đinđić. This caused the anti-Milošević elements to suggest that he was working for Milošević.

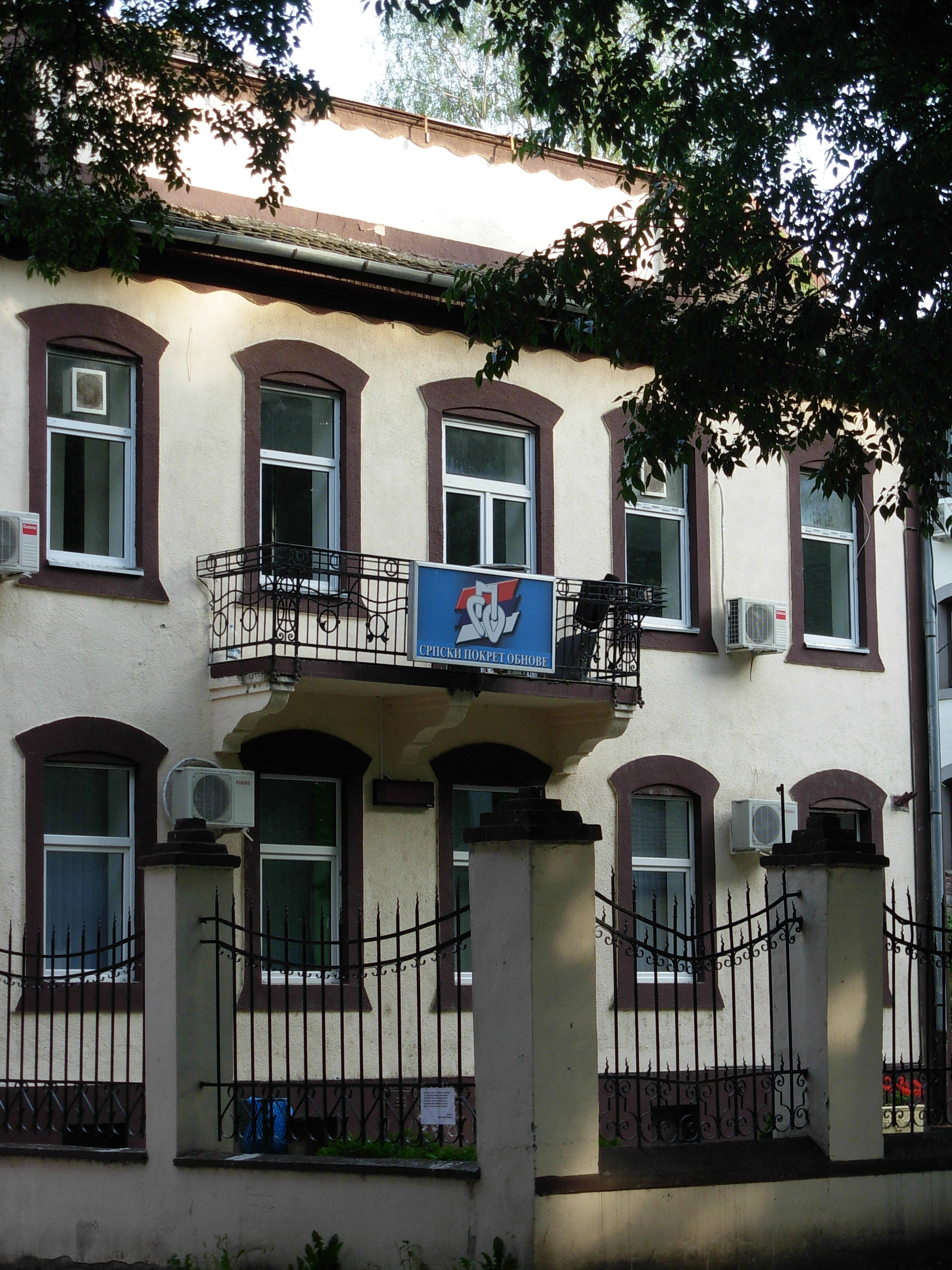
Party offices in Novi Sad

In 2000 presidential and parliamentary elections in the Federal Republic of Yugoslavia in which Milošević lost, the Serbian Renewal Movement overestimated its strength and ran independently, outside of the vast Democratic Opposition of Serbia coalition. Vojislav Mihajlović, grandson of Chetnik commander Draža Mihajlović, was its presidential candidate. He was opposed by Vojislav Koštunica of DOS, Slobodan Milošević of the ruling SPS and Tomislav Nikolić of the Serbian Radical Party. The SPO's vote collapsed, with its traditional voters drawn by Kostunica's conservatism and by the fact that he was their best hope to remove Milošević from power.

There was talk before the 5 October changes of dissolving the Mirko Marjanović government in Serbia and setting up a government with the Serbian Radical Party. Following the 5 October changes the SPO participated in a so-called national unity government that served effectively under DOS "coordinator" Zoran Đinđić. In December 2000, after two months of DOS rule, Serbian parliamentary elections were held. The SPO, once the strongest opposition, failed to enter the parliament.

=== 2002–2007 ===
In 2003, Drašković called for the re-establishment of a parliamentary monarchy in Serbia as the best means for its European integration.

The party fought the December 2003 legislative elections in a coalition with New Serbia. The coalition received 7.7% of the popular vote and 22 seats in parliament. 13 of these were allocated to the SPO. In turn, the coalition had dispatched 8 deputies into the federal Assembly of Serbia and Montenegro.

SPO-NS became part of Vojislav Koštunica's first elected cabinet. Vuk Drašković was selected for Minister of Foreign Affairs.

In 2004, nine members of the National Assembly left SPO, citing their disapproval with the party's leadership. Together with seven members of SPO's main board and two vice-presidents of SPO, they formalised the Serbian Democratic Renewal Movement (SDPO).

One of the 4 was then bought off by the political tycoon Bogoljub Karić to form his party's list.

The SPO participated in the 2007 election independently and received 3.33% of the vote, winning no seats.

=== 2008–2024 ===
In the 2008 elections the SPO took part in the For a European Serbia coalition under President Boris Tadić, receiving 38.42% of the vote and 102 seats in parliament. Four seats were given to the SPO along with the Ministry of Diaspora portfolio.

Drašković resigned as party leader on 12 July 2024 and was succeeded by Aleksandar Cvetković.

== Ideology ==
During the 1990s, the Serbian Renewal Movement was orientated towards ultranationalism and irredentism, and it supported revisionism and anti-communism. During that period, it was positioned on the right-wing on the political spectrum. It was also characterised as a right-wing populist party, and it was backed by the Serbian Orthodox Church. It also held conservative views.

Although after the 2000s, the party rejected its radical nationalist past and statism, and embraced liberal-democratic elements. It also shifted to liberalism, and economic liberalism, and it adopted a more moderate right, and centre-right position. It was also described as moderate nationalist during that period.

Since its inception, it has been described as monarchist, and it advocates for the restoration of parliamentary monarchy. Since the late 2000s, it has been supportive of accession of Serbia to the European Union and NATO, and in the early 2010s, it shifted its support towards the recognition of Kosovo.

== Organisation ==
=== International cooperation ===
During the party's early history, when SPO still favoured a Greater Serbian policy, Drašković intended SPO to also have branches in Yugoslavia's constituent republics where Serbs were a large minority, such as in Croatia and Bosnia and Herzegovina. There was a proposal to form SPO branches in Bosnia and Herzegovina at the congress in October 1990, however, Drašković rejected it, stating that "such a move would only serve to divide the Serbian voters"; he described Radovan Karadžić's Serb Democratic Party as a "sister-party to our movement". SPO did eventually nominate candidates for the 1990 Bosnian municipal elections and only one SPO candidate was elected in the Assembly of Nevesinje.

=== List of presidents ===
#	President	Birth–Death	Term start	Term end
1	Vuk Drašković	1946–	14 March 1990	12 July 2024
2	Aleksandar Cvetković	1977–	12 July 2024	Incumbent

== Electoral performance ==
=== Serbia ===
==== Parliamentary elections ====
National Assembly of Serbia
Year	Leader	Popular vote	% of popular vote	#	# of seats	Seat change	Coalition	Status	Ref.
1990	Vuk Drašković	794,786	16.49%	▲2nd	19 / 250	▲19	–	Opposition	
1992	Vuk Drašković	797,831	17.98%	▼3rd	30 / 250	▲11	DEPOS	Opposition	
1993	Vuk Drašković	715,564	17.34%	▲2nd	37 / 250	▲7	DEPOS	Opposition	
1997	Vuk Drašković	793,988	19.99%	▼3rd	45 / 250	▲8	–	Opposition	
2000	Vuk Drašković	141,401	3.86%	▼5th	0 / 250	▼45	–	Extra-parliamentary	
2003	Vuk Drašković	293,082	7.76%	5th	13 / 250	▲13	SPO–NS	Government	
2007	Vuk Drašković	134,147	3.38%	▼6th	0 / 250	▼13	SPO–LS–NS–ŽZK	Extra-parliamentary	
2008	Vuk Drašković	1,590,200	39.25%	▲1st	4 / 250	▲4	ZES	Government	
2012	Vuk Drašković	255,546	6.83%	▼5th	4 / 250	0	U-Turn	Opposition	
2014	Vuk Drašković	1,736,920	49.96%	▲1st	5 / 250	▲1	BKV	Support	
2016	Vuk Drašković	1,823,147	49.71%	1st	3 / 250	▼2	SP	Support	
2020	Vuk Drašković	1,953,998	63.02%	1st	3 / 250	0	ZND	Support	
2022	Vuk Drašković	1,635,101	44.27%	1st	2 / 250	▼1	ZMS	Support	
2023	Vuk Drašković	1,783,701	48.07%	1st	2 / 250	0	SNSDS	Support 2023–24	
2023	Vuk Drašković	1,783,701	48.07%	1st	2 / 250	0	–	Opposition 2024–26	
2026	Aleksandar Cvetković	Did not participate			0 / 250	▼2	Supported SL	Extra-parliamentary	

==== Presidential elections ====
President of Serbia
Year	Candidate	1st round popular vote		% of popular vote	2nd round popular vote		% of popular vote	Notes
1990	Vuk Drašković	2nd	824,674	16.95%	—N/a	—	—	
1992	Milan Panić	2nd	1,516,693	34.65%	—N/a	—	—	Supported Panić
Sep 1997	Vuk Drašković	3rd	852,808	21.46%	—N/a	—	—	Election annulled due to low turnout
Dec 1997	Vuk Drašković	3rd	587,776	15.74%	—N/a	—	—	
Sep–Oct 2002	Vuk Drašković	4th	159,959	4.49%	—N/a	—	—	Election annulled due to low turnout
Dec 2002	Election boycott							Election annulled due to low turnout
2003	Election boycott							Election annulled due to low turnout
2004	Dragan Maršićanin	4th	414,971	13.47%	—N/a	—	—	Supported Maršićanin
2008	Velimir Ilić	3rd	305,828	7.57%	—N/a	—	—	Supported Ilić
2012	Čedomir Jovanović	6th	196,668	5.27%	—N/a	—	—	Supported Jovanović
2017	Aleksandar Vučić	1st	2,012,788	56.01%	—N/a	—	—	Supported Vučić
2022	Aleksandar Vučić	1st	2,224,914	60.01%	—N/a	—	—	Supported Vučić

=== Bosnia and Herzegovina ===
Chamber of Municipalities
Year	no.	Popular vote	% of popular vote	Overall seats won	Government
1990	#6	4,217	0.2%	1 / 110	opposition
