= Serbian National Renewal =

Serbian National Renewal Српска народна обнова Srpska narodna obnova
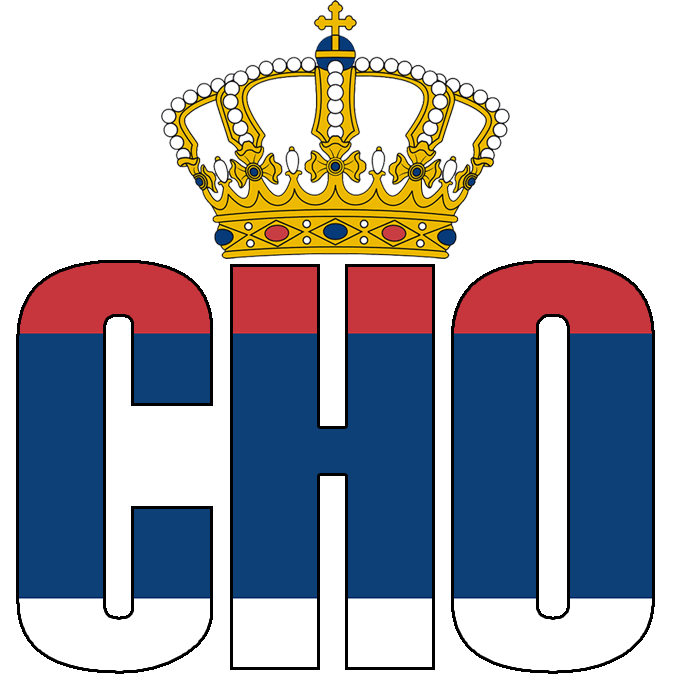
- Abbreviation: SNO
- Leader: Mirko Jović
- General Secretary: Aleksandar Spasić (1990); Dragoslav Bokan (1990–1992)
- Vice Presidents: Vuk Drašković; Ilija Gligorijević; Žarko Gavrilović; Milimir Đuričić
- Founders: Mirko Jović; Vuk Drašković
- Founded: 6 January 1990
- Dissolved: 1996
- Succeeded by: Serbian Renewal Movement (in March 1990); Serb Democratic Party
- Headquarters: Nova Pazova
- Newspaper: Nove ideje (New Ideas)
- Youth wing: White Eagles
- Military wing: Dušan the Mighty
- Ideology: Serbian nationalism National conservatism Serbian irredentism Monarchism
- Political position: Right-wing
- Slogan: "Svesno u desno" ("Consciously to the right")

The Serbian National Renewal (Serbian: Српска народна обнова, romanized: Srpska narodna obnova; abbr. SNO) was a nationalist political party in Serbia that existed in the first half of the 1990s.

== History ==
The Serbian National Renewal was formed around the Saint Sava Society started by Mirko Jović in August 1988. It was established as a political party on 6 January 1990 in Nova Pazova with Jović becoming party president, and the novelist Vuk Drašković and Orthodox priest and theologian Žarko Gavrilović becoming its vice presidents.

Soon after, a split emerged between Drašković and Jović, and Drašković left the party on 10 March 1990. His faction would unite with the Serbian Freedom Movement led by Vojislav Šešelj to form the Serbian Renewal Movement on 14 March.

Žarko Gavrilović left the SNO soon after Drašković, and went on to form the clerical Serbian Saint Sava Party on 15 April 1990. In October, Mihajlo Mladenović and general secretary Aleksandar Spasić left the SNO to form the Serbian Royalist Bloc. Due to these splits, by the time of the December 1990 elections, the first multi-party elections in Serbia, the SNO was already a spent force and managed to secure 0.8% of the vote and no seats in parliament.

In late 1990, Dragoslav Bokan joined the Serbian National Renewal and became the party's general secretary. He became the commander of the party's youth wing, the White Eagles, which took its name from the youth wing of the fascist Zbor movement from interwar Yugoslavia. During the Croatian War of Independence, the party deployed a volunteer unit under the name "Dušan Silni" (Dušan the Mighty) which took an active role in Slavonia during 1991, and participated in the Battle of Borovo Selo in May 1991. On 13 December 1991, the SNO volunteers participated in the Voćin massacre, targeting Croatian civilians during their retreat from the village of Voćin. During this time, the volunteers were supplied and controlled by the Yugoslav State Security Service.

The SNO lost its patronage from the State Security after their decision to support Croatian Serb leader Milan Babić in his resistance to the Vance plan signed by Serbian president Slobodan Milošević in November 1991. This would relegate the party and its president Jović to the margins of Serbian politics. In 1996, the Serbian National Renewal was merged into Radovan Karadžić's Serb Democratic Party (SDS).

In January 2021, members of the Dušan Silni volunteer unit Saša Stojanović, Jovan Dimitrijević and Zoran Kosijer were found guilty of war crimes related to the Lovas killings in October 1991 by the Appeals Court in Belgrade.

In October 2024, Jović announced that SNO would be reconstituted and that the party would be ideologically conservative and centre-right.

== Ideology ==
The Serbian National Renewal advocated for the decommunization of Serbia, the rehabilitation of the Chetnik movement, the return of the Karađorđević dynasty and Serbian irredentism. The party program, written by Vuk Drašković, envisioned Serbia as the "Piedmont" of Serbian unification and the new Serbian state as a multi-party democracy.

== Electoral performance ==
=== Parliamentary elections ===
National Assembly of Serbia
Year	Leader	Popular vote	% of popular vote	# of seats	Seat change	Status
1990	Mirko Jović	40,359	0.84%	0 / 250	Steady	non-parliamentary
1992	Mirko Jović	84,568	1.91%	0 / 250	Steady	non-parliamentary
1993	Mirko Jović	15,187	0.37%	0 / 250	Steady	non-parliamentary
