= Battle of Borovo Selo =

1991 Croatian War of Independence battle

Coordinates: 45°22′51.60″N 18°57′27.00″E

- Part of the Croatian War of Independence and the Yugoslav Wars
Date	2 May 1991
Location	Borovo Selo, Croatia
Result	Serbian Krajina victory

Belligerents
SAO Krajina	Croatia

Commanders and leaders
Vukašin Šoškoćanin; Vojislav Šešelj	Josip Džaja; Josip Reihl-Kir

Units involved
Krajina Territorial Defense; Borovo Selo Territorial Defense; Krajina Militia; Dušan the Mighty; White Eagles	Croatian Police

Strength
Unknown	180 policemen

Casualties and losses
1 killed 4 wounded	12 killed 22 wounded 2 captured

The Battle of Borovo Selo of 2 May 1991, known in Croatia as the Borovo Selo massacre (Croatian: Pokolj u Borovom Selu) and in Serbia as the Borovo Selo incident (Serbian: Инцидент у Боровом Селу), was one of the first armed clashes in the conflict which became known as the Croatian War of Independence. The clash was precipitated by months of rising ethnic tensions, violence, and armed combat in Pakrac and at the Plitvice Lakes in March. The immediate cause for the confrontation in the heavily ethnic Serb village of Borovo Selo, just north of Vukovar, was a failed attempt to replace the Yugoslav flag in the village with the flag of Croatia. The unauthorised effort by four Croatian policemen resulted in the capture of two by a Croatian Serb militia. To rescue the captives, the Croatian authorities deployed additional police, who drove into an ambush. Twelve Croatian policemen and one Serb paramilitary were killed before the Yugoslav People's Army (JNA) intervened and put an end to the clashes.

The confrontation resulted in a further deterioration of the overall situation in Croatia, leading Croats and Serbs to accuse each other of overt aggression and of being enemies of their nation. For Croatia, the event was provocative because the bodies of some of the dead Croat policemen were reportedly mutilated. The clash eliminated any hopes that the escalating conflict could be defused politically and made the war almost inevitable. The Presidency of Yugoslavia convened several days after the battle and authorised the JNA to deploy to the area to prevent further conflict. Despite this, skirmishes persisted in the region. After the war, a former paramilitary was convicted of war crimes for his role in abusing the two captured policemen, and ultimately sentenced to three years in prison. Four others were indicted, but remain at large outside Croatia.

== Background ==
In 1990, following the electoral defeat of the government of the Socialist Republic of Croatia by the right-wing Croatian Democratic Union (Hrvatska demokratska zajednica – HDZ), ethnic tensions between Serbs and Croats worsened. The Yugoslav People's Army (Jugoslovenska Narodna Armija – JNA) confiscated the weapons of Croatia's Territorial Defence (Teritorijalna obrana – TO) in order to minimise the possibility of violence following the elections. On 17 August, inter-ethnic tensions escalated into an open revolt of the Croatian Serbs, centred on the predominantly Serb-populated areas of the Dalmatian hinterland around Knin, and parts of Lika, Kordun, Banovina and eastern Croatia.

In July 1990, local Serbs established a Serbian National Council to coordinate opposition to Croatian President Franjo Tuđman's policy of pursuing Croatian independence from Yugoslavia. Milan Babić, a dentist from Knin, was elected president of the council, while Knin's police chief, Milan Martić, established a number of paramilitary militias. The two men eventually became the political and military leaders of the Serb Autonomous Oblast of Krajina (SAO Krajina), a self-declared state incorporating the Serb-inhabited areas of Croatia. In March 1991, SAO Krajina authorities, backed by the government of Serbia, began consolidating control over the Serb-populated areas of Croatia, resulting in a bloodless skirmish in Pakrac and the first fatalities in the Plitvice Lakes incident.

At the beginning of 1991, Croatia had no regular army. In an effort to bolster its defence, it doubled the number of police personnel to about 20,000. The most effective part of the police force was the 3,000-strong special police, which was deployed in twelve military-style battalions. In addition, Croatia had 9,000–10,000 regionally organised reserve police officers organised in 16 battalions and 10 companies, but they lacked weapons.

== Prelude ==
Map of the eastern Slavonia area between Osijek and Vukovar (modern county lines provided for reference)

In 1991, the village of Borovo Selo, situated on the right bank of the Danube opposite Serbia, was a part of the Vukovar municipality. While the city of Vukovar itself had an ethnically mixed population of 47.2 per cent Croats and 32.2 per cent Serbs, smaller settlements in the area were more homogeneous. Fourteen were predominantly populated by Croats, ten (including Borovo Selo) by Serbs, two by Ruthenians and the remaining two were ethnically mixed.

Amid the worsening ethnic tensions, Borovo Selo was barricaded on 1 April, one day after the Plitvice Lakes clash. Two days later, the JNA garrison in Vukovar increased its combat readiness to the maximum level. In early spring, the Croats and Serbs reached an agreement whereby Croatian police would not enter Borovo Selo without explicit consent from local Serb authorities. A political rally was held in Borovo Selo on 14 April, and by the end of the month the situation had become more volatile. Speakers at the rally—Serbian Radical Party (Srpska radikalna stranka – SRS) leader Vojislav Šešelj, Serbian National Assembly member Milan Paroški and Serbian Minister of Diaspora Stanko Cvijan—promoted the creation of Greater Serbia, a state which would unite all Serbs within a single country. They all repeated their speeches, together with an open call for dissenting Croats to be killed, a week later in Jagodnjak, north of Osijek.

In addition, White Eagles paramilitaries arrived in Borovo Selo in mid-April at the request of local militia commander Vukašin Šoškoćanin. The paramilitaries were either armed directly by Serbia's Ministry of the Interior or by a militia linked to the SAO Krajina, with the approval of the Serbian authorities. By the end of April 1991, the White Eagles in Borovo Selo were joined by fighters from the Dušan the Mighty paramilitary unit, which was linked to the Serbian National Renewal party.

In mid-April, Armbrust rockets were fired from Croatian positions outside Borovo Selo into the village. According to one version of the event, several rounds were fired at agricultural machinery that served as barricades in the outskirts of Borovo Selo. According to a second version, three rockets were fired at the village with the specific aim of inflaming ethnic tensions. One of the rockets struck a house and another landed in a field without detonating. There were no casualties. Radio-Television Belgrade subsequently broadcast images of the rockets and presented them as evidence of Croatian aggression, further exacerbating inter-ethnic tensions. The rockets were fired by a group of men who were led to the site by Osijek police chief Josip Reihl-Kir, who was later killed by Croatian irregulars. Croatia's Interior Minister Josip Boljkovac later indicated that the group included Deputy Defence Minister Gojko Šušak, Branimir Glavaš and Vice Vukojević. Šušak claimed that he had nothing to do with the incident, but admitted to having been in the area at the time. Nikola Jaman, then a reserve unit commander in the Ministry of the Interior, later stated that he had led the action, and denied that Šušak, Glavaš and Vukojević had been involved. He claimed that the action was planned together with Reihl-Kir.

== Timeline ==
Croatian police in Borovo Selo, 2 May 1991.

During the evening of 1 May 1991, four Croatian policemen entered Borovo Selo in an unauthorised attempt to replace a flag of Yugoslavia in the village with a flag of Croatia. The attempt resulted in an armed clash. Two of the policemen were wounded and taken prisoner. The other two fled after sustaining minor injuries, one a wounded foot and the other a grazed head. According to Croatia's Ministry of the Interior, the police had been patrolling the Dalj–Borovo Selo road at the time of the incident. Even though the officers were assigned to the Osijek police administration, the Vinkovci police administration—which was assigned authority over the Vukovar municipality—asked the Vukovar police station to contact Šoškoćanin about the incident. Vukovar police contacted him at 4:30 a.m., but Šoškoćanin reportedly said he knew nothing. At 9:00 a.m., Vinkovci police chief Josip Drozdek telephoned Šoškoćanin and received the same answer. When Reihl-Kir contacted Šoškoćanin half an hour later, the latter confirmed the incident and said the police had shot at members of the local population, wounding one. Reihl-Kir failed to secure the release of the two captured officers.

Reihl-Kir and Džaja concluded that a party should be sent to Borovo Selo. Šoškoćanin agreed to grant the police safe passage under a white flag. A force of twenty to thirty policemen subsequently entered Borovo Selo. Although they bore a white flag, they were ambushed by paramilitaries and members of a local militia. Around 150 policemen arrived from Osijek and Vinkovci on buses and were deployed as reinforcements. The force dispatched from Vinkovci entered Borovo Selo and was ambushed, while the reinforcements sent from Osijek via Dalj were stopped at a roadblock north of Borovo Selo and failed to enter the village. A firefight ensued and lasted until 2:30 p.m., when seven JNA armoured personnel carriers (APCs) moved into the village from Dalj. Another convoy of APCs deployed by the JNA through Borovo Naselje, just south of Borovo Selo, was stopped by a crowd of Croat women who refused to let them through.

== Aftermath ==
=== Casualties ===
Twelve Croatian policemen were killed and 21 injured in the ambush. The two captured policemen were ferried across the Danube and transported to Novi Sad, but were released and returned to Osijek by the evening of 2 May. Vojislav Milić, a paramilitary from Valjevo, was the only fatality among the Serb militia. Four other paramilitaries were wounded. Some of the police killed at Borovo Selo were found to have been mutilated, their ears cut, their eyes gouged out and their throats slit. These acts were meant to inflame ethnic hatred.

=== Escalation to war ===
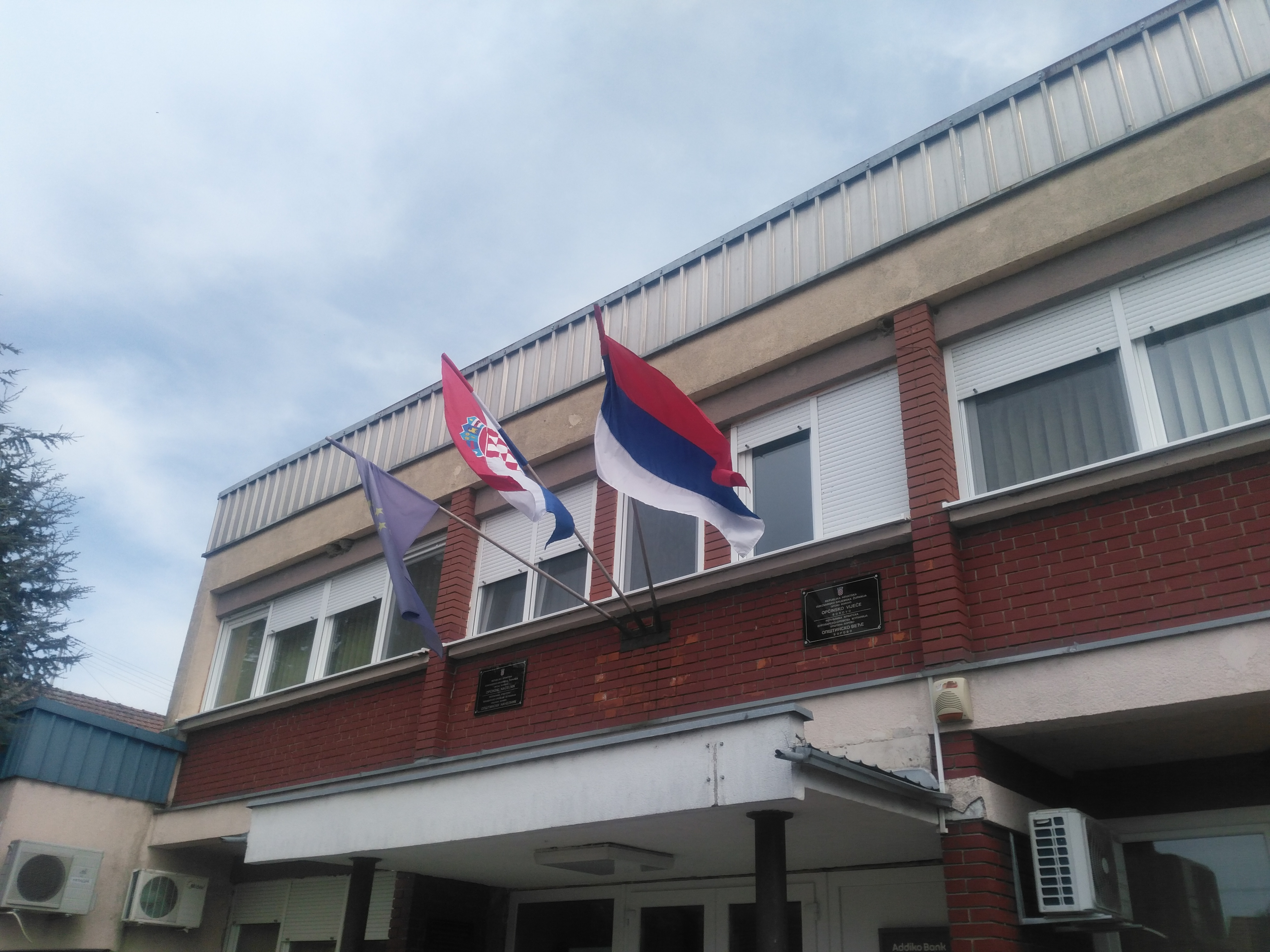
The municipal building at the center of the May 1991 incident, as seen in April 2021

The clash led Tuđman's advisers to advocate an immediate declaration of independence from Yugoslavia and retaliation against the JNA, which Croats viewed as being pro-Serb. On 3 May, Tuđman opined that Croatia and Serbia were virtually at war, but said he hoped the international community would stop the violence. According to the Croatian historian Davor Marijan, Tuđman's decision not to retaliate against the JNA was often interpreted at the time as cowardice bordering treason, leading to public criticism and the resignation of General Martin Špegelj from the post of defence minister. Nonetheless, the decision afforded Croatia much-needed time to prepare for war, as Yugoslav Navy Fleet Admiral Branko Mamula later acknowledged. The incident shocked the Croatian public, causing a massive shift in public opinion towards demonisation of Serbs, supported by the Croatian media. Serbs were collectively labelled "Chetniks", "terrorists" and "enemies of Croatia". Similarly, Serbs referred to Croats as "Ustaše" and "enemies of the Serb people". Thus, a political settlement to avoid all-out war became increasingly unlikely. After the clash, war appeared unavoidable.

On 8–9 May, the Presidency of Yugoslavia convened to discuss the events in Borovo Selo and deliberate over a JNA request for military intervention. The presidents of all of Yugoslavia's constituent republics were present at the meeting. The Croatian leadership permitted the JNA to be deployed to areas where inter-ethnic tensions were running high. On 9 May, representatives of the federal and Croatian governments visited Vukovar. Federal representatives visited Borovo Selo, unlike the Croatian government officials who stated they "refused to talk to terrorists". In response to the Borovo Selo clash, the JNA redeployed a part of the 12th Proletarian Mechanised Brigade from Osijek and the 1st Mechanised Battalion of the 453rd Mechanised Brigade based in Sremska Mitrovica to the Vukovar area. At the same time, the 2nd Mechanised Battalion of the 36th Mechanised Brigade was moved from Subotica to Vinkovci. Despite the deployment of the JNA in the area, ethnically motivated skirmishes persisted until the start of the Battle of Vukovar in late August.

=== Memorial controversy and prosecution ===
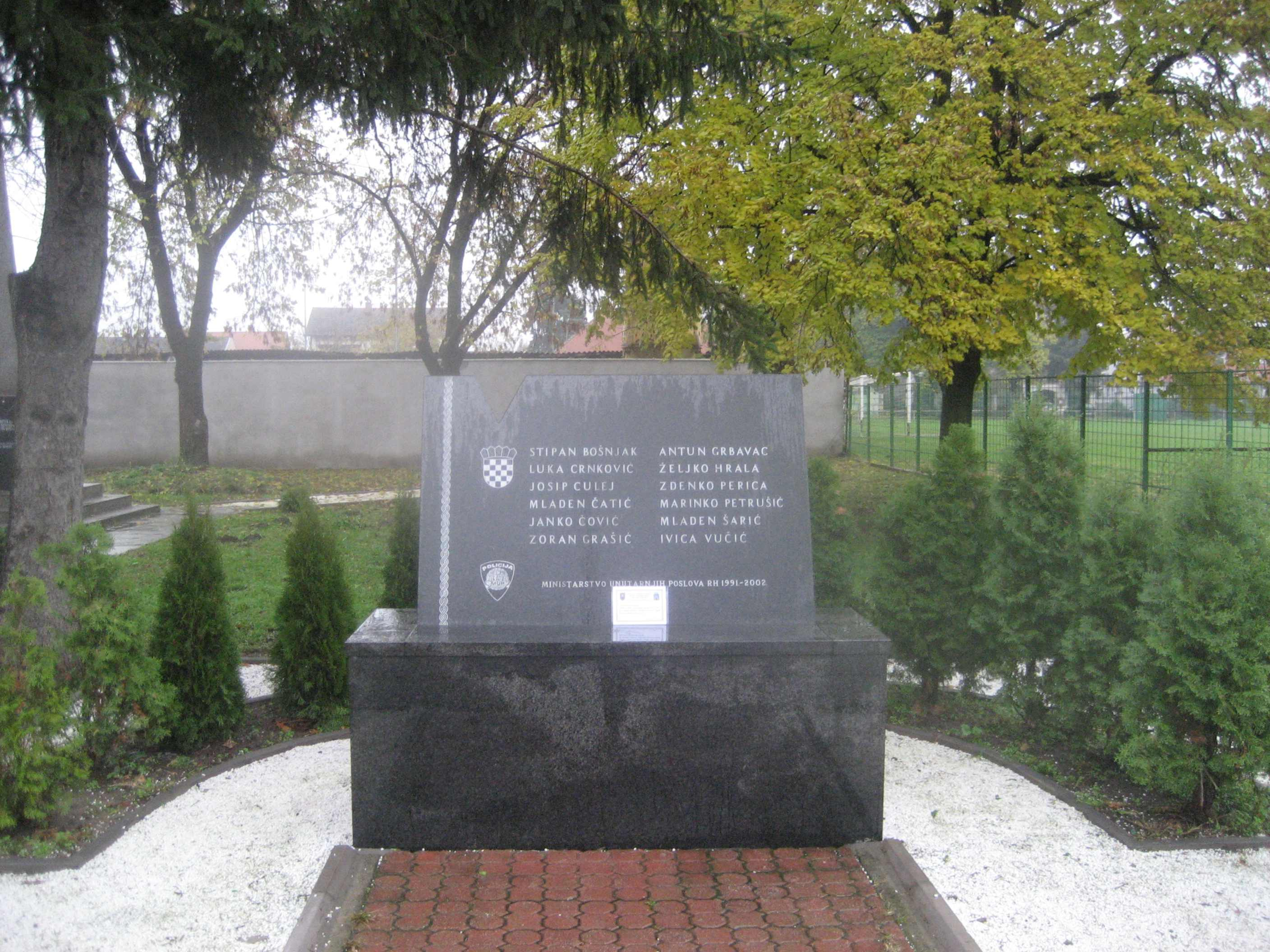
The Borovo Selo memorial as it appeared prior to 2012

During the 1996–98 United Nations administration established pursuant to the Erdut Agreement to restore the area to Croatian control, three Croatian non-governmental organisations erected a memorial on public property at the entrance to Borovo Selo, but the site was quickly vandalised. A new monument was erected in the centre of the village in 2002, but this was also vandalised soon after completion. A new plaque bearing the names of the 12 Croatian policemen killed in the incident was added to the monument in 2012, but was also subject to vandalism. Although the vandalism was condemned by local Serb politicians, they complained that the memorial was offensive to the Serb minority and imposed guilt on the entire community because it branded Serb forces at Borovo Selo in 1991 as "Serb terrorists".

In February 2012, an Osijek court convicted Milan Marinković of war crimes and sentenced him to three-and-a-half years in prison for mistreating two captured Croatian police officers. In 2014, Marinković's sentence was reduced to three years on appeal. Four other men were indicted in relation to the officers' mistreatment. Since they live outside Croatia, they are not subject to prosecution by the Croatian judiciary.
