= Dragoslav Bokan =

Serbian film director and writer

- Bokan in 2013
- Born: 15 February 1961 (age 65); Belgrade, PR Serbia, FPR Yugoslavia
- Education: XI Belgrade Gymnasium; University of Arts in Belgrade; University of Belgrade
- Occupations: Film director and writer
- Political party: SNO (1990–1992); SOS (1992–1993)
- Spouse: Željka Zdjelar
- Children: 6
- Military career
- Allegiance: White Eagles
- Service years: 1991–1992
- Rank: Commander
- Conflicts: Croatian War of Independence; Bosnian War

Dragoslav Bokan (Serbian Cyrillic: Драгослав Бокан, pronounced [drǎgoslaʋ bǒkan]; born 15 February 1961) is a Serbian film director, writer, politician and former paramilitary commander.

== Biography ==
Bokan was born in the Savski Venac area of Belgrade on 15 February 1961 to Serb parents Ilija and Milka (née Devetak). Several of his family members (including his maternal grandfather and great-grandfather) were killed at the Jasenovac concentration camp by the Ustashe, as part of an extermination campaign of Serbs during World War II.

After graduating from the XI Belgrade Gymnasium, Bokan graduated from the Department of Film and Television Directing under professor Aleksandar Mandić at the Faculty of Dramatic Arts and completed postgraduate studies at the Faculty of Philosophy.

In 1989, he directed three episodes on Visoki Dečani as part of the documentary series Svedoci vekova (Witnesses of the Centuries) produced by the broadcasting service RTB. Later that year, he moved to Port Chester, New York and a year later he returned to Serbia.

Back in Serbia, Bokan joined the Serbian National Renewal party. Bokan and Mirko Jović led the paramilitary section of the party known as the White Eagles. Some White Eagles members were convicted of war crimes and other atrocities, but not those under Bokan's command. On 23 April 1992, Bokan was arrested in Belgrade. He was accused of "possession of one hand grenade and four bullets found in his apartment" and was jailed for seven days. The trial lasted for a year and a half, and eventually resulted in a sentence of six months imprisonment. The arrest was an apparent effort to ease criticism of Serbia's role in the Bosnian War. After the arrest, Bokan and Jović went their separate ways.

In the early 1990s he worked for the Belgrade publishing company BIGZ and wrote for Pogledi. In 1992, he founded and led the Srpski otadžbinski savez (Serbian Fatherland Association) party and ran for the presidency of Serbia in the 1992 Serbian general election. The party however became defunct in 1993. Bokan was an uncredited screenwriter for the 1993 film Three Tickets to Hollywood. In an interview with The New York Times in April 1994, he was quoted as saying, "I don't believe in democracy because I don’t believe that any group at any time can change the course and goals of their ancestors."

Bokan was interviewed in the 1995 BBC documentary series The Death of Yugoslavia. A part of his interview from this series appears at the end of the Death in June song, "Lullaby to a Ghetto". In 2007, he created the Kosovo is Serbia billboard campaign with quotes from Willy Brandt, Winston Churchill, Charles de Gaulle, John F. Kennedy, and George Washington.

Bokan founded the Lepa Srbija, Rusija danas and Vodič za život magazines, and is a contributor to the Urban Book Circle. On 17 July 2014, he was named the Donetsk People's Republic representative in Serbia (with a one-year term) by Denis Pushilin, Chairman of the Supreme Council. For this, he was placed on a list of people banned from entering Ukraine.

=== Republika Srpska name claim ===
In a July 2014 interview for Press, Bokan revealed that he, Goran Marić (Plavi orkestar founder) and Sonja Karadžić (Radovan Karadžić's daughter) created the name Republika Srpska as had been requested of them by Velibor Ostojić, then-Minister of Information of the government of Republika Srpska.

=== Influences ===
Bokan has stated that he first gained interest in Serbian nationalism as a youngster after reading the tetralogy Vreme smrti by Dobrica Ćosić. Bokan has also been influenced by a number of authors and philosophers from the esoteric Traditionalist school of thought such as René Guénon, Dragoš Kalajić, Mircea Eliade, Julius Evola, Ezra Pound and Béla Hamvas along with Nouvelle Droite thinkers Robert Steuckers and Alain de Benoist. Bokan has also expressed admiration for Miloš Crnjanski, Milan Kašanin, Léon Bloy, Ivan Ilyin and politician Jean-Marie Le Pen after meeting with him in the early 1990s.

=== Controversies ===
Bokan has expressed nationalistic and far-right views. In January 2021, he was permanently suspended by Facebook. During his appearance on TV Pink on 29 November 2021, Bokan insulted opposition politician Marinika Tepić due to her Romanian descent and he declared her as the enemy of the people. A day later, he denied the fact that he insulted her and then proceeded to insult her again.

== Personal life ==
Bokan has six children. His first child died at the age of three days due to an injury caused by childbirth.

== Published books ==
In 1988, Bokan initiated the publishing and Serbian-language translation of On Heroes, Hero-Worship, and The Heroic in History by Thomas Carlyle.

He is also the author of the following books:

- Ognjeni ljiljani (1998)
- Portret mladog dendija (2000)
- Junaci srpskog ustanka (2004) – authored under the pseudonym Vuk Devetak
- Beograd, grad tajni (2004)
- Novi Sad: Od varoši do grada (2005)
- Kosovo je srce Srbije (2008)
- Politika: Mit, hronika, enciklopedija (2008)
- Srbija na prvom mestu (2022)
