= Tovarnik massacre =

- Part of the Croatian War of Independence
- Tovarnik on the map of Croatia, JNA/SAO Krajina-held areas in late 1991 are highlighted in red
- Location: Tovarnik, Croatia
- Date: 22 September 1991
- Target: Croats
- Attack type: Mass killing, ethnic cleansing
- Deaths: 80
- Perpetrators: JNA and local Serb rebels

The Tovarnik massacre was the mass murder of Croat civilians by the Yugoslav People's Army (JNA) and other Serb forces on 22 September 1991 in the village of Tovarnik.

== Background ==
During the September 1991 Yugoslav Campaign in Croatia, JNA forces and local Serb rebels from surrounding areas, attacked and occupied several villages in Eastern Slavonia and Croatian Syrmia (modern-day Vukovar-Srijem County) during the JNA-led offensive against Vukovar and adjacent areas.

The village of Tovarnik, on the border with Serbia, was located 25 kilometres from Vukovar. The JNA started to shell Tovarnik on 12 September 1991. An ultimatum was soon given to the residents of Tovarnik to surrender control of the village to the JNA. While negotiations were still ongoing, the JNA attacked and shelled the village on 20 September. The next day, the JNA entered the village with tanks.

== Killings ==
Once JNA forces, and other local Serb rebels, entered the village they immediately began to abuse and kill the remaining Croat inhabitants that had not been able to flee, 68 Croat civilians were killed on 22 September 1991. Among those killed in the aftermath was the village priest Ivan Burik.

According to the findings of the Belgrade-based Humanitarian Law Centre, a total of 80 local residents of Tovarnik were killed by JNA and other Serb forces, during and after the attack on the village.

In the months following the massacre, the local Croat civilian population that remained continued to be abused and persecuted. Croats were forced to wear white armbands to identify themselves. Civilians from Tovarnik and nearby areas continued to be psychologically and physically tortured, with some 300 civilians and POWs taken to nearby detention camps. The SAO Krajina soldiers had expelled 95% of the 2,500 Croat inhabitants by the end of 1991 and had destroyed 75% of the homes and buildings in the village.

== See also ==
- List of massacres in the Croatian War of Independence

== Notes ==
1. Killings continued sporadically until October 1991.
