= Vukašin Šoškoćanin =

Serbian war commander (1958–1991)

- Born: 24 June 1958; Borovo Selo, PR Croatia, FPR Yugoslavia
- Died: 15 May 1991 (aged 32); Danube River, SFR Yugoslavia
- Burial place: Bođani Monastery
- Military career
- Allegiance: SFR Yugoslavia; SAO Krajina
- Service years: 1990–1991
- Rank: Commander
- Nicknames: Vule, Šoša
- Conflicts: Croatian War; Battle of Borovo Selo

Vukašin Šoškoćanin (Serbian Cyrillic: Вукашин Шошкоћанин, pronounced [ʋukǎʃin ʃoʃkǒ:tɕanin]; 24 June 1958 – 15 May 1991) was a Croatian Serb paramilitary commander active during the early stages of the Croatian War of Independence.

== Biography ==
Born to Milan and Ljubica Šoškoćanin on 24 June 1958, Vukašin had two brothers, Radovan and Dušan. He became a member of the Serb Democratic Party in 1990. He was a veterinary technician in Vukovar. Šoškoćanin was president of the Borovo commune and commander of the Borovo Selo Territorial Defense during the early stages of the Croatian War of Independence, most notably during the Battle of Borovo Selo on 2 May 1991, in which twelve Croatian policemen were killed. He was a known associate of Serbian politician Vojislav Šešelj.

=== Death and legacy ===
At around 10:30 a.m. on 15 May 1991, while returning from a visit to a refugee camp in Vojvodina, Šoškoćanin died by drowning in the Danube in what was described as a boating accident.

Milan Paroški publicly questioned the official cause of death and claimed that frogmen (either the Yugoslav River Flotilla or the Serbian State Security) were responsible for Šoškoćanin's death. Paroški also claimed that Šoškoćanin was "an excellent swimmer." His death is still labeled under "mysterious circumstances."

After his death and during the occupation of the Croatian territory an elementary school in Borovo was named in his honour. He was posthumously awarded the title of "Hero of the People" by the Serbian authorities in occupied Beli Manastir on 25 September 1991.
