= Lovas, Croatia =

Lovas
- Municipality
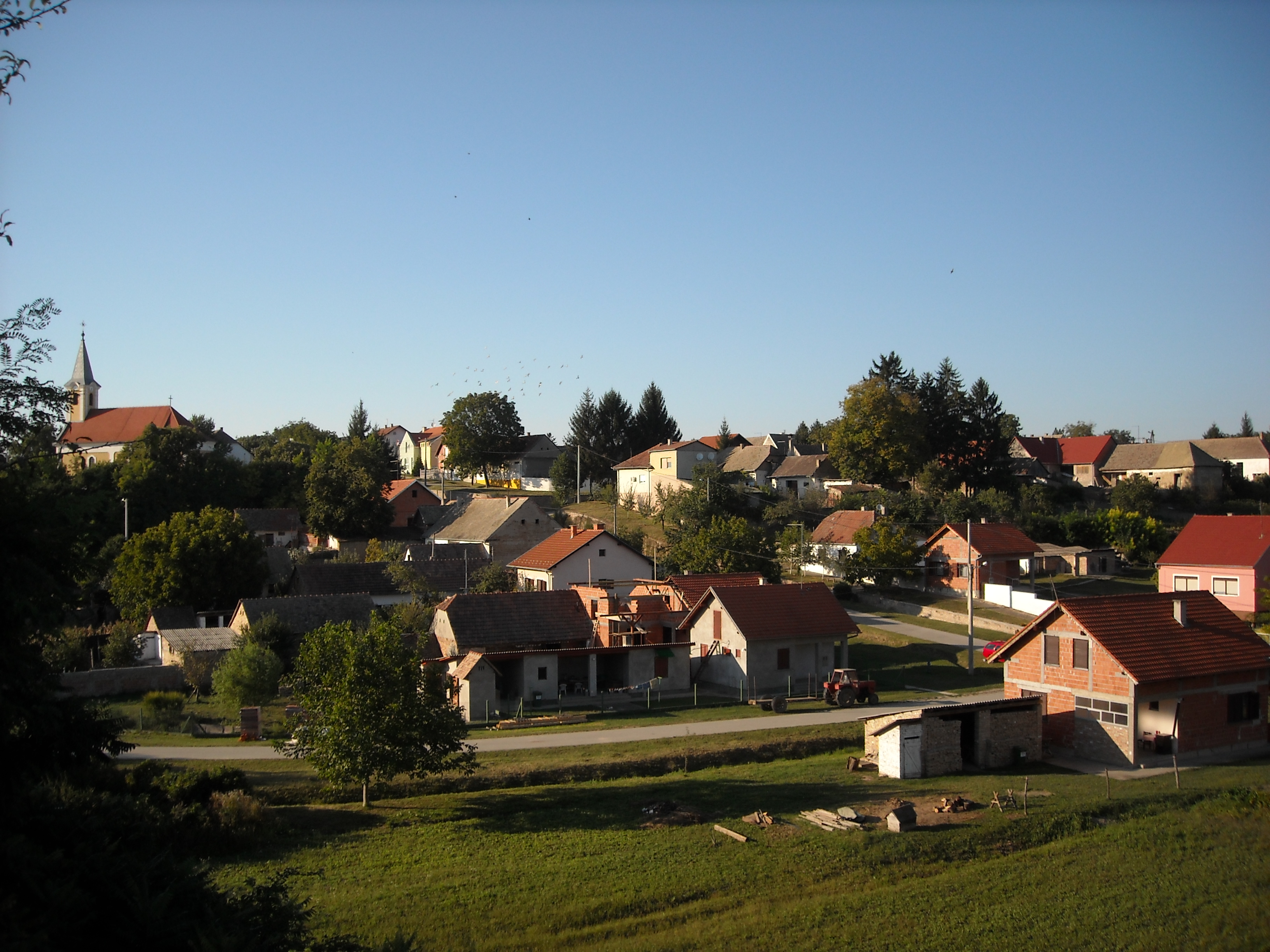
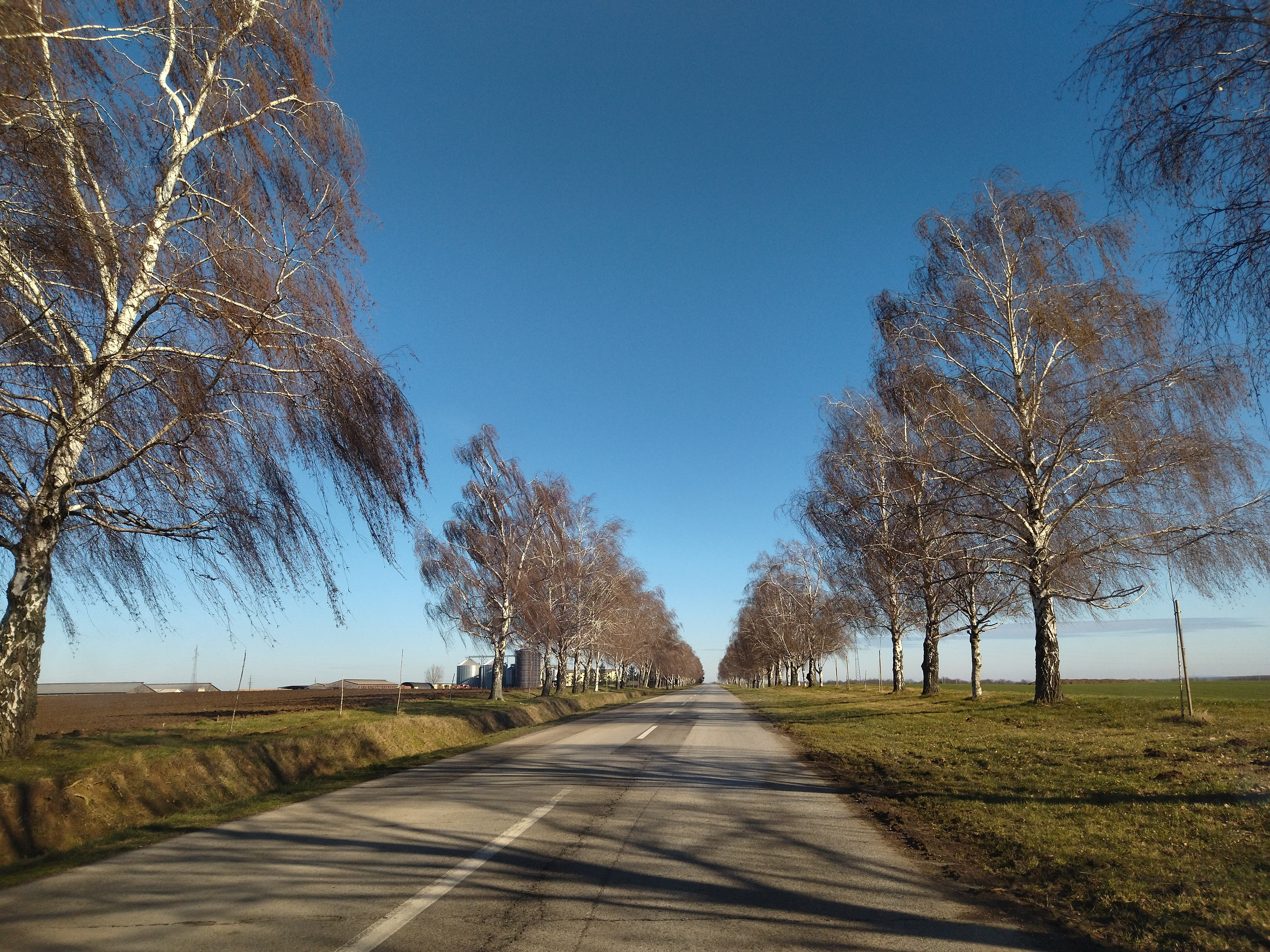
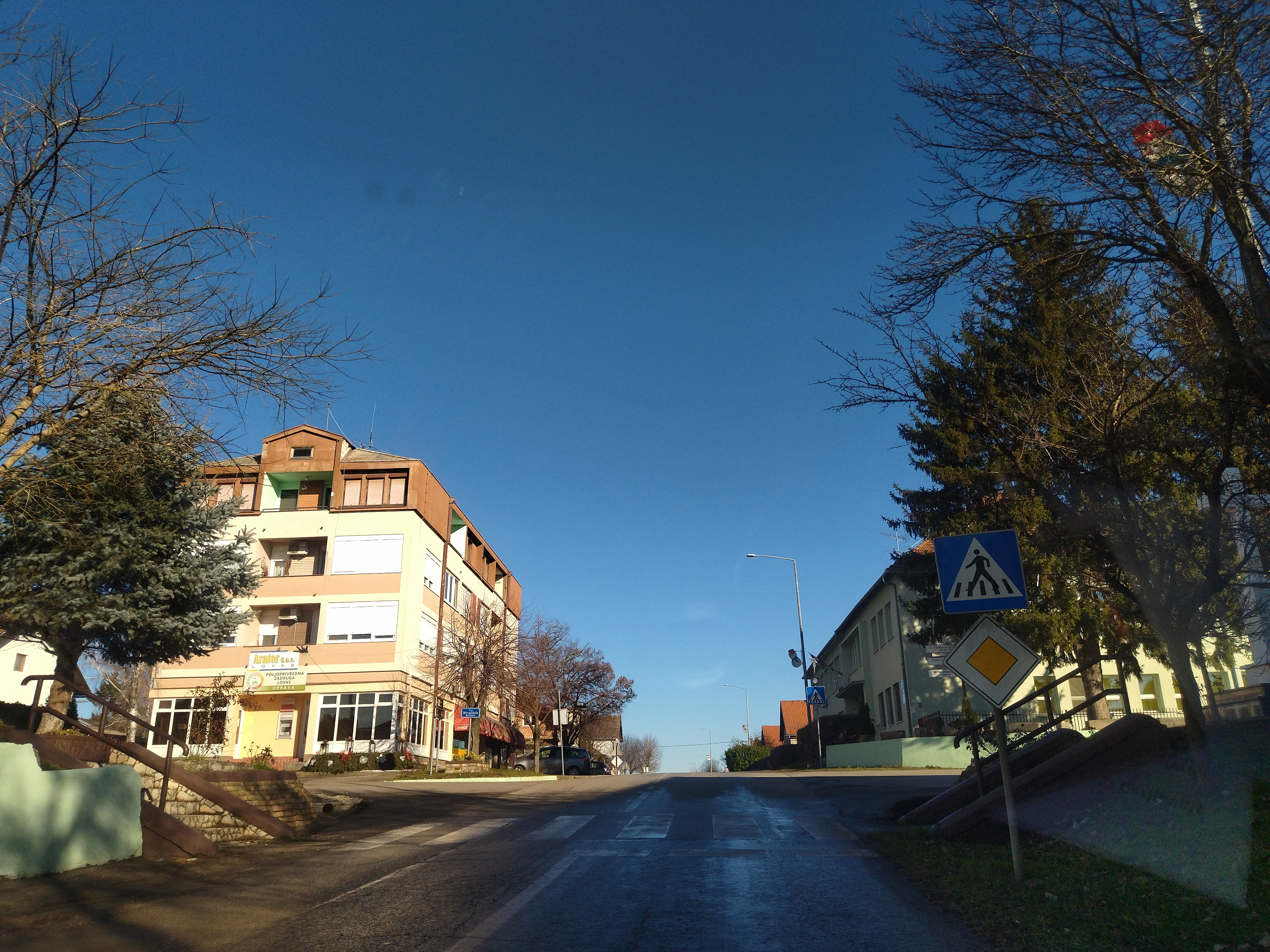
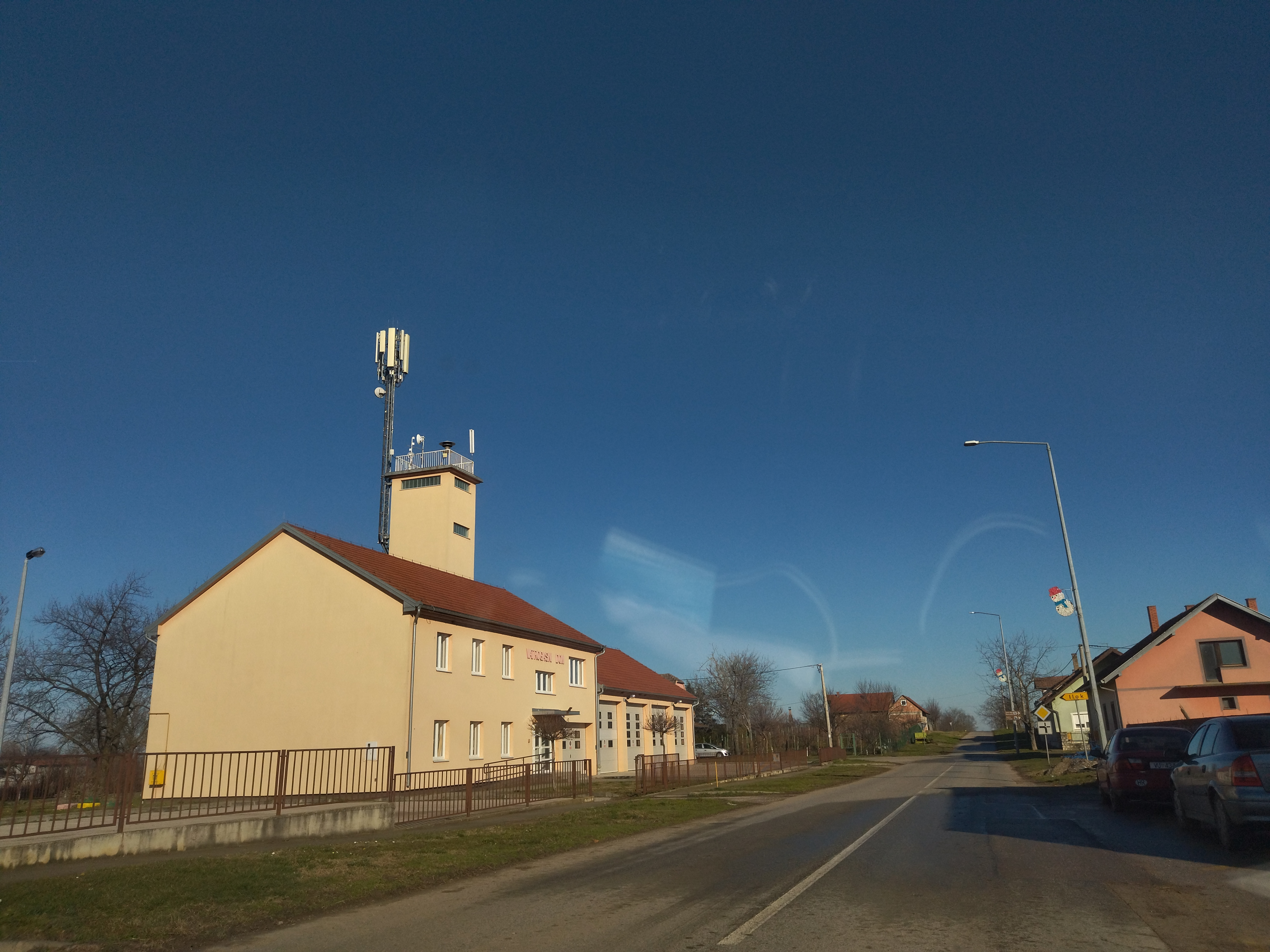
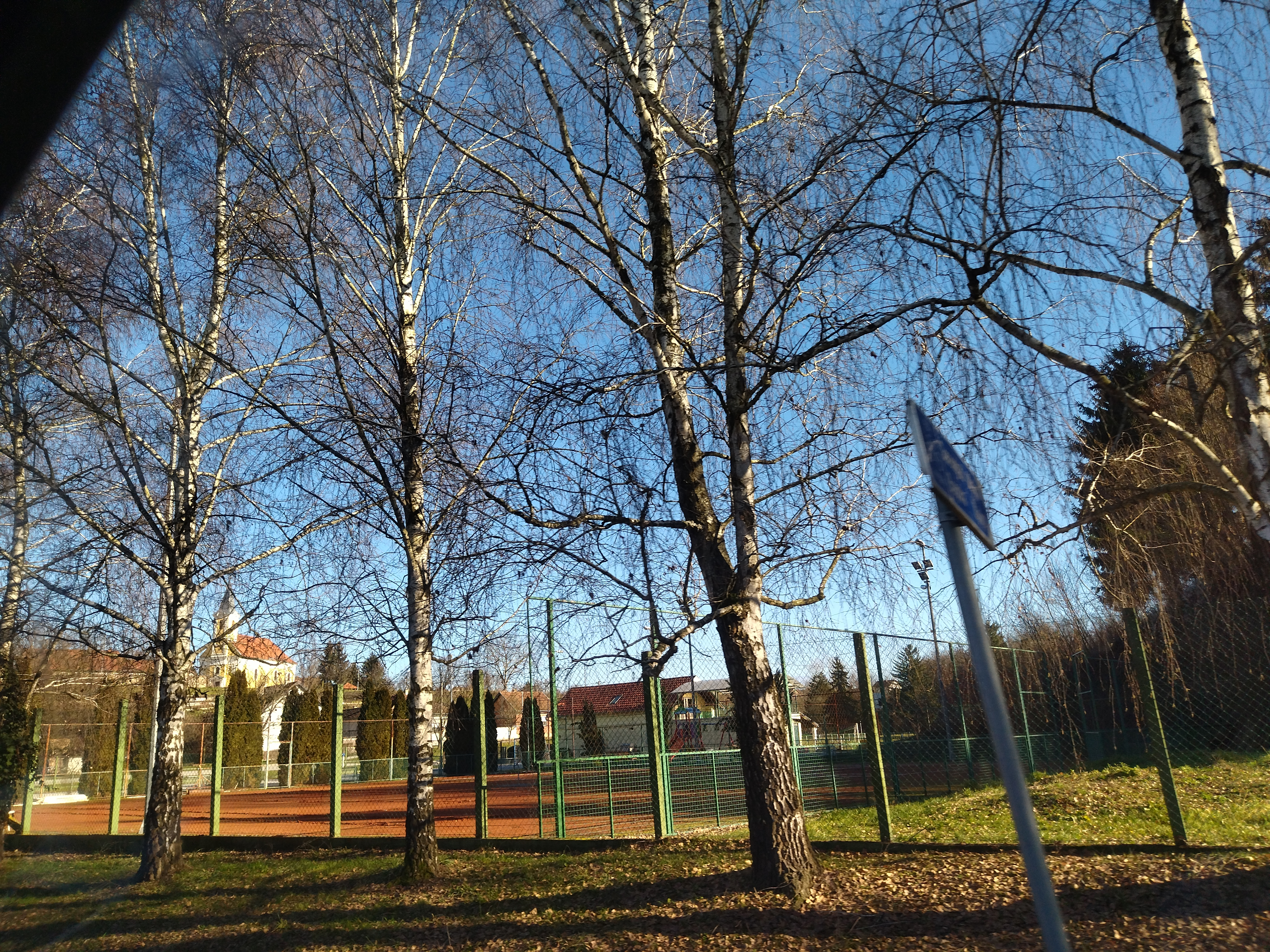
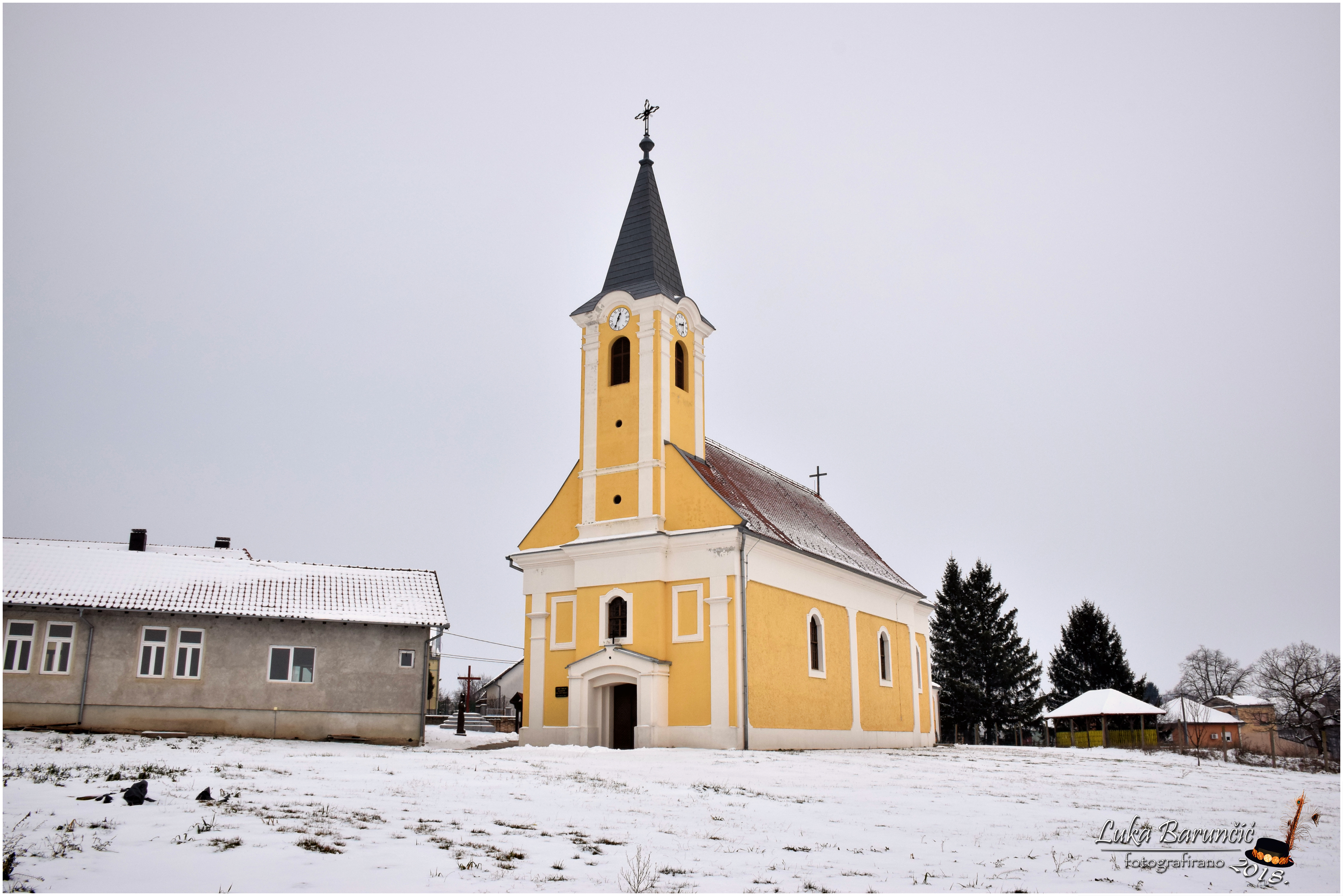

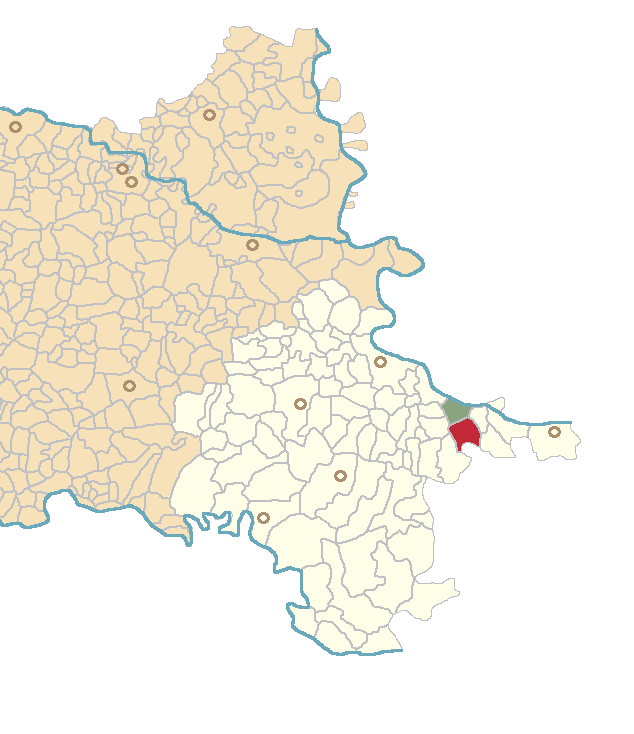

- Location in Croatia Lovas (Croatia) Lovas (Europe)
- Coordinates: 45°14′N 19°10′E
- Country: Croatia
- County: Vukovar-Syrmia County

Government
  - Municipal Mayor: Tanja Cirba (HDZ)

Area
  - Municipality: 42.6 km^{2} (16.4 sq mi)
  - Urban: 24.0 km^{2} (9.3 sq mi)

Population (2021)
  - Municipality: 980
  - Density: 23/km^{2} (60/sq mi)
  - Urban: 728
  - Urban density: 30.3/km^{2} (78.6/sq mi)
- Time zone: UTC+1 (CET)
  - Summer (DST): UTC+2 (CEST)
- Postal code: 32237
- Area code: 32
- Vehicle registration: VU
- Website: lovas.hr

Lovas (Hungarian: Hosszúlovász, Serbian Cyrillic: Ловас) is a village and seat of municipality in the Vukovar-Syrmia County of eastern Croatia, located on the slopes of Fruška Gora, a few kilometers south of the main road connecting Vukovar with Ilok. Lovas has a population of 1,214 (2011), and its municipality also includes the smaller village of Opatovac (pop. 345 in 2011) which is located to the north, at the Danube. Lovas is underdeveloped municipality which is statistically classified as the First Category Area of Special State Concern by the Government of Croatia.

== History ==
=== Early history ===
The first officially identified archaeological site at Lovas was located on the western edge of the village, at Kalvarija. Its position was documented in 1895 on the basis of stray finds that were sent to the Archaeological Museum in Zagreb. The finds continued arriving to the museum until 1900 and they were most often sent by the local priest to Josip Brunšmid, the director of the museum. It came as no surprise that Brunšmid was the first to publish a portion of the finds from Lovas in 1902, among which a copper dagger. In 1939 a Middle Bronze Age hoard was discovered in Lovas and handed to the Archaeological Museum in Zagreb, where it is still kept and displayed in the permanent exhibition of the prehistoric collection. In 1970 and 1972 small-scale field surveys were conducted with the goal of identifying the archaeological sites in the area. In this period the three best-known sites were identified at Kalvarija, Orlinac and Staro groblje (“Old Cemetery”). Surveys confirmed the inhabitance of these locations from the Neolithic until the Medieval period. In 1975 the construction work in the village uncovered the remains of inhabitance in the Neolithic, Copper Age (Baden Culture) and Early Iron Age in Vladimir Nazor street. The same construction work revealed an Early Iron Age necropolis in Ante Starčević street.

Another village in Lovas Municipality, Opatovac, is almost equally rich in archaeological finds. The first finds, dating exclusively to the Copper Age, were reported already in 1911 in the former vineyard of Friedrich Königsdorf. In 1962 an Early Iron Age settlement and necropolis were reported at Fruškogorska street number 6. One of the latest confirmed findings was that of the Vučedol Culture pottery in 2002, somewhere near the bank of the river Danube.

==== The Lovas Hoard ====
The Lovas Hoard was discovered in October 1939. It was ploughed out from the soil by Zdravko Plaščević while he was working on his fields. The exact location and circumstances of the discovery remained unknown for years. However, the City Museum in Vukovar keeps a record of Mr. A. Dorn who mentions the "land of Zdravko Plaščević" on Gradac as one of the known archaeological sites in Lovas. However, that the use of the toponym Gradac in Lovas is somewhat problematic, since it is used to describe different locations or as a common term for the locations Kalvarija, Orlinac and Staro groblje ("Old Cemetery"), all confirmed archaeological sites.

The Lovas Hoard contained a significant number of bronze and gold objects. The entire hoard was originally located inside of a larger ceramic vessel, as reported by Mr. Plaščević, but the vessel was unfortunately not preserved. Gold objects, or more precisely jewelry, were placed within a smaller black jar with two handles (a sort of a "kantharos"). The discovered objects were handed to Mr. Viktor Hoffiler, the director of the Archaeological Museum in Zagreb at the time. This was the beginning of the close affiliation of the archaeology in Lovas with the Archaeological Museum in Zagreb. The hoard itself did not become the subject of scientific discussion until 1956, and it was properly published only in 1958 by Mr. Zdenko Vinski, an employee of the Archaeological Museum in Zagreb and an expert in Medieval Archaeology.

On the basis of bronze and ceramic finds, the hoard can be dated to the Middle Bronze Age period and it has been attributed to the late Vatin or Belegiš I culture. Interestingly, a similar hoard of the same dating, but not as rich in deposited objects, was discovered in the city of Vukovar. It was found in Mala ulica ("Little Street") in Vukovar at the end of the 19th century. In 1897 the hoard was acquired by Josip Brunšmid, the director of the Archaeological Museum in Zagreb at the time. The circumstances of its discovery remain unknown. Therefore, it is quite possible that it contained more objects than are known today.

In 2011 the team of the Archaeological Museum in Zagreb, discovered the location where the Lovas Hoard was possibly found. The team learned from local inhabitants that the possible site of the hoard should be sought in a location called Čajer, located on another elevated position west of the village Lovas. Čajer is not adjacent to Gradac, which was originally thought to be the location of the hoard. Fragments of ceramic vessels dating to the Bronze Age were also found at Čajer. The connection between this area and the hoard was further strengthened by the 2011 survey and 2017 excavation. More precisely, on the same plateau, but some 1,5 km to the north at Kovači ("Smiths"), the museum's research team discovered settlement remains dating to the same phase of the Middle Bronze Age as the Lovas Hoard.

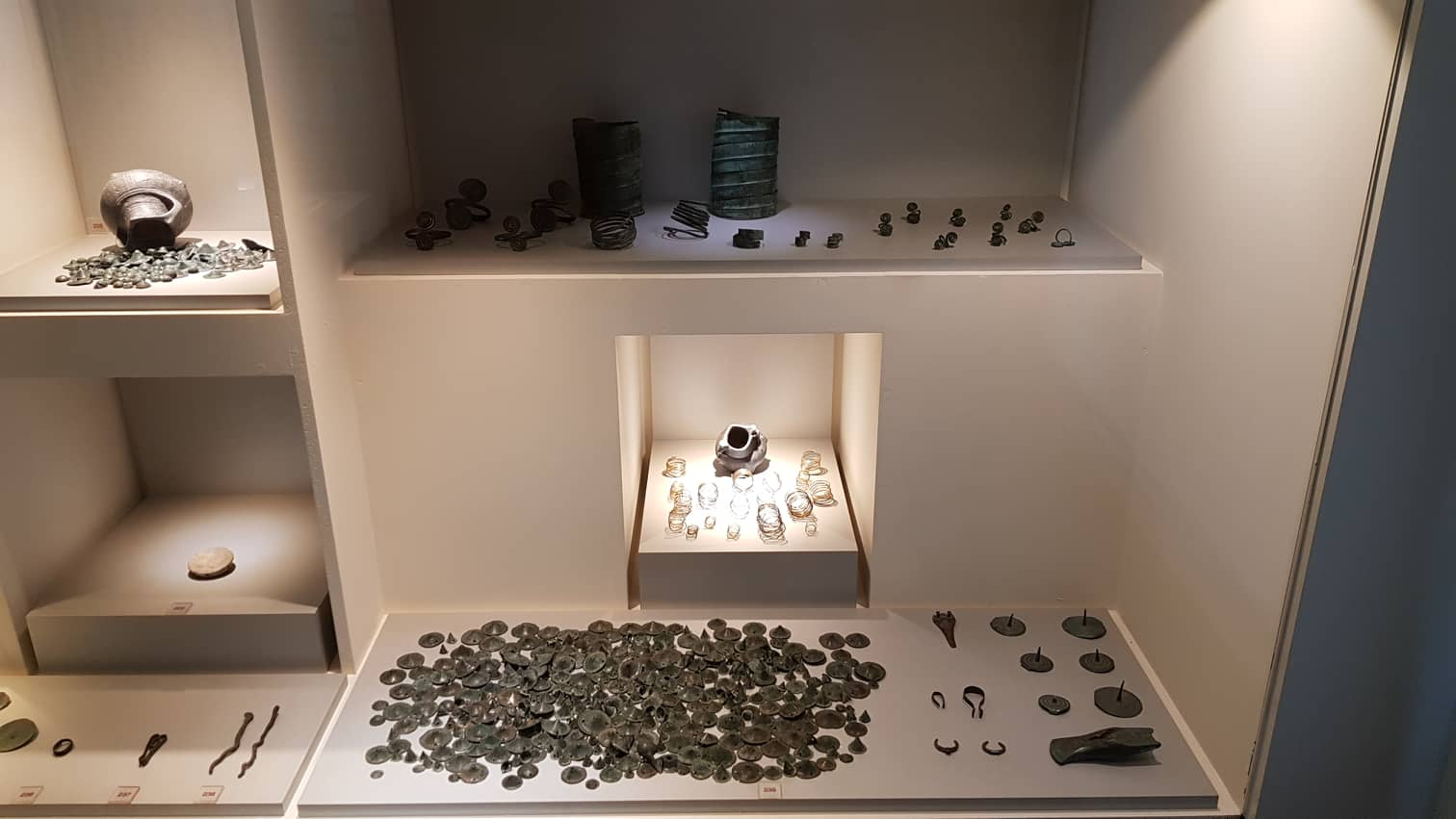
The Lovas Hoard is kept and displayed in the permanent exhibition of the Archaeological Museum in Zagreb (photo: P. Pavuk, Archaeological Museum in Zagreb, 2018).

==== Results of the recent research ====
In 2011 the team of the Archaeological museum in Zagreb opened additional test trenches in two different locations where archaeological sites have been reported in the past – Kalvarija and Staro groblje ("Old Cemetery"). In addition to these two sites, archaeological remains were identified in 12 other locations (Orlinac, Kragino voće, Brzovac, U mjestu, Staro selo, Čajer, Čot, Šljivici, Gradac, Sveti Mihovil, Srednje brdo - jug and Kovači), dating from the Neolithic to the Medieval period. The most important was the discovery of the site Kovači, which was, according to the distribution of surface pottery finds, the largest and most significant prehistoric settlement in the Lovas Municipality. It was inhabited during the periods of Copper, Middle Bronze and Late Iron Age.

Five test trenches were laid at Kalvarija, on the plateau overlooking the village of Lovas from the southwest. Based on the analysis of the ceramic remains, the site was inhabited during the Copper, Bronze and Late Iron Age, as well as in the Roman and Medieval period. Two test trenches were opened at Staro groblje ("Old Cemetery"). The finds of Middle Bronze and Late Iron Age pottery confirm that the area was inhabited throughout history. The validity of the name Staro groblje ("Old Cemetery") is confirmed by the sporadic finds of human bones, which probably originate from destroyed graves.

During the survey in 2017, four new locations with archaeological sites were identified (Srednje brdo – sjever, Srednje brdo – centar, Kavane – sjever and Orašje). Based on the ceramic finds, the sites were probably inhabited from the Neolithic until the Medieval period. Test trenches were opened on two different locations in 2017. Three test trenches were opened at Orlinac, just south of Staro groblje ("Old Cemetery"), which was excavated in 2011. All three trenches produced archeological material, mostly pottery, dated to the Bronze and Late Iron Age. More significant is the discovery of two Modern Age graves (probably 18th-19th century) in trench 1. Grave 1 contained the remains of a 30-35-year-old male individual. His head was oriented towards the northeast. Grave 2 contained the remains of 35-40-year-old female individual, whose head was oriented towards the southwest. Her hands were placed on her chest and she was holding a small bronze cross in them, originally placed on a string. The discovery of the two graves confirmed that the original cemetery was not positioned only at Staro groblje ("Old Cemetery"), but also extended southward to Orlinac. Trench 2 located at Orlinac uncovered a ditch or a large pit dating to the Late Iron Age. Among the typical Late Iron Age pottery, several fragments of Roman pottery were identified, which suggests that the layers could be dated into the late phases of the Late Iron Age. The site Orlinac must have been inhabited already in the Bronze Age, as confirmed by the sporadic finds of Bronze Age pottery within the Late Iron Age layers.

The second excavated site was at Kovači ("Smiths"). This site was discovered during the 2011 survey and proved to be the largest prehistoric site in the area. Only one test trench was opened on the site, but it confirmed the dating indicated by the ceramic remains visible on the surface. The earliest inhabitance at Kovači probably dates to the Copper Age, as confirmed by the pottery fragments associated with the Baden and Kostolac Cultures. The most significant inhabitance of the site dates to the Middle Bronze Age and can be associated with the Belegiš I Culture. It seems that the inhabitants of the settlement produced and buried the famous Lovas Hoard, which dates to the same period and was found 1-1,5 km south of the settlement. The discovered building material, which once belonged to the houses, and the significant amount of half-complete ceramic vessels, textile tools, lithics and metal finds confirmed that the site was once a Bronze Age settlement. The Late Iron Age represents the last period of inhabitance here.

In 2018 the research focused on the northeastern part of the Lovas Municipality, more precisely the area southeast of the village Opatovac. The chosen area is an elevated plateau bordered by the streams Čopinac on its eastern side and Bečka on the southern. The position is interesting because the slopes of the plateau are the habitat of the protected bee-eater bird. At least three new archaeological sites were identified in 2018. The first discovered site is located in the northern part of Čopinac, on the highest point of the plateau. However, the entire slope following the direction of the stream Čopinac was covered with pottery fragments and small finds from different periods of the human past. The center of this settlement was probably located on the highest position of the plateau in its northern part, which is confirmed by the highest density of pottery fragments and small finds exactly in this area. The pottery fragments collected here date to the Copper, Middle Bronze and Late Iron Age. The second site was discovered in the eastern part of the site Bečka. The site was probably inhabited in Copper Age, Bronze Age, Late Iron Age, Roman and Medieval periods. The third site was identified in the southern part of the site Bečka. Based on the pottery finds, the site probably inhabited in the Neolithic, Copper Age, Bronze Age, Late Iron Age, Roman and Medieval periods.

=== Later history ===
The village of Lowas in Feudal times was in the District of Vukovar a village belonging to the Eltz family. It was the home of Croats, Hungarians, Serbs, and Germans.

=== Recent history ===
Lovas was almost completely destroyed during the Croatian War of Independence when the villages were attacked by and later invaded by the Serbian forces. Lovas was a village of 1,681 at the time, mostly Croats (85.7%), with some Serbs (7.9%) and others (6.4%). Opatovac was populated by 550 people, of which there were 43.4% Croats, 26.2% Serbs, 21.1% Magyars, and 9.5% others.

In Lovas, 261 houses were completely destroyed, and all others were damaged, whereas in Opatovac, 15 homes were destroyed and fifty-odd others were damaged. Most of the damage was caused by Serbian bombing prior to the occupation, while some was caused afterwards.

Lovas was captured on October 10, 1991, and Opatovac on October 14. On October 11, a group of 51 Croats was forced to enter a mine field just outside Lovas in order to "clear" it, causing death to 21 of them and injury to another 14. Another 19 people were killed in the village the same day.

The Serbian army occupied a building in the village and used it as an improvised jail. There, the non-Serb population was mistreated to the extent of atrocity - men and women were arrested and subsequently beaten and molested with any and all instruments at their captors' disposal - from crowbars to knives to electrodes. Those Croats who remained were forced to wear white arm bands as a sign of racial recognition.

The Catholic church of St. Michael in Lovas, a 250-year-old building, was set on fire and later completely destroyed by explosives. The chapel of St. Florian at the Lovas graveyard was also set ablaze and devastated. The Catholic Church in Opatovac was pillaged and damaged. Later, in the center of Lovas, four adjacent family houses were unlawfully destroyed to make way for a new Orthodox church building.

The buildings of the Hrvatski dom (community house, lit. "Croatian home") and the municipality were also destroyed. Numerous private barns, warehouses and other buildings were destroyed, the "Borovo" factory was burned, the agricultural company "Lovas" immovable property (driers, silo) was destroyed as well, while the movable machines were stolen and transferred to Serbia. In Opatovac, the oil company INA's dispatch centre was badly damaged by rockets, as was the VUPIK plant Opatovac-Pustara.

A total of 1,661 people became refugees because of all this, of which 1,341 from Lovas and 320 from Opatovac. After the war, a mass grave was exhumed near the village cemetery, with 68 bodies, and another ten bodies were found in assorted graves around the village. These people were officially buried properly on March 21, 1998.

As a result of the war, a total of 83 villagers of Lovas lost their lives and four are still listed as missing. In Opatovac, two people are dead, and one is missing. After the war ended, almost two thirds of the Serbs moved out of the villages, reducing their number to 106. The number of Magyars was cut by almost one half as well (77). There are also 335 fewer Croats in the municipality.

== Politics ==
=== Minority councils ===
Directly elected minority councils and representatives are tasked with consulting tasks for the local or regional authorities in which they are advocating for minority rights and interests, integration into public life and participation in the management of local affairs. At the 2023 Croatian national minorities councils and representatives elections Serbs of Croatia fulfilled legal requirements to elect 10 members minority councils of the Lovas Municipality.
