= Media freedom in Serbia =

2026 World Press Freedom Index Good: >85 points Satisfactory: 70–85 points Problematic: 55–70 points Difficult: 40–55 points Very serious: <40 points Not classified

Censorship in Serbia is prohibited by the Constitution. Freedom of expression and of information are protected by international and national law, even if the guarantees enshrined in the laws are not coherently implemented. Instances of censorship and self-censorship are still reported in the country.

Serbia is deemed "partly free" by Freedom House and ranks 93rd out of 180 countries in the 2020 Press Freedom Index report compiled by Reporters Without Borders, declining its ranking by three if compared to 2019, fourteen if compared to 2018 and 24 places if compared to 2017. In 2018, International Research & Exchanges Board described the situation in the media in Serbia as the worst in recent history, and that Media Sustainability Index dropped because the most polarized media in almost 20 years, an increase in fake news and editorial pressure on media.

Within the framework of negotiations with the European Union, the EU has requested that Serbia improve and guarantee freedom of expression and of the press. According to Christian Mihr of Reporters Without Borders, "as a candidate country [Serbia] must seriously understand the importance of the independence of journalists and the need for freedom of the media."

== Legislative framework ==
Serbia is part of the European Convention on Human Rights and of the UN International Covenant on Civil and Political Rights, both imposing obligations to protect freedom of expression and information.

The Constitution of Serbia guarantees freedom of expression (including freedom of speech and press) and allows for its restriction only "to protect the rights and reputation of others, to uphold the authority and objectivity of the courts and to protect public health, morals of a democratic society and national security of the Republic of Serbia" - as in compliance with the standards set by the European Convention on Human Rights.

While the law does not include a specific provision on hate speech, it is a criminal offense in Serbia to "incite" national, racial, or religious intolerance. In June 2011 the Constitutional Court banned the extreme right-wing organization Nacionalni Stroj (National Front) for promoting racist hate speech.

It is a Constitutional right, in Serbia, to freely establish media without prior authorization. Licenses, required for TV and radio stations, are granted by an independent body, the Republic Broadcasting Agency (RBA). Censorship is prohibited by the Constitution.

The legislative framework on the media in Serbia includes a Law on Public Information, a Law on Broadcasting, a Law on Free Access to Information of Public Importance and a Law on Elections of the Members of the Parliament (regulating electoral coverage). The Criminal Code still stipulates fines for insult, even after the abolishment of criminal defamation provisions. In 2013 the Criminal Code was amended to include a specific reference, in art.138(3), to the endangerment of "persons discharging duties of public importance in the area of public information related to his/her duties", which official sources confirmed was meant to include journalists. Statistics about prosecutions in 2014 show that 10 cases, out of 4,080 criminal offenses recorded in the year, pertained to art.138(3); of these, 2 led to indictment and one to a conviction.

Based on the 2011 Serbian Media Strategy, a new set of laws regulating media in the country has been adopted in 2014. It includes the Act on Public Information and Media, the Act on Public Service Media and the Act on Electronic Media.

The main novelties introduced by the Act on Public Information and Media included the obligation to carry out the privatization, by July 2015, of media which were still state-owned. Along with this, the Act also introduced a Media Registry conceived as a tool for transparency of media ownership. The Act also defines the possibility and procedures to co-finance media projects via public funds.

The Act on Electronic Media harmonizes Serbian national legislation with the standards included in the EU Audiovisual Media Services Directive in the fields of hate speech, accessibility of audiovisual services for people with disabilities and protection of minors.

== Attacks and threats against journalists ==
Serbia's Independent Association of Journalists (NUNS) reported at least 34 physical and verbal attacks against journalists in Serbia in 2015; its General Secretary Svetozar Rakovic said that "the humiliation of journalists by government officials has reached its peak this year". OSCE media advisor Miroslav Jankovic reported in December 2015 that "At least three journalists are under permanent police protection in Serbia, which speaks for itself that the institutions had yet to face their past."

Between January and August 2014, Serbia had witnessed 28 cases of threats and intimidations against journalists - of which 5 physical assaults and 3 death threats - on a par with 2013 (23) and in decline from 2012 (33). The response of the authorities, according to Human Rights Watch, "was weak at best, negligent at worst".

Journalists have denounced reiterated violence and menaces, coupled with impunity for the perpetrators. Investigative journalists working on war crimes and radical religious groups have denounced how authorities downplayed the seriousness of the threats they received online. Cases of arbitrary financial and administrative inspections by official authorities, deemed of a harassing or intimidating character against critical reporting, have also been mentioned, with one specific case in Niš. High-ranking public officials have been participating in smear campaigns, including - as reported by HRW - Serbia's prime minister Aleksandar Vucic, publicly accusing journalists of acting on behalf of foreign interests.

The cases reported include:

- Slavko Ćuruvija, murdered in 1999 together with two other journalists, Milan Pantić, and Dada Vujasinovic. The Serbian government began a review on 24 January 2013 of several suspicious cases involving the alleged murders of journalists, including the three of them. Four former members of the Security Services were indicted for the murder of Ćuruvija, including the former security service chief Radomir Markovic. Three of them are in pre-trial custody.
- Vladimir Mitric, investigative journalist, who suffered an attempted murder by a former police officer in 2005, when he was investigating about drug trafficking in the Drina valley and has lived under police protection since, without being able to continue his work. The perpetrator, after six years in court, received a one-year sentence and was then granted an amnesty.
- Dejan Anastasijevic, journalist for Vreme, suffered an attempted murder on 13 April 2007. Investigations were unable to apprehend the culprits.
- Brankica Stanković, journalist at radio and TV broadcaster B92, complained about death threats she received after broadcasting documentaries on corruption in Serbian football, but the courts merely treated them as insults or defamation and rejected further complaints.
- Teofil Pančić, columnist for the weekly Vreme, was attacked with a metal bar in Belgrade on 24 July 2010. He was a usual critic of nationalism, corruption and hooliganism in sport.
- Predrag Blagojević, editor-in-chief of Južne Vesti, who received death threats in March 2013 after having exposed alleged corruption in Niš' city heating company, and again in March 2014 by a football club owner (both trials still pending).
- Dragan Marinkovć, journalist at Televizija Leškovac, was threatened on social media after exposing failures in the readiness of ambulance services
- Davor Pašalić, beaten twice by three assailants in a single night in July 2014. The attack was publicly condemned by OSCE's media freedom representative.
- Stefan Cvetković, a journalist who investigated the murder of the Kosovo Serb opposition politician Oliver Ivanović, has been attacked and beaten in a café in the centre of Bela Crkva. Two years earlier, the Deputy Mayor of Bela Crkva threatened him and broke his mobile phone.
- Milan Jovanović, an investigative reporter who has covered corruption involving local politicians, whose house burned down in a fire started by a Molotov cocktail in December 2018.
- Tatjana Vojtehovski, a well-known investigative reporter who often criticizes president Vučić, was the target of death threats and rape threats on Twitter at the end of December 2018, in which threats were also made against her daughter.
- N1, a cable news channel have been facing a targeted campaign of pressures and threats by state official. Workers have been constantly labelled as "traitors" and "foreign mercenaries" and received hundreds of insults and threats of physical violence through social media. TV station received a letter on 4 February 2019 threatening to kill the journalists and their families and to blow up the office.
- Vladimir Petković, journalist at Glas Zaječara, was attacked in Zaječar on 5 February 2019; an unknown man hit him with a can and beat him, with comments on the badge with One of Five million slogan.

== Political interference ==
The European Commission has stated in its 2012, 2013 and 2014 Progress Reports that political and financial interference has a detrimental effect on the independence of the media in Serbia.

The conditions of the market are deemed conducive to self-censorship by journalists and media outlets. Serbian media remain dependent on advertisement, of which market from 23 to 40% is constituted by state funding, whose process of allocation is deemed opaque and politicised, in the lack of an independent body tasked with the supervision of public spending on advertising. Free media reliance on state-funded advertisements thus makes them prone to a lack of critical scrutiny of governmental actions, for fear of losing precious sources of revenues. Political interference also takes more direct forms, with high-ranking politicians influencing editorial choices.

According to Christian Mihr, executive director of Reporters Without Borders, "censorship in Serbia is neither direct nor transparent, but is easy to prove." According to Mihr, "it can be seen that the authorities have very negative attitudes toward media freedom. Also, there are numerous examples of censorship and self-censorship," According to Mihr, "articles that were critical of the government were deleted from the Internet, while independent journalists were either threatened or pressured." He recalled how during the May 2014 floods some articles were taken off websites, while the government "attacked several critical reports" of the official response to the natural events. According to Mihr, Serbian prime minister Aleksandar Vucic has proved "very sensitive to criticism, even on critical questions," as was the case with Natalija Miletic, correspondent for Deutsche Welle Radio, who questioned him in Berlin about the media situation in Serbia and about allegations that some ministers in the Serbian government had plagiarized their diplomas, and who later received threats and offensive articles on the Serbian press.

Serbia's Independent Association of Journalists (NUNS) endorsed RWB's report. According to a survey by NUNS in December 2014, 40% of 585 Serbian journalists reported being occasionally subjected to censorship, while 48% believed their colleagues occasionally self-censor their work. Another survey, by Germany's Konrad Adenauer Stiftung, from September 2014, remarked that more than 90% of journalists polled said both censorship and self-censorship are present in the Serbian media; 73% agreed that Serbian media lack objectivity, and 95% that reporting is rarely critical.

In 2017, Freedom House reported that Serbia posted one of the largest single-year declines in press freedom among all the countries and territories. Also, they emphasized that Vučić had sought to squeeze critical media out of the market and discredit the few journalists with the funds and fortitude to keep working. According to Amnesty International report, freedom of independent media has been severely curtailed since the election of Vučić as Prime Minister and interference in the media has intensified and become personalized through public attacks on journalists critical of the government.

Five Serbian journalists' and media associations described in a joint report the incident which took place on 19 October 2018 when Aleksandar Vučić, president of Serbia first called a RTS broadcaster by her name and "insulted and humiliated her", and then turned to N1 journalist who had asked him not to put pressure on colleagues from the RTS. In 2018, International Research & Exchanges Board described the situation in the media in Serbia as the worst in recent history. They, also, pointed out that the judiciary responds promptly only in cases in which the media allegedly violates the rights of authorities and ruling parties. The increased government control of the media comes as Serbian journalists face more political pressure and intimidation, in 2018 the Independent Association of Serbian Journalists recorded the highest number of attacks against journalists in decade. According to Serbian investigative journalism portal Crime and Corruption Reporting Network, more than 700 fake news were published on the front pages of pro-government tabloids during 2018. Many of them were about alleged attacks on Vućić and attempts of coups, as well as messages of support to him by Vladimir Putin. The best-selling newspaper in Serbia is the pro-government tabloid Informer, which most often presents Vučić as a powerful person under constant attack, and also has anti-European content and pro-war rhetoric.

- Predrag Blagojevic, a journalist from Niš' Južne Vesti, was accused by the deputy mayor of being a foreign agent. Blagojevic was then subject to threats on social media. The police are investigating on the case.
- In late 2012, Niš' Južne Vesti newspaper was subject to surprise administrative inspections after reporting a series of critical stories on political leaders.
- Media close to the governments have dismissed critical journalists. Srđan Škoro, chief editor of the Belgrade daily Večernje Novosti (owned for one third by the state), was removed in Spring 2014. Professional associations have denounced this as politically motivated and due to Škoro's criticism of Vučić's party on the public radio.
- After the May 2014 floodings, the government established a state of emergency allowing it to detain citizens for "inciting panic". Police detained 3 journalists and questioned 20 more.
- In August 2014 BIRN's investigation on governmental overpayment for Air Serbia shares (published in Vreme) was publicly dismissed by PM Vučić as based on inaccurate documents and backed by corrupteed tycoons.
- Four popular political talk TV programmes were cancelled in 2014. In October 2014, B92 cancelled the renowned political talk show by Olja Bećković, running since 24 years and well known for its critical scrutiny of all governments since. This came after Bečković had thoroughly interviewed the prime minister Aleksandar Vučić in October 2013. The anchorwoman recalls having received an angry call from Vucic afterwards, and having been boycotted by SNS politicians since. B92 later decided to shift to entertainment, and announced it would start broadcasting from the same studio as the public broadcaster.
- In January 2015, BIRN was publicly criticised and smeared by PM Vucic after their exposure of alleged corruption in the state energy company Elektroprivreda Srbije. Vucic called BIRN "liars" and accused them of being paid by the EU ambassador to criticise him. He later repeated the accusation of "telling lies", justifying his attack in order to "protect Serbia from falsehood".
- Danica Vučenić, anchorwoman of RTV Vojvodina's talk show Jedan na jedan left her job in March 2015 after what she described as political pressures, due to having invited Olja Bečković as a guest in her show in October 2014. Vučenić claimed to having been boycotted by SNS politicians, thus being "forced to be one-sided in my reporting", and having then decided to leave journalism "because there is no space for independent journalists".
- In early 2015, Serbia's prime minister Vucic was criticized in two occasions by the EU Commission's spokesperson Maja Kocijancic, in relation to the government's criticisms of BIRN, and to its treatment of Ombudsman Sasa Jankovic. On 10 January 2015 Vucic claimed that a report by BIRN on the dewatering of the Tamnava mine was the work of "liars" paid by Brussels to undermine his government. Kocijancic stated being "very much surprised" by Vucic's claim "that the EU is paying individual organisations to wage a campaign against the Serbian government". Instead, she remarked that "media criticism (such as that of BIRN) is essential to ensure the proper accountability of elected governments," and that "governments should in turn be ready to act on such criticism in a constructive and transparent fashion, rather than trying to stifle it," recalling how "the EU expects the Serbian authorities to ensure an environment supporting freedom of expression and of media". On 9 February 2015, Vucic and Eu Commissioner Johannes Hahn met in Brussels and stated that they had overcome any disagreements. Hahn dismissed the concerns about media freedom in Serbia raised by the RWB report, asking about "proof and evidence" to follow it up. Hahn's attitude was rebuked by RWB and NUNS; NUNS' Dragan Janjic stated that "Our conclusions are different from those of Mr Hahn. We make our assessments on media freedom based on the insight we receive from journalists,"
- In December 2015 and January 2016 journalists in Serbia organised strikes and demonstrations to protest against the perceived intensification of political pressures coming from the Serbian Progressive Party (SNS). In December, the defence minister Bratislav Gašić had insulted a woman journalist with B92 TV by saying "I like these female journalists who kneel down so easily". NUNS called for his resignation after the sexist remark, but Vučić denied. Journalists organised a protest movement, under the slogan "Journalists don't kneel" (Novinarke ne klece), also calling for investigation into illegal surveillance of journalists ordered by interior minister Nebojsa Stefanovic. Press photographers also protested against a draft law - then rejected - that would have removed copyright protection from their works. The Independent Journalists Association of Serbia (NUNS) also denounced that journalists in the town of Pancevo are "obliged" to join the ruling party not to lose their job. Independent journalists reported being smeared and portrayed as "foreign mercenaries". Journalists complained about being "insulted, badly paid and fired". PM Vučić described the protests as an "attempt to destabilize" Serbia, ahead of the snap election he called for April 2016.
- In 2018, the Ministry of Culture and Information drafted a media strategy which included "public media services", which was dropped after protests.

=== Radio Television of Vojvodina case ===
Parliamentary elections in Serbia in April 2016 caused a shift in power in Vojvodina and Serbian Progressive Party won a majority like it already had on a national level. One week later, when the results were revealed, Managing Board of public broadcasting service Radio Television of Vojvodina (RTV) decided to release program director Slobodan Arezina.

Concerned that those kind of personal changes could undermine the hard-earned reputation, more than 40 journalists and editors signed an open letter to public, defending the principles and trying to preserve an atmosphere where they will be able to continue their work free from political pressures.

Few days later, general director and editor-in-chief resigned and new acting management decided to dismiss 14 editors and journalists, accusing them of not being objective and not fulfilling role as a public service.

Over 100 journalists, editors and other employees have signed new open letter criticising the dismissals and asking the new board of directors to resign and to restore free media at RTV. With support from Independent Journalist Association of Vojvodina and Vojvodinian Civic Center, that group of journalists formed a new movement called "Support RTV". They rejected to work under pressure and organized four street protests that were supported by dozens of people. On 23 May, there was a demonstration in support of journalists.

During summer 2016, 22 employees got fired, four were transferred to Radio Novi Sad (part of RTV system) and three journalists quit. Most of the popular and quality shows have never turned back after the summer pause.

The result of dismissing the whole team of editors and anchors as well as changes in editorial contents is decline in viewership, but also increasing number of pro-government stories. For example, monitoring made by Novosadska novinarska škola shows that number of reports about government activities has been doubled (from 16 to 33%), genre diversity decreased from 49% to 30% and investigative and analytic stories, based on journalist initiative, make only 10 percent of the news program.

=== 2017 presidential election and inauguration ceremony ===
The Associated Press and Reporters Without Borders reported that Aleksandar Vučić, the candidate of the governing coalition, had ten times more airtime on national broadcasters than all other candidates combined and that mainstream media under Vučić's control have been demonizing most of the opposition presidential candidates, without giving them the opportunity to respond. Non-governmental organizations involved in election observation, CRTA and Bureau for Social Research, emphasized that the presence of Aleksandar Vučić in newspaper and the electronic media during presidential campaign was disproportionate, adding that media have lost their critical roleand that they have become a means of political propaganda.

The OSCE Report explains that general reluctance of media to report critically on or to challenge the governing authorities, significantly reduced the amount of impartial information available to voters. Furthermore, the Report states that all private national television channels displayed preferential treatment towards him in their news programs. They also mentioned that the government used public resources to support Vucic. European Commission stated in the Serbia 2018 Report that Regulatory Body for Electronic Media failed to address imbalances in media coverage of the presidential campaign.

One day before the beginning of the election silence prior to the election, seven major newspapers have covered their entire front pages with adverts for Vučić. Slaviša Lekić, president of the Independent Journalist Association of Serbia said: "With this, Aleksandar Vučić clearly demonstrated that he can control over everything in this country". He was the subject of criticism and satire for the appearance of a show on Happy TV in the last days of the campaign, with guests including his parents, in which he offered assistance in front of the camera to a man who allegedly fainted. Amnesty International and Human Rights Watch reported harassment and physical assaults on journalists during the presidential inauguration ceremony, after Vučić win election.

== Smear campaigns ==
A share of the Serbian media marked is occupied by government-aligned tabloids and TV (Informer, Kurir, e-Novine, Pink TV), which frequently engage in smear campaigns against targets, both domestically and abroad. These often also feature journalists, discrediting them as traitors, informers, thieves, and prostitutes.

The strategic use of pro-governmental media as a means of political confrontation was introduced during the Slobodan Milošević regime and especially during the period when Aleksandar Vučić was the minister of information. There are allegations that similar practice was also used by the Democratic Party-led coalition. Governments orient tabloids' editorial line through advertising grants. Their use has been made more aggressive under Serbian Progressive Party governments.

- Olja Bećković, after her dismissal from B92, was a frequent target for tabloids.
- BIRN was subject to a smear campaign after Vucic's accusations. Tabloids (Informer, e-Novine, Pink TV) went along in accusing BIRN journalists of being paid foreign agents, attempting at the prime minister's life. As a results, as declared by BIRN's director Gordana Igric, "state institutions are hesitant to give statement to BIRN". Igric herself was personally smeared by e-Novine. BIRN responded by keeping a live-blog "BIRN under fire" to analyse each incident
- Niš' Južne Vesti was also smeared by e-Novine, who personally attacked his director Blagojevic with homophobic insults, as well as BIRN's Igric and OSCE Media Freedom representative Dunja Mijatovic.
- Pro-governmental media mounted a smear campaign against the former Minister for the Economy, Saša Radulović, after he had resigned in disagreement with the government, up to painting him as violent with his own family.
- In February 2014 the leader of the New Party, Zoran Živković, publicly tore apart a copy of Kurir to express his dissatisfaction with the tabloid press ignoring the oppositions' stances. The tabloids then mounted a campaign against him, accusing him of putting pressure on the media, thus trying to gather support and hide their bullying of dissenting voices. NUNS and NUNV did not express themselves on Živković's gesture. UNS condemned Živković, thus siding with the tabloids and the government during an electoral campaign.
- In Spring 2015 Serbia's Ombudsman Saša Janković was subject to a months-long smear campaign from pro-governmental media, to diminish his authority without actually removing it, as such a move might have displeased Serbia's international supporters.
- Oliver Ivanović, Kosovo Serb opposition politician, was the target of a smear campaign led by Serb List, Serbian Progressive Party and pro-government Serbian media prior 2017 Kosovan local elections.
- Civil society organizations, in particular CSOs with a focus on human rights, are sometimes subject to vilification and smear campaigns in the media, such as Youth Initiative for Human Rights and Helsinki Committee for Human Rights in Serbia.
- Sergej Trifunović, actor and citizen activist, and his charity foundation have been target of a smear campaign and false accusations by pro-government media and members of ruling parties since 2018.
- Tamara Skrozza was the target of a smear campaign and hate messages orchestrated by Pink TV, in response to a report by the CRTA, an NGO of which Skrozza is a member, analysing TV Pink's political coverage.
- Miodrag Sovilj, an N1 reporter, has been the target of intimidation, threats and smear campaign since November 2019. After Aleksandar Vučić was hospitalized for cardiovascular problems, his associates and pro-regime media accused Sovilj of worsening the president's health by asking questions about alleged corruption by government ministers.

== Lawsuits and defamation ==
Defamation is decriminalised since 2012. Insult is still a criminal offense, but not punishable by prison - although journalists can be imprisoned if unable to pay the associated harsh fines.

- In August 2012 the President of Serbia Tomislav Nikolic officially pardoned the 69-years-old freelance journalist Laszlo Saš, who had been imprisoned for two weeks for being unable to pay a 150,000 RSD (1,200 EUR) fine for insulting a far-right Hungarian politician.

Lawsuits for defamation - keeping journalists from working and threatening them with huge amounts for compensation - are deemed a common way to push journalists to practice self-censorship, as recognised by NUNS. Statistics from 2011 show how 40% of the 242 civil defamation lawsuits against journalists and media outlets were filed by public officials, celebrities, powerful business leaders, city mayors, members of parliament, and ministers.

Fines handed down by courts to journalists upon claims of slander by politicians significantly decreased in 2014, thanks to a better understanding of the law by the courts. Yet, inconsistencies remain, as judges often ignore the norm saying that journalists cannot be punished for publishing or paraphrasing official government statements.

- The B92 broadcaster was sentenced in October 2013 (upheld in appeal in July 2014) to pay 200,000 RSD ($2,280 ) for defamation to a former assistant minister of health, who had been implicated in an article in mismanagement of public funds.

== Cyber-attacks ==
Reports have emerged of cyber-attacks against online media in Serbia in 2014. A specialised police unit for high tech crimes was established in 2006 in the General Prosecutor's Office, tasked to proceed to investigate after police referral, victims' referral, or autonomously upon media reports.

- Peščanik was subject of a cyber-attack, probably of the DDoS type, in June 2014, after having published about alleged plagiarism at Megatrend University by a minister. The Peščanik web administrator identified the attack as being launched by the Megatrend server, but the head of the police high tech crime unit dismissed the information. A second cyber-attack to Peščanik in August 2014 deleted around 35-40 online articles (later restored); Peščanik suffered 20 attacks over three days. The investigation is pending.
- Autonomija, independent news portal for Vojvodina, came under online attack in March 2014 after having run critical stories about PM Vucic. The police declared themselves unable to investigate the attack.
- Parallel to the dispute between The United Group and state-owned cable operator who dropped N1, in January 2020, the N1 web portal and mobile app was under cyber attack four times for several hours, probably of the DDoS type, and its news was not available on the application either.

== Internet censorship and surveillance ==
There are no government restrictions on access to the Internet, e-mail, or Internet chat rooms. There are isolated reports that the government monitors e-mail. Individuals and groups are able to engage in the peaceful expression of views via the Internet, including by e-mail.

The constitution prohibits arbitrary interference with privacy, family, home, or correspondence. While the law requires the Ministry of Interior to obtain a court order before monitoring potential criminal activity and police to obtain a warrant before entering property except to save persons or possessions, police occasionally fail to respect these laws. Most observers believe authorities selectively monitor communications, eavesdrop on conversations, and read mail and e-mail. Human rights leaders also believe that authorities monitor their communications.

The 2010 Law on Electronic Communications obliges telecommunications operators to retain for one year data on the source and destination of a communication; the beginning, duration, and end of a communication; the type of communication; terminal equipment identification; and the location of the customer's mobile terminal equipment. While these data can be accessed by intelligence agencies without court permission, a court order is required to access the contents of these communications. In 2013 the Constitutional Court of Serbia ruled that a court approval is necessary also for data collection.

- In early 2014 the SNS tried to stop the spread of a satirical video about Aleksandar Vučić saving a young boy from a line of cars stuck in a snowstorm near Feketić, in Vojvodina. When the attempt at censoring the video proved unsuccessful, Vučić himself endorsed it on his Facebook profile, presenting the gesture as extraordinary.
- After the May 2014 floodings, the government established a state of emergency allowing it to detain citizens for "inciting panic". Online websites that were critical of the official response to the crisis were deleted or temporarily blocked. The OSCE Media Freedom declared its concern about censorship in the case and demanded that authorities "stop interfering with the work of online media outlets". Vucic denied all claims of censorship and intimidation and called OSCE official liars, then apologized to the organization and said the government would investigate.

Since Serbian Progressive Party came to power, Serbia has seen a surge of internet trolls and pages on social networks praising the government and attacking its critics, free media and the opposition in general. That includes a handful of dedicated employees run fake accounts, but also the Facebook page associated with a Serbian franchise of the far-right Breitbart News website.

== Transparency of media ownership ==
Transparency of media ownership refers to the public availability of accurate, comprehensive and up-to-date information about media ownership structures. A legal regime guaranteeing transparency of media ownership makes possible for the public as well as for media authorities to find out who effectively owns, controls and influences the media as well as media influence on political parties or state bodies.

In Serbia media ownership is not sufficiently transparent. The lack of transparency is considered one of the main problem affecting the Serbian media system and even a characteristic of it. In 2011, the Anti-Corruption Council (ACC) indicated that the real owners of 9 of 11 commercial broadcasters were not known to the public. The report of the ACC stated that real owners were hiding with the aim of concealing specific interests which were driving forces acting behind these media outlets. The lack of media ownership transparency in Serbia is due to the collusion between the government and the regulator. Also, the legislation on media ownership transparency is controversial and incoherent as pieces of legislation were passed at different times. Furthermore, existing regulation on the identification of owners are non-existent, incomplete, non-compulsory or disregarded. As a consequence, poor and inadequate regulations enable media owners to remain hidden for a long time. Also, they do not address concerning practices, such as the one making possible the legalisation of shady capital through the media or the hiding of domestic ownership patterns through complex networks of connected foreign companies and they are not effective in preventing the infiltration of business interests in the media sector.

Existing transparency rules requires the disclosure of only minimal information. For instance, media owners are required to register only as natural and legal persons, not as individuals behind legal persons. Also, the financial flows and the source of investment are not subject to checks. The regulatory authority does not check the compliance with the rules regulating foreign organisations which operate in the media field in other countries. In 2009 an effort was pursued to regulate transparency of ownership and ownership concentration in a separate and specific law. However, the attempt failed due to the opposition by the Media Association, an association gathering the owners of print media that pressured the government to stop the adoption of the law. A new attempt to improve the regulation of ownership and market concentration in the field of media was initiated in 2011, with the drafting of the new Media Strategy. The Strategy's aims was to improve the legislation on media transparency, including by introducing the obligation to disclose information on natural and legal persons involved in the media ownership structure, on the nature and scope of their shares, the names of the ultimate owners of capital, information on their interests and shares in other media outlets and other economic enterprises, as well as on other persons having a significant degree of control or influence over a given media and data on state aid to media outlets. The new media law, the Law on Public information and Media, introduced in August 2014, regulates ownership transparency and provides that all media have to register to the Media Register, which is publicly accessible. However, according to some experts, the new law does not solve the problems connected to non-transparent ownership, including, for instance, the persisting problem that leading Serbian media outlets are hidden through a complicated networks of connected companies and individuals.

According to the Anti-Corruption Council Report on Media ownership published in 2015, out of 50 leading media outlets examined in the report, 27 have non-transparent ownership, which is often connected either to family members or offshore companies (in particular in Cyprus and the British Virgin Islands). The report identified non-transparency of media ownership among the major systemic problems that have "paralyzed the system of public information in Serbia for years". Cases of opaque ownership abounds and involves even renowned media outlets, such as the daily Politika, B92, Prva and many others. In the case of Politika, which is the oldest daily paper in the country, 50% of its share are owned by the Russian company "OOO East Media Group", the owner of which is unknown. B92 and Prva are other striking examples on opaque ownership leading to Cyprus through a series of companies operating in Greece and Bulgaria. Also, the Council found that in the period examined (2011–14) there was not any willingness of political parties to limit their influence over media ownership structures, in particular in the editorial policy, where control is exerted both formally and informally. Moreover, in examining the media register run by the Serbian Business Registers Agency (SBRA), the Council found that, due to the weaknesses of the legislative framework, the register did not represent the real state of affairs of the Serbian media landscape. The council also noted that the competent Minister, did not monitor the SBRA and the procedures for media registration. According to the report, public data made available by the Regulatory Body for Electronic Media (RBEM) and by the SBRA and contradictory and inconsistent.

The Council elaborated more than 20 recommendations for the Government of Serbia aiming at overcoming the shortcomings identified and at improving the Serbian media system. Some of the recommendations directly concerned media ownership transparency. In particular, the Council called the ministry in charge of information, in cooperation with SBRA and RBEM, to work to set up an efficient, comprehensive and transparent register of media ownership structures, together with the obligation to disclose beneficial owners based offshore. Also, the Council recommended to improve the effectiveness of the media register as well as the systems that ensure its updating and the legal oversight of registration and data entry.

== Concentration of media ownership ==
=== Legal framework ===
Limitations to the concentration of media ownership in Serbia are seth forth by the "Act on Public Information and the Media" and by the "Electronic Media Act", both adopted in 2014.

In order to protect media pluralism in the print and audiovisual sectors, the Act on Public Information and the Media prohibits merges of newspapers publishers that "exceeds 50% of the actual circulation of daily newspapers in the territory of the Republic of Serbia". For the audiovisual media sector, this threshold is set to 35% of all listener/viewer ratings.

Merges are also prohibited between publishers of newspapers with a circulation exceeding 50'000 copies a year and audiovisual media. The same act established, with Article 39, the obligation to include in the Media registry information about any natural and legal persons who directly or indirectly have more than 5% share in publishing companies.

=== Media concentration in practice ===
Widespread state ownership, which in Serbia is regarded as a legacy of the previous media system, underwent a significant decrease in the period 2003–2007. State-ownership in the media sector was meant to be completely dismissed through the privatization process concluded in 2015 but the final results of the same are considered controversial.

According to a 2014 study, the number of state-owned media at the time was publicly unknown, with estimates suggesting about 100 media, or 10% being state-owned including prominent ones such as news agency Tanjug, dailies Večernje Novosti, Politika and Dnevnik.

The Media Sustainability Index published by IREX in 2017 highlights concerns about concentration of media ownership in the country, warning that the different regulations applied to electronic and print media may constitute a significant risk-factor and stressing that both the Agency for Protection of Competition and the Regulatory Body for Electronic Media have so far failed to properly address media concentration.

In the print media sector, ownership concentration remains a major issue, particularly in the cases concerning the dailies Politika and Večernje Novosti.

According to recent analyses, the privatization process carried out in 2015 seems to have favoured an increase in concentration of media ownership. In particular, local businessman Radoica Milosavljević operating in the Serbian town of Kruševac has acquired eight media companies operating at the local level, namely Radio Television Pančevo, Radio Television Kruševac, Radio Television Kragujevac, Radio Television Caribrod, Radio Television Brus, Požega TV, Pirot TV and the Novi Kneževac Information Centre.

== See also ==
- Censorship in Serbia
- Human rights in Serbia
- Media in Serbia
- Access to public information in Serbia
- Stop bloody shirts
