= Killing of Milan Pantić =

Serbian journalist

Milan Pantić
- Born: December 18, 1954; Dragovo
- Died: June 11, 2001 (aged 46); Jagodina
- Occupation: Journalist

Milan Pantić (18 December 1954 – 11 June 2001) was a Serbian journalist who was killed by unknown people on 11 June 2001 in Jagodina.

== Biography ==
Pantić worked as a journalist for Večernje novosti, reporting particularly on crimes and trials from Jagodina. He received telephone threats for articles he had written.

== Death ==
Milan Pantić was killed on 11 June 2001 before 8.00 AM near the entrance of the building where his apartment was by unknown assailants using a blunt object. He had just been at a drugstore to buy some bread.

The South East Europe Media Organisation condemned the murder and urged Yugoslav and Serbian authorities to identify and sentence the killers.

In 2014 Stanko Kojić (who in 2013 was sentenced to 32 years for genocide in Srebrenica) was questioned over the murder.

In 2016 the case was still unresolved and the OSCE Representative on Freedom of the Media, Dunja Mijatović, urged Serbian authorities to intensify efforts to solve this and other murders of journalists.

== See also ==
- Media freedom in Serbia
- List of journalists killed in Europe
- List of unsolved murders (2000–present)
