= Petar Luković =

Serbian journalist (1951–2024)

- Петар Луковић
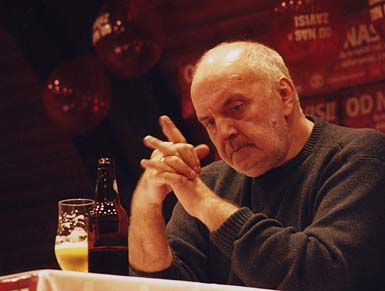
- Luković in 2006
- Born: 21 January 1951; Kraljevo, PR Serbia, FPR Yugoslavia
- Died: 12 February 2024 (aged 73); Belgrade, Serbia
- Occupation: Journalist
- Years active: 1976–2024
- Known for: Writer and editor for several publications

Petar Luković (21 January 1951 – 12 February 2024), nicknamed Pero s onog sveta (transl. Pero from the Great Beyond), was a Serbian journalist, newspaper editor and onetime rock critic. He attended the Sixth Belgrade Gymnasium, and graduated from the Faculty of Mechanical Engineering at the University of Belgrade.

== Life and career ==
Luković started his career in 1976 as a journalist for Duga magazine. As a political and rock critic, he wrote for many Yugoslav newspapers and magazines, such as Rock, Džuboks, Mladost, Polet, a Thursday supplement of Slovenian newspaper, Delo, Nedelja, Nedjeljna Dalmacija/Slobodna Dalmacija, Politika, Oslobođenje, Vjesnik, Rock 82, and others. He was the editor-in-chief of the magazine Tajne, which deals with paranormal phenomena, and the magazine Sex Club, the first pornographic magazine in Serbia. He was the editor-in-chief of the portal E-novine from its establishment until 1 March 2016, when the portal ceased to operate.

In the period from 1991 to 1996, he worked for the Belgrade weekly Vreme, where he was also deputy editor-in-chief for a time. From 1996 to 1998, he wrote for Naša Borba.

Luković wrote for Feral, satirical weekly addition of the Croatian daily from Split, Nedjeljna Dalmacija/Slobodna Dalmacija from its foundation in 1984 until his death, with a column titled "Pero sa onog sveta" (transl. Pero from the Great Beyond), which gained him a long-lasting eponymous moniker. He cooperated with the magazines Reporter from Belgrade, Dani from Sarajevo and Mladina from Ljubljana.

In the period from January 1996 until the beginning of the bombing of FR Yugoslavia in March 1999, he was the editor-in-chief of the magazine X Zabava.

After 2000, he worked for the owner of RTV Pink, Željko Mitrović.

Luković also published three books: A Better Past (1989), Ćorava Kutija (1993) and Godine Raspada — Chronicle of Serbian Decline (2000).

In 1994, he received the Dragiša Kašiković Award as one of the first three laureates, and the Staša Marinković Award of the daily newspaper Danas was received in 2001.

Petar Luković was on the electoral list of LDP, GSS, SDU, LSV for the parliamentary elections in Serbia held on 21 January 2007, but he failed to become a deputy due to the insufficient number of votes received by this coalition.

As of 2022, Luković was editor-in-chief and columnist at the online magazine XXZ Regional Portal, based in Belgrade.

Petar Luković died after a protracted illness on 12 February 2024, at the age of 73.

== See also ==
- Boris Dežulović
- Viktor Ivančić
