= Srđan Kusovac =

Serbian-Montenegrin journalist

Srđan Kusovac is a Serbian-Montenegrin journalist and state administrator in Montenegro. Since the fall of 2013, he has been the head of the Montenegrin government's Public Relations Bureau.

Prior to that, from 2009 until 2013, he was the editor-in-chef of the Montenegrin government-owned daily newspaper Pobjeda, the post to which he was named after being the media adviser to Montenegrin Prime Minister Milo Đukanović from 2008 until 2009.

== Career ==
Born in Tuzla (Bosnia and Herzegovina) and raised in Belgrade, Kusovac started getting involved with media in 1984 through Radio Beograd 202 where he worked on the staff of Index 202, the station's daily youth programme. Simultaneously, Kusovac wrote for Indexovo radio pozorište, a satirical comedy programme on Radio Beograd 202 that aired weekly. Already popular in Belgrade and the rest of Serbia, the radio programme also gained some prominence throughout SFR Yugoslavia that it soon started airing live while being performed in front of a theater audience. Some of those live airings were basis for the productions that were later performed around the country as Indexovo radio pozorište partly evolved into a theater troupe. Kusovac wrote one such show, 1986's "Znanje imanje", which aired live on radio while simultaneously being performed in Duško Radović Theater. He left Index 202 and Indexovo radio pozorište in mid 1987.

Kusovac then worked at Radio B92 until 1993. In 1993, he was a part of Radio Brod (short-lived European Union-sponsored outlet whose signal was broadcast into the former Yugoslav republics during the Yugoslav Wars), before getting hired at the United States Congress funded Radio Free Europe/Radio Liberty. At RFE/RL, Kusovac first worked as a correspondent from the Balkans before moving to the station's headquarters in Prague. Simultaneously, he contributed to various print media outlets throughout the Balkans. From July 2006 until March 2008, he maintained a blog on B92.net website.

Kusovac was employed at RFE/RL until 2007, which is when he moved his family to Montenegro. Simultaneously, in Belgrade, he was one of the founders of e-novine.com, far left wing web portal.

In July 2008, Kusovac became the media adviser to Montenegrin Prime Minister Milo Đukanović, presiding over the media fallout from the Montenegrin recognition of unilaterally declared independence of Kosovo.

In October 2009, Kusovac became the editor-in-chief of Pobjeda, a daily newspaper owned by the Montenegrin government. During his reign in 2010, the newspaper began to be published using the Latin script for the first time in its history after decades of using Cyrillic. Additionally, Kusovac got into several vicious printed exchanges with Željko Ivanović, editor-in-chief of Vijesti, rival Podgorica daily with a pro-opposition editorial policy. Kusovac left the editorial post at Pobjeda in August 2013. The manner in which he left the paper aroused controversy in Montenegro. Vijesti published the news of Kusovac's departure from Pobjeda in early August 2013, however Kusovac angrily denied it, saying he is only going on vacation while vowing to "throw the Vijesti people in jail just like I promised". However, despite Kusovac's denials, his departure from Pobjeda was officially confirmed in late September 2013.

At the same time, Kusovac got announced as the new head of the Montenegrin government's Public Relations Bureau.

Two journalists from the independent weekly magazine Monitor, Milka Tadic Mijovic and Milena Perovic, sued Kusovac for damaging their "reputation and honour" in a series of articles that were published in Pobjeda between September 2011 and April 2012. The case was settled in 2019 when Kusovac was required to pay the two journalists 5,000 euros each.
