= National Library of Kosovo =

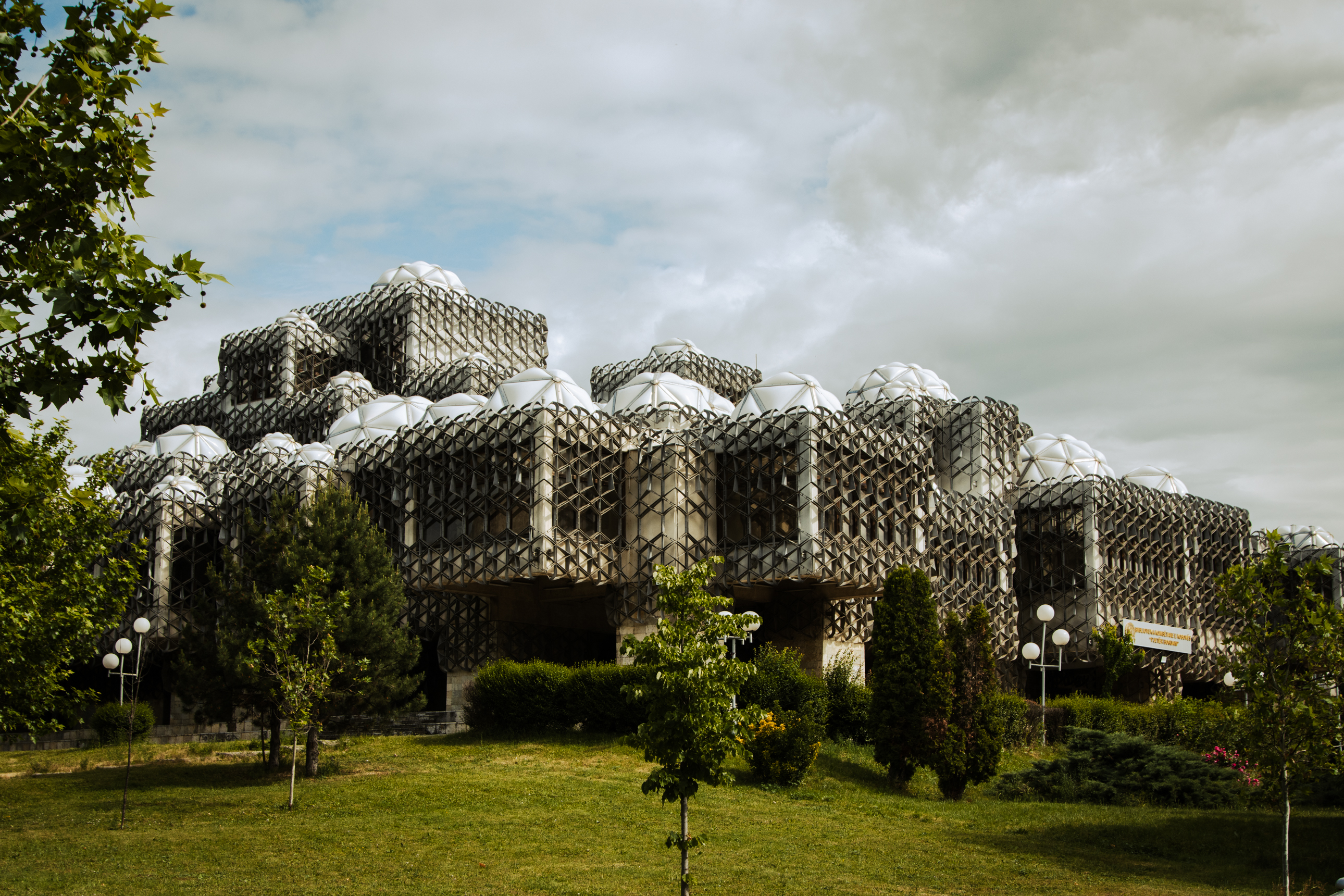
- 42°39′26″N 21°9′44″E
- Location: Pristina, Kosovo
- Established: 1944; 82 years ago
- Architect: Andrija Mutnjaković
- Reference to legal mandate: The Government Approval Document for The National Library of Kosovo

Collection
- Items collected: books, journals, newspapers, magazines, manuscripts, maps, pictures and digital resources
- Size: 1,890,194

Access and use
- Circulation: 5,000

Other information
- Director: Dr. Blerina Rogova Gaxha
- Website: bkk-pjeterbogdani.rks-gov.net/en/

Cultural Heritage under Permanent Protection
- Official name: Bibloteka Kombëtare e Kosovës "Pjeter Bogdani"
- Type: Architectural Heritage: Monument/Ensemble
- Reference no.: 3639

The National Library of Kosovo (Albanian: Biblioteka Kombëtare e Kosovës; Serbian: Народна библиотека Косова, romanized: Narodna biblioteka Kosova) is the highest library institution in Kosovo established by the Assembly and is located in Pristina.

The mission of the library is to collect, preserve, promote and make accessible the documentary and intellectual heritage of Kosovo. It holds exhibitions and holds an archive of national newspapers. The library also provides a number of other services. It is known for its unique history, and the style of the building designed by the Croatian architect Andrija Mutnjaković, followed by controversies about the outside appearance of it. It was ranked in the top ten ugliest buildings in the world by VirtualTourist.

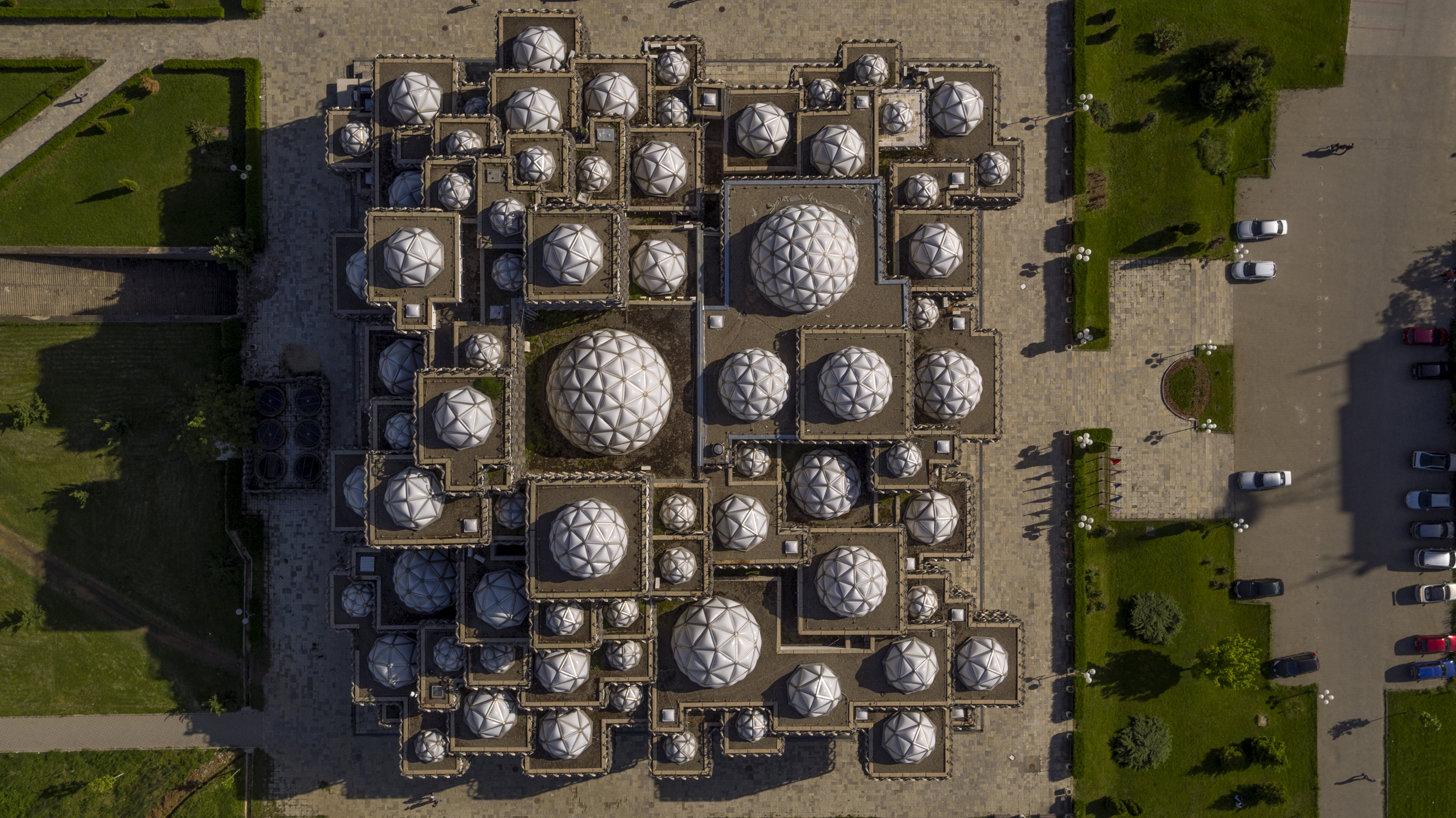
Bird's-eye-view of the building

== History ==
=== Founding ===
The history of libraries in Kosovo dates back to the 14th and 15th centuries. Collections of the Christian and Muslim religious communities there are considered as the oldest archives libraries in Kosovo.

Kosovo's institutional library was officially founded in December 1944 in the city of Prizren.

In 1982 the library was moved to the current building which was built in Pristina, the current capital of Kosovo.

Over the years the National Library's name has changed depending on the political position of Kosovo.

Years	Name
1944–1952	Regional Library of Autonomous Province of Kosovo
1956–1961	The Library Center of the Autonomous Province of Kosova and Metohija
1961–1970	The National Provincial Library
1970–1990	The National and University Library of Kosovo
1990–1999	The National and University Library of Kosovo and Metohija
1999–2014	The National and University Library of Kosovo (Note: "Ivo Andrić National and University Library" in Serbian)
2014–current	The National Library of Kosovo

Note that the former official names of the National Library of Kosovo are originally in Albanian and can be found in the library's journal Bibloletra

=== 1989–1999 ===
In 1989, the status of Kosovo as an autonomous region of Serbia was revoked, tens of thousands of Kosovo Albanians working in the public sector lost their jobs, and Albanian students could not attend university courses in Albanian language anymore. For public and private libraries in Kosovo, the 1998-1999 period was a time when many library collections were burned and destroyed.

The library was subsequently used to house a large number of refugees from Bosnia-Herzegovina and Croatia who had fled their countries due to the Yugoslav Wars. After NATO's occupation of Kosovo in June 1999, it was revealed that the Yugoslav Army had used the library as a command-and-control centre. The materials inside had been stolen, reading room furniture smashed, and the card catalogue had been dumped in the basement. The library workers were kept out for a week while Kosovo Force (KFOR) peacekeeping troops checked the building for any hidden explosives.

According to national and international organizations, about 100,000 Albanian-language books have been sent to the paper mill in Lipjan for pulping. Among those books were collections of national heritage, which explained the nation's origins and history.

=== Reorganization ===
After the war in Kosovo there was a great will and desire to reconstruct the library buildings and re-establish library services at all levels. This was done with the assistance of a special group of experts from UNESCO, the Council of Europe (CoE) and the International Federation of Library Associations and Institutions (IFLA).

This special group of experts created different training programs like: Legislation and Administration, Mobile Library, Reconstruction, Book and Reading, Information Technology Professional Training and Development, Cultural Heritage, Children and Youth, Open Access Programme, Initiative Support, Twinning. During the years of reorganization the National Library of Kosovo has been aided by many institutions such as the US Embassy, OSCE, Zentralbibliothek Zürich, German Artist Initiatives, Raiffeisen Bank International.

== Architecture ==
=== Building ===
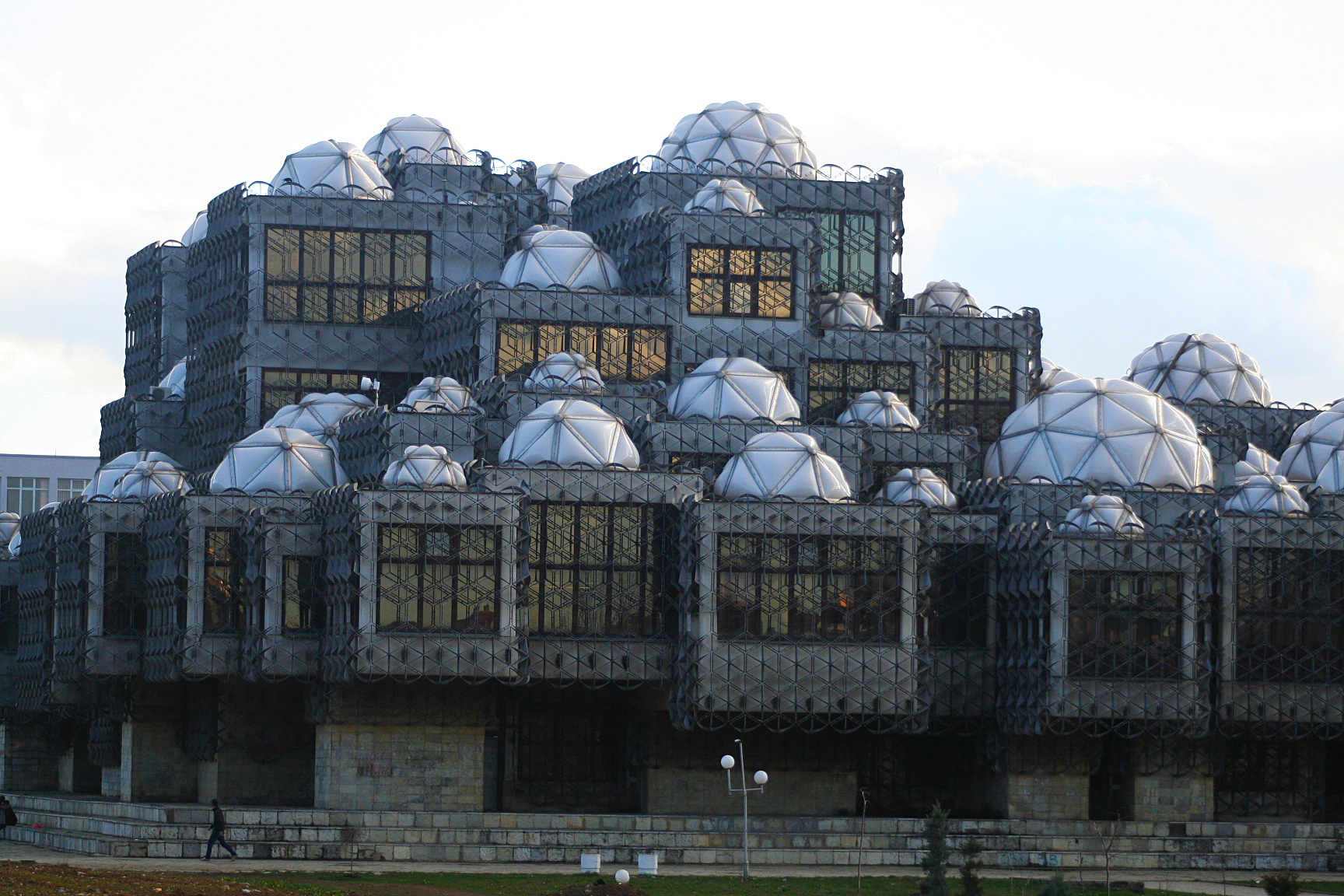
Another outside look of the Library focusing on the domes.

The most significant part of the current library is its building. There are contradictory opinions about its style, which have resulted in different versions regarding the building. The current building of the National Library of Kosovo was inaugurated on 25 November 1982. It was designed by the Croatian architect Andrija Mutnjaković. Its space consists of 16,500 square meters. It is made with zenith windows, with a total 99 domes of different sizes and is entirely covered in a metal fishing net, which have their own particular architectural symbolism.

It houses two reading rooms with 300 and 100 seats respectively, a reading room for periodicals, rooms for special collections, cataloguing and research, a 150-seat amphitheatre and a 75-seat meeting hall. It has the capacity to accommodate about two million volumes. The materials are located on two levels below ground and are closed to the public.

The lobby of the library is used for various cultural events. The floor of the hall is a unique work of diverse mosaic marble stone. The largest dome of the library is the main ornament of the hall's high ceiling, thus providing ample natural lighting.

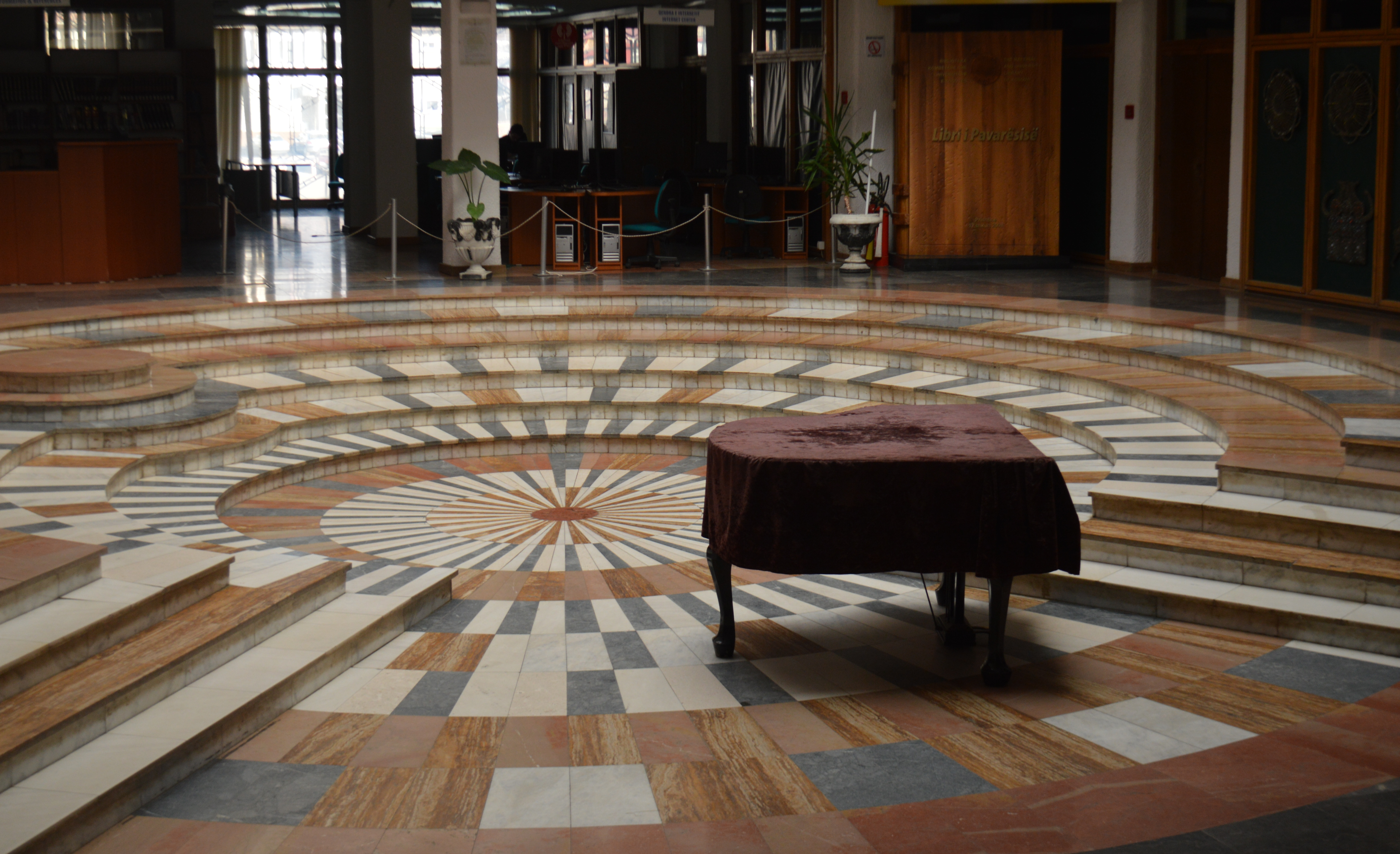
The main hall with the marble floor.

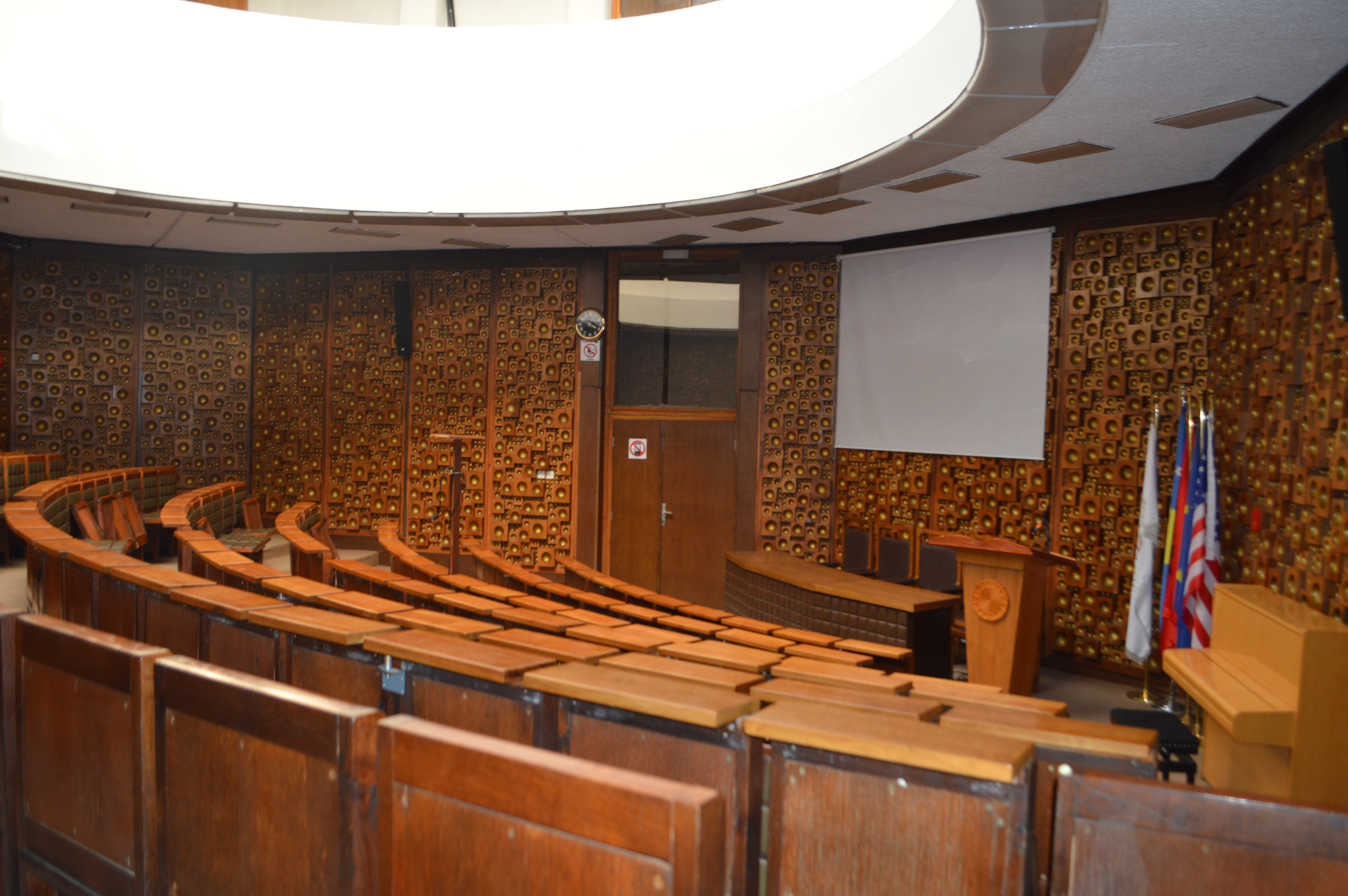
One of the amphitheatres inside the Library.

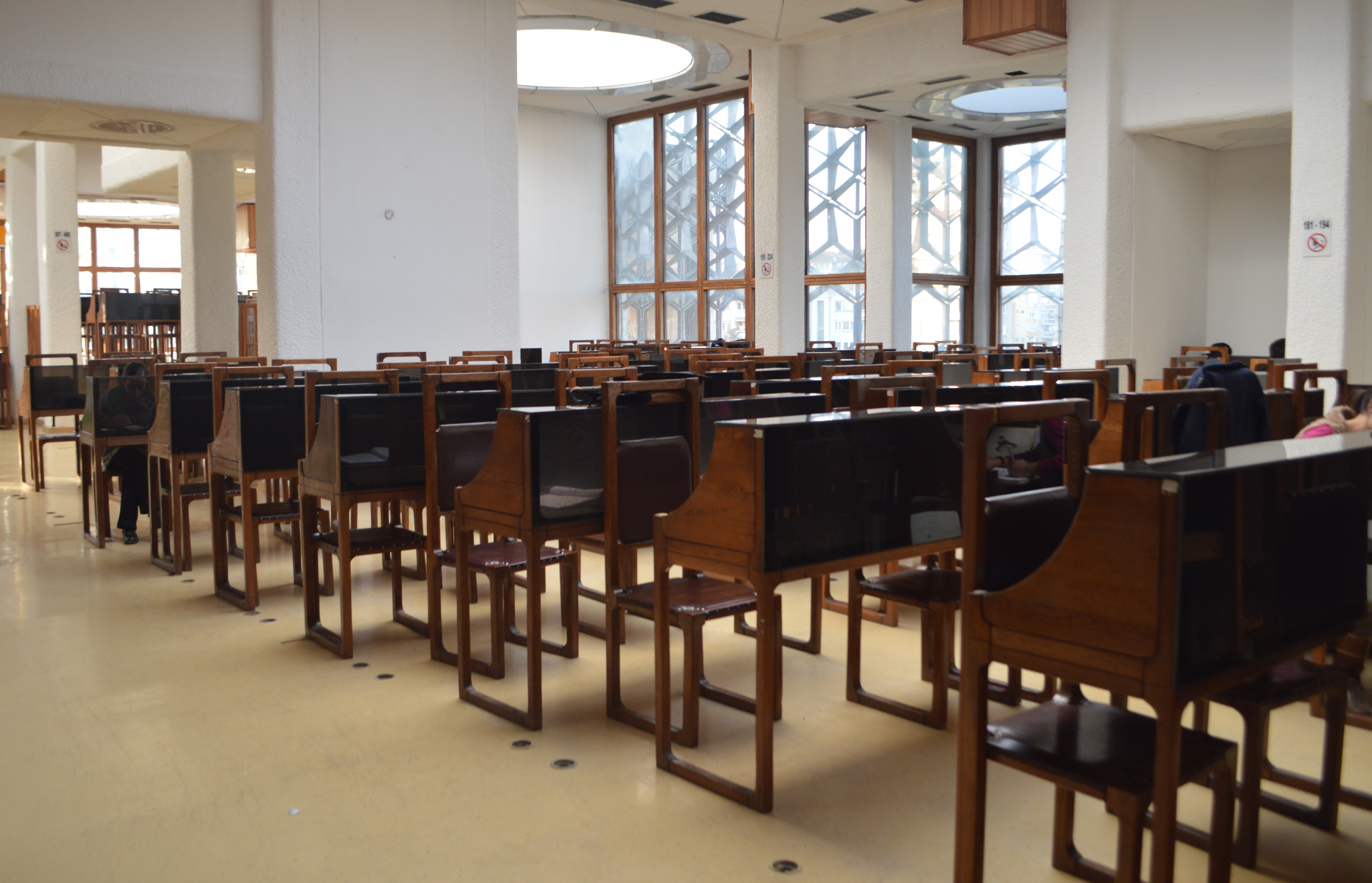
One of the reading rooms inside the Library.

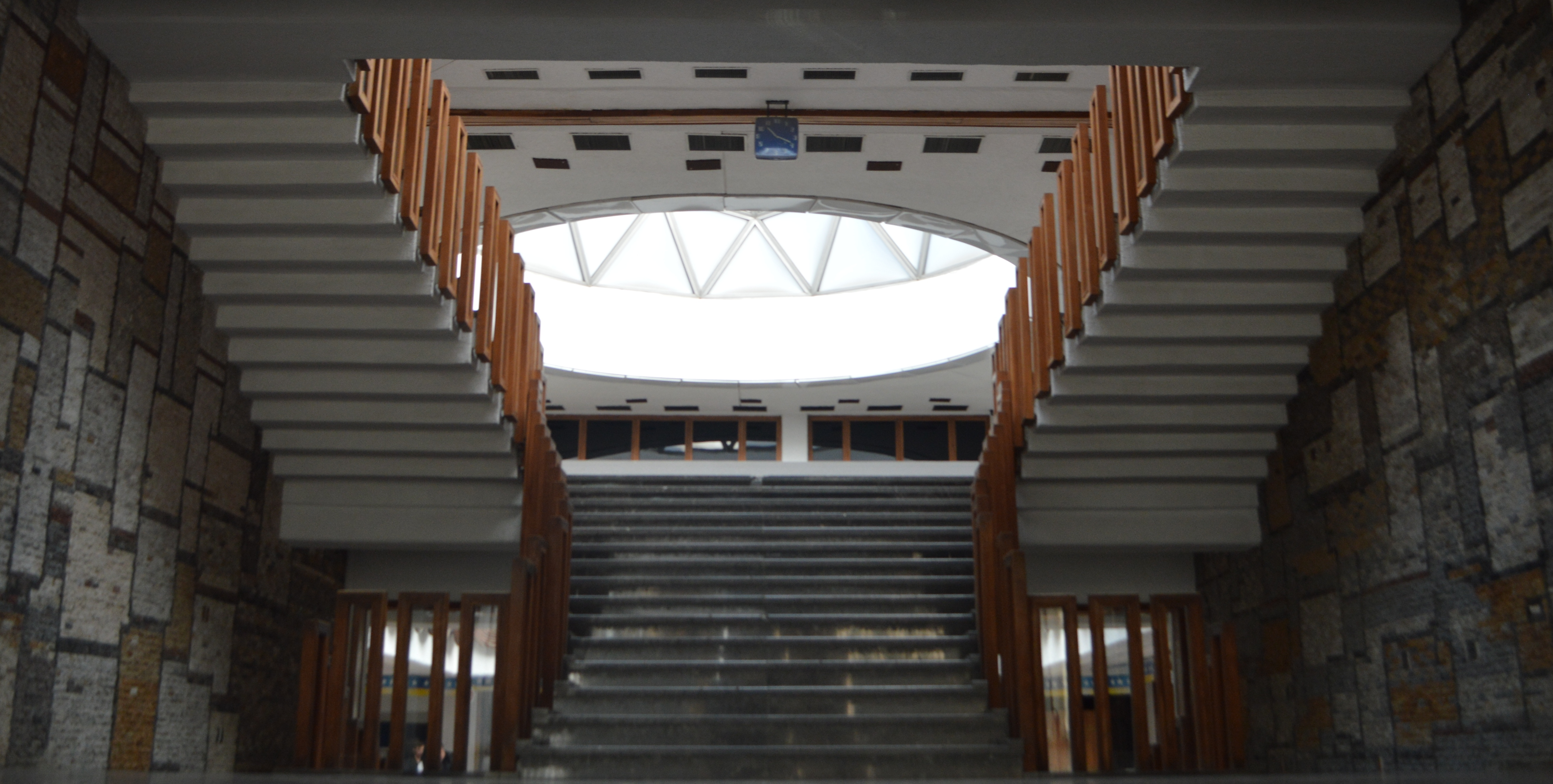
The view to the third floor.

=== Style and controversy ===
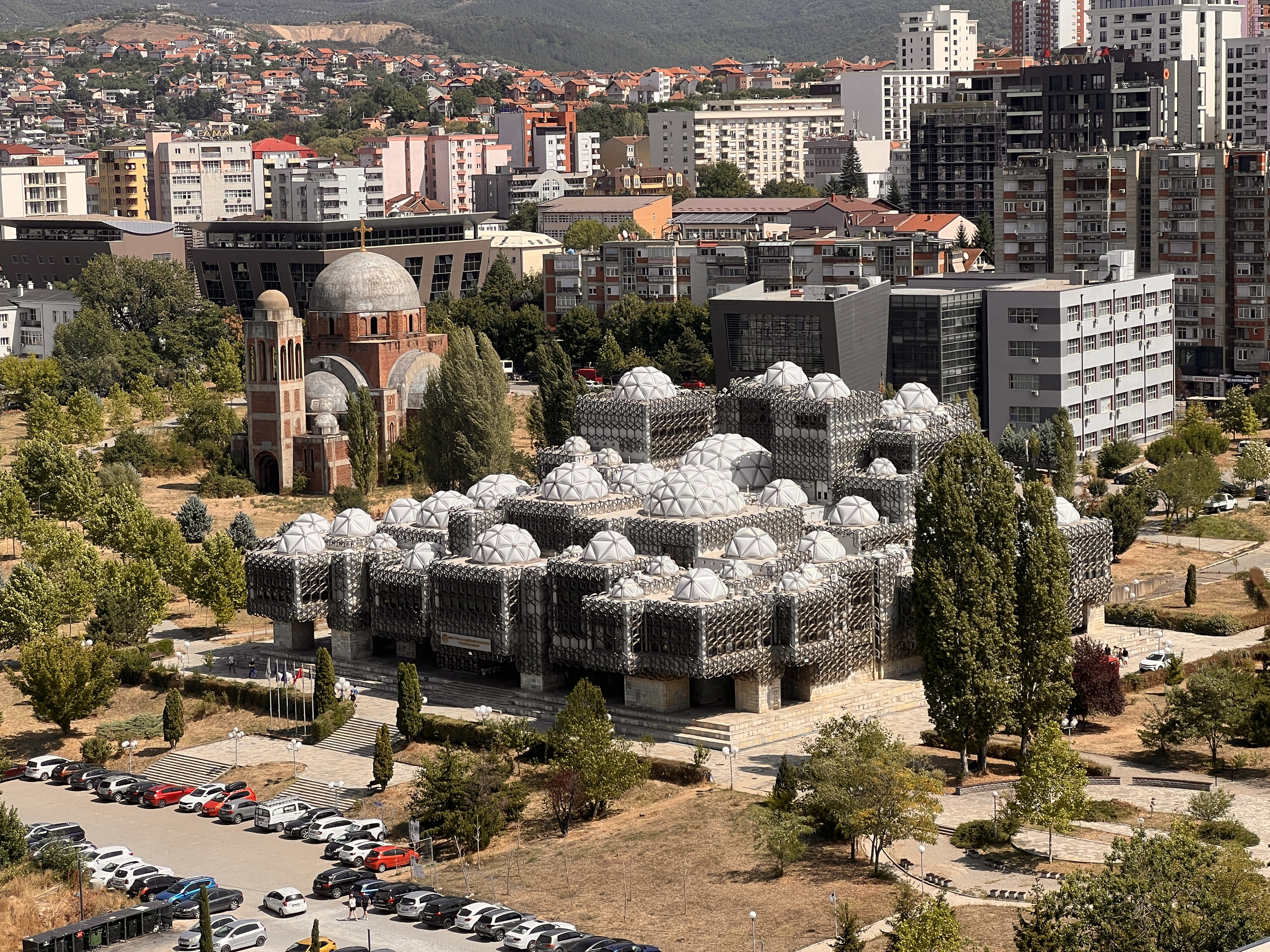
View of the National Library of Kosovo and the unfinished Christ the Saviour Cathedral in summer 2025. View from one of the towers of Mother Teresa Cathedral.

According to the architect of the National Library of Kosovo the building is meant to represent a style blending Byzantine and Islamic architectural forms. In other sources there are statements from the actual architect that “this project which is linked to the tradition of pre-Romanesque architecture of the Balkans, was being considered among other project for the Sarajevo National Library building”.

By others this building is seen as a reaction to the impersonality of International Style and an attempt to combine modern means with regional traditions and rural architecture, but also as a Modern-Metabolist style.

Despite the official statements of the architect about the style of the National Library of Kosovo there are many other controversies when it comes to the appearance of the building and its meaning. One of the most famous versions is the one that connects the domes of the building with the national Albanian hat “plisi”. This was the reason why Serbian politicians reacted very strongly about the appearance of the building.

Another version is that this project was meant to reconcile the relations between Serbians and Albanians. Its domes are a combination of existing hamams in Prizren and Patriarchate of Peć.

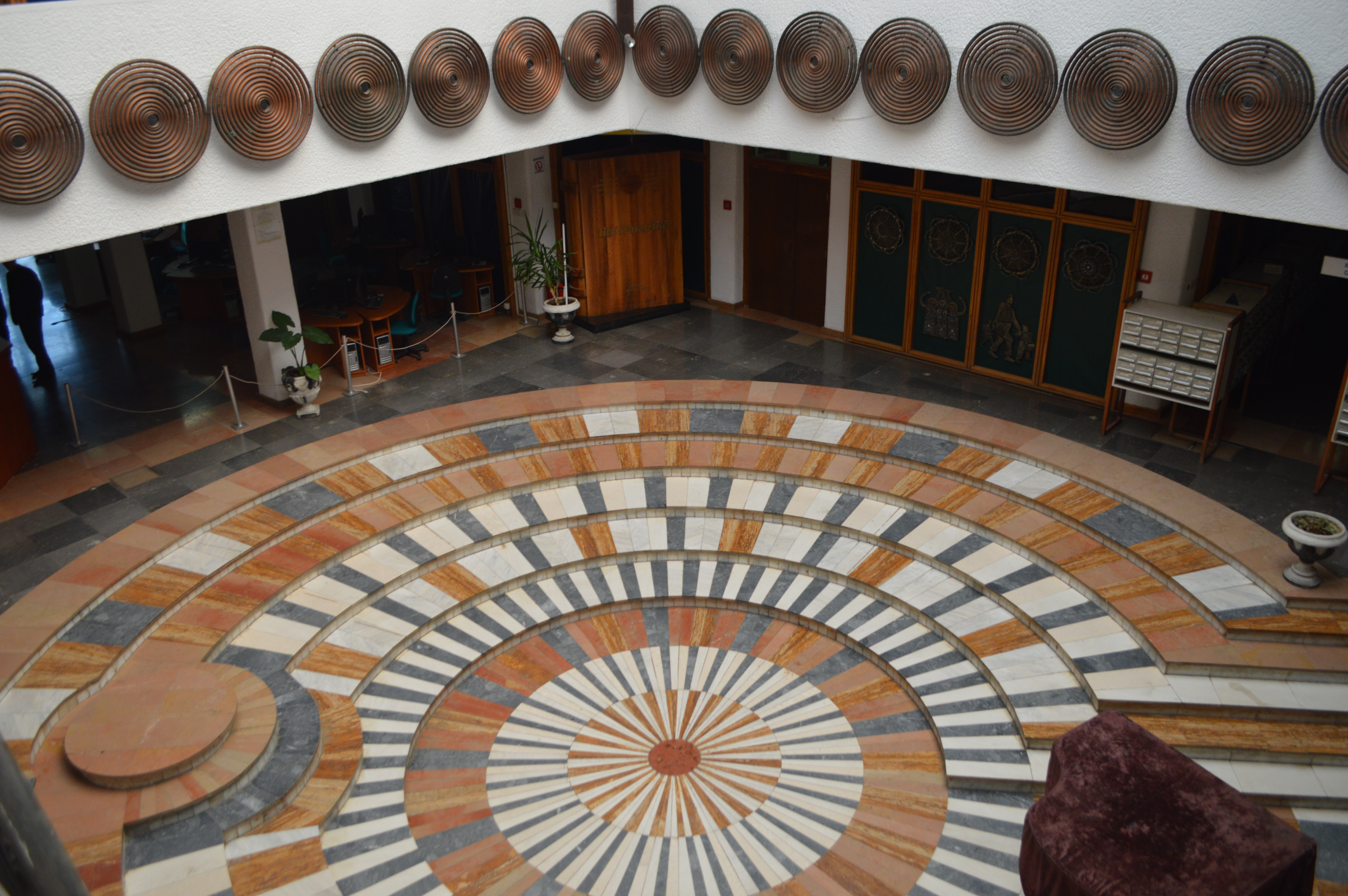
Circular rosettes by Simon Shiroka.

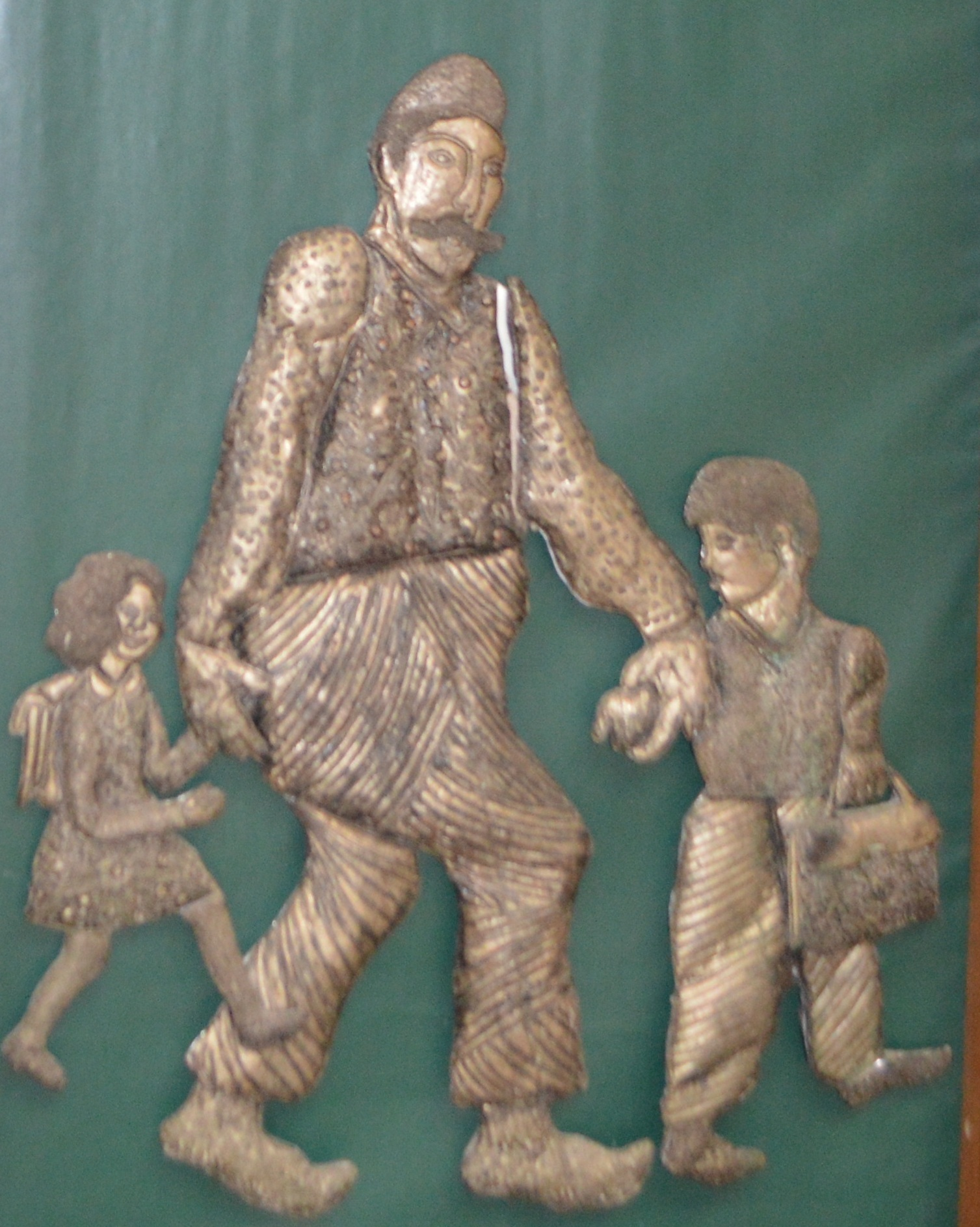
A rosette by Simon Shiroka of an old man wearing the Albanian hat “Plisi”.

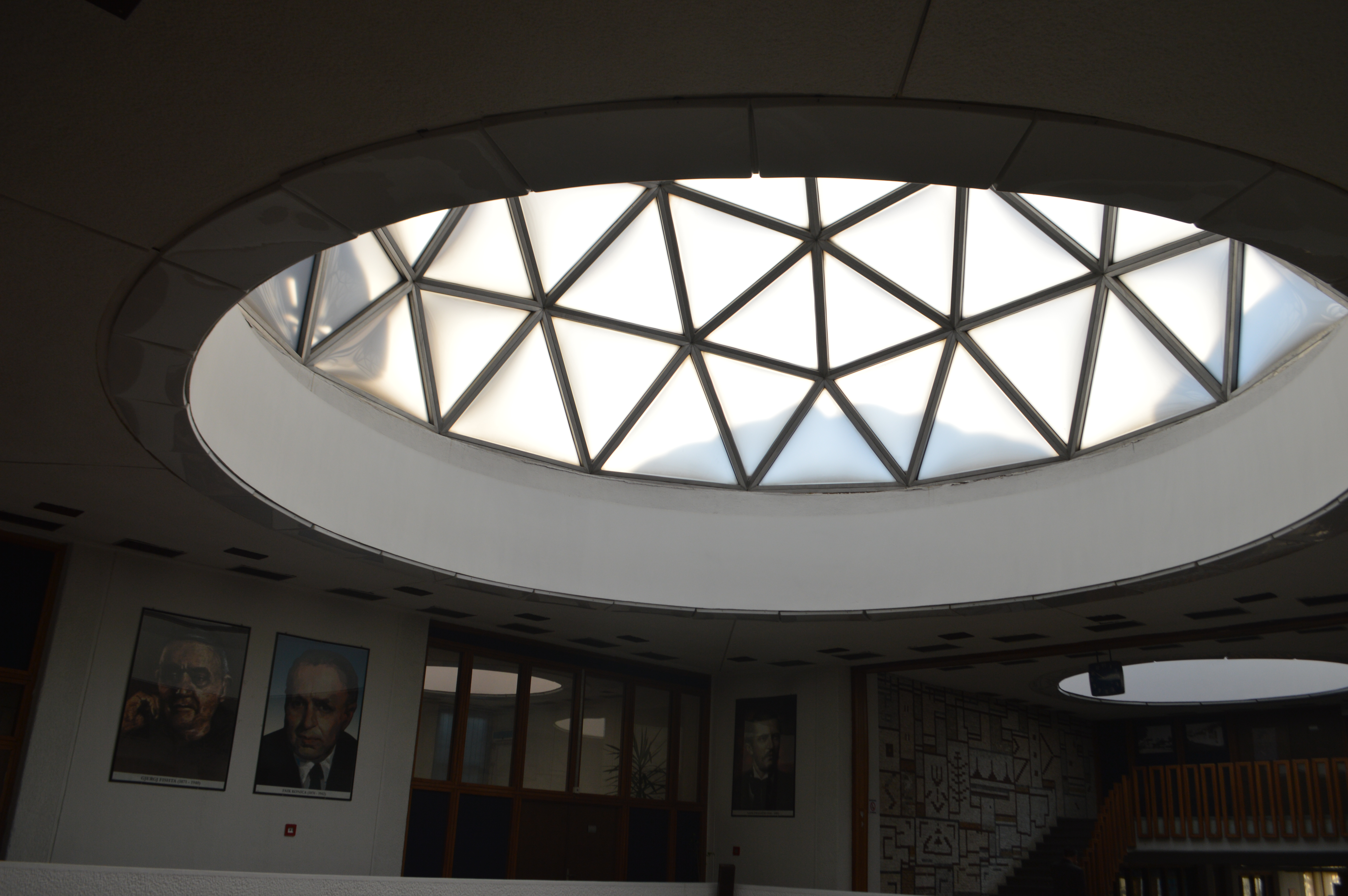
One of the domes inside the Library.

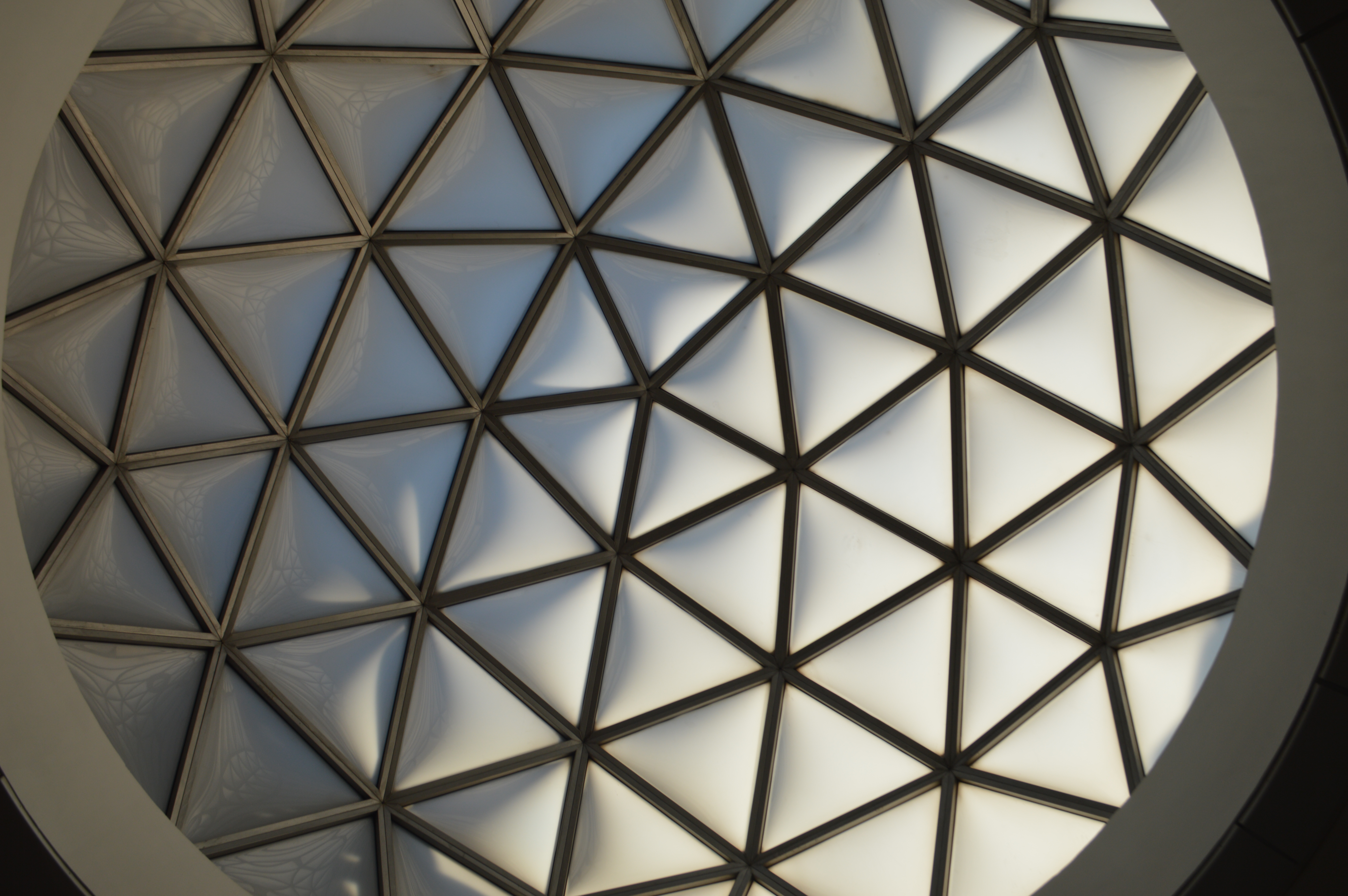
Another inside view of one of the domes.

== Library cooperation ==
The National Library of Kosovo is responsible for coordinating all Kosovo libraries within the country. Also, it is responsible for supplying information for higher education and research, and access to various databases.

=== Collections ===
The National Library of Kosovo has 1,890,194 library units, with 475,324 titles, 382,806 of which are books, 281,591 are magazines, 984,022 newspapers and 241,775 other units. Between 2004 and 2009 the library was enriched with 30,000 new titles.

In 2013 the number of the library's collections reached 2 million units.

This library houses collections of old books, old newspapers, magazines, Albanian manuscripts written in Latin, Greek, and Arabic scripts, and graphics. It also holds maps, photographic documents, and other materials.

The oldest book found in the National Library is Historia de vita et gestis Scanderbegi Epirotarum principis by Marin Barleti, written in Latin.

=== Cataloging and classification ===
National Library of Kosovo uses three international cataloging standards. AACR2 which is ISNC standard, ISBD which is IFLA standard and MARC 21 standard. The National Library of Kosovo uses two standard classification of materials, Universal Decimal Classification and Subject Classification.

== Visits ==
Anyone may use National Library services, but people must be at least 18 years old to request and order materials from the collections. Items of the Library cannot be borrowed for home use and must be read in one of the reading rooms. About 5,000 users are registered every year, making it the most frequented library in Kosovo. It is one of the most visited attractions in Kosovo.

== Organization ==
The National Library is a state institution which reports to the Ministry of Culture and it is regulated by law. There are several mini libraries inside the National Library like the American Corner, Library of Contemporary Art, NATO Library, Music Library, Library for the Blind, Fehmi Agani Library, Library of Krist Maloki, Authors Archive Library, etc.

== Digital library ==
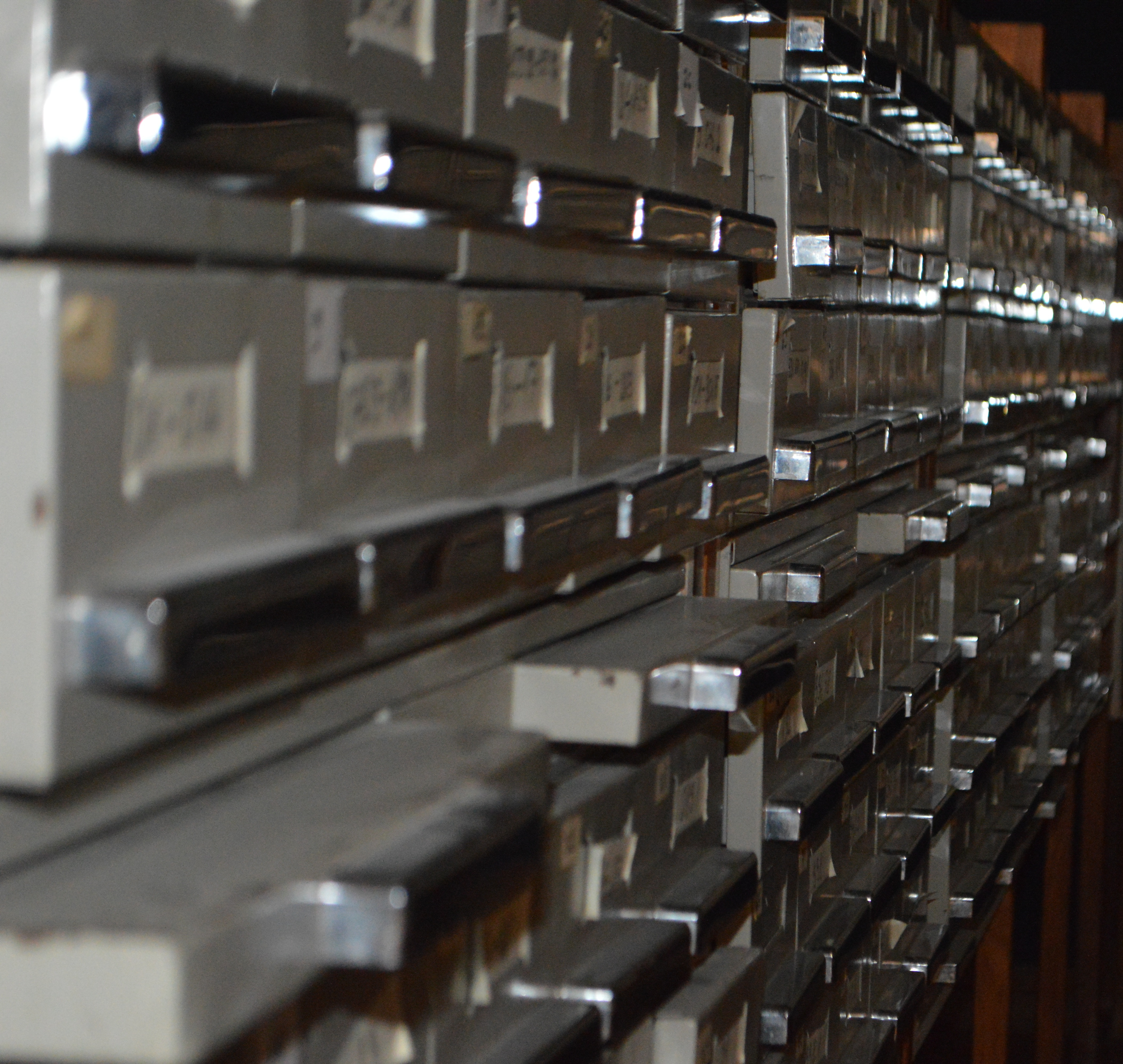
An analog catalog found in the National Library of Kosovo

Digitization for the National Library of Kosovo is a project of great importance. During this process, the National Library of Kosovo aims to put online the national heritage and other materials dealing with Kosovo to promote them and to make it easier for natives and individuals from other countries to have access to it. In 2008, with a view to developing a portal resembling the American Memory, Memory (Albanian: Kujtesa), the Documentary Centre of Kosovo was established.

Due to the very large number of documents that must digitized, a process that takes a lot of time, the Library has established a sequence of criteria for documents that must be digitized before others and one of the basic criteria is the cultural and historical value of that material. Based on those criteria, these are the documents that have priority in digitization : most requested material which is in poor physical condition, historical books and manuscripts, microfilms and other very required materials.

In general, materials that are most commonly digitized are rare books (49%), photographs (44%), manuscripts (39%), monographs (35%), music (30%), newspapers (9%), maps (1%).

Besides digitizing its own material the National Library of Kosovo provides access to some of the most popular electronic resources in the world and that made possible through the Electronic Library Consortium of Kosovo. For services for electronic resources in different libraries of the world the National Library of Kosovo was supported by Kosovo Foundation for Open Society, and by companies like EBSCO and GALE with financial support from the U.S. Embassy in Pristina. While Raiffeisen Bank Kosovo supported the Oxford Music Online and the OSCE Mission in Kosovo supported OXFORD Scholarship Online and Oxford Journal.

== Other libraries in Pristina ==
There are many other libraries in Kosovo, such as the Library of the Academy of Sciences and Arts of Kosovo, Albanology Institute Library Pristina, Hivzi Sulejmani Public Library, and other school and faculty libraries, which are developed in scientific and educational institutions.

One of the main goals of the National Library of Kosovo is the establishment and reactivation of many new libraries in order to develop the librarianship of Kosovo.

== Gallery ==
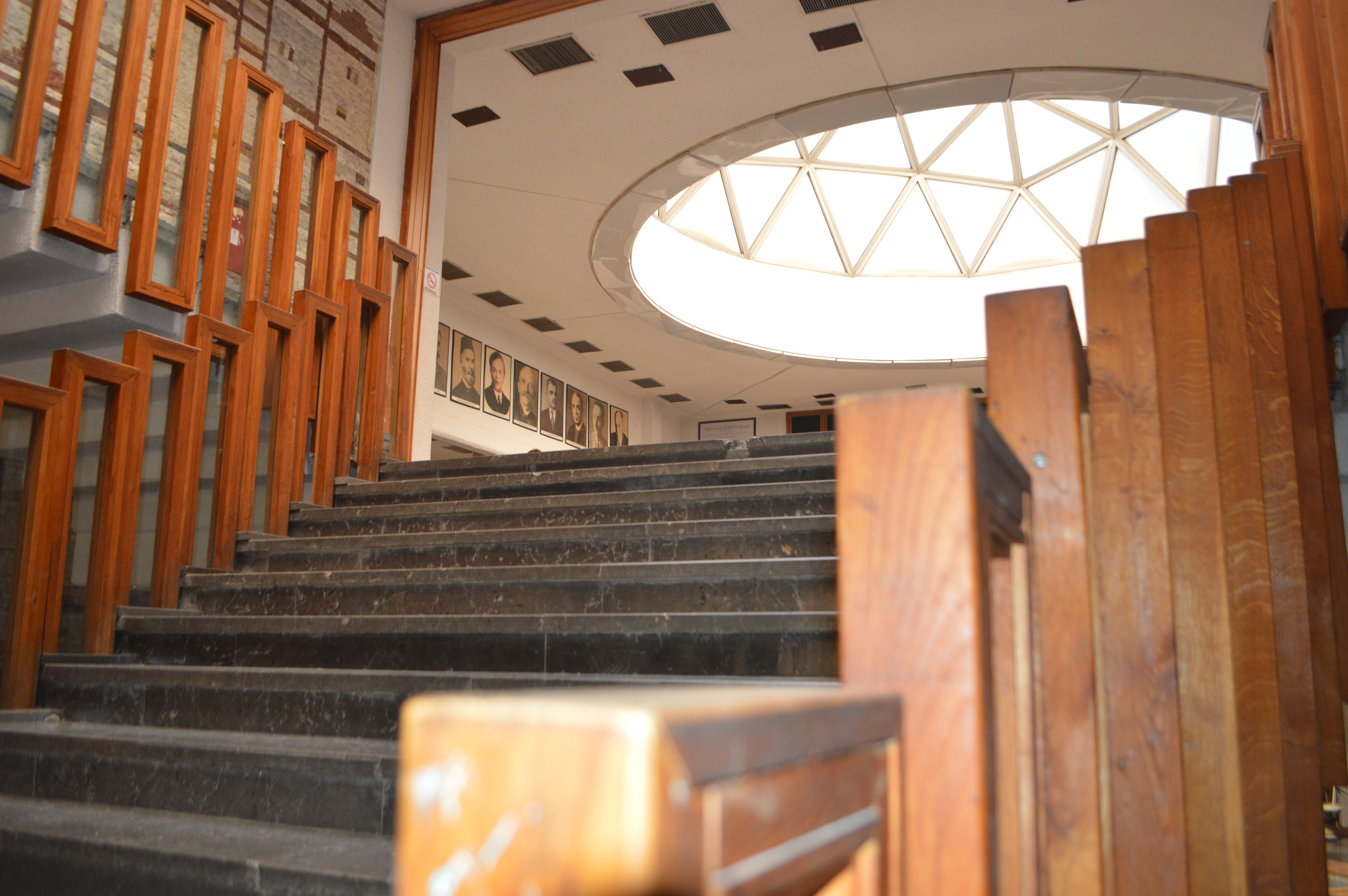

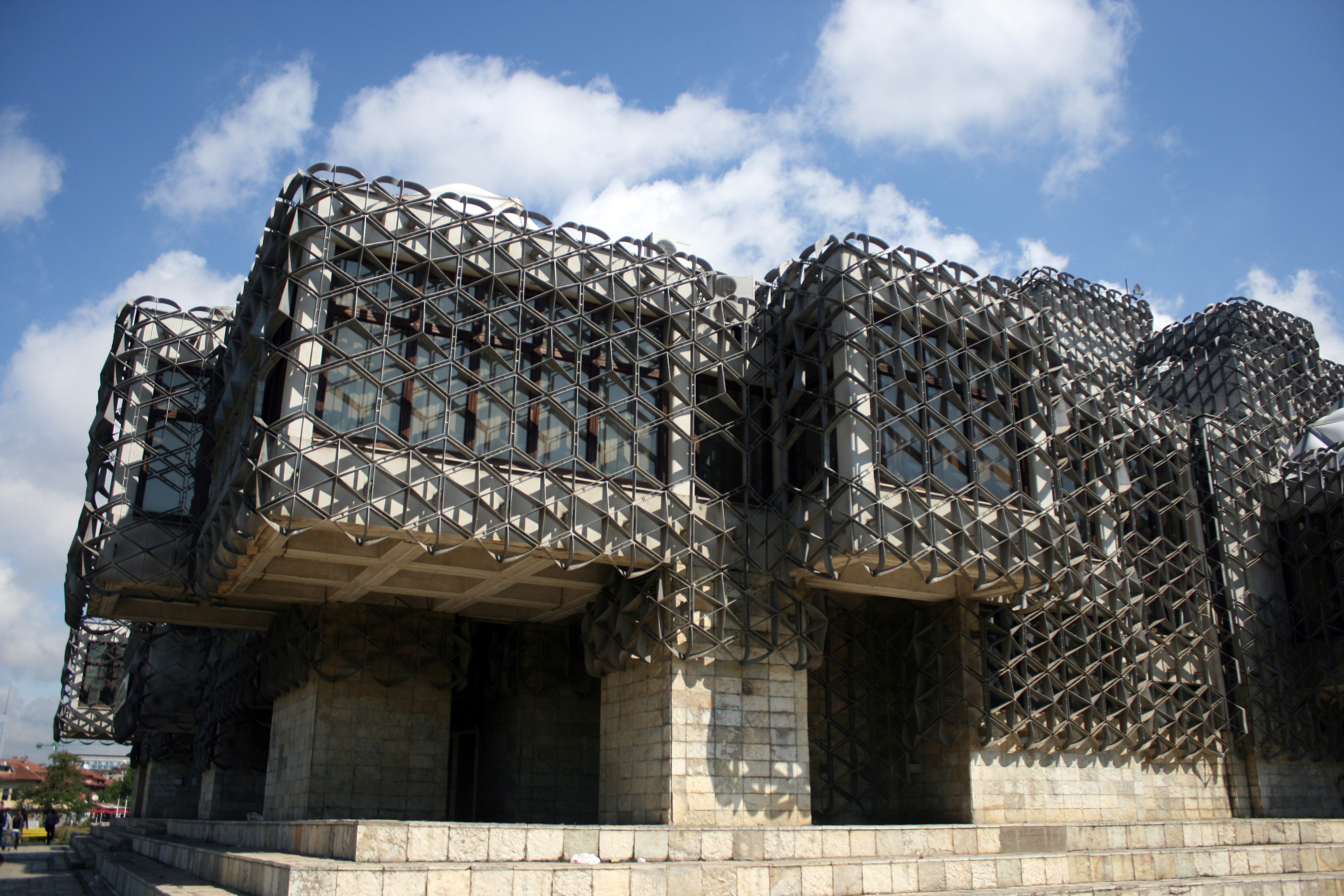

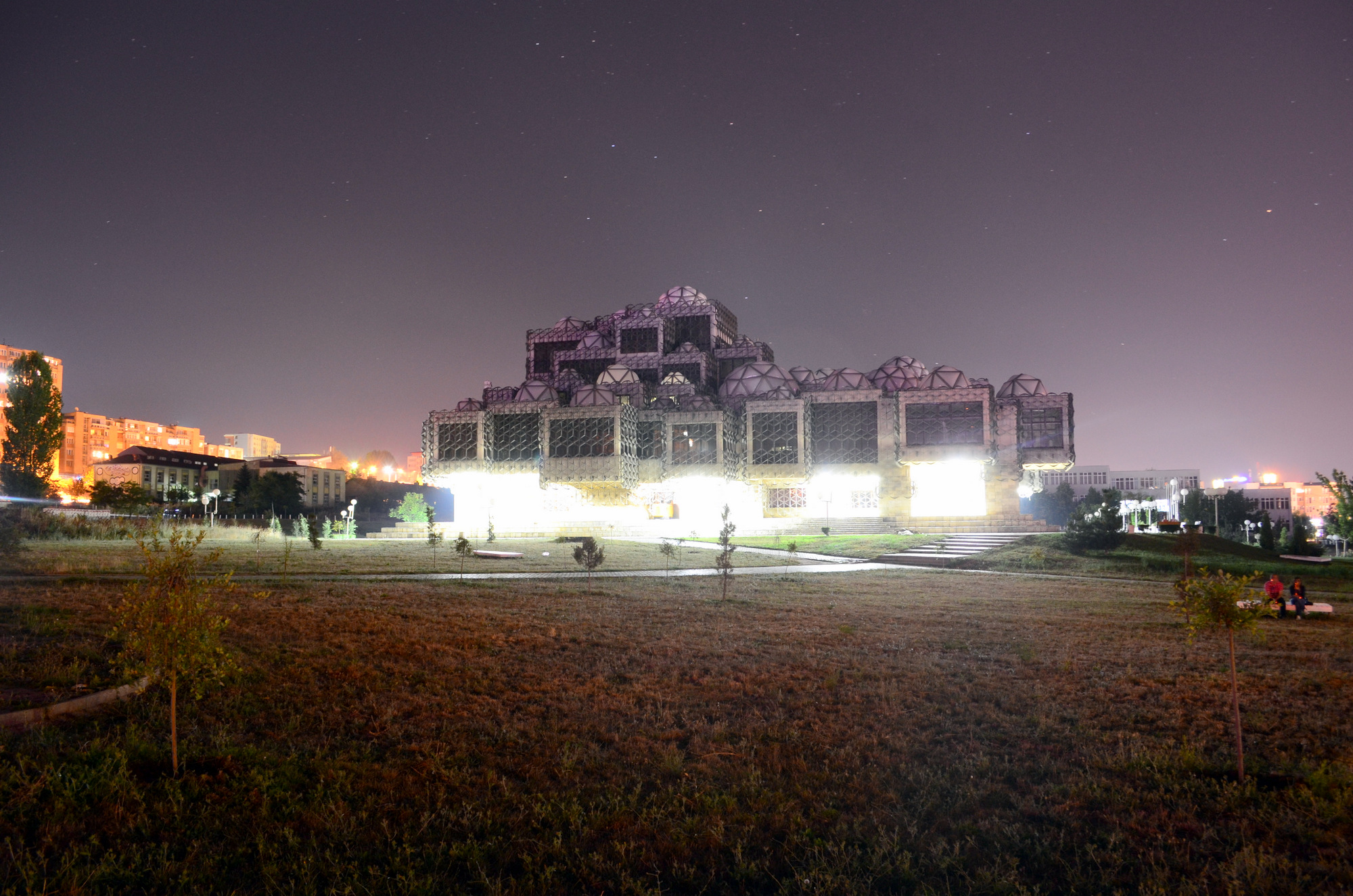

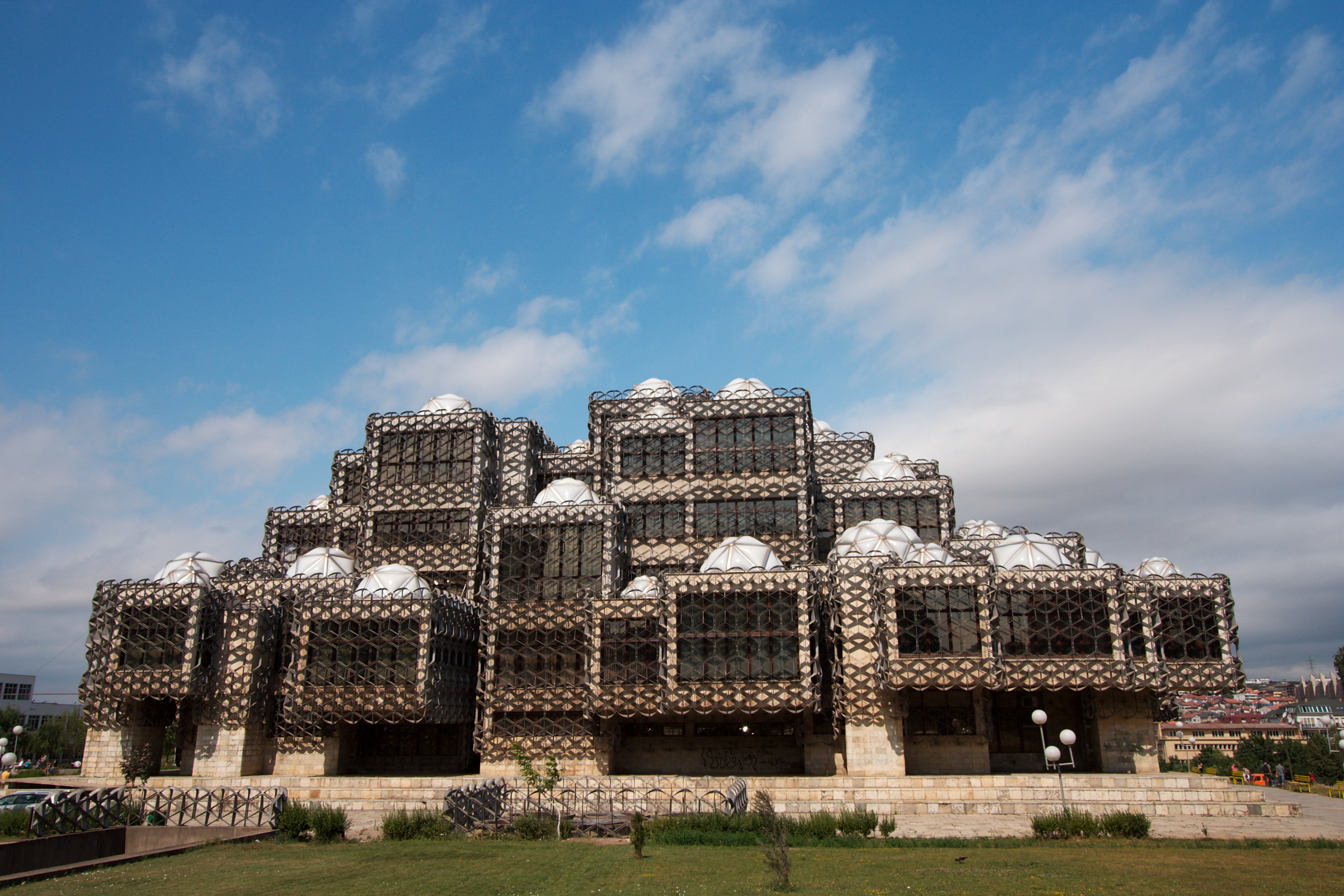

== See also ==
- List of libraries in Kosovo
