= Censorship in Serbia =

Censorship in Serbia is prohibited by the Serbian constitution. Freedom of expression and of information are protected by international and national law, even if the guarantees enshrined in the laws are not coherently implemented. However, instances of censorship and self-censorship have been reported; as of 2015 Serbia was deemed "partly free" as judged by Freedom House and ranked 59th out of 180 countries in the 2016 Press Freedom Index report compiled by Reporters Without Borders. According to the 2015 Freedom House report, media outlets and journalists in Serbia have been subject to pressure from politicians and owners over editorial contents. Also, Serbian media have been heavily dependent on advertising contracts and government subsidies which make journalists and media outlets exposed to economic pressures, such as payment defaults, termination of contracts and the like.

== Background ==
In Serbia the transition to democracy took place a decade later than in other Socialist countries. This delay is reflected in the media system whose modernization has been slow and contradictory. The mechanisms of political influence are therefore in place also in the post-Milošević even if they are of a different type if compared with the Socialist past and more sophisticated. At the South-East Europe's first international conference on media freedom, organized in 2011 by the European Commission, journalist Gordana Igrić, founder of the Balkan Investigative Reporting Network (BIRN) explained how political influence over the media and censorship has changed its nature as, if in the past for politicians was enough to pick up the phone, today media outlets are influenced by a pervasive ideological conditioning.

As of 2015 Serbia was deemed "partly free" as judged by Freedom House and ranked 59th out of 180 countries in the 2016 Press Freedom Index report compiled by Reporters Without Borders. According to the 2015 Freedom House report, media outlets and journalists in Serbia have been subject to pressure from politicians and owners over editorial contents. Also, Serbian media have been heavily dependent on advertising contracts and government subsidies which make journalists and media outlets exposed to economic pressures, such as payment defaults, termination of contracts and the like.

In 2020, Serbia ranked 93rd out of 180 countries on the Reporters Without Borders (RSF) media freedom ranking list. According to Aleksandar Vučić the lower ranking was "due to one case", alleging to journalist Milan Jovanović, whose house was burned down in 2018, "a case which has not been solved yet".

In 2021, the Bureau for Social Investigation (BIRODI) reported that Serbian media had become "an industry of populism, promotional, propaganda and revenge tool for personal power", based on nine-years of research.

== Censorship and soft-censorship ==
In 2015, EU commissioner Johannes Hahn was questioned about a Reporters Without Borders report on censorship in Serbia. He questioned its validity, responding "that is no proof. I need to see based on what criteria they produce these assessments." According to Christian Mihr in 2015, executive director of Reporters Without Borders, "censorship in Serbia is neither direct nor transparent, but is easy to prove" with numerous examples of censorship and self-censorship in Serbia with cases of articles critical of the government which were deleted from the Internet, while independent journalists are either threatened or pressured. Mihr also recalled how during the May 2014 floods some articles were taken off websites, while the government "attacked several critical reports" of the official response to the natural events. According to Mihr, Serbian prime minister Aleksandar Vučić has proved "very sensitive to criticism, even on critical questions," as was the case with Natalija Miletic, correspondent for Deutsche Welle Radio, who asked him in Berlin about the media situation in Serbia and about allegations that some ministers in the Serbian government had plagiarized their diplomas, and who later received threats and offensive articles on the Serbian press. Serbia's Independent Association of Journalists (NUNS) endorsed RWB's 2015 report. According to a survey by NUNS in December 2014, 40% of 585 Serbian journalists reported being occasionally subjected to censorship, while 48% believed their colleagues occasionally self-censor their work. Another survey, by Germany's Konrad Adenauer Stiftung, from September 2014, remarked that more than 90% of journalists polled said both censorship and self-censorship are present in the Serbian media; 73% agreed that Serbian media lack objectivity, and 95% that reporting is rarely critical.

A 2015 report by the World Association of Newspapers and News Publishers (WAN-IFRA) and the Center for International Media Assistance (CIMA) defined and described the emergence of a new form of censorship, namely the practice of soft censorship. This expression, used for the first time in 2005 in a report by the Open Society Justice Initiative, refers to an array of practices and schemes aiming at influencing the media without resorting to legal interdiction, direct censorship and direct economic threat. Pressure might include the discriminatory and selective allocation of public funds, the abuse of regulatory powers and opaque and discretionary inspections.

Serbia has been in the vanguard of a "global wave of autocratization".

== See also ==
- Media of Serbia
- Media freedom in Serbia
- Stop bloody shirts
