= Access to public information in Serbia =

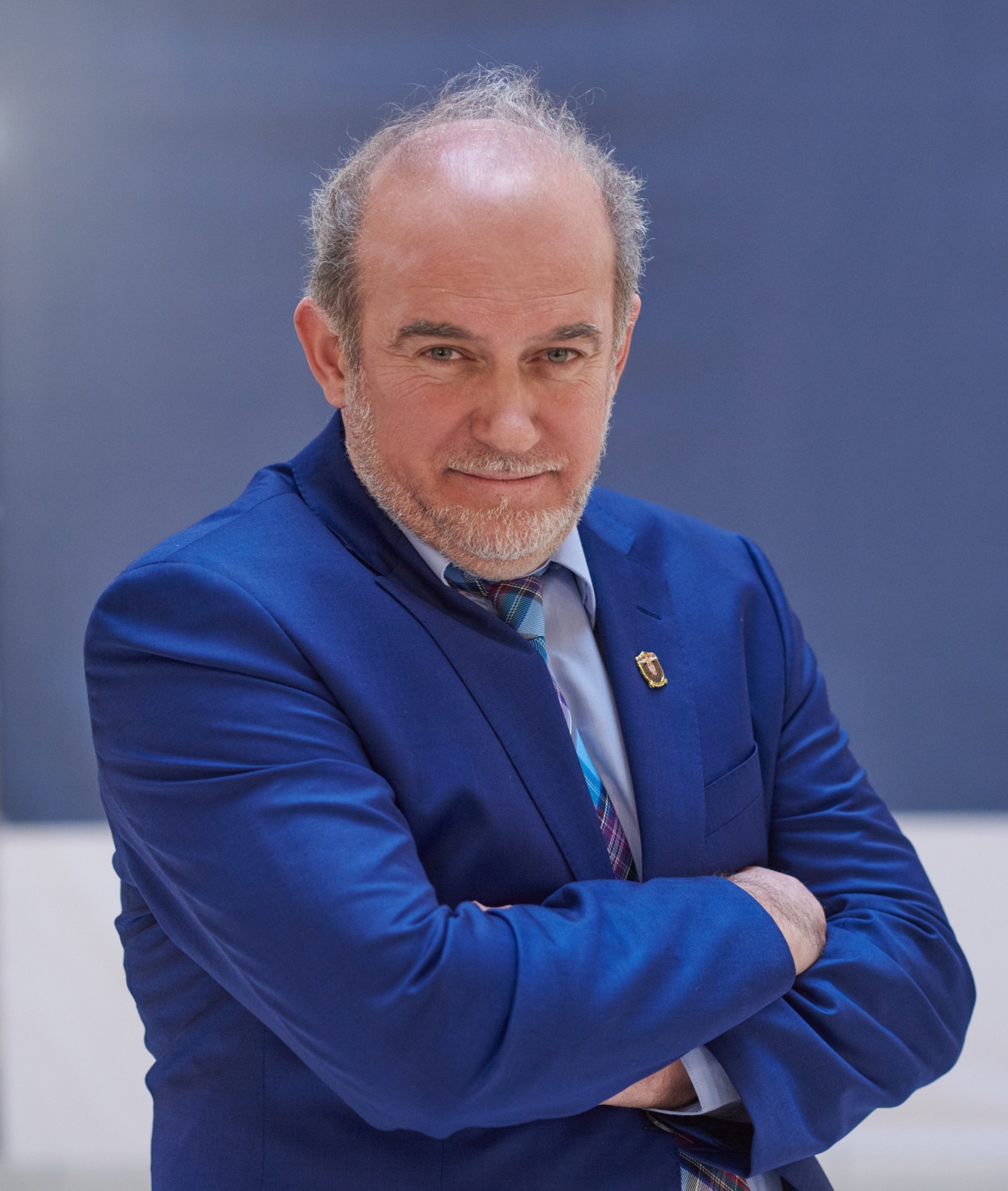
Milan Marinović, the incumbent Commissioner, appointed in July 2019.

Access to public information and freedom of information (FOI) refer to the right of access to information held by public bodies also known as "right to know". Access to public information is considered of fundamental importance for the effective functioning of democratic systems, as it enhances governments' and public officials' accountability, boosting people participation and allowing their informed participation into public life. The fundamental premise of the right of access to public information is that the information held by governmental institutions is in principle public and may be concealed only on the basis of legitimate reasons which should be detailed in the law.

In Serbia, access to public information is guaranteed in the Constitution and protected by the Law on free Access to Information of Public Importance adopted in 2003 and amended in 2007, 2009, 2010, and 2021. The scope of the right entails that everyone in Serbia has the right to access to information of public importance and to be informed whether public authorities hold specific information, whether such information is already accessible, and to obtain a copy of the requested information. The Commissioner for Information of Public Importance and Personal Data Protection is the authority entitled by law to monitor the respect of obligations entailed by this Law.

== Legal framework ==
Serbia is considered among the countries with the best regulatory framework regarding access to information of public relevance: the Global Right to Information Rating, compiled by NGOs AccessInfo and Centre for Law and Democracy, ranks the country in the second position in its global ranking assessing the quality of legislative frameworks regulating FOI across the world.

The right of access to public information is defined in Article 51 of the Constitution of Serbia, which establishes the right of everybody to be informed about issues of public importance and the deriving obligation of state bodies and public organizations to guarantee the access to such information.

The right to access to information of public relevance is translated into national law by the Law on Free Access to Information of Public Importance adopted in 2003 and amended in 2007 and 2009. The latest amendments to the Law, applying as of 17 February 2022, broadened the definition of public bodies bound by its provisions, strengthened the position of the Commissioner in terms of enforcement of his decisions, and enabled him to lodge misdemeanor complaints and issue misdemeanor orders.

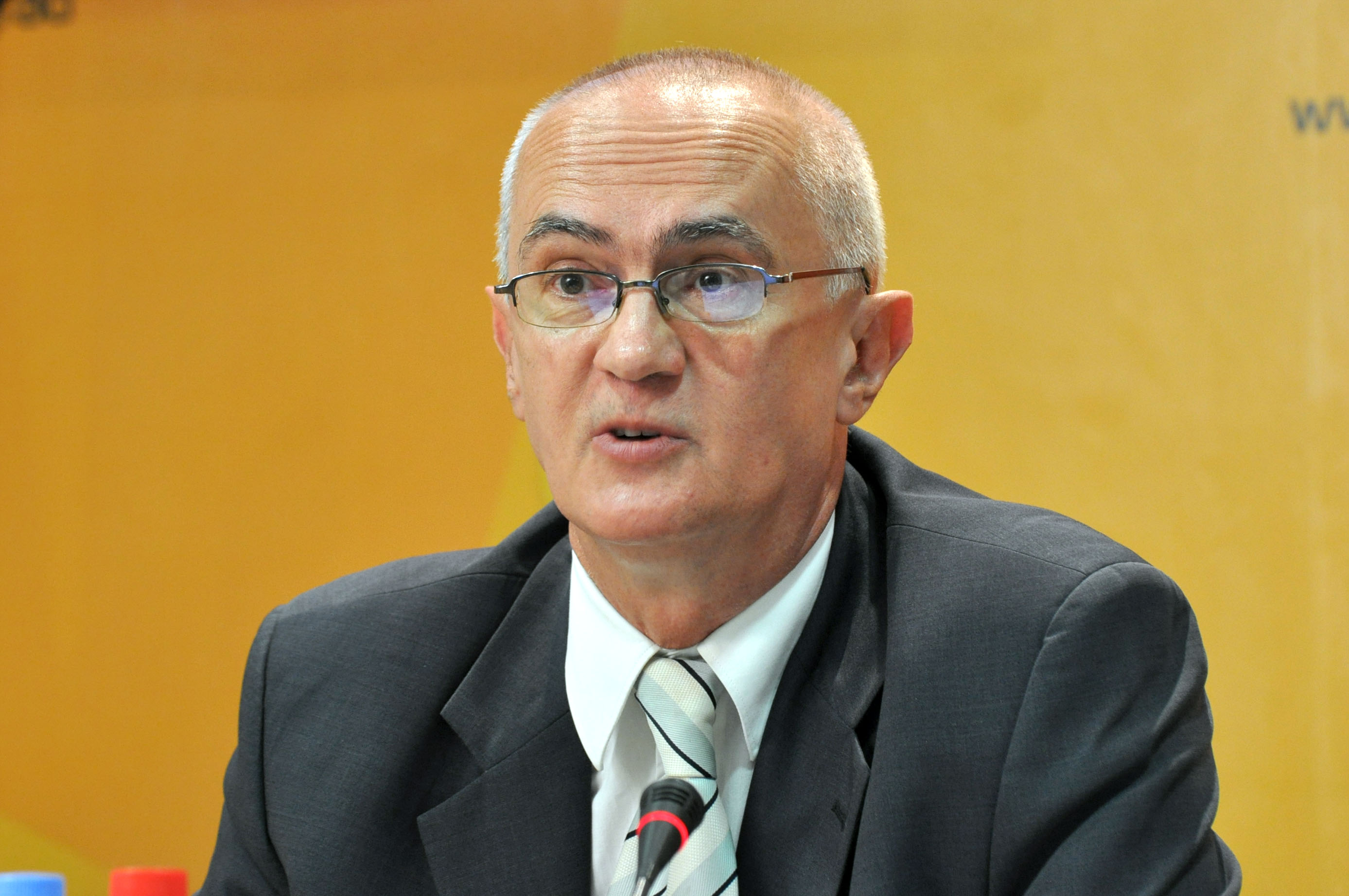
Rodoljub Šabić, first Commissioner for Information and protection of personal data (2004-2018)

The scope of the law is valued positively especially inasmuch as it extends the right to access to information to all natural person, notwithstanding their citizenship, temporary or permanent residence in the country. Moreover, the right to access information applies to the executive, legislative and judicial bodies, State-owned enterprises, as well as other public authorities and private bodies that perform a public function or that receive significant public funding are also obliged to disclose information of public relevance (Art. 3).

Requests should be lodged in written form, with no need for the applicant to specify the reason for the request. The public authority shall reply without delay and within 15 days at the latest. If the requested information entails consequences for the protection of a person's life or freedom, public health and the environment, the time span at the disposal of authorities is reduced to 48 hours. In cases in which the document contains information that the public has no legitimate interest to know, the applicant has the right to access to other parts of the documents.

Limitations to the right to access to information are defined in Article 9 of the Law, establishing that legitimate limitation may derive if the requested information exposes to risk the life, health, safety or another vital interest of a person; if it obstacles the work of the judiciary; if it threatens national defense, national and public safety, international relations or the government's ability to manage the national economic processes. Finally, classified information are excluded from the right.

The authority in charge of monitoring the respect of the Law is the Commissioner for Information of Public Importance. The Commissioner is an independent, second-level appeal instance: if a public authority does not respond to the request within the deadline, the applicant may lodge a complaint with the Commissioner, except in cases prescribed by this Law (Art.16).

The Commissioner is entitled by Law to issue decisions on disputed cases, and his/her decisions should be enforced by the Government of the Republic of Serbia if necessary (Art 28). The Commissioner is appointed by the National Assembly of the Republic of Serbia on proposal of the Committee of the National Assembly responsible for information. The position of the Commissioner for Information was held by Rodoljub Šabić, who was appointed for an initial 7-years term and then re-elected in 2011. The incumbent Commissioner Milan Marinović was appointed in July 2019.

Aside from examining individual complaints related to violations of the right to free access to information, the Commissioner also addresses citizens’ requests asking how to exercise their right to information, provides to state authorities opinions about the implementation of the law, trainings for law implementation and takes part in activities related to the EU accession process.

It has been noted that a significant limitation of the right set forth in the Constitution is due to the restrictions applied to the admissibility of complaints against first instance decisions: a complaint is not admissible if “lodged against decisions of the National Assembly, the President of the Republic, the Government of the Republic of Serbia, the Supreme Court of Serbia, the Constitutional Court, the National Bank of Serbia, and the Republic Public Prosecutor” (Art. 22).

== Access to public information in practice ==
Since the adoption of the Law on Access to Information in 2004, a significant increase in the number of requests has been registered by the entitled Commissioner, pointing to the positive fact that the right is increasing being used by citizens and media professionals in Serbia. At the same time, the increasing number of complaints filed to the Commissioner demonstrates the reluctancy by authorities to timely and fully comply with the obligation established by the Law on access to information.

In its annual report for 2015, the Commissioner for Information notes some limitation to the effective implementation of the law. These have to do, according to the Commissioner, particularly with insufficient accountability for violations of the Law and inefficient mechanisms of enforcement of the Commissioner’s decisions.

Considering the implementation of the Law on Access to Information in Serbia and its impact on the exercise of journalism, Freedom House has noted in 2016 that “Despite the existence of the 2004 Law on Free Access to Information of Public Importance, authorities frequently obstruct journalists’ efforts to obtain public information”.

Concern over implementation, alignment with European standards, endowment of resources to the Commissioner for Information and enforcement of his decisions is highlighted also by the European Union in its annual report.

=== Youth Initiative for Human Rights v. Serbia ===
A landmark case by the European Court of Human Rights related to the right to access to information in Serbia. In 2006, the Belgrade-based NGO Youth Initiative for Human Rights (YIHR) filed a request to the Serbian Security Intelligence Agency demanding information concerning the use of electronic surveillance measures by that agency in 2005. The Agency denied access to the requested information twice, first on grounds of secrecy and then, after a binding decision by the Commissioner for Information stating that the information should be made public, by declaring that it did not hold the requested information.

YIHR appealed to the European Court of Human Rights under Article 6 and Article 10 of the Convention. In June 2013, the verdict of the ECtHR defined “unpersuasive” the argument used by the Agency according to which it did not hold the information requested and found that the restrictions imposed by the Serbian intelligence agency were not justified by domestic law and hence constituted a violation of article 10 of the European Convention on Human Rights.

== See also ==
- Freedom of information laws by country: Serbia
- Access to public information in Europe
- Freedom of information
- List of libraries in Serbia
- Transparency of media ownership in Europe
- Media of Serbia
- Transparency of media ownership in Serbia
- Media freedom in Serbia
