= List of libraries in Serbia =

This is a list of libraries in Serbia.

== Libraries by province ==
=== Central Serbia ===
- Belgrade City Library
- Belgrade University Library
- Bor Public Library
- Čačak City Library Vladislav Petković Dis
- Leskovac National Library Radoje Domanović
- Milutin Bojić Library, Belgrade
- National Library of Serbia, Belgrade
- Nikola Tesla University Library, Niš
- Novi Pazar National Library Dositej Obradović
- Smederevo National Library
- University Library in Kragujevac
- Užice National Library

=== Kosovo and Metohija (Note: While Kosovo considers itself an independent country, Serbia still regards it as its province. See also International recognition of Kosovo.) ===
- Mitrovica City Library
- National Library of Kosovo
- Prishtinа City Library

=== Vojvodina ===
- City Public Library Žarko Zrenjanin
- Matica srpska library, Novi Sad
- Novi Sad City Library
- Pančevo City Library
- Subotica City Library

== See also ==
- Access to public information in Serbia
- COBISS (Co-operative Online Bibliographic System and Services), regional library network in Eastern Europe
- Copyright law of Serbia
- List of archives in Serbia
- Mass media in Serbia
- Serbian literature

in Serbian

- KoBSON, Serbian Library Consortium for Coordinated Acquisition (in Serbian)
- Librarianship in Serbia (in Serbian)
- Serbian Library Association (in Serbian)
- Serbian School Librarians Association (in Serbian)
