= E-novine =

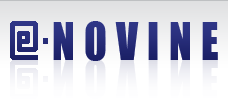
- Available in: Serbian
- Owner: E-NOVINE d.o.o.
- Creator: Srđan Kusovac
- Key people: Petar Luković (editor-in-chief); Branislav Jelić; Bojan Tončić
- Website: www.e-novine.com
- Commercial: Yes
- Launched: November 2007
- Current status: Inactive

E-novine was a web portal that published news and commentary from the former Yugoslav countries.

Based in Belgrade, edited by Petar Luković, and "published in Bosnian, Croatian, Serbian and Montenegrin languages", E-novine has pro-Western, pro-EU editorial policy. It is also known for its willingness to print defamatory and controversial stories based on rumour and hearsay in the vein of UK's Private Eye or Canada's Frank.

E-novine articles employ a subjective writing style, with elements of gonzo journalism, and are abundant in quotations, sarcasm, satire, and profanity. E-novine's claims its editorial policy is not aimed at objective and global journalism; it mostly publishes critiques and opinion pieces that scrutinize the day-to-day politics of former Yugoslav republics as well as wider trends within the respective countries' societies. Apart from politics, the portal also deals with issues concerning society, culture, economy, sports and entertainment.

E-novine has faced numerous libel lawsuits, including two by Emir Kusturica and one by journalist Stojan Drčelić.

== History ==
E-novine was founded in November 2007 with Srđan Kusovac as its first editor-in-chief.

Petar Luković took over on 30 May 2008, bringing in a new editorial staff. Referring to itself as "our small heretical medium" due to what it considers to be its own marginalized position on the Serbian media scene, E-novine decided to devote particular attention to Serbian war crimes in the Yugoslav Wars as well as the role Serbian media had in the Yugoslav Wars. The majority of articles it published were harsh political satires and denouncements (written by Luković, Marković, Dežulović, Lucić and others) while s significant portion of the articles is being written by its readers. According to the website's About Us page, by the end of 2008, visits to the site increased dramatically and the number of visitors went up several hundred percent compared to the previous period with over a half of the new traffic coming from the ex-Yugoslav countries rather than Serbia itself.

During late summer 2009 E-novine reportedly faced a shut-down due to financial problems, which the portal claimed were caused by "the pressure from the Serbian regime". The web site remained in business, though, reportedly with the help of its readers' donations.

The beginning of 2010 reportedly led to another critical point under government pressure through its advertisers, and E-novine appealed to its readers again. At the time, editor-in-chief Luković claimed that "only media outlets loyal to then Serbian president Boris Tadić are allowed to be profitable", furthermore claiming that "web advertising in Serbia is monopolized by a handful of agencies, all owned or operated by people with close professional and personal ties to Tadić and the Democratic Party". Nevertheless, Luković vowed E-novine "will continue to be completely independent and keep reexamining any regime that may be in power".

In February 2010, the portal's editor-in-chief Petar Luković described its policy:

We have principles that are completely incompatible with journalism - first of all, there is no such thing as objective journalism, there is no other side, we are not interested in any facts from their pro-fascist repertoire, we don’t tolerate any hate speech of the right wing. Right-wing people, fanatics, various lunatics – you simply can't find them here. This portal is our small island of its own kind through which we communicate with normal people who still have some common sense left.

=== Serbian Progressive Party (SNS) ad banner ===
In spring 2012, during the 2012 Serbian parliamentary, presidential, provincial, and local election campaign, E-novine ran a Serbian Progressive Party (SNS) banner on its front page thus endorsing the political party led by Aleksandar Vučić and Tomislav Nikolić, both of whom had previously, for almost two decades, been among the leaders of the far-right Serbian Radical Party (SRS). In reaction, E-novine and its editor Petar Luković received vitriolic, profanity-laced criticism from Nermin Čengić, E-novine's occasional contributor whose Protest.ba pieces were often re-posted on the E-novine portal.

Writing on Protest.ba, revolted by Luković's paid endorsement of Tomislav Nikolić and SNS, Čengić demanded revocation of Luković's honorary citizenship in Sarajevo awarded to him during Alija Behmen's mayoral term. Luković responded to Čengić's denouncement by posting a piece on E-novine. It began in sarcastic fashion, before turning serious, defending himself by stating that a paid political ad doesn't constitute the portal's editorial policy switch toward supporting SNS. He ended the response by including private messages of support he received over this issue from the Montenegrin writer and Montenegro parliamentary speaker's media adviser Andrej Nikolaidis as well as Montenegrin journalist Tamara Nikčević. Furthermore, Luković's written response contains claims of Čengić's statements supposedly verbalized in a private phone conversation with Luković, such as the one that 'all political parties in Serbia are proponents of the Chetnik ideology', which Luković then used as basis to dismiss Čengić as an "intellectual Taliban". Čengić responded to this claim by denying he ever made such a remark to Luković in the said phone call before proceeding to further denounce Luković as a "sellout" and a "liar".

=== Pro-Vučić editorial policy ===
Following the 2012 parliamentary elections in Serbia that saw the Serbian Progressive Party (SNS) of Aleksandar Vučić and Tomislav Nikolić form a ruling coalition with Ivica Dačić's Socialist Party of Serbia (SPS), Luković's E-novine made the editorial shift towards unequivocally supporting Aleksandar Vučić, the newly formed cabinet's first deputy prime minister. This led to criticism from Luković's longtime political and ideological allies such as Mirjana Miočinović, Danilo Kiš's widow, who wrote him an open letter in August 2013, reprimanding and reproaching the E-novine editor-in-chief over his refusal to post articles and pieces by authors critical of Vučić. Luković responded in mocking tone without addressing any of Miočinović's specific points, accusing her of doing the bidding for the Democratic Party (DS) and Liberal Democratic Party (LDP).

== Editorial staff ==
Petar Luković is the portal's editor-in-chief while Branislav Jelić is its director. Editorial office drew a dozen of junior editors and journalists from Belgrade, in addition to contributors from the entire region of Balkans such as Emir Imamović, Andrej Nikolaidis, Filip David, Mirko Kovač, Čedomir Petrović, Nenad Veličković, Dženana Karabegović, Ljubomir Živkov and many others. Initially, the portal reunited the former staff of Feral Tribune from Split: Heni Erceg, Viktor Ivančić, Boris Dežulović and Predrag Lucić.

== Financing ==
In 2013, E-novine received US$35,000 from the National Endowment for Democracy (NED).

== Libel lawsuits ==
=== Emir Kusturica ===
In February 2011 E-novine and its editor-in-chief Petar Luković were sued by film director Emir Kusturica over a mid-January 2011 online piece written by Zoran Janić and Miroslav Bojčić headlined "Novogodišnja bajka za ubice" (A New Year's Fairy Tale for Murderers) that was carried by E-novine, having originally been posted on Pescanik.net. The piece alleges the famous director was a liaison of convicted hitman and contract killer Veselin Vukotić as well as an information and money courier between on-the-run Vukotić and then Serbian State Security Service chief Jovica Stanišić. Kusturica additionally sued the piece's authors Janić and Bojčić as well as B92 company, which is the owner of the Pescanik.net internet domain.

Month and a half later in March 2011 Kusturica sued E-novine and Luković again, this time over a piece "Jedna mala sarajevska analiza" (A Small Sarajevo Analysis) written by Nermin Čengić that features profanity-laced vitriolic insults and denunciations of Kusturica, which E-novine ran in reaction to Kustrica's lawsuit.

In April 2013, the Belgrade Higher Court ruled in Kusturica's favour in the "Jedna mala sarajevska analiza" case, ordering E-novine to pay RSD150,000 as well as additionally requiring them to publish the court's ruling on their site without commentary. E-novine appealed the Higher Court's decision.

In December 2013, the Belgrade Higher Court ruled in Kusturica's favour in the "Novogodišnja bajka za ubice" case, ordering E-novine and its chief editor Luković to pay Kusturica RSD336,000 in addition requiring them to publish the court's ruling on their site without commentary. E-novine appealed the Higher Court's decision.

In separate decisions on 16 January 2015 and 20 January 2015, the Court of Appeals upheld and confirmed the Higher Court rulings in two cases — "Jedna mala sarajevska analiza" and "Novogodišnja bajka za ubice", respectively — ordering E-novine and Luković to pay Kusturica the total sum of RSD396,800.

== Reception ==
=== Positive ===
Writing in September 2009, Serbia-based journalist Branka Mihajlović of the United States Congress funded Radio Free Europe/Radio Liberty referred to E-novine's editor-in-chief Luković as being "adored in the rest of the former Yugoslavia as much as he is despised in Serbia" while calling the portal a "specific project whose readers are most likely the same people who during Yugoslav Wars waited for Vreme each Friday to wipe down their soul or who bought Feral Tribune when such an act was life-threatening". In January 2010, she described the portal as an "outlet that publishes pieces by authors from all over the ex-Yugoslav region with a pronounced antiwar and anti-nationalist profile".

Also in September 2009, Bosnian journalist and E-novine contributor Emir Imamović considered E-novine to be a media outlet where "one can find something to hang his/her hat on" while adding that the portal "won over the readers who grew up with Feral Tribune, BH Dani, and Slobodna Bosna". Croatian journalist and author Ante Tomić said E-novine established itself as the first ex-Yugoslavia region-wide media outlet that transcends national and state boundaries.

=== Negative ===
E-novine faced numerous instances of criticism from right-wing and nationalist circles, most notably far-right nationalist outlet Nova srpska politička misao.

Aiming at objectivity and facing the arguments of the other side is the basic principle of how public opinion works. Being a journalist and denying objectivity at the same time is the negation of media practice itself.

Critics assume that repudiations of objectivity and 'giving the other side of an argument' show how E-novine's editorial office understands the freedom of the press: “there’s no freedom for the enemy of freedom.” They state that e-novine uses “appealing humor as a political resource against those who are not like-minded", namely nationalists, as a rule. E-novine is further criticized for allegedly not allowing the hate language from right-wing while allowing the equivalent from the left-wing.

Slobodan Antonić of Nova srpska politička misao summarized E-novine in June 2009 as "the Other Serbia's tabloid whose online pieces have one purpose and one purpose only — to stimulate its readers' salivary glands to the point where they can, by repeatedly spitting out their contempt all over the comments section, advance the narrative of Serbia being an evil and fascist country". He then pointed out E-novine's 21 June 2009 piece headlined "Čik progovori mađarski u Srbiji" — about two men who allege to have been approached and assaulted in a Novi Sad city transit bus by a random passenger, allegedly just for having spoken Hungarian during the ride — while specifically focusing on the piece's comment section featuring published reader reaction such as: "You don't fight Serbs with words, you fight them with weapons. Shoot first, ask questions later. There will be no peace as long as there's a single Serb walking the Balkans and the world. My deepest sympathies for the brave Hungarian lads, but they've got no one to blame but themselves. From 1992 onward they should have refused the mandatory military service in the Chetnik army; by now they could have had a real guerrilla army that could have been attacking police stations, blowing up bridges, and preparing the liberation of Vojvodina from Serb occupation". All comments as well as the original piece were taken down by E-novine after Antonić's criticism.

Strahinja Bogdanović accused E-novine in June 2009 of “vulgarity” and “profane insults”, stating they are in the service of the Liberal Democratic Party (LDP), which is usually spared their criticism. On the other hand, LDP member Nenad Prokić made veiled accusations that internet portals E-novine and Pescanik caused the party to perform poorly at the local elections in the Belgrade municipality of Voždovac.

In May 2012, after himself being targeted in multiple insulting write-ups on the portal, prominent Serbian leftist columnist Teofil Pančić referred to E-novine as the Kurir of 'Other Serbia', a launchpad for cyber-lynching, and an outlet that has long ago degenerated into a specific kind of aggressive tabloid. He further continued: "E-novine welcome all manner of personal attacks, slander, and insults, directed at whoever is marked as a convenient target at a particular time. They began by targeting their traditional 'ideological enemies' from the Serbian public sphere (like Ljilja Smajlović for example whom they repeatedly eviscerated through constant mocking over physical traits and personal insults like obsessively bringing up her bangs and tits, etc.), but once the obvious enemies have all been shot dead over and over again so much so that the supply ran out and the shtick became tiresome, E-novine turned on their former friends from the anti-Milošević struggle. Then they began taking apart those that have similar political views for the unforgivable sin of those views not being perfectly 100% in line with E-novines own. Finally, even those having the exact same views weren't above being degraded as punishment for not expressing them aggressively enough for E-novine's liking. Basically, any little thing, no matter how small, becomes the basis for a barrage of insults. The assassination technique is always the same: first, a junior member of their newsroom grabs hold of you, covers you in feces, and throws you into a frying pan to crackle in cooking oil before leaving you to the anonymous cyber lynch-mob in the comments section that then dismembers you like rats eating a cadaver".
