= Marko Milošević (disambiguation) =

Marko Milošević is a Serbian alleged criminal. It is also the name of:

- Marko Milošević (Serbian politician), his son
- Marko Milošević (football manager) (born 1952)
- Marko Milošević (footballer) (born 1991)
