= Marko Milošević =

Serbian politician

- Марко Милошевић
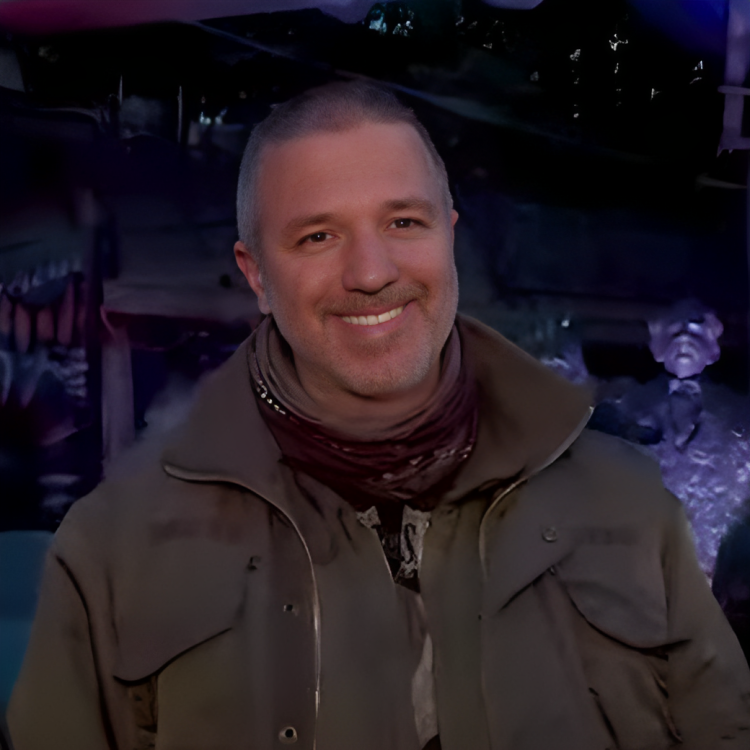
- Milošević in Moscow, 2023
- Born: Marko Slobodanov Milošević; 3 July 1974 (age 52); Belgrade, SR Serbia, SFR Yugoslavia
- Spouse: Milica Gajić (div.)
- Children: Marko M. Milošević
- Parents: Slobodan Milošević (father); Mirjana Marković (mother)
- Relatives: Moma Marković (grandfather); Vera Miletić (grandmother); Borislav Milošević (uncle); Milisav Koljenšić (great-uncle)

Marko Slobodanov Milošević (Serbian Cyrillic: Марко Слободанов Милошевић; Russian: Марко Слободанов Милошевич; born 3 July 1974) is the son of Mirjana Marković and Slobodan Milošević, the deceased former president of Serbia and president of the Federal Republic of Yugoslavia. He was allegedly involved in organized crime in Serbia during the Yugoslav Wars until he fled the country following his father's removal from power on 5 October 2000. Milošević was later granted refugee status by Russia.

== Early life ==
Marko Milošević was born in 1974 in Belgrade. At the time, his mother, Mirjana Marković, was a professor of sociology at the University of Belgrade and his father Slobodan Milošević was beginning to develop status in national politics. Marko was named after a legendary family ancestor of the Milošević family, a Serbian chieftain who fought against Turks in the 18th century and is recorded in Serbian folk poems. Milošević's early years have been described as host to numerous high-level political visits, with the young Milošević apparently holding a familial, paternal relationship with Serbian President Ivan Stambolić.

Milošević was raised atheist, although his father promoted the sociopolitical and nationalist connections of the family with the Serbian Orthodox Church. Milošević's mother taught astrology to Marko and his ten-year-older sister Marija. Milošević was widely reported a spoilt teenager, manipulative, uninterested in schooling, and self-conscious about his skinniness.

At a private school in Belgrade, he lived with his mother's extended family in Požarevac, having more personal exposure to bodyguards than to his parents. He also began collecting guns and cars, and dropped out of high school.

== Organized crime ==
Taking an interest in car racing, Milošević's first exposure to the profitability of organized crime came from interactions with racing team member Vlada Kovačević, who sold vehicles to Serbian paramilitary commanders operating in Croatia and Bosnia and Herzegovina. After dodging the military draft by being deemed "unfit" for service, Milošević turned to his father's access to state revenue to fund a lavish lifestyle and establish a criminal network in Požarevac. Around 1994, Milošević was provided a job running a newly retrofit night club in Požarevac called Madona that catered to the elites of southeastern Europe, including wanted members of Serbian organized criminal organizations. Milošević is accused of involvement in smuggling numerous goods through Serbia, including cigarettes, petroleum, stolen cars, and drugs such as cocaine, which he is purported to use. Milošević also took ownership of a radio station, bakery, computer store, luxury perfume shop named Scandal, and was appointed deputy chairman of a horse show in Ljubičevo. Other sources of revenue included currency speculation and trade between dinars and Deutsche marks, and management of the construction of a $380,000 Serbian nationalist theme park called Bambipark. Milošević would wear a military uniform while managing Bambipark to show his patriotism during the NATO bombing of Yugoslavia. By 1998, he had purchased an expansive new villa in Požarevac, owned and crashed over 17 luxury cars, and purchased a yacht for 500,000 Deutsche Marks. In 2000, the total black market assets held by Milošević were estimated at £500 million. Milošević used violence and intimidation to expand and control his black market empire, suppressing rival gangs and the Serbian media. This use of violence included alleged connections to the 15 January 2000 killing of paramilitary leader and business competitor Željko Ražnatović in Belgrade.

== Fall of Slobodan Milošević ==
On 5 October 2000, Slobodan Milošević's administration was replaced by the Democratic Opposition of Serbia. This removed Marko from access to state revenue, power, and protection. Scandal and Madona were both vandalized and destroyed by anti-Milošević demonstrators. Marko fled Serbia for Moscow with his sister Marija, mother Mira, and uncle Borislav. He then attempted to continue on to Beijing, but was deported back to Russia on 9 October 2000 for possession of a fake passport.

Milošević may have attempted to travel to China because of the £100 million allegedly laundered into Chinese banks by the Milošević family. After fleeing Serbia, a factional conflict broke out among the Serbian mafia to seize the local power and assets previously held by Marko. Organized crime remains a major security issue in Serbia. Marko Milošević's location is not known. Russia has granted Marko and his family refugee status, although he is wanted by the Serbian government for several offenses, and has been issued a travel ban by the European Union. In June 2023, Milošević was seen at the unveiling of the monument to his father in Moscow, making his first public appearance after many years. Milošević was accompanied by members of the Night Wolves.

== Complaints over father's death ==
Marko Milošević sent a letter to the President of the ICTY, The Chairman of the Security Council of the OUN, The Secretary General of the OUN, and to Judge Parker who led the investigation into Slobodan Milošević's death accusing the Hague Tribunal for negligence and for the death of his father.
