= Marko Milošević (Serbian politician) =

Serbian politician (born 1999)

- Марко Милошевић

Member of the National Assembly of the Republic of Serbia
- Incumbent
- Assumed office 6 February 2024

Personal details
- Born: 14 January 1999 (age 27) Požarevac, Serbia, FR Yugoslavia
- Party: SPS
- Parent: Marko Milošević (father)
- Relatives: Slobodan Milošević (grandfather), Mirjana Marković (grandmother)
- Education: University of Belgrade

Marko M. Milošević (Serbian Cyrillic: Марко М. Милошевић; born 14 January 1999) is a Serbian politician. He has served in the Serbian national assembly since February 2024 as a member of the Socialist Party of Serbia (SPS). Milošević is the grandson of Slobodan Milošević and Mirjana Marković and the son of Marko S. Milošević and Milanka Gajić.

== Early years ==
The newspaper Danas has observed that Milošević, through no "fault, participation, or merit of his own," has been a public figure in Serbia since before his birth. His mother's pregnancy and the fact that then-Yugoslavian president Slobodan Milošević would soon become a grandfather were recognized as "political facts" in late 1998.

Marko M. Milošević was born on the evening of Thursday, 14 January 1999, in the Milošević family's hometown of Požarevac. Glas javnosti ran an article on his birth the following Monday, depicting or possibly inventing the celebrations afterward in the Milošević household. His father was offended by the article and entered the Glas javnosti newsroom on Tuesday morning, armed with a large gun and flanked by two bodyguards. He made threats toward the article's author, Dragan Vučićević (who was not present), and toward others employed by the paper. Danas subsequently reported on these events, which were covered in the international media and created a scandal for the government.

Slobodan Milošević fell from power in October 2000. In announcing his departure from office in a televised address, he said that he looked forward to having more time to play with his grandson. He was later extradited to The Hague and tried for war crimes by the International Criminal Tribunal for the former Yugoslavia (ICTY), dying in 2006 while the trial was still in progress. The ICTY and the successor International Residual Mechanism for Criminal Tribunals ultimately concluded that Milošević was part of a joint criminal enterprise for the removal of non-Serb populations from parts of the former Socialist Federal Republic of Yugoslavia.

After Slobodan Milošević's fall from power, the younger Marko Milošević was raised in Požarevac by his mother, who was by this time separated from his father. He did not inherit his father's brash demeanour but was a diligent student, moderate in his behaviour. He has said that some of his fellow students initially treated him with reserve but that those who took the time to know him found him to be neither arrogant nor rude.

Milošević is a graduate of the University of Belgrade Faculty of Law and is a doctoral student in the same faculty as of March 2024. An article in NIN from that time described him as a "quiet and well-behaved young man."

== Politician ==
Milošević joined the Socialist Party of Serbia in 2016. In July 2023, he was elected to the party's main board at the proposal of party leader Ivica Dačić. On the latter occasion, Milošević described the idea of the SPS as "eternal."

He appeared in the third position on the Socialist Party's electoral list in the 2023 Serbian parliamentary election. This was tantamount to election, and he was indeed elected when the list won eighteen seats. He is a member of the assembly's labour committee (Note: Formally known as the Committee on Labour, Social Issues, Social Inclusion, and Poverty Reduction.) and a deputy member of the administrative committee, (Note: Formally known as the Committee on Administrative, Budgetary, Mandate, and Immunity Issues.) the committee on constitutional and legislative issues, and the committee on the diaspora and Serbs in the region. He is the head of Serbia's parliamentary friendship group with Venezuela and a member of thirty-six other friendship groups. (Note: He is a member of the friendship groups with Algeria, Austria, Azerbaijan, the Baltic States, the Benelux countries, Brazil, China, Cuba, Cyprus, the Czech Republic, Denmark, Eritrea, Finland, France, Germany, Greece, Hungary, India, Ireland, Italy and the Holy See, Japan, Mali, Malta, Nicaragua, Norway, Poland, Portugal, Romania, Slovakia, the countries of Southeast Asia (Brunei Darussalam, Cambodia, Indonesia, Laos, Malaysia, Myanmar, the Philippines, Singapore, Thailand, Vietnam), Spain, Sweden, Switzerland, and the United Arab Emirates, the United Kingdom, the United States of America.)

The election of Slobodan Milošević's grandson to the Serbian parliament has prompted much discussion. Although Marko Milošević has never talked publicly about his father or grandfather in any great detail, he told the tabloid newspaper Kurir in 2016 that his grandfather was his political hero.

In March 2024, NIN interviewed Uroš Stambolić – the grandson of Ivan Stambolić, whose 2000 assassination was later determined by the Supreme Court of Serbia to have been ordered by Slobodan Milošević – about Marko Milošević's entry into public life. Stambolić responded, "Even though he cannot be guilty for his grandfather’s crimes simply because he is his grandson, he has an even greater responsibility to fight against the glorification of Slobodan Milošević. Sloba [nickname for Slobodan Milošević] is his grandfather and he is being presented in public as Milošević’s grandson, and not as an independent person with merits of his own. Since he is not doing it, not distancing himself from that politics, it is clear that both he and the SPS are looking to glorify Sloba."
