= Borislav Milošević =

Yugoslav diplomat

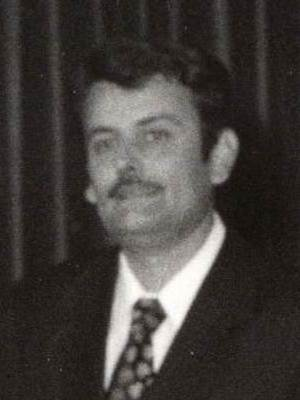
- Borislav Milošević

Personal details
- Born: 8 July 1934 Nikšić, Yugoslavia
- Died: 29 January 2013 (aged 78) Belgrade, Serbia
- Relatives: Slobodan Milošević (brother)

Borislav Milošević (Serbian Cyrillic: Борислав Милошевић; 8 July 1934 – 29 January 2013) was a Yugoslav diplomat who last served as Yugoslav ambassador to Algeria, Japan and Russia. He was the elder brother of former Yugoslav and Serbian president Slobodan Milošević.

== Biography ==
Milošević started his career in the international sector of Central Committee of SKJ. His diplomatic career began during the 1970s in the Soviet Union. Thanks to his excellent knowledge of Russian he became the personal translator to Tito during the latter's confidential meetings with Brezhnev. In 1998, he was appointed FRY ambassador to Moscow, the position he kept until the fifth October changes. After stepping down, he continued to live in Moscow. He died in UHC Dedinje and was buried in Lijeva Rijeka, Montenegro.
