= Mirjana Marković =

Serbian academic, journalist and politician

- Мирјана Марковић
- Marković in 1989

First Lady of the Socialist Republic of Serbia
- In office 8 May 1989 – 28 September 1990

First Lady of the Republic of Serbia
- In office 11 January 1991 – 23 July 1997

First Lady of the Federal Republic of Yugoslavia
- In office 23 July 1997 – 7 October 2000
- Preceded by: Ljubica Brković Lilić
- Succeeded by: Zorica Radović

Personal details
- Born: 10 July 1942 Požarevac, German-occupied Serbia
- Died: 14 April 2019 (aged 76) Moscow, Russia
- Resting place: Požarevac, Serbia
- Party: SKJ (until 1990); SK–PJ (1990–1994); JUL (1994–2003)
- Spouse: Slobodan Milošević (m. 1965; died 2006)
- Children: 2, including Marko
- Parents: Moma Marković (father); Vera Miletić (mother)
- Relatives: Marko Milošević (grandson)
- Occupation: Ph.D in Sociology
- Employer: University of Belgrade
- Criminal charge: Abuse of Office by Incitement
- Criminal status: Fugitive; Died during trial in absentia

Mirjana "Mira" Marković (Serbian Cyrillic: Мирјана "Мира" Марковић, pronounced [mǐrjana mǐːra mǎːrkovitɕ]; 10 July 1942 – 14 April 2019) was a Serbian politician, academic and the wife of Yugoslav and Serbian president Slobodan Milošević.

She was the leader of the far-left Yugoslav United Left (JUL) which governed in coalition with Milošević's Socialist Party of Serbia in the aftermath of the Bosnian War. She was reported to have huge influence over her husband and was increasingly seen as the power behind the throne. Among her opponents, she was known as The Red Witch and the Lady Macbeth of Belgrade.

Marković was accused of abuse of office, inciting several associates to allocate a state-owned apartment for her grandson’s nanny in September 2000. She was indicted in December 2002 and fled Belgrade on 23 February 2003. In June 2018, she was declared guilty in absentia by a court in Belgrade, and sentenced to a year's imprisonment, but the verdict was overturned on appeal in March 2019.

Marković lived under political asylum in Moscow, Russia, from February 2003 until her death in 2019.

== Life ==
=== Early life ===
Marković was the daughter of Moma Marković and Vera Miletić, who were both fighting for the Yugoslav Partisans at the time of her birth. Her aunt was Davorjanka Paunović, private secretary and alleged mistress of Josip Broz Tito. Her mother Vera was captured by German troops and allegedly released sensitive information, under torture. She was then executed in the Banjica concentration camp by the Nazis.

Marković met Slobodan Milošević when they were in high school together. They married in 1965. The couple had two children, son Marko and daughter Marija, who founded TV Košava in 1998 and was its owner until the overthrow of Milošević on 5 October 2000.

=== Education and career ===
Marković held a Ph.D. in sociology and taught the subject at the University of Belgrade. Later, she became an honorary member of the Russian Academy of Sciences.

She was considered to be the only person her husband trusted, her influence being considered a source for the increase in Milošević strong anti-western rhetoric and actions. "She invented him", Milošević biographer Slavoljub Đukić told the Ottawa Citizen in 1998. "There has never been such a powerful woman in the history of Serbia as Mirjana Marković. And she has been fatal for Serbia." As the leader of her own political party, Yugoslav United Left she held some political influence. Marković was largely responsible for erecting the Eternal Flame monument, shortly before the overthrow of Milošević in 2000. She was believed, though not formally accused, of being involved in the murders of her husband's political rivals including the Serbian politician Ivan Stambolić, Milošević's former mentor, in 2000, and the journalist Slavko Ćuruvija the previous year. "Milošević has never had any political ideas of his own", Stambolić said in 2000. "They've all been hers." She wrote a political column in the weekly Serbian magazine Duga during the sequence of wars in the 1990s. Observers read it for any coded messages. In the old Yugoslavia, she once wrote "Serbs, Muslims and Croats were able to live side by side", though her husband and his associates presided over its destruction.

Marković was the author of many books, which were translated and sold in Canada, Russia, China, and India.

=== Political views ===
Marković's political views tended to be hard-line Communist. Although she often claimed that she agreed with her husband on everything, Milošević seems to have had fewer authoritarian tendencies than Marković.

Marković reportedly had little respect for the Bosnian Serb leaders. Vojislav Šešelj appeared before a court on 18 June 1994 to face charges of breaking microphone cables in Parliament. He read a statement, saying, "Mr. Judge, all I can say in my defense is that Milošević is Serbia's biggest criminal." Marković replied by calling Šešelj a "primitive Turk who is afraid to fight like a man, and instead sits around insulting other people's wives." Radovan Karadžić was apparently unable to telephone Milošević because Marković would not tolerate his calls.

Commenting on her husband's arrest to face war crimes charges, Marković stated:

Neither East nor West has betrayed him. The only person that can betray him is me. But people have short memories and you have to remind everyone of everything. In the early 1990s my husband was accused by many circles, in Yugoslavia and abroad, that he had wanted to keep Yugoslavia alive, even though it was falling apart and the Croats and the Slovenes wanted to leave. That was his big sin. Crazy Serbs and Crazy Slobo, they said, they want Yugoslavia. Now, in the Hague, they say he broke up Yugoslavia. Let them make their minds up.

=== Asylum in Russia and death ===
Pursued by legal authorities, Marković settled in Russia in 2003. The authorities of Serbia issued an arrest warrant for her on fraud charges which was circulated via Interpol, but the Russian authorities refused to arrest her.

In March 2012, a collection of her columns for Pravda from 2007 to 2008, as well as for online portal Sloboda from 2010 to 2011, titled Destierrada e imperdida was published in Belgrade by Treći milenijum, a publishing house owned by Hadži Dragan Antić.

After the 2012 elections, a government minister, Milutin Mrkonjić of the Socialist Party (which he co-founded with Milošević) said that Marković and her son were welcome to return. In June 2018, Marković was found guilty in absentia of real estate fraud charges, and sentenced to a year in prison. The Serbian Appeals Court in March 2019 rejected her conviction, finding it unsound, and ordered a new trial.

Marković underwent several surgeries, and died in Moscow on 14 April 2019. The New York Times reported her death was caused by complications due to pneumonia. Her body was cremated and interred in Požarevac alongside her husband on 20 April 2019.

== Books ==
- Night and Day: A Diary - Dragiša Nikolić, December 1995 - 978-8682005223
- Night & Day: A Diary - Quarry Press, May 1997 - 978-1550821680
- Answer - Quarry Press, March 1997 - 978-1550821697

== Sources ==
- LeBor, Adam (2002). Milosevic: A Biography. London: Bloomsbury Publishing plc. ISBN 0-7475-6181-8.
- Djukić, Slavoljub (2001). Milošević and Marković: A Lust for Power. Montreal: McGill-Queen's University Press. ISBN 0-7735-2216-6.
