= Public image of Slobodan Milošević =

The public image of Slobodan Milošević, concerns the image of Slobodan Milošević, the former president of Serbia and later the rump Yugoslavia among the residents of former Yugoslavia and worldwide. Before the Yugoslav Wars the public image of Slobodan Milošević oscillated from an unknown bureaucrat to defender of Serbs. During the Yugoslav Wars his image again oscillated from Balkan Butcher to Guarantor of Peace and back.

== Pre-Yugoslav Wars ==
Initially an unknown bureaucrat, he rose to prominence as Milošević used the Kosovo issue to gain a public image as a defender of Serbs at a mass Serb rally in Kosovo Polje in April 1987.

== Yugoslav Wars ==
=== Croatian War and Bosnian War ===
The attitude of the Western accounts toward Milošević oscillated from Milošević being demonized as the "Butcher of the Balkans" to Milošević being the "guarantor of the peace in the Balkans". Because Milošević and President of Croatia Franjo Tuđman had a key role in reaching the Dayton Agreement which ended the Bosnian War, they were not anymore portrayed as sponsors of the war and its key players, but as the guarantors of peace and stability. In Serbia, the public image of Milošević as internationally recognized statesman was successfully used against his political opponents who were portrayed by government-controlled media as simple politicians in pejorative sense.

=== Kosovo War ===
NATO propaganda demonized Serbs and Milošević, presenting NATO's attack on Yugoslavia as a war between NATO humanitarian forces and satanic Yugoslav forces led by Milošević portrayed as Hitler. Many scholars (like Chandler, Woodward, Burg, Hayden, Shoup, Cohen or Kent) refuted demonization presented in practically all mainstream accounts of the period such as pieces by Tim Judah, Nordland, Roy Gutman or Roger Cohen published in Newsweek, The New York Times and Time. Some authors accused some 'leftist' scholars of whitewashing the guilt of Milošević, referring to their works as conspiracy theories, attributing "enemy of my enemy is my friend" approach to them (because Milošević resisted the USA imperium).

Shortly before NATO bombing of Yugoslavia began, some Western observers argued those very strong accusations against Milošević, whose image was portrayed as being bloody and barbaric. They perceived such strong rhetoric, which even used words as genocide and references to Auschwitz, as demonization of Serbia and Milošević aimed to secure the support of the domestic public for military intervention against Serbia.

Demonization of Serbs and Milošević by media in the United States and European NATO countries was mirrored by Serbian demonization of NATO.

== Trial in The Hague (2000–2006) ==
The trial in ICTY in The Hague significantly contributed to the public image of Slobodan Milošević. The prosecution presented a case portraying him as somebody who was most responsible for the atrocities. Milošević died from heart failure before his trial concluded.

== Sources ==
- Pavlowitch, Stevan K. (2002). Serbia: The History behind the Name. London: Hurst & Company. ISBN 9781850654773.
- Petersen, Roger D. (30 September 2011). Western Intervention in the Balkans: The Strategic Use of Emotion in Conflict. Cambridge University Press. ISBN 978-1-139-50330-3.
- SP (1995). Sociologija. Social psychology.
