= Death of Slobodan Milošević =

2006 death during war crimes trial

- Date: 11 March 2006
- Location: ICTY, The Hague, Netherlands
- Cause: Heart attack
- Outcome: War crime trial unfinished

On 11 March 2006, former Yugoslav president Slobodan Milošević died in his prison cell of a heart attack at age 64 while being tried for war crimes at the International Criminal Tribunal for the Former Yugoslavia (ICTY) in The Hague. Milošević's four-year trial had been a major international news story, and he died a few months before its verdict was due. His death occurred shortly after the Tribunal rejected his request to seek specialized medical treatment at a cardiology clinic in Moscow. A report published on 30 May 2006 confirmed that he had died of natural causes and that there was "no poison or other chemical substance found in his body that contributed to the death".

== Establishment of death ==
Milošević was found dead in his cell on 11 March 2006 in the UN war crimes tribunal's detention centre in the Scheveningen section of The Hague. An official in the chief prosecutor's office said that Milošević had been found at about 10 a.m. and had apparently been dead for several hours. His trial had been due to resume on 14 March with testimony from the former president of Montenegro, Momir Bulatović. A request for the autopsy in the presence of a Serbian pathologist was granted, and his body was transported to the Dutch Forensic Institute.

It was established that Milošević died of a heart attack. Suspicions have been voiced:

1. that he was deliberately given the wrong medication, causing the heart attack (Milošević had claimed to have been given the wrong medication three days before he died).
2. that he took the wrong medication himself in order to worsen his condition or commit suicide. ICTY Chief Prosecutor Carla Del Ponte, suggested Milošević might have committed suicide in order to foul the court and "evade justice"; (the prosecutor, ICTY PR, some Western media, and many U.S. politicians)
3. that he was, deliberately or through negligence, not given the standard treatment that would have prevented the heart attack. (Spanish doctors, Russian doctors, Serbian doctors, Milošević family, academician and philosopher Mihailo Marković)

Milošević had been suffering from heart problems and high blood pressure. Initially, the Dutch coroner failed to establish the cause of his death. Consequently, the president of the ICTY ordered an autopsy and a toxicological investigation. Immediately after his death was announced, rumours that Milošević had been poisoned started circulating.

== Investigation ==
=== 12 March ===
An autopsy was held in the Netherlands; its preliminary results found that Milošević had died of myocardial infarction, the medical term for a heart attack. The Tribunal warned that it was impossible to rule out poisoning at the time of their statement, as the toxicological tests had not been completed. The Tribunal had denied Milošević's request for travel to Russia for specialist medical treatment. He planned to appeal this decision, saying that his condition was worsening. Shortly before his death, Milošević complained about wrong medical treatment to Russian Foreign Minister Sergey Lavrov. The Russian Foreign Ministry confirmed that it received the letter from Milošević with his medical complaints. In the letter as provided by Milošević's lawyer Zdenko Tomanović, Milošević complained that he was being given a drug used against tuberculosis and leprosy, and that it was done in secrecy and without him (Milošević) knowing anything about it. In his hand written letter to Russian Foreign Minister Sergey Lavrov, Milošević said he never used any drugs on his own, nor was he ill and in need of medicine:

[...] I never used any kind of antibiotic during this 5 years that I'm in their prison. Throughout this whole period, neither have I had any kind of infectious illness (apart from Influenza).

Milošević complained, in the same letter, that even though the medical report containing information that the drug used to treat leprosy was found in his blood dated from 12 January, he had only found out and received the report four days earlier. The same was reported later by former pro-Milošević Montenegrin President Momir Bulatović, who was due to testify for Milošević's defence. According to Bulatović, Milošević had stopped taking the drug and consequently was afraid of being poisoned. In his letter, Milošević motivated his desire to be treated in Russia (by "Russian physicians, who rank among the most respected physicians in the world"), saying that:

Also the fact that doctors needed 2 months (to report to me), can't have any other explanation than we are facing manipulation. In any case, those who foist on me a drug against leprosy surely can't treat my illness; likewise those from which I defended my country in times of war and who have an interest to silence me.

Lawyer Zdenko Tomanović told reporters that his client had feared Milošević was being poisoned and cited the aforementioned letter, as well as the medical report two months before his death, according to which Milošević's blood contained rifampicin - a drug that is normally used to treat leprosy and tuberculosis and which would have neutralized some of the effects of Milošević's medicines for his high blood pressure and heart condition. Tomanović said he had made a formal request for the autopsy to take place in Moscow. The Tribunal rejected the request, allowing instead a pathologist from Serbia to attend the autopsy. In his statement, Tomanović said: "I demanded protection for Slobodan Milošević over his claims that he was being poisoned. I still haven't received any reply and that's all I have to say at this time."

=== 13 March ===
Dutch toxicologist Donald Uges confirmed that the drug had been found in Milošević's blood and suggested that he may have deliberately taken these drugs in order to get out of jail and seek medical treatment in Russia, where Milošević's widow, Mirjana Marković, and son, Marko, were still living in exile. Likewise, sources at the Tribunal stated that Milošević had regular access to unprescribed drugs that were smuggled into his cell under a lax prison regime. Timothy McFadden, the prison governor responsible for Milošević, is reported to have complained, in vain, in December and January that he could no longer monitor drugs taken by the former leader. Milošević has the key to his own office, which had a fax machine, a computer and a telephone, and access to a private "comfort room" for visits by his wife.

=== 17 March ===
The Tribunal confirmed that preliminary results of blood tests shows there is no indication that Milošević's death by heart attack was caused by poisoning. Judge Fausto Pocar, president of the UN war crimes tribunal, told a news conference: "So far no indications of poisoning have been found. I would like to stress that these are provisional results." Tribunal registrar Hans Holthuis confirmed that traces of rifampicin were found in an earlier 12 January blood test. However, Pocar said that there are no traces of the drug were found at the time of Milošević's death. According to The Hague, district public prosecutor Moraal, referring to the NFI/Dutch Forensic Institute, "rifampicin disappears from the body quickly, and the fact that no traces were found implies only that it is not likely that rifampicin had been ingested or administered in the last few days before death".

Leo Bokeria, Director of Moscow's Bakulev Heart Surgery Center, confirmed that Milošević had died of a heart attack, but said adequate treatment in Moscow or in any one of many countries, including the Netherlands, would have rescued him. According to Bokeria, the necessary medical procedures (coronary angiography and stenting) were "elementary". Bokeria said he saw "nothing showing signs of suicide", but there remained questions over whether Milošević received adequate care while standing trial at the U.N. tribunal.

If the patient had been investigated enough...he would have still been alive today.

Bokeria also claimed that the center had sent Pocar a letter informing him that Milošević needed hospital treatment and naming several countries beside Russia where that could be done. The Times' medical columnist Thomas Stuttaford commented that, taking into account what had been known about Milošević's health condition for years, he was "surprised that he (Milošević) lived for as long as he did". According to Stuttaford, given the data that existed, Milošević should have been considered for a coronary bypass or angioplasty; while these operations might be rendered impossible by severe heart defects, that can only be established by a careful analysis of the heart, and one would have thought that if this had been done, someone would have mentioned it. According to Stuttaford, using rifampicin might have been a cunning way to kill a man that needs no expertise.

=== 5 April ===
The conclusions of the Dutch investigation into Milošević's death were finally announced. Investigators concluded that Milošević had died of natural causes, and final toxicological studies had confirmed there were no traces of poisoning or substances which could have triggered the heart attack. Tribunal prosecutors also announced that although non-prescribed medicines had been found in Milošević's cell three months earlier, no such medicines were found in his cell on the day he died. The president of the UN Yugoslav war crimes tribunal welcomed the final report that formally closed the Dutch investigation, but he said that the Tribunal will continue to investigate the medical treatment Milošević had received during his five-year detention.

== Political reactions ==
=== ICTY ===
ICTY Chief Prosecutor Carla Del Ponte deplored Milošević's death, saying that it had "deprived victims of justice". Concerning the causes of Milošević's death, she concluded that suicide could not be ruled out and declined to comment on speculation that Milošević may have been poisoned. In an interview with the Rome newspaper, La Repubblica, Del Ponte stated:

I am furious ... In an instant everything was lost ... the death of Milošević represents for me a total defeat.

=== Serbian reactions ===
In Serbia, tens of thousands of Milošević's supporters criticized the Tribunal for allegedly being more or less responsible for his death. Members of his Socialist Party advisors were particularly harsh - for example, senior official Ivica Dačić said that "Milošević did not die in The Hague, he was killed in The Hague". President Boris Tadić, who was an opponent of Milošević and the Socialist Party, said that in his opinion the U.N. war crimes tribunal was responsible for Milošević's death, but he added that it would not hamper Serbia's future cooperation with the court.

== Milošević family reactions ==
Most notable was a letter Marko Milošević, son of Slobodan Milošević, sent to The President of the ICTY, The Chairman of the Security Council of the OUN, The Secretary General of the OUN, and to Judge Parker who led the investigation into Slobodan Milošević's death. In his letter, Marko Milošević accuses the Hague Tribunal for negligence and for the death of his father. In one part of the letter, Milošević agrees that his father was not poisoned and accuses the ICTY for being misleading:

Secondly, neither we the family, nor the expert team of pathologists, which was familiar with my father's health and was given the findings of the Dutch team, ever alleged the possibility of poisoning. To the contrary, I accepted the diagnosis of a heart attack (infarction) from the moment I heard it in The Hague. I warned both your deputy and the Dutch prosecutor not to vulgarize the investigation by setting up a "straw man" accusation such as a violent murder or poisoning. The lines you have chosen to describe the "scene of crime" are naïve, vulgar and insulting. The report itself, if made by an independent institution, would have been at the very least disappointing. But, since it's being issued by the Tribunal, the very institution which had a monopoly over my father's health during his time in UN custody, it is shocking. It contains an unexpected number of contradictions. Its contents and conclusions are absolutely unacceptable to the sane mind.

Marko Milošević then continues about the logic of the investigation into his father's death:

Even if we had suspicions of poisoning, it would be pointless to try and prove them in conditions where the only possible culprit is the investigator. It is as if an accused committed a crime, leads the investigation, and comes to the expected conclusion that he is innocent. An accused may defend himself, but it is quite unusual that the accused himself leads the investigation, as was the case with your investigation and your report.

The Milošević family raised questions about the legitimacy of the ICTY conducted investigation:

Should I mention the fact that the autopsy was conducted without the presence of the independent expert team sent by our family, even though we insisted on it? Or that the Russian doctors were denied the access to the body and the tissue samples? Or that we have been denied his blood samples? Now it happens that the Dutch medical institutions and doctors, which have already been gravely compromised in the eyes of the public through their involvement with the ICTY Prosecution in numerous manipulations with my father's health, medical treatment, and respective diagnosis, were the only ones to manage the toxicology tests and announce their results?! Here I must remind you of my father's letter addressed to the Russian Minister of Foreign Affairs, in which he wrote just hours before his death that he suspected he was being poisoned in the UNDU. So here we have a situation where we are witnessing numerous speculations regarding his blood samples, he expresses his worry about it, then he suddenly dies. Now comes this mysterious autopsy conducted by the very same people that he accused in his last hours, and they conclude that there was no poisoning. How credible does this sound even to you Mr. Parker?

It is a pity that I am not in a position to ask Ms. Del Ponte an even simpler question – if he was ill, then why he wasn't he given medical treatment when he asked for it? And if he wasn't ill, then why did he die?

Marko Milošević then concludes that the ICTY is playing on "straw man" policy:

I understand that the you have set-up this straw-man accusation of poisoning, and now by finding that there was no poisoning you assert that the ICTY has been relieved of all responsibility for my father's death. Nevertheless, an unquestionable truth remains before the public, the image of my father addressing your so-called "trial chamber" and asking to be allowed medical treatment, and the "presiding judge" responding that he will not listen to him.

The question isn't whether or not my father was murdered or poisoned. The point is that a former head of state, being held in UN custody, was gravely ill and constantly complaining of his medical condition. His health condition was assessed many times by medical experts as dire. He was denied adequate (if any) medical treatment, and then he died. At the same time those who denied him treatment were undeniably aware of what the consequences would be. He asked for provisional release to receive medical treatment.

Marko Milošević doubted the intentions of the ICTY:

The Tribunal, and everyone in charge, has committed a deliberate murder. They condemned him to death on February 24th when they rejected his request for provisional release, ignoring everything: his health condition, his rights, and the warnings of his doctors, which unlike the jail physician hired by the ICTY, had both – unquestionable competence and expertise, as well as his confidence. Ignoring even the guarantees of The Russian Federation (by the explanation that those guarantees lacked credibility, it seems that the Tribunal has given itself the mandate to evaluate the credibility of even the Security Council's permanent member states). The ruling handed down on February 24th came into effect on March 11th. That is the fact and the truth. Any other speculation is just evasive political maneuvering.

As (one of the) conclusion(s), Marko Milošević offers:

It is obvious that even without poisoning, murder, or anything similar, but with heart failure which you consider to be a "natural" death that the ICTY and the UN who created it bears the sole responsibility for my father's death.

== Funeral and burial ==
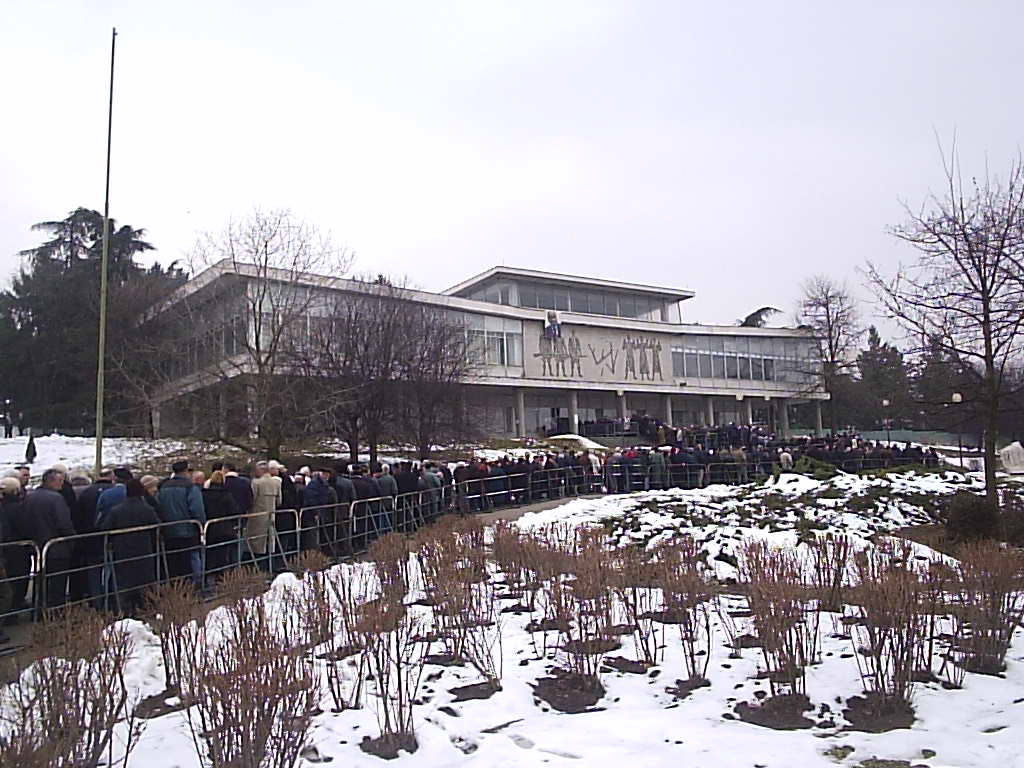
People paying their respects in front of the Museum of Yugoslav History

There was a strong controversy across Serbia regarding Milošević's funeral, as the Socialist Party and nationalist leaders demanded that it should be state-sponsored and high-profile. In particular, it was argued that Milošević ought to have a prominent resting place in the "Alley of the Greats," where other Serbian leaders are buried, which the Tribunal rejected. As a result, the Socialist Party threatened to withdraw its support, which was essential for the ruling coalition. Finally, the Tribunal decided that Milošević should have a private burial in his hometown, Požarevac. Nevertheless, a farewell ceremony was organised by the Socialist Party outside the federal parliament in Belgrade. About 50,000 of Milošević's supporters attended the ceremony, which turned into a mass demonstration, with a succession of fiery speeches by prominent supporters. Afterwards, Milošević's coffin was taken to his hometown for burial in the backyard of his family home. Milošević's family and close friends pulled out of his funeral, citing anonymous threats and contradictory statements from Serbian authorities regarding the requested guarantees that they would not be arrested. Milošević's daughter Marija stated that the Socialist Party had hijacked the funeral for political ends.
