= Slobodan Milošević =

Yugoslav and Serbian politician (1941–2006)

- Слободан Милошевић
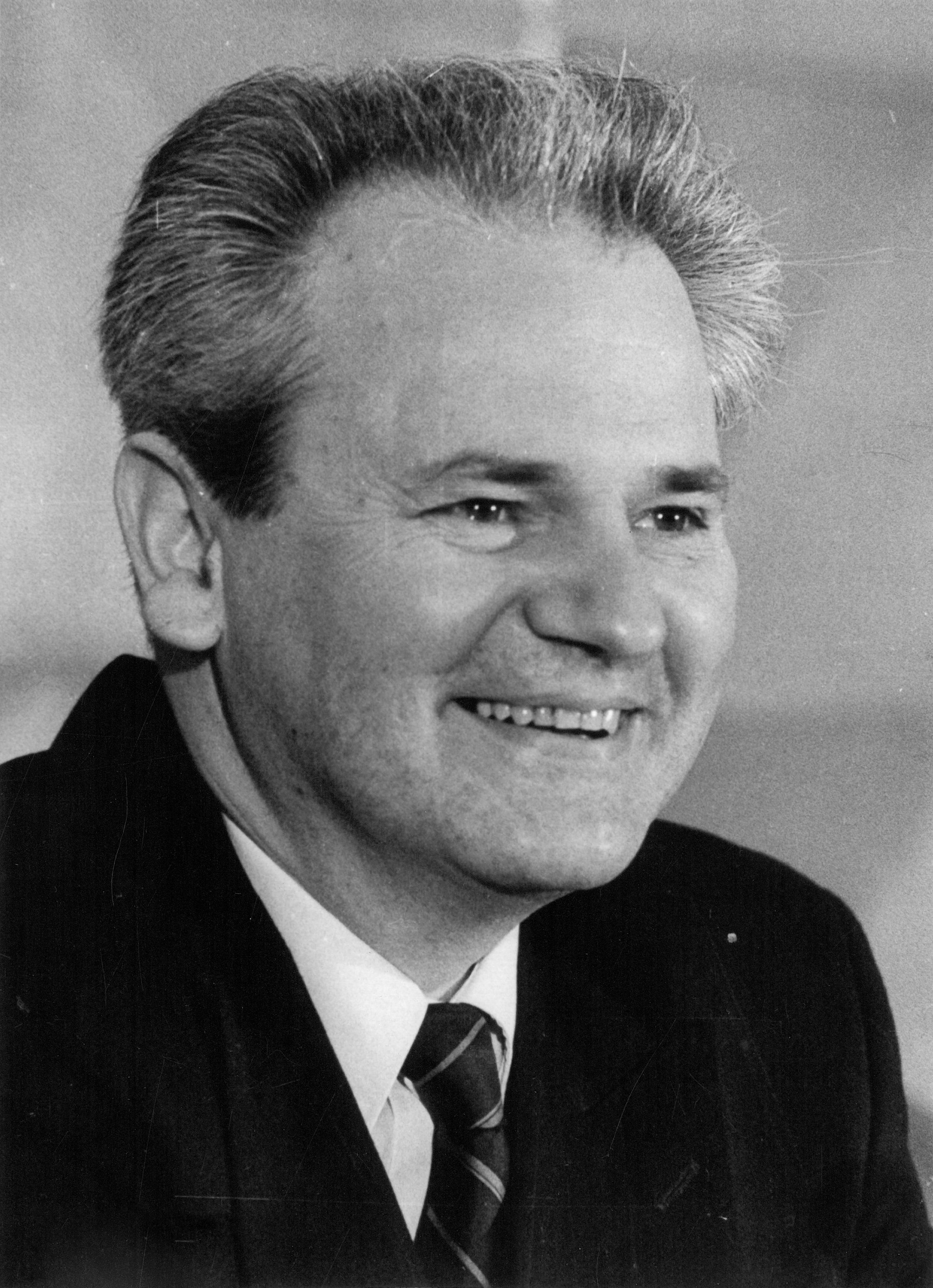
- Milošević in 1988

President of the Federal Republic of Yugoslavia
- In office 23 July 1997 – 7 October 2000
- Prime Minister: Radoje Kontić; Momir Bulatović
- Preceded by: Zoran Lilić
- Succeeded by: Vojislav Koštunica

President of the Republic of Serbia
- In office 11 January 1991 – 23 July 1997
- Prime Minister: Dragutin Zelenović; Radoman Božović; Nikola Šainović; Mirko Marjanović
- Preceded by: Office established; himself as President of the Presidency of the Socialist Republic of Serbia
- Succeeded by: Milan Milutinović

President of the Presidency of the Socialist Republic of Serbia
- In office 8 May 1989 – 11 January 1991
- Prime Minister: Desimir Jevtić; Stanko Radmilović
- Preceded by: Ljubiša Igić (acting)
- Succeeded by: Office abolished; himself as President of Serbia

President of the League of Communists of Serbia
- In office 31 May 1986 – 24 May 1989
- Secretary: Zoran Sokolović
- Preceded by: Ivan Stambolić
- Succeeded by: Bogdan Trifunović

Personal details
- Born: 20 August 1941 Požarevac, German-occupied Serbia
- Died: 11 March 2006 (aged 64) The Hague, Netherlands
- Resting place: Požarevac, Serbia
- Party: SKJ (1959–1990); SPS (from 1990)
- Spouse: Mirjana Marković (m. 1965)
- Children: 2, including Marko
- Relatives: Borislav Milošević (brother); Milisav Koljenšić (uncle); Marko Milošević (grandson)
- Nickname(s): "Sloba"
- Employer: University of Belgrade Faculty of Law
- Criminal charges: War crimes Crimes against humanity Genocide; Abuse of office by incitement
- Criminal status: Died during trial
- Milošević's voice Recorded 9 December 1990 at a rally in Novi Sad
- Milošević became "President of the Presidency" of SR Serbia (a constituent country of SFR Yugoslavia) on 8 May 1989. He was then elected President of Serbia (still part of SFR Yugoslavia) at the first Presidential election in December 1990. After SFR Yugoslavia collapsed in March 1992, he continued as President of the Republic of Serbia as a constituent of the newly formed FR Yugoslavia.

Slobodan Milošević (Serbian Cyrillic: Слободан Милошевић, pronounced [slobǒdan milǒːʃevitɕ], 20 August 1941 – 11 March 2006) was a Yugoslav and Serbian politician who was the president of Serbia between 1989 and 1997 and president of the Federal Republic of Yugoslavia from 1997 until his overthrow in 2000. Milošević played a major role in the Yugoslav Wars and became the first sitting head of state charged with war crimes, as well as the first former head of state charged with crimes against humanity and genocide.

Born in Požarevac, he studied law at the University of Belgrade Faculty of Law where he joined the League of Socialist Youth of Yugoslavia. From the 1960s, he was advisor to the mayor of Belgrade, and in the 1970s he was a chairman of large companies and the protégé of Serbian leader Ivan Stambolić. Milošević was a high-ranking member of the League of Communists of Serbia (SKS) during the 1980s; he came to power in 1987 after he ousted opponents, including Stambolić. He was elected president of the Socialist Republic of Serbia in 1989 and led the anti-bureaucratic revolution, reforming Serbia's constitution and transitioning the state into a multi-party system, reducing the power of autonomous provinces. He led the Socialist Party of Serbia from its foundation in 1990 until his death. Following the 1990 general elections, Milošević enacted dominant-party rule while his party retained control over economic resources of the state. During his presidency, anti-government and anti-war protests took place, and hundreds of thousands deserted the Milošević-controlled Yugoslav People's Army, leading to mass emigration from Serbia.

Observers have described Milošević's political behavior as populist, eclectic, and opportunist. Milošević's rule has been described as authoritarian or autocratic, as a dictatorship, as well as kleptocratic, marked by electoral fraud, assassinations, suppression of press freedom, and police brutality. In terms of ideology, the regime relied on ethnic ultranationalism and populism combining nationalist and socialist rhetoric which served as the vehicles of mass mobilisation in support of the regime against the perceived national enemies like supposedly hostile ethnic groups. This mobilization was channeled in military expansionism against the other successor states of former Yugoslavia and ethnic cleansings during the Yugoslav Wars carried out by armed formations loyal to Milošević. In the course of his rule, Milošević adopted the policies promoted by neo-fascist groups. Overall, some scholars assessed his regime as being similar to fascism in practice.

In May 1999, during the NATO bombing of Yugoslavia, Milošević was charged for war crimes and crimes against humanity connected to the Kosovo War by the International Criminal Tribunal for the former Yugoslavia (ICTY), a body of the United Nations. A second and third indictment followed in 2001 in relation to the Croatian War of Independence and Bosnian War respectively, with the latter including charges of genocide. After resigning from the Yugoslav presidency in 2000 amidst demonstrations against the disputed presidential election, Milošević was arrested by Yugoslav federal authorities in March 2001 on suspicion of corruption, abuse of power, and embezzlement. The initial investigation faltered, and he was extradited to the ICTY to stand trial for war crimes. Milošević denounced the Tribunal as illegal and refused to appoint counsel, conducting his own defence. He died of a heart attack in his cell in The Hague in 2006 before the trial could conclude. The Tribunal denied responsibility for his death stating he had refused to take prescribed medicines for his cardiac ailments, and medicated himself instead. After his death, the ICTY and International Residual Mechanism for Criminal Tribunals found he was a part of a joint criminal enterprise that used violence such as ethnic cleansing to remove Croats, Bosniaks and Albanians from parts of Croatia, Bosnia and Herzegovina, and Kosovo. The International Court of Justice (ICJ) concluded separately there was no evidence linking him to genocide committed by Bosnian Serb forces during the Bosnian War, but found Milošević had violated the Genocide Convention by failing to prevent genocide from occurring and to hold those involved accountable.

== Early life ==
Milošević had ancestral roots from the Lijeva Rijeka village in Podgorica and was of the Vasojevići clan from Montenegro. He was born in Požarevac, four months after the Axis invasion of the Kingdom of Yugoslavia, and raised during the Axis occupation of World War II. He had an older brother Borislav who would later become a diplomat. His parents separated in the aftermath of the war. His father, the Serbian Orthodox theologian Svetozar Milošević, died by suicide in 1962. Svetozar's father Simeun was an officer in the Montenegrin Army. Milošević's mother Stanislava (née Koljenšić), a school teacher and also an active member of the Communist Party, died by suicide in 1972. Her brother (Milošević's maternal uncle) Milisav Koljenšić was a major-general in the Yugoslav People's Army who died by suicide in 1963.

Milošević went on to study law at the University of Belgrade Law School, where he became the head of the ideology committee of the Yugoslav Communist League's (SKJ) League of Socialist Youth of Yugoslavia (SSOJ). While at the university, he befriended Ivan Stambolić, whose uncle Petar Stambolić had been a president of the Serbian Executive Council (the Communist equivalent of a prime minister). This was to prove a crucial connection for Milošević's career prospects, as the two climbed through the SKJ hierarchy.

After his graduation in 1964, Milošević became an economic advisor to the mayor of Belgrade Branko Pešić. In 1965, he married his childhood friend Mirjana Marković with whom he had two children: Marko and Marija. Marković would have some influence on Milošević's political career both before and after his rise to power; she was also leader of her husband's junior coalition partner, Yugoslav Left (JUL) in the 1990s. In 1968, Milošević got a job at the Tehnogas company, where Stambolić was working, and became its chairman in 1973. By 1978, Stambolić's sponsorship had enabled Milošević to become the head of Beobanka, one of Yugoslavia's largest banks; this allowed him frequent trips to Paris and New York.

== Rise to power ==
On 16 April 1984, Milošević was elected president of the Belgrade League of Communists City Committee. On 21 February 1986, the Socialist Alliance of Working People unanimously supported him as presidential candidate for the SKJ's Serbian branch Central Committee. Milošević was elected by a majority vote at the 10th Congress of the Serbian League of Communists on 28 May 1986.

Milošević emerged in 1987 as a force in Serbian politics after he declared support for Serbs in the Serbian Socialist Autonomous Province of Kosovo, who claimed they were being oppressed by the provincial government which was dominated by Kosovo's majority ethnic group, ethnic Albanians. Milošević claimed that ethnic Albanian authorities had abused their powers, that the autonomy of Kosovo was allowing the entrenchment of separatism in Kosovo, and that the rights of the Serbs in the province were being regularly violated. As a solution, he called for political change to reduce the autonomy, protect minority Serb rights, and initiate a strong crackdown on separatism in Kosovo.

Milošević was criticized by opponents, who claimed he and his allies were attempting to strengthen the position of Serbs in Yugoslavia at the expense of Kosovo Albanians and other nationalities, a policy they characterized as being nationalist, which was a taboo in the Yugoslav Communist system and effectively a political crime, as nationalism was identified as a violation of the Yugoslav Communists' commitment to Brotherhood and Unity. Milošević always denied allegations that he was a nationalist or that he exploited Serbian nationalism in his rise to power. In a 1995 interview with TIME, he defended himself from these accusations by claiming he stood for every nationality in Yugoslavia: "All my speeches up to '89 were published in my book. You can see that there was no nationalism in those speeches. We were explaining why we think it is good to preserve Yugoslavia for all Serbs, all Croats, all Muslims and all Slovenians as our joint country. Nothing else." Nevertheless, Milošević was described as a left-wing nationalist.

As animosity between Serbs and Albanians in Kosovo deepened during the 1980s, Milošević was sent to address a crowd of Serbs at the historic Kosovo field on 24 April 1987. While Milošević was talking to the leadership inside the local cultural hall, demonstrators outside clashed with the local Kosovo-Albanian police force. The New York Times reported that "a crowd of 15,000 Serbs and Montenegrins hurled stones at the police after they used truncheons to push people away from the entrance to the cultural center of Kosovo Polje."

Milošević heard the commotion and was sent outside to calm the situation. A videotape of the event shows Milošević responding to complaints from the crowd that the police were beating people by saying "No one is allowed to beat you." Later that evening, Serbian television aired the video of Milošević's encounter.

The Federal Secretariat of the SFRY Interior Ministry, however, condemned the police's use of rubber truncheons as not in keeping within the provisions of Articles 100 and 101 of the rules of procedure for "conducting the work of law enforcement"; they had found that "the total conduct of the citizenry in the mass rally before the cultural hall in Kosovo Polje cannot be assessed as negative or extremist. There was no significant violation of law and order."

Although Milošević was only addressing a small group of people around him – not the public, a great deal of significance has been attached to that remark. Stambolić, after his reign as president, said that he had seen that day as "the end of Yugoslavia".

Dragiša Pavlović, a Stambolić ally and Milošević's successor at the head of the Belgrade Committee of the party, was expelled from the party during the 8th Session of the League of Communists of Serbia after he publicly criticized the party's Kosovo policy. The central committee voted overwhelmingly for his dismissal: 106 members voted for his expulsion, eight voted against, and 18 abstained. Stambolić was fired after Communist officials in Belgrade accused him of abusing his office during the Pavlović affair. Stambolić was accused of sending a secret letter to the party Presidium, in what was seen as an attempt to misuse the weight of his position as Serbian president, to prevent the central committee's vote on Pavlović's expulsion from the party.

In 2002, Adam LeBor and Louis Sell wrote that Pavlović was really dismissed because he opposed Milošević's policies towards Kosovo-Serbs. They contend that, contrary to advice from Stambolić, Milošević had denounced Pavlović as being soft on Albanian radicals. LeBor and Sell assert that Milošević prepared the ground for his ascent to power by quietly replacing Stambolić's supporters with his own people, thereby forcing Pavlović and Stambolić from power.

In February 1988, Stambolić's resignation was formalized, allowing Milošević to take his place as Serbia's president. Milošević then initiated a program of IMF-supported free-market reforms, setting up in May 1988 the "Milošević Commission" comprising Belgrade's leading neoliberal economists.

=== Anti-bureaucratic revolution ===
Starting in 1988, the anti-bureaucratic revolution led to the resignation of the governments of Vojvodina and Montenegro and to the election of officials allied with Milošević. According to the ICTY indictment against Milošević: "From July 1988 to March 1989, a series of demonstrations and rallies supportive of Milošević's policies – the 'Anti-Bureaucratic Revolution' – took place in Vojvodina and Montenegro. These protests led to the ousting of the respective provincial and republican governments; the new governments were then supportive of, and indebted to, Slobodan Milošević."

Milošević's supporters say the anti-bureaucratic revolution was an authentic grass-roots political movement. Reacting to the indictment, Dr. Branko Kostić, Montenegro's then-representative on the Presidency of Yugoslavia said, "Well, it sounds like nonsense to me. If a government or a leadership were supportive of Milošević, then it would be normal for him to feel indebted to them, not the other way around." He said Milošević enjoyed genuine grassroots support because "his name at that time shone brightly on the political arena of the entire federal Yugoslavia ... and many people saw him as a person who would be finally able to make things move, to get things going." Kosta Bulatović, an organizer of the anti-bureaucratic rallies, said "All of this was spontaneous"; the motivation to protest was "coming from the grassroots."

Milošević's critics claim that he cynically planned and organized the anti-bureaucratic revolution to strengthen his political power. Stjepan Mesić, who served as the last president of a united Yugoslavia (in the prelude of these events), said that Milošević, "with the policy he waged, broke down the autonomous [government in] Vojvodina, which was legally elected, [and] in Montenegro he implemented an anti-bureaucratic revolution, as it's called, by which he destroyed Yugoslavia." Commenting on Milošević's role, Slovene president Milan Kučan said, "none of us believed in Slovenia that these were spontaneous meetings and rallies." He accused the Serbian government of deliberately fanning nationalist passions, and Slovene newspapers published articles comparing Milošević to Italian Fascist dictator Benito Mussolini, a one-time socialist who turned to nationalism. Milošević contended that such criticism was unfounded and amounted to "spreading fear of Serbia".

In Vojvodina, where 54 percent of the population was Serb, an estimated 100,000 demonstrators rallied outside the Communist Party headquarters in Novi Sad on 6 October 1988 to demand the resignation of the provincial leadership. The majority of protesters were workers from the town of Bačka Palanka, 40 kilometres west of Novi Sad. They were supportive of Milošević and opposed the provincial government's moves to block forthcoming amendments to the Serbian constitution. The New York Times reported that the demonstrations were held "with the support of Slobodan Milošević" and that "Diplomats and Yugoslavs speculated about whether Mr. Milošević, whose hold over crowds [was] great, had had a hand in organizing the Novi Sad demonstrations." The demonstrations were successful. The provincial leadership resigned, and the League of Communists of Vojvodina elected a new leadership. In the elections that followed, Dr. Dragutin Zelenović, a Milošević ally, was elected member of the SFRY Presidency from Vojvodina.

On 10 January 1989, the anti-bureaucratic revolution continued in Montenegro, which had the lowest average monthly wage in Yugoslavia, an unemployment rate of nearly 25 percent, and where one-fifth of the population lived below the poverty line. 50,000 demonstrators gathered in the Montenegrin capital of Titograd (now Podgorica) to protest the republic's economic situation and to demand the resignation of its leadership.

The next day, Montenegro's state presidency tendered its collective resignation along with the Montenegrin delegates in the Yugoslav Politburo. Montenegro's representative on the federal presidency, Veselin Đuranović, said the decision to step down "was motivated by a sense of responsibility for the economic situation."

Demonstrators were seen carrying portraits of Milošević and shouting his name, but The New York Times reported "there is no evidence that the Serbian leader played an organizing role" in the demonstrations.

Multiparty elections were held in Montenegro for the first time after the anti-bureaucratic revolution. Nenad Bućin, an opponent of Milošević's policies, was elected Montenegro's representative on Yugoslavia's collective presidency, and Momir Bulatović, a Milošević ally, was elected President of Montenegro.

=== Constitutional amendments ===
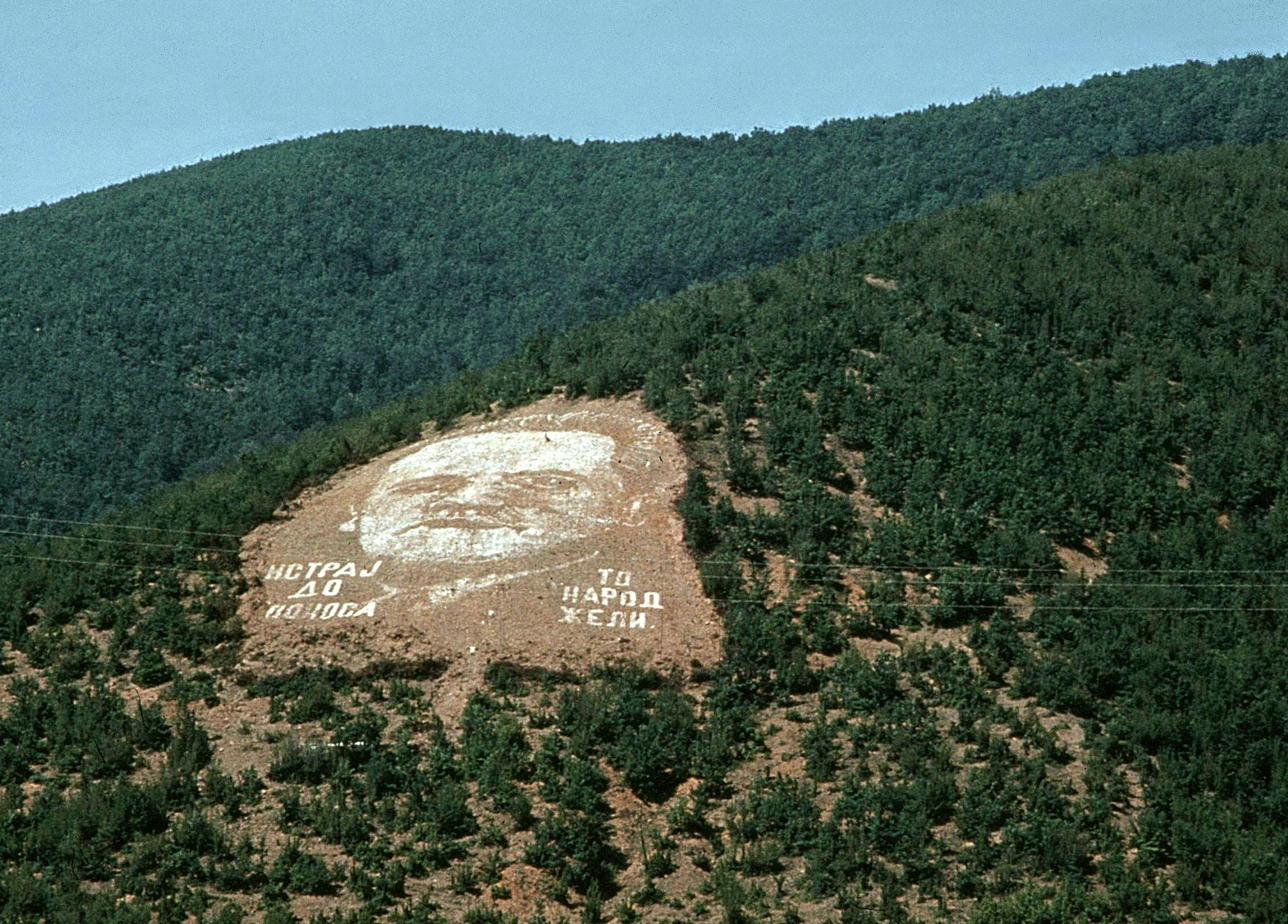
Milošević depicted on a mountainous terrain in August 1989 with the words "Persist to pride, that's the people's wish."

Beginning in 1982 and 1983, in response to nationalist Albanian riots in Kosovo, the Central Committee of the League of Communists of Yugoslavia adopted a set of conclusions aimed at centralizing Serbia's control over law enforcement and the judiciary in its Kosovo and Vojvodina provinces.

In the early to mid-1980s, claims were made of a mass exodus of Serbs and Montenegrins from Kosovo as a result of Albanian riots. Serbian nationalists denounced the 1974 Yugoslav constitution and demands for change were strong among Kosovo Serbs. In 1986, Serbian President Ivan Stambolić responded by accepting this position, declaring that the 1974 constitution was contrary to the interests of Serbs, though he warned that "certain individuals" were "coquetting" with Serbian nationalism. Stambolić established a commission to amend the Serbian constitution in keeping with conclusions adopted by the federal Communist Party.

The constitutional commission worked for three years to harmonize its positions and in 1989 an amended Serbian constitution was submitted to the governments of Kosovo, Vojvodina and Serbia for approval. On 10 March 1989, the Vojvodina Assembly approved the amendments, followed by the Kosovo Assembly on 23 March, and the Serbian Assembly on 28 March.

In the Kosovo Assembly 187 of the 190 assembly members were present when the vote was taken: 10 voted against the amendments, two abstained, and the remaining 175 voted in favor of the amendments. Although the ethnic composition of the Kosovo Assembly was over 70 percent Albanian, they were forced to vote in favor of the amendments while under the careful watch of the newly arrived Serbian police forces. Unrest began when amendments were approved restoring Serbian control over the province's police, courts, national defence and foreign affairs. According to a United Press International report, rioting killed 29 people and injured 30 policemen and 97 civilians.

In the wake of the unrest following the 1989 constitutional amendments, ethnic Albanians in Kosovo largely boycotted the provincial government and refused to vote in the elections. Azem Vllasi, leader of the League of Communists of Kosovo, was arrested for inciting rioting amid the 1989 strike by Kosovo-Albanian miners. In the wake of the Albanian boycott, supporters of Milošević were elected to positions of authority by the remaining Serbian voters in Kosovo. The boycott soon included education in the Albanian language in Kosovo which Milošević attempted to resolve by signing the Milošević-Rugova education agreement in 1996.

The anti-bureaucratic revolutions in Montenegro and Vojvodina coupled with Kosovo effectively meant that Milošević and his supporters held power in four out of the eight republics and autonomous provinces that made up the Yugoslav federation. Whether this was cynically engineered by Milošević is a matter of controversy between his critics and his supporters.

Because Milošević's supporters controlled half of the votes in the SFRY presidency, his critics charge that he undermined the Yugoslav federation. This, his detractors argue, upset the balance of power in Yugoslavia and provoked separatism elsewhere in the federation. Milošević's supporters contend that the representatives of the SFRY presidency were elected according to the law. They say that Milošević enjoyed genuine popular support, so it was perfectly logical for his allies to be elected to the presidency. His supporters dismiss allegations that he upset the balance of power in Yugoslavia as a propaganda ploy designed to justify separatism.

In 1990, after other republics abandoned the League of Communists of Yugoslavia and adopted democratic multiparty systems, Milošević's government quickly followed suit and the 1990 Serbian Constitution was created. The 1990 Constitution officially renamed the Socialist Republic of Serbia to the Republic of Serbia and abandoned the one-party communist system and created a democratic multiparty system.

After the creation of a multiparty system in Serbia, Milošević and his political allies in Serbia and elsewhere in Yugoslavia pushed for the creation of a democratic multiparty system of government at the federal level, such as Serbian state media appealing to the citizens of Bosnia and Herzegovina in early 1992 with the promise that Bosnia and Herzegovina could peacefully coexist in a democratic Yugoslav federation alongside the republics of Serbia and Montenegro. In the aftermath, Serbia and Montenegro agreed to create the new Yugoslav federation called the Federal Republic of Yugoslavia in 1992, which dismantled the remaining communist infrastructure and created a federal democratic multiparty system of government.

=== Economic policies ===
Milošević advocated a synthesis of socialist and liberal economic policies that would gradually transition Serbia from a planned economy to a mixed economy. During the first democratic election in Serbia, Milošević promised to protect industrial workers from the adverse effects of free market policies by maintaining social ownership of the economy and supporting trade barriers in order to protect local industries. Despite this, many accused Milošević of creating a kleptocracy by transferring much of the ownership of the industrial and financial sector to his political allies and financiers. Under heavy economic sanctions from the United Nations due to Milošević's perceived role in the Yugoslav wars, Serbia's economy began a prolonged period of economic collapse and isolation. The war-related easy money policies of the National Bank of Yugoslavia in Serbia and Montenegro contributed to hyperinflation which reached an alarming rate of 313 million percent in January 1994. According to the World Bank, Serbia's economy contracted by 27.2 and 30.5 percent in 1992 and 1993 respectively. In response to the deteriorating situation, World Bank economist Dragoslav Avramović was nominated the governor of the National Bank of the FR Yugoslavia in March 1994. Avramović began monetary reforms that ended hyperinflation and returned the Serbian economy to economic growth by giving the Yugoslav dinar in Serbia and Montenegro a 1:1 parity with the Deutsche Mark. Milošević's role in the signing of the Dayton Accords allowed the lifting of most economic sanctions, but the FR Yugoslavia was still not allowed access to financial and foreign aid due to the perceived oppression of Albanians in Kosovo. The Serbian economy began growing from the period of 1994–1998, at one point even reaching a growth rate of 10.1 percent in 1997. However, this growth rate was insufficient to return Serbia to its pre-war economic status. In order to pay out pensions and wages, Milošević's socialist government had no choice but to begin selling off Serbia's most profitable telecommunications, which gave the federal government about $1.05 billion more in revenue. In 1998, Milošević promised to introduce a new economic program which would begin a process of market reforms, reduction of trade barriers, and the privatization of more state owned enterprises in order to achieve an economic growth rate of 10%. However, this plan was never implemented due to the Kosovo war, the NATO bombing of Yugoslavia, and his subsequent overthrow in October 2000.

=== Civil and political rights under Milošević ===
Milošević's government policies on civil and political rights when serving as Serbian President and later Yugoslav president were controversial.

Milošević's government exercised influence and censorship in the media. An example was in March 1991, when Serbia's Public Prosecutor ordered a 36-hour blackout of two independent media stations, B92 Radio and Studio B television to prevent the broadcast of a demonstration against the Serbian government taking place in Belgrade. The two media stations appealed to the Public Prosecutor against the ban but the Public Prosecutor failed to respond.

Upon the creation of the Federal Republic of Yugoslavia, Milošević's government engaged in reforms to the Serbian penal code regarding restrictions on free speech, which were seen by critics as highly authoritarian. In particular Article 98 of the Serbian penal code during the 1990s mandated imprisonment of up to three years for the following:

...public ridicule [of] the Republic of Serbia or another Republic within the Federal Republic of Yugoslavia, their flag, coat of arms or anthem, their presidencies, assemblies or executive councils, the president of the executive council in connection with the performance of their office..."

The federal criminal code for Yugoslavia also protected the presidents of federal institutions, the Yugoslav Army and federal emblems. Both the Serbian and federal Yugoslav laws granted limited exemptions to journalists. The result was multiple charges against a variety of people opposed to the policies of the Serbian and Yugoslav governments even including a Serbian cartoonist who designed political satire.

== Rule and role in the Yugoslav Wars ==
The Hague indictment alleges that, starting in 1987, Milošević "endorsed a Serbian nationalist agenda" and "exploited a growing wave of Serbian nationalism in order to strengthen centralised rule in the SFRY." ICTY prosecutors argued that "the (Croatia, Bosnia, and Kosovo) indictments were all part of a common scheme, strategy or plan on the part of the accused Milošević to create a Greater Serbia, a centralized Serbian state encompassing the Serb-populated areas of Croatia and Bosnia and all of Kosovo, and that this plan was to be achieved by forcibly removing non-Serbs from large geographical areas through the commission of the crimes charged in the indictments. Although the events in Kosovo were separated from those in Croatia and Bosnia by more than three years, they were no more than a continuation of that plan, and they could only be understood completely by reference to what had happened in Croatia and Bosnia." Milošević's defenders claim that the Prosecution could not produce a single order issued by his government to Serbian fighters in Croatia or Bosnia. Near the end of the Prosecution's case, a Prosecution analyst admitted under cross-examination that this was indeed the case. Reynaud Theunens, however, was quick to point out, "the fact that we don't have orders doesn't mean that they don't exist" to which Milošević replied "There are none, that's why you haven't got one."

Milošević's political behavior has been analyzed as politically opportunist in nature. Claims that Milošević was principally motivated by a desire for power have been supported by many people who knew or worked for him. Some believe his original goal until the breakup of Yugoslavia was to take control of Yugoslavia, with the ambition of becoming its next great leader, a "second Tito". According to this, Milošević exploited nationalism as a tool to seize power in Serbia, while not holding any particular commitment to it. During the first twenty-five years of his political career in the communist government of Yugoslavia, Milošević was a typical civil servant who did not appear to have nationalist aims. Later, he attempted to present himself as a peacemaker in the Yugoslav Wars and abandoned support of nationalism. He returned to support nationalism during the Kosovo War and appealed to anti-imperialist sentiments. The spread of violent nationalism has also been imputed to indifference to it by Milošević.

The source of Milošević's nationalistic agenda is believed to have been influenced by the policies of the popular prominent Serbian Communist official and former Yugoslav Partisan Aleksandar Ranković who was known to promote Serbian national interests in Yugoslavia and tougher police actions against ethnic Albanians in Kosovo. He supported a centralized Yugoslavia and opposed efforts that promoted decentralization that he deemed to be against the interests of Serb unity. Ranković imposed harsh repressive measures on Kosovo Albanians based on accusations that they were sympathizers of the Stalinist rule of Enver Hoxha in Albania. In 1956, a show trial in Pristina was held in which multiple Albanian Communists of Kosovo were convicted of being infiltrators from Albania and were given long prison sentences. Ranković sought to secure the position of the Serbs in Kosovo and gave them dominance in Kosovo's nomenklatura. Under Ranković's influence, Islam in Kosovo at this time was repressed and both Albanians and ethnically Slavic Muslims were encouraged to declare themselves to be Turkish and emigrate to Turkey. At the same time, Serbs and Montenegrins dominated the government, security forces, and industrial employment in Kosovo. The popularity of Ranković's nationalistic policies in Serbia became apparent during his funeral in Serbia in 1983 where large numbers of people attended while considering Ranković a Serbian "national" leader. This event is believed to have possibly influenced Milošević, who attended Ranković's funeral, to recognize the popularity of Ranković's agenda. This connection to the legacy of Ranković was recognized by a number of Yugoslavs who regarded Milošević's policies upon his rise to power in Serbia as effectively "bringing Ranković back in".

During the Anti-bureaucratic revolution, Milošević urged Serbians and Montenegrins to "take to the streets" and utilized the slogan "Strong Serbia, Strong Yugoslavia" that drew support from Serbs and Montenegrins but alienated the other Yugoslav nations. To these groups, Milošević's agenda reminded them of the Serb hegemonic political affairs of the Kingdom of Yugoslavia and Ranković's policies. Milošević appealed to nationalist and populist passion by speaking of Serbia's importance to the world and in a Belgrade speech on 19 November 1988, he spoke of Serbia as facing battles against both internal and external enemies. In Vojvodina, a mob of pro-Milošević demonstrators that included 500 Kosovo Serbs and local Serbs demonstrated at the provincial capital, accusing the leadership in Vojvodina of supporting separatism and of being "traitors". In August 1988, meetings by supporters of the Anti-bureaucratic revolution were held in many locations in Serbia and Montenegro, with an increasingly violent nature, with calls being heard such as "Give us arms!", "We want weapons!", "Long live Serbia—death to Albanians!", and "Montenegro is Serbia!" In the same month, Milošević began efforts designed to destabilize the governments in Montenegro and Bosnia and Herzegovina to allow him to install his followers in those republics. By 1989, Milošević and his supporters controlled Central Serbia along with the autonomous provinces of Kosovo and Vojvodina, supporters in the leadership of Montenegro, and agents of the Serbian security service were pursuing efforts to destabilize the government in Bosnia and Herzegovina. The new government of Montenegro led by Momir Bulatović was seen by some as a satellite of Serbia. In 1989, the Serbian media began to speak of "the alleged imperilment of the Serbs of Bosnia and Herzegovina", as tensions between Serbs, Bosniaks and Croats increased over Serb support for Milošević. Efforts to spread the cult of personality of Milošević into the Socialist Republic of Macedonia began in 1989 with the introduction of slogans, graffiti, and songs glorifying Milošević. Furthermore, Milošević proposed a law to restore land titles held by Serbs in the interwar period that effectively provided a legal basis for large numbers of Serbs to move to Kosovo and Macedonia to regain those lands. Beginning in 1989, Milošević gave support to Croatian Serbs who were vouching for the creation of an autonomous province for Croatian Serbs, which was opposed by Croatian communist authorities. In the late 1980s, Milošević allowed the mobilization of Serb nationalist organizations to go unhindered by actions from the Serbian government, with Chetniks holding demonstrations, and the Serbian government embracing the Serbian Orthodox Church restored its legitimacy in Serbia.

Croatia and Slovenia denounced Milošević's actions and began to demand that Yugoslavia be made a full multi-party confederal state. Milošević claimed that he opposed a confederal system but also declared that a confederal system be created, with the external borders of Serbia being an "open question". Tensions between the republics escalated to crisis beginning in 1988, with Slovenia accusing Serbia of pursuing Stalinism while Serbia accused Slovenia of betrayal. Serbs boycotted Slovene products and Belgraders began removing their savings from the Slovenian Ljubljanska banka. Slovenia accused Serbia of persecuting Kosovo Albanians and declared its solidarity with the Kosovo Albanian people while Milošević in turn, accused Slovenia of being a "lackey" of Western Europe. In response to the escalating tensions, Croatia expressed support for Slovenia, Bosnia and Herzegovina declared its neutrality, while Montenegro supported Serbia. Slovenia reformed its constitution in 1989 that declared Slovenia's right to secession. These changes provoked accusations by the Serbian media that the changes were "destabilizing". Serbia's response was a plan to hold demonstrations in Ljubljana with 30,000 to 40,000 Serbs to supposedly inform Slovenes about the situation in Kosovo, while this was suspected to be an action aimed at destabilizing the Slovene government. Croatia and Slovenia prevented the Serb protesters from crossing by train into Slovenia. Serbia responded by breaking political links between the two republics and 329 Serbian businesses broke ties with Slovenia. With these events in 1989, nationalism soared in response along with acts of intolerance, discrimination, and ethnic violence increasing. In that year, officials from Bosnia and Herzegovina noted rising tensions between Bosniaks, Croats, and Serbs; active rumors spread of incidents between Croats and Serbs and arguments by Croats and Serbs that Bosniaks were not a real nation escalated.

With the collapse of the League of Communists of Yugoslavia, multiparty elections were held in Serbia in 1990, with a number of nationalist parties running on the agenda of creating a Greater Serbia as Yugoslavia fell apart. From 1990 onward, as Serbs in Croatia pushed for autonomy and began to arm themselves, the Serbian state-run newspaper Politika denounced the Croatian government of Franjo Tuđman for allegedly "trying to restore the World War II-era Ustaše regime" and for "copying Tito", and pledged that Belgrade would support the Serbs of Croatia. The Yugoslav People's Army (JNA) began providing weapons to the Serbs in Croatia while the situation in Belgrade grew more intense as Serbs demonstrated outside of the parliament, shouting "We want arms" and "Let's go to Croatia!".

Milošević and other members of the Serbian leadership in the 1980s attempted to gain support among Serb nationalists by appealing to revisionism of the history of Yugoslavia in World War II. To do this, the Tito-era tradition of focusing on rallying the population of Yugoslavia in remembering the total casualties of Yugoslavs in World War II at the hands of Axis forces was replaced with the Milošević government's focus on remembering the Serb casualties of World War II as victims of the Croatian Ustaše. This attempt to gain nationalist support also had the effect of increasing the radicalization of Serbian nationalism. In the late 1980s, conspiracy theories that vilified the Roman Catholic Church began to become widespread and were supported by Serbian publishers. This was of particular significance since these were attacks on the national religion of the Croats. The political climate in Serbia and Serb territories fostered the rise of ultranationalism and created tense and, at times, violent confrontations between Serbs themselves, particularly between nationalist Serbs and non-nationalist Serbs. Serbs who publicly opposed the nationalist agenda were reported to have been harassed, threatened, or killed.

Serbian ultranationalism was used as the main component of Milošević's ideological base. His regime fostered it by promoting the ultranationalist parties and paramilitary formations which were loyal to him and engaged in armed conflict in Serbia's neighbours in former Yugoslavia, Croatia and Bosnia and Herzegovina, and by spreading the fear of Serbia's neighbours and non-Serbian ethnic groups of Yugoslavia in media. Propaganda relied on an image of a conspiracy of global powers united against Serbia. Meanwhile, Milošević posed himself as the main public defender of the ultranationalist groups. The regime was an authoritarian-bureaucratic system which combined socialist phraseology with etno-populism for mass mobilization of its supporters against "national enemies", "any ethnic group" seemingly "opposing Serbian interests". Such political behaviour and functioning led to some scholars drawing parallels between the Milošević regime and fascism. Robert Paxton called the regime "a functional equivalent" of fascism, "a de facto dictatorship with fervent mass support engaged in the killing of men, women, and children in order to avenge alleged historic national humiliations and to create an ethnically pure and expanded nation-state". Marko Attila Hoare (The Oxford Handbook of Fascism) called it "fascist in practice, if not in self-identification", noted the similarity of Milošević's path as a socialist who adopted nationalism to that of Mussolini, and described it as a regime which needed to constantly keep itself in conflicts or crises to support the mass mobilisation it relied on. Stanley G. Payne wrote that the Milošević regime "acquired aspects of fascist style in its mass atrocities and 'ethnic cleansing'", but wrote that in contrast to historical fascist regimes, Serbia was not a one-party state. Encyclopædia Britannica notes that Milošević "gradually adopted" the policies of Serbian neo-fascist groups, such as the Serbian Radical Party (SRS) allied with Milošević in a coalition, to stay in power, including the "Greater Serbia" expansionism. The SRS under Milošević enjoyed the role of the second party in the parliament, while its leader Vojislav Šešelj became the official "opposition" leader publicly approved by Milošević himself, although later the SRS faced persecution for challenging Milošević in an attempt to compete for power. After a reconciliation, Milošević appointed Šešelj his Deputy Prime Minister.

The Serbian media during Milošević's era was known to espouse Serb nationalism and patriotism, while promoting xenophobia toward the other ethnicities in Yugoslavia. Ethnic Albanians were commonly characterised in the media as anti-Yugoslav counter-revolutionaries, rapists, and a threat to the Serb nation. Politika had a number of xenophobic headlines such as in 1991, saying "The Šiptars [Albanians] are watching and waiting". The newspaper also attacked Croats for the election of Franjo Tuđman as president, saying that the "Croatian leadership again shames the Croatian people". It attempted to assert that Croats and ethnic Albanians were cooperating in a campaign against the Serbian government during the 1991 protests in Belgrade against Milošević's government, denying that Serbs took part in the protest while claiming "it was the Šiptars and Croats who demonstrated". When war erupted in Croatia, Politika promoted Serb nationalism, hostility towards Croatia, and violence, and on 2 April 1991, the newspaper's headline read "Krajina decides to join Serbia". One of the newspaper's stories was "Serbian unity—saving Krajina". On 5 June 1991, Politika ekspres ran a piece titled "Serbs must get weapons". On 25 June 1991 and 3 July 1991, Politika began to openly promote partitioning Croatia, saying "We can't accept Croatia keeping these borders", "Krajina in the same state with Serbia, Montenegro, and Bosnia-Herzegovina", and prominently quoted Jovan Marjanović of the Serbian Renewal Movement, who said "The [Yugoslav] Army must come into Croatia and occupy the line Benkovac-Karlovac-Pakrac-Baranja", which would essentially have occupied almost all of Croatia and all the territories in Croatia that were claimed by nationalist promoters of a Greater Serbia. To promote fear and anger among Serbs towards Croatia, on 25 June 1991, Politika reminded Serbs about the atrocities by the Croatian fascist Ustaše against Serbs during World War II by saying "Jasenovac [an Ustase concentration camp in World War II] mustn't be forgotten". According to Borisav Jović, who was formerly a close Milošević ally, Milošević exercised media censorship and maintained strong personal influence over Serbia's state media outlets, having "personally appointed editors-in-chief of newspapers and news programs ..." Serbian state media during the wars featured controversial reportage that villainized the other ethnic factions. In one such program, a Croatian Serb woman denounced the old "communist policy" in Croatia, claiming that under it "[t]he majority of Serbs would be assimilated in ten years", while another interviewee stated "Where Serbian blood was shed by Ustaša knives, there will be our boundaries." Various Serbian state television reports featured a guest speaker, Jovan Rašković, who claimed that the Croat people had a "genocidal nature". These repeatedly negative media depictions of the opposing ethnic factions have been said to have been examples of Milošević's state media promoting fear-mongering and utilizing xenophobic nationalist sentiments to draw Serbs to support the wars. The director of Radio Television of Serbia during Milošević's era, Dušan Mitević, has since admitted on a PBS documentary "the things that happened at state TV, warmongering, things we can admit to now: false information, biased reporting. That went directly from Milošević to the head of TV.

Milošević was uninterested in maintaining Slovenia within the Yugoslav federation, as Slovenia had very few Serbs living within it and Milošević suggested a political deal with Slovene president Milan Kučan; Serbia would recognize the right of the self-determination of the Slovene nation to independence if Slovenia in turn recognized the right of self-determination of the Serb nation to remain united with Serbia. Such a deal would have set a precedent for Serbs in Bosnia and Croatia to remain in one state with Serbia. Milošević's ally in the Yugoslav federal government, Borisav Jović, stated "I put it bluntly. We didn't want a war with Slovenia. Serbia had no territorial claims there. It was an ethnically pure republic – no Serbs. We couldn't care less if they left Yugoslavia ... We would have been overstretched. With Slovenia out of the way, we could dictate terms to the Croats."

Milošević rejected the independence of Croatia in 1991, and even after the formation of the Federal Republic of Yugoslavia (FRY), it too did not initially recognize Croatia's independence. Plans by Milošević to carve out territory from Croatia to the local Serbs had begun by June 1990, according to the diary of Borisav Jović. The Serbian government along with a clique of pro-Milošević members of the Yugoslav army and its general staff, secretly adopted the RAM or "frame" plan that involved the partition of Croatia and Bosnia to give large amounts of territory to the local Serbs that would remain united with Serbia, effectively a Greater Serbia. Armaments and military equipment were placed in strategic positions throughout Croatia and Bosnia for use by the Serbs and local Serbs were trained as police and paramilitary soldiers in preparation for war. Milošević was less interested in annexing the Serb breakaway republic of Krajina. According to testimony by Krajina's former President Milan Babić, Milošević had abandoned plans of having "all Serbs in one state" by March 1991 when he met with Croatian President Franjo Tuđman and discussed the partition of Bosnia. Babić attended the meeting and noted that Milošević stated that "Tuđman needs Bihać" – a city in Bosnia that was separated by Serbian Krajina from Croatian government-controlled territory in Croatia; and then added "He needs a road between Benkovac and Drniš as well" that would involve the road going through territory claimed by Krajina.

Upon the Yugoslav republic of Macedonia seceding in 1991, the Yugoslav government declared Macedonia an "artificial nation" and it allied with Greece against the country, even suggesting a partition of the Republic of Macedonia between Yugoslavia and Greece. Subsequent interviews with government officials involved in these affairs have revealed that Milošević planned to arrest the Republic of Macedonia's political leadership and replace it with politicians loyal to him. Milošević demanded the self-determination of Serbs in the Republic of Macedonia and did not recognize the independence of the Republic of Macedonia until 1996.

Despite the bitterness towards the Macedonian nation whose locals rejected Yugoslav assertions of Serbian ethnicity, the FR Yugoslavia would recognize the Republic of Macedonia in 1996. Four years before this milestone, however, Yugoslav troops and remnants of Belgrade's central government had peacefully and voluntarily left Macedonian territory.

Milošević denounced the declaration of independence of Bosnia and Herzegovina from Yugoslavia in 1992, and said that "Bosnia and Herzegovina was illegally proclaimed as an independent state and recognized. That recognition was like when the Roman Emperor Caligula appointed his horse as a Senator: they recognized a state that never existed before. The Serbs there said, 'We want to stay within Yugoslavia. We don't want to be second-class citizens.' And then the conflicts were started by Muslims, no doubt. And the Serbs, in defending themselves, were always better fighters, no doubt. And they achieved results, no doubt. But please, we were insisting on peace. The international community gave premature recognition first of Slovenia and then of Croatia and supported the independence of Bosnia and Herzegovina on a totally irregular basis." A telephone conversation between Milošević and Bosnian Serb leader Radovan Karadžić in September 1991 talking about the prospects of war in Bosnia and Herzegovina was tapped by Yugoslav intelligence, which reported the transcript to Yugoslav prime minister Ante Marković, who released the transcript to the public to discredit Milošević. The transcript involved Milošević ordering Karadžić to "Go to Uzelac [JNA commander in northern Bosnia], he'll tell you everything. If you have any problems, telephone me." He added, "As long as there is the army no one can touch us ... Don't worry about Herzegovina. Momir [Bulatović, Montenegrin leader] said to his men: 'Whoever is not ready to die in Bosnia, step forward five paces.' No one did so." The conversation revealed that Milošević controlled the military strategy for the war in Bosnia and that Montenegro was under his control.

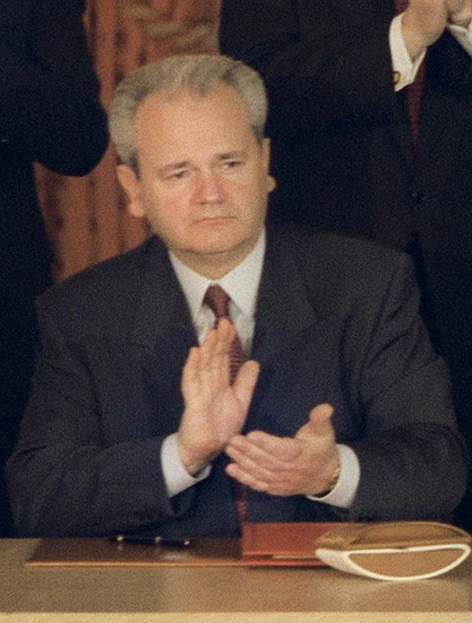
Milošević in 1995

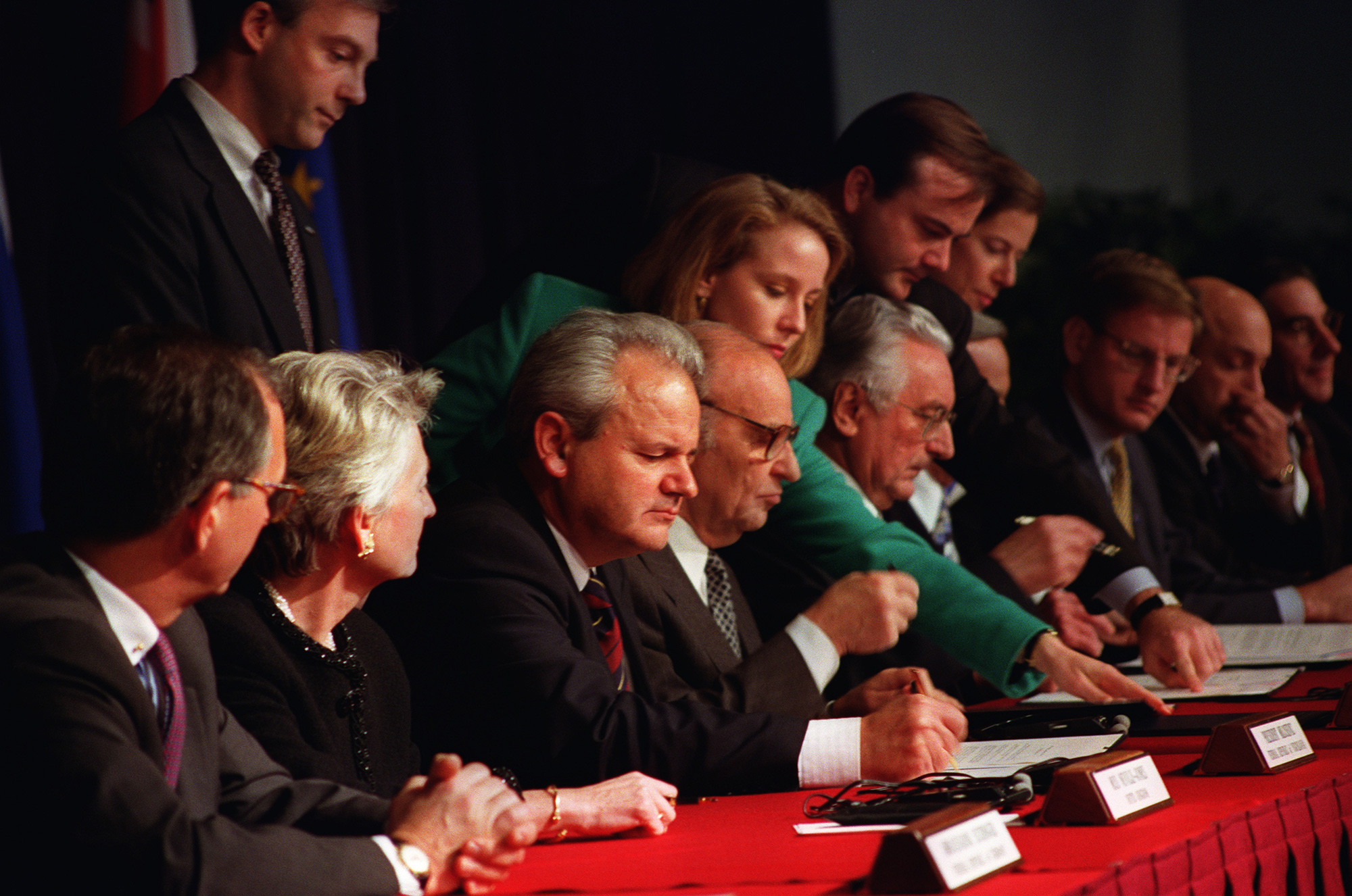
Milošević signing the Dayton Accords in 1995 on behalf of the Bosnian Serb leadership, formally ending the Bosnian War

Vojislav Šešelj, leader of the Serbian Radical Party and a Serbian paramilitary leader during the Yugoslav wars, claimed that Milošević was directly involved in supporting his paramilitaries and controlled Serb forces during the wars: "Milošević organized everything. We gathered the volunteers and he gave us a special barracks, Bubanj Potok, all our uniforms, arms, military technology and buses. All our units were always under the command of the Krajina [Serb army] or [Bosnian] Republika Srpska Army or the JNA. Of course I don't believe he signed anything, these were verbal orders. None of our talks was taped and I never took a paper and pencil when I talked with him. His key people were the commanders. Nothing could happen on the Serbian side without Milošević's order or his knowledge."

Although direct orders to commit atrocities by Milošević have never been discovered, he made little or no effort to punish people deemed responsible for such atrocities, including Ratko Mladić who, after being accused of allowing atrocities to occur against Croats in Vukovar, was sent to lead the Army of the Republika Srpska, in which capacity Mladić was accused of ordering atrocities, including the murder of thousands of Bosniak men and boys in Srebrenica. Even after the reports of Srebrenica were released, Milošević refused to accept that Mladić was responsible for the crimes he was accused of. Wesley Clark, who was a member of the US team that helped negotiate the 1995 Dayton Agreement ending the Bosnian War, claimed in his testimony during the trial of Milošević that Milošević had prior knowledge of the Srebrenica Massacre and knew of Mladić's plans. During the negotiations, Clark had asked Milošević: 'Mr. President, you say you have so much influence over the Bosnian Serbs, but how is it then, if you have such influence, that you allowed General Mladić to kill all those people in Srebrenica?' with Milošević answering: 'Well, General Clark ... I warned Mladić not to do this, but he didn't listen to me.'"

Following the rise of nationalism and political tensions after Milošević came to power, as well as the outbreaks of the Yugoslav Wars, numerous anti-war movements developed in Serbia. The anti-war protests in Belgrade were held mostly because of opposition to the Battle of Vukovar, Siege of Dubrovnik and Siege of Sarajevo, while protesters demanded a referendum on a declaration of war and disruption of military conscription. It is estimated that between 50,000 and 200,000 people deserted from the Milošević-controlled Yugoslav People's Army during wars, while between 100,000 and 150,000 people emigrated from Serbia refusing to participate in the war. According to professor Renaud de la Brosse, senior lecturer at the University of Reims and a witness called by the International Criminal Tribunal for the former Yugoslavia, it is surprising how great the resistance to Milošević's propaganda was among Serbs, given that and the lack of access to alternative news. Political scientists Orli Fridman described that not enough attention was given to anti-war activism among scholars studying the breakup of Yugoslavia and the wars, as well as that independent media and anti-war groups from Serbia did not attract international attention.

== Personal views ==
A large number of Milošević's interviews have been collected online by his supporters. Milošević argued that the Yugoslav Constitution gave self-determination to constitutive nations, not to republics and Serbs were a constitutive nation in both the Socialist Republic of Croatia and the Socialist Republic of Bosnia-Herzegovina. On this basis, he stated that the Croatian Serbs and later the Bosnian Serbs should not have been subject to the declarations of independence by the Yugoslav republics of Croatia and Bosnia and Herzegovina.

Milošević denied that Serbia started the wars, even though Serbia was involved financially and operationally in Croatia and Bosnia. Milošević was President of Serbia, not of Yugoslavia, and claimed that his government was only indirectly involved through support for Serbs in Croatia and Bosnia at some points. Others including former members of his cabinet such as Borisav Jović have admitted that Milošević, while not head of state of Yugoslavia in the early 1990s, in fact played a key role in the military actions taken in Slovenia, Croatia, and Bosnia. This included a scheme discussed and designed by both Jović and Milošević that transferred every Bosnian Serb unit from the Yugoslav army (JNA) to the newly formed Bosnian Serb army upon Bosnia's separation from Yugoslavia, which meant that Yugoslavia could not be criticized for occupying parts of Bosnia as it was officially a civil war, although Jović admitted that the Bosnian Serb Army was fully funded by Belgrade because the Bosnian Serb military budget was too small to support such an army.

Milošević spent most of 1988 and 1989 focusing his politics on the "Kosovo problem". In Kosovo, to seem non-contradictory, Milošević alleged that he supported the right of the Albanians to "self-determination", but not to independence, as he claimed that Kosovo was an essential part of Serbia due to its history and its numerous churches and cultural relics. He also claimed that the KLA were a neo-Nazi organisation that sought an ethnically pure Kosovo, and he argued that independence would deliver Kosovo to their hands. Milošević denied that he gave orders to massacre Albanians in 1998. He claimed that the deaths were sporadic events confined to rural areas of West Kosovo committed by paramilitaries and by rebels in the armed forces. Those from the Serbian army or police who were involved were all, he claimed, arrested and many were given long prison sentences.

The former United States ambassador to Yugoslavia Warren Zimmermann, during his conversations with Milošević, claimed that he was not a genuine nationalist, but rather a political opportunist. Zimmerman has claimed that unlike other politicians with whom he had discussions during the collapse of Yugoslavia, such as Franjo Tuđman and Radovan Karadžić, Milošević did not emphasize any hatred of ethnic groups and instead emphasized that Serbia would continue to be a multi-ethnic republic in Yugoslavia. Zimmerman has claimed that Milošević opportunistically used nationalism to allow him to rise to power in the Communist establishment in Serbia as Communism in eastern Europe became increasingly unpopular, and continued to advocate a nationalist agenda to draw in support for his government. On another occasion, however, Milošević revealed to Zimmerman his negative attitude towards ethnic Albanians who had demanded autonomy, and in the 1990s, independence from Serbia and Yugoslavia. Milošević told Zimmerman jokingly that the Albanians of Kosovo were the most pampered minority in Europe. Milošević also was known to talk disparagingly about Slovenes, when he in conversation with an interviewer of what he thought of the Slovene delegation's decision to depart the League of Communists of Yugoslavia, Milošević made a derogatory joke, calling the League of Communists of Slovenia delegation, "those stingy Slovenes". Zimmerman later reported that Milošević's unusual and conflicting positions and mannerisms were almost schizophrenic in nature, as at times Milošević would behave in an arrogant, stubborn, authoritarian and aggressive manner towards others, which staunchly supported Serbian nationalism against all opponents, while at other times he would be polite, conciliatory, and be eager and willing to find moderate and peaceful solutions to the crisis in Yugoslavia. Zimmerman has concluded, however, that Milošević constantly demonstrated that he primarily saw Yugoslavia as a state for ensuring the unity of Serbs, and did not have much interest in preserving the unity of Yugoslavia outside areas of Serb national interests.

Milošević's personality, according to others, indicated a multi-layered nature. In public appearances, he would appear strong, confident, bold and serious, while in private, it is said that Milošević was very laid-back, and according to the former director of Politika, Hadži Dragan Antić, Milošević was often interested in non-political things such as comic strips and Disney cartoons and admired the music of Frank Sinatra. Milošević only allowed a close inner circle of personal friends to visit him, while others including the former Information Minister of Serbia during Milošević's era, Aleksandar Tijanić, have said that in private Milošević demonstrated elements of paranoia to many people outside of his inner circle, such as demanding that Tijanić remove the battery from his mobile phone on each occasion that Tijanić met him. Milošević also refused to keep notes on talks on important issues and would only meet with his most trusted allies, to whom he simply gave directions and instructions without engaging in substantial discussion.

== Murders of political opponents ==
In the summer of 2000, former Serbian President Ivan Stambolić was kidnapped; his body was found in 2003 and Milošević was charged with ordering his murder. In 2005, several members of the Serbian secret police and criminal gangs were convicted in Belgrade for a number of murders, including Stambolić's. These were the same people who arrested Milošević in April 2001. In June 2006, the Supreme Court of Serbia ruled that Milošević had ordered the murder of Stambolić, accepting the previous ruling of the Special Court for Organized Crime in Belgrade, which targeted Milošević as the main abettor of politically motivated murders in the 1990s. Milošević's attorneys said the Court's ruling was of little value because he was never formally charged or given an opportunity to defend himself against the accusations. Moreover, most of these murders were of government officials, such as high police official Radovan Stojičić, Defence Minister Pavle Bulatović, and the director of Jat Airways Žika Petrović.

== Downfall ==
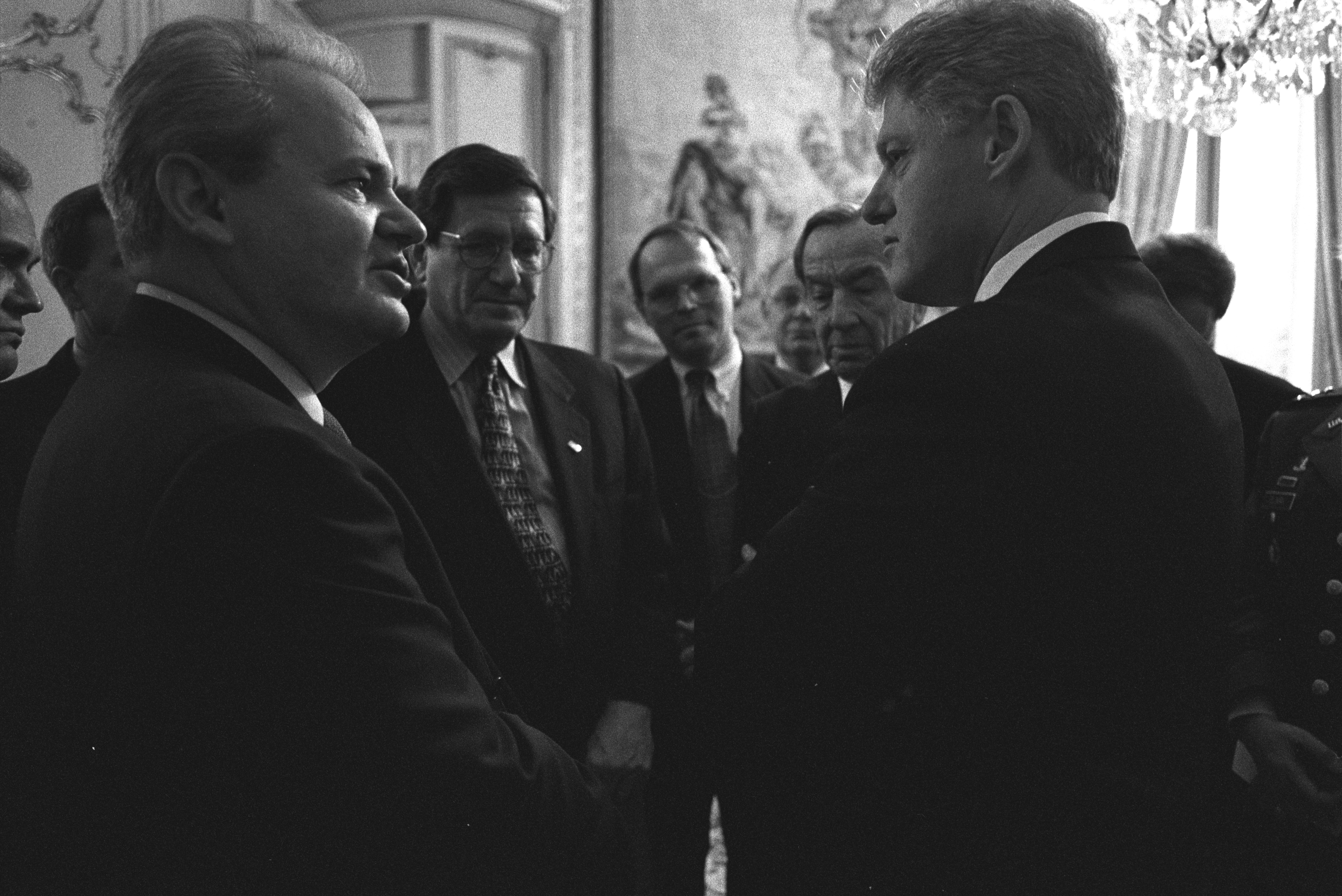
Milošević meets with US President Bill Clinton in Paris on 14 December 1995

On 4 February 1997, Milošević recognized the opposition victories in some local elections, after mass protests lasting 96 days. Constitutionally limited to two terms as President of Serbia, on 23 July 1997, Milošević assumed the presidency of the Federation, though it had been understood he had held the real power for some time before then.

Serbian police and military counter-action against the pro-Albanian separatist Kosovo Liberation Army in Serbia's previously autonomous province of Kosovo culminated in escalating armed conflict in 1998 and NATO air strikes against Yugoslavia between March and June 1999, ending in full withdrawal of Yugoslav security forces from the province and deployment of international civil and security forces. Milošević was indicted on 24 May 1999 for war crimes and crimes against humanity committed in Kosovo, and he was standing trial, up until his death, at the International Criminal Tribunal for the Former Yugoslavia (ICTY). He asserted that the trial was illegal, having been established in contravention of the UN Charter.

Ironically, Milošević lost his grip on power when he lost elections that he scheduled prematurely (that is, before the end of his mandate) and that he did not even need to win in order to retain power, which was centered in the parliaments that his party and its associates controlled. In the five-man presidential race held on 24 September 2000, Milošević was defeated in the first round by opposition leader Vojislav Koštunica, who won slightly more than 50% of the vote. Milošević initially refused to acquiesce, claiming that no one had won a majority. The Yugoslav constitution called for a runoff between the top two candidates in the event that no candidate won more than 50% of the vote. Official results put Koštunica ahead of Milošević, but at under 50 percent. The internationally financed CeSID claimed otherwise, though its story changed throughout the two weeks between 24 September and 5 October. This led to mass demonstrations in Belgrade on 5 October, known as the Bulldozer Revolution. Milošević was forced to accept this when Yugoslav Army commanders he had expected to support him had indicated that in this instance they would not, and would permit the violent overthrow of the Serbian government. On 6 October, Milošević met with Koštunica and publicly accepted defeat. Koštunica finally took office as Yugoslav president on 7 October following Milošević's announcement.

Milošević was arrested by Yugoslav authorities on 1 April 2001, following a 36-hour armed standoff between police and Milošević's bodyguards at his Belgrade villa. Although no official charges were made, Milošević was suspected of abuse of power and corruption.

Following his arrest, the United States pressured the Yugoslav government to extradite Milošević to the ICTY or lose financial aid from the IMF and World Bank. President Koštunica opposed extradition of Milošević, arguing that it would violate the Yugoslav constitution. Prime Minister Zoran Đinđić called a governmental meeting to issue a decree for extradition. Milošević's lawyers appealed the extradition process to the Yugoslav constitutional court. The court requested two weeks to deliberate the appeal. Ignoring objections from the president and the constitutional court, Đinđić ordered the extradition of Milošević to the ICTY. On 28 June, Milošević was flown by helicopter from Belgrade to a US airbase in Tuzla, Bosnia and Herzegovina and from there he was then flown to The Hague, Netherlands.

The extradition caused political turmoil in Yugoslavia. President Koštunica denounced the extradition as illegal and unconstitutional, while a junior party in the Đinđić coalition government left in protest. Milošević's lawyer, Toma Fila, said the extradition violated the Yugoslav constitutional ban on extradition. Đinđić stated there would be negative consequences if the government did not cooperate. Additionally, the government argued that sending Milošević to the ICTY was not extradition as it is a UN institution and not a foreign country. Following the extradition, a group of donors pledged approximately $1 billion dollars in financial aid to Yugoslavia.

== Relations with other countries ==
=== Russia ===
Historically, Russia and Serbia have had very close relations, sharing a common Slavic ancestry and Orthodox Christian faith. Russia is remembered by most Serbs for its assistance to Serbia during its uprising and war for independence from the Ottoman Empire in the 19th century. During Milošević's rule, Russia pursued policies that generally supported his policies. During the Kosovo conflict in 1999, some observers suggested the possibility of Russia deploying troops in support of Serbia. Russia has provided political asylum to Milošević's wife and children.

=== China ===
Milošević first visited China in the early 1980s while being head of Beobanka. He visited China again in 1997, after an invitation by Chinese president Jiang Zemin. Milošević was often popularly known in China by the nickname "Lao Mi" (老米), a shortened form of the informal Chinese-style nickname "Old Milošević" (老米洛舍维奇); among the state-operated media in China, Milošević was often referred to as "Comrade Milošević" (米洛舍维奇同志). Many sources hold that the Chinese government asserted strong backing of Milošević throughout his presidency until his surrender, and was one of the few countries supportive of him and the Yugoslav government, at a time when most Western countries were strongly critical of the Milošević government. The New York Times stated that the People's Republic of China was "one of Mr. Milošević's staunchest supporters" during the Kosovo conflict. China vocally opposed NATO armed intervention in Kosovo throughout the campaign. Chinese parliamentary leader Li Peng was presented by Milošević with Yugoslavia's highest medal (the Great Star) in Belgrade in 2000. Marko Milošević, the son of the deposed Milošević, was turned away by China on 9 October 2000. Marko Milošević may have attempted to travel to China because of the £100 million allegedly laundered into Chinese banks by the Milošević family.

The New York Times observed that Milošević, and particularly his wife Marković, had "long viewed Beijing and its Communist party" as allies and "the sort of ideological comrades" lacking in Eastern Europe after the fall of Communism in the 1990s. After Milošević's indictment, China's public statements shifted toward emphasizing Yugoslav-Chinese relations rather than focusing on its support for Milošević, while after the election of Vojislav Koštunica as Yugoslav president, Chinese foreign ministry officially stated that "China respects the choice of the Yugoslavian people."

== Trial at The Hague ==
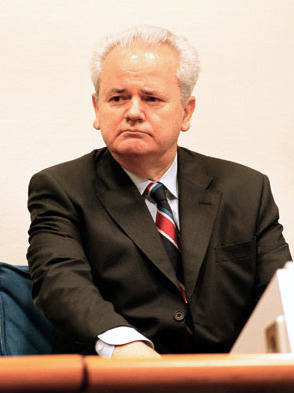
Milošević on trial in July 2001

Milošević was indicted in May 1999, during the Kosovo War, by the UN's International Criminal Tribunal for the former Yugoslavia for crimes against humanity in Kosovo. Charges of violating the laws or customs of war, grave breaches of the Geneva Conventions in Croatia and Bosnia and genocide in Bosnia were added a year and a half later.

The charges Milošević was indicted on were: genocide; complicity in genocide; deportation; murder; persecutions on political, racial or religious grounds; inhumane acts/forcible transfer; extermination; imprisonment; torture; willful killing; unlawful confinement; willfully causing great suffering; unlawful deportation or transfer; extensive destruction and appropriation of property, not justified by military necessity and carried out unlawfully and wantonly; cruel treatment; plunder of public or private property; attacks on civilians; destruction or willful damage done to historic monuments and institutions dedicated to education or religion; unlawful attacks on civilian objects. The ICTY indictment reads that Milošević was responsible for the forced deportation of 800,000 ethnic Albanians from Kosovo, and the murder of hundreds of Kosovo Albanians and hundreds of non-Serbs in Croatia and Bosnia.

Following Milošević's transfer, the original charges of war crimes in Kosovo were upgraded by adding charges of genocide in Bosnia and war crimes in Croatia. On 30 January 2002, Milošević accused the war crimes tribunal of an "evil and hostile attack" against him. The trial began at The Hague on 12 February 2002, with Milošević defending himself.

The prosecution took two years to present its case in the first part of the trial, where they covered the wars in Croatia, Bosnia and Kosovo. Throughout the two-year period, the trial was being closely followed by the public of the involved former Yugoslav republics as it covered various notable events from the war and included several high-profile witnesses.

Milošević died before the trial's conclusion.

=== Posthumous verdicts ===
Following his death, in four separate verdicts, he was found to be a part of a joint criminal enterprise which used crimes to remove Croats, Bosniaks and Albanians from large parts of Croatia, Bosnia and Herzegovina, and Kosovo. In 2007, in its verdicts against Republic of Serbian Krajina President Milan Martić, the ICTY concluded:

Between 1991 and 1995, Martić held positions of minister of interior, minister of defense and president of the self-proclaimed "Serbian Autonomous Region of Krajina" (SAO Krajina), which was later renamed "Republic of Serbian Krajina" (RSK). He was found to have participated during this period in a joint criminal enterprise which included Milošević, whose aim was to create a unified Serbian state through commission of a widespread and systematic campaign of crimes against non-Serbs inhabiting areas in Croatia and Bosnia and Herzegovina envisaged to become parts of such a state.

— International Criminal Tribunal for the former Yugoslavia, verdict against Milan Martić

In its 2021 verdict against Serbia's operatives Jovica Stanišić and Franko Simatović, the follow-up International Residual Mechanism for Criminal Tribunals concluded:

The Trial Chamber, therefore, finds proven beyond reasonable doubt that, from at least August 1991, and at all times relevant to the crimes charged in the Indictment, a common criminal purpose existed to forcibly and permanently remove, through the commission of the crimes of persecution, murder, deportation and inhumane acts (forcible transfer), the majority of non-Serbs, principally Croats, Bosnian Muslim and Bosnian Croats, from large areas of Croatia and Bosnia and Herzegovina. The Trial Chamber finds that the common criminal purpose, as defined above, was shared by senior political, military, and police leadership in Serbia, the SAO Krajina, the SAO SBWS, and Republika Srpska, with the core members, among others and varying depending on the area and timing of the commission of the crimes, being Slobodan Milošević.

— International Residual Mechanism for Criminal Tribunals, verdict against Stanišić and Simatović

In the two Kosovo verdicts, the Nikola Šainović et al. and Vlastimir Đorđević cases, Milošević was found to have been "one of the crucial members" of the criminal enterprise aimed at uprooting large parts of Albanians from Kosovo.

In February 2007, the International Court of Justice cleared Serbia under Milošević's rule of direct responsibility for occurrences of crime committed during the Bosnian War. The president of the International Court of Justice (ICJ), however, did state that it was "'conclusively proved' that the Serbian leadership, and Milošević in particular, 'were fully aware ... that massacres were likely to occur'". In its 2016 verdict regarding Radovan Karadžić, the ICTY found that "there was no sufficient evidence presented in this case to find that Slobodan Milošević agreed with the common plan [to create territories ethnically cleansed of non-Serbs]" citing "Milošević's repeated criticism and disapproval of the policies and decisions made by the Accused and the Bosnian Serb leadership", though it also noted that "Milošević provided assistance in the form of personnel, provisions and arms to Bosnian Serbs during the conflict".

== Death ==
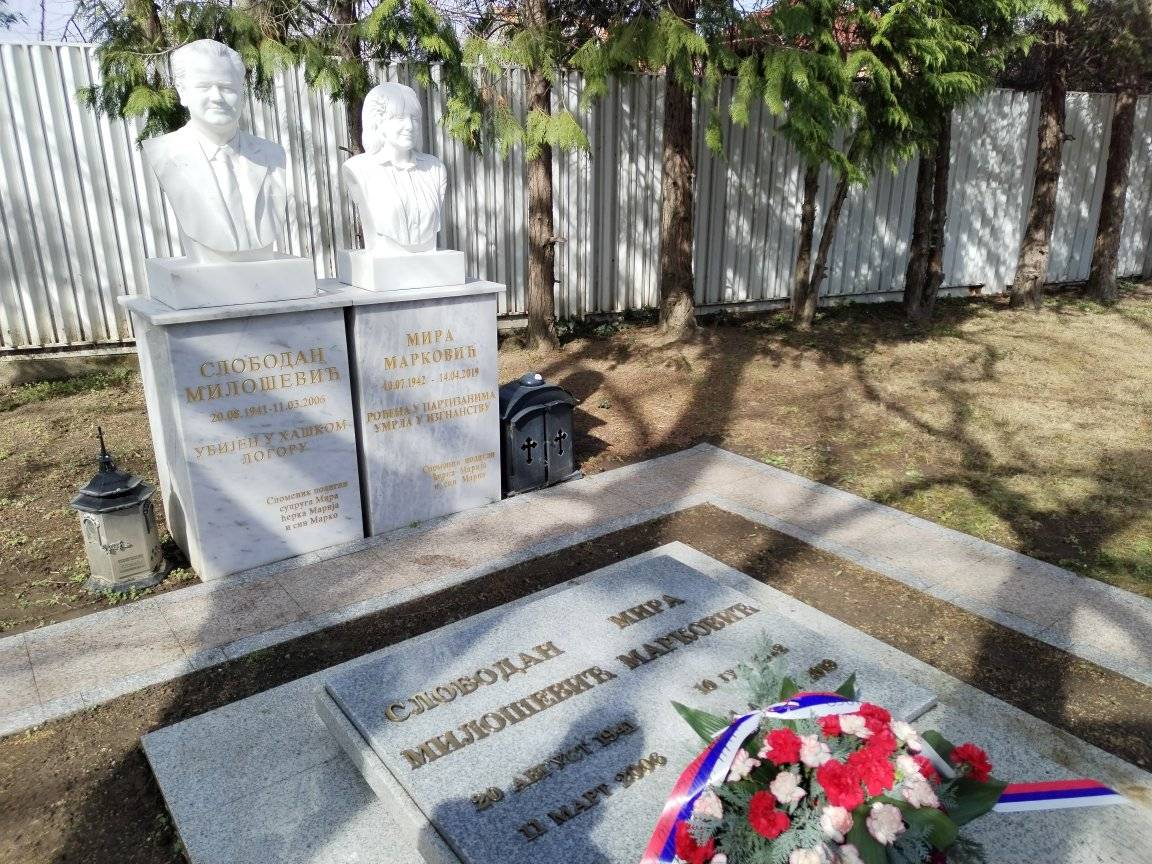
The final resting place of Milošević and his wife in their hometown of Požarevac

On 11 March 2006, Milošević was found dead in his prison cell in the UN war crimes tribunal's detention centre, located in the Scheveningen section of The Hague, Netherlands. Autopsies soon established that Milošević had died of a heart attack; he had been suffering from heart problems and high blood pressure. Many suspicions were voiced to the effect that the heart attack had been caused or made possible deliberately – by the ICTY, according to sympathizers, or by himself, according to critics.

Milošević's death occurred shortly after the Tribunal denied his request to seek specialised medical treatment at a cardiology clinic in Russia. The reactions to Milošević's death were mixed: supporters of the ICTY lamented what they saw as Milošević having remained unpunished, while opponents blamed the Tribunal for what had happened.

A private funeral was held by Milošević's friends and family in his hometown of Požarevac, after tens of thousands of his supporters attended a farewell ceremony in Belgrade. The return of Milošević's body and his widow's return to Serbia were very controversial. Attendees of the funeral included Ramsey Clark and Peter Handke.

== Legacy ==
The last opinion poll taken in Serbia before Milošević's death listed him as the third-most favourably rated politician in Serbia behind then-Serbian Radical Party chairman Tomislav Nikolić and then-Serbian President Boris Tadić. In 2010, Life website included Milošević in its list of "The World's Worst Dictators". He remains a controversial figure in Serbia and the Balkans due to the Yugoslav wars and his abuse of power, especially during the 1997 and 2000 elections. Milošević's public image in Serbia oscillated between a faceless bureaucrat to a defender of Serbs, while Western attitudes ranged from Milošević being labeled as the "Butcher of the Balkans" to his portrayal as the "guarantor of the peace in the Balkans".

== Sources ==
=== Books ===
- Ackermann, Alice (2000). Making Peace Prevail: Preventing Violent Conflict in Macedonia (1st ed.). Syracuse, NY: Syracuse University Press. ISBN 978-0-8156-0602-4.
- Armatta, Judith (2010). Twilight of Impunity: The War Crimes Trial of Slobodan Milosevic. Duke University Press. ISBN 978-0-8223-4746-0.
- Bokovoy, Melissa K. (1997). State-Society Relations in Yugoslavia 1945–1992. New York, NY: St. Martin's Press. ISBN 978-0-312-12690-2.
- Burg, Steven L.; Shoup, Paul S. (1999). The War in Bosnia-Herzegovina: Ethnic Conflict and International Intervention. Armonk, NY: M.E. Sharpe. ISBN 978-1-56324-308-0.
- Cohen, Lenard J. (2001). Serpent in the Bosom: The Rise and Fall of Slobodan Milošević. Westview Press. ISBN 978-0-8133-2902-4.
- Doder, Dusko; Branson, Louise (1999). Milosevic: Portrait of a Tyrant. Free Press. ISBN 978-1-4391-3639-3.
- Gagnon, V. P. (2004). The Myth of Ethnic War: Serbia and Croatia in the 1990s. Ithaca, NY: Cornell University Press. ISBN 978-0-8014-4264-3.
- Gordy, Eric C. (1999). The Culture of Power in Serbia: Nationalism and the Destruction of Alternatives. Pennsylvania State University Press. ISBN 0-271-01958-1.
- Hagan, John (2003). Justice in the Balkans: Prosecuting War Crimes in the Hague Tribunal. Chicago, IL: University of Chicago Press. ISBN 978-0-226-31228-6.
- Henriksen, Dag (2007). NATO's Gamble: Combining Diplomacy and Airpower in the Kosovo Crisis 1998–1999. Annapolis, MD: Naval Institute Press. ISBN 978-1-59114-355-0.
- Jović, Dejan (2009). Yugoslavia: A State That Withered Away. West Lafayette, IN: Purdue University Press. ISBN 978-1-55753-495-8.
- LeBor, Adam (2004). Milosevic: A Biography. New Haven, CT: Yale University Press. ISBN 978-0-300-10317-5.
- Nitis, Takis (2011). The "Trial" of Slobodan Milocevic. Athens, Greece: Ocelotos Publications. p. 236. ISBN 978-960-9607-05-6.
- Pavlowitch, Stevan K. (2002). Serbia: The History behind the Name. London: Hurst & Company. ISBN 9781850654773. Archived from the original on 11 March 2025.
- Petersen, Roger D. (30 September 2011). Western Intervention in the Balkans: The Strategic Use of Emotion in Conflict. Cambridge University Press. ISBN 978-1-139-50330-3.
- Post, Jerrold M.; George, Alexander L. (2004). Leaders and Their Followers in a Dangerous World: The Psychology of Political Behaviour. Ithaca, NY: Cornell University Press. ISBN 978-0-8014-4169-1.
- Ramet, Sabrina P. (2006). The Three Yugoslavias: State-Building and Legitimation, 1918–2005. Bloomington, IN: Indiana University Press. ISBN 978-0-253-34656-8.
- Sell, Louis (2002). Slobodan Milosevic and the Destruction of Yugoslavia. Durham, NC: Duke University Press. ISBN 978-0-8223-2870-4.
- Sriram, Chandra Lekha; Martin-Ortega, Olga; Herman, Johanna (2010). War, Conflict and Human rights: Theory and Practice. London, UK; New York, NY: Routledge. ISBN 978-0-415-45205-2.
- Thompson, Mark (1994). Forging War: The Media in Serbia, Croatia and Bosnia-Hercegovina. International Centre Against Censorship, Article 19. Avon, United Kingdom: The Bath Press.
- Wydra, Harald (2007). Communism and the Emergence of Democracy. Cambridge, UK; New York, NY: Cambridge University Press. ISBN 978-0-521-85169-5.
- Zimmermann, Warren (1996). Origins of a Catastrophe: Yugoslavia and its Destroyers (1st ed.). New York, NY: Times Books. ISBN 978-0-8129-6399-1.
- Powers, Roger S (1997). Protest, Power, and Change: An Encyclopedia of Nonviolent Action from ACT-UP to Women's Suffrage. Routledge. ISBN 9781136764820.
- Udovicki, Jasminka; Ridgeway, James (2000). Burn This House: The Making and Unmaking of Yugoslavia. Durham, North Carolina: Duke University Press. ISBN 9781136764820.

=== News reports ===
- Eckholm, Erik (8 October 2000). "Showdown in Yugoslavia: An Ally". The New York Times. Archived from the original on 9 January 2012.

Party political offices
| Preceded by Ivan Stambolić | Chairman of the League of Communists of Serbia; 1986–1989 | Succeeded by Bogdan Trifunović |
| Preceded by Position established | President of the Socialist Party of Serbia; 1990–1991 | Succeeded by Borisav Jović |
| Preceded by Borisav Jović | President of the Socialist Party of Serbia; 1992–2006 | Succeeded by Ivica Dačić |
Political offices
| Preceded by Petar Gračanin as President of the Presidency of the Socialist Republic of Serbia | President of Serbia; 1989–1997 | Succeeded by Dragan Tomić; Acting |
| Preceded by Zoran Lilić | President of the Federal Republic of Yugoslavia; 1997–2000 | Succeeded by Vojislav Koštunica |
