= Milisav Koljenšić =

Montenegrin Major General with the Yugoslav People's Army

- Born: 31 December 1912; Danilovgrad, Kingdom of Montenegro
- Died: 26 March 1963 (aged 50); Belgrade, PR Serbia, FPR Yugoslavia
- Military career
- Allegiance: (Socialist Federal Republic of Yugoslavia) SFR Yugoslavia
- Branch: Yugoslav People's Army
- Rank: Major General
- Conflicts: World War II in Yugoslavia

Milisav Koljenšić (Serbian Cyrillic: Милисав Кољеншић; 31 December 1912 – 26 March 1963) was a Montenegrin Major General with the Yugoslav People's Army. He is notable for being the maternal uncle of Slobodan Milošević.

== Career ==
Prior to the Second World War, he practiced law. In 1941, he joined the Yugoslav Partisans and the Communist Party of Yugoslavia. During the war, he was the political commissar of several units. He later graduated from the Yugoslav People's Army Higher Military Academy. After the war he was head of the KOS department and head of the School Security Center.

He had a brother named Vlado.

== Death and legacy ==
He died from suicide in 1963. He is interred in the Alley of People's Heroes in the Belgrade New Cemetery. His wife Hristina "Kitka" Koljenšić (1922–2017) was interred next to him upon her death.

An elementary school in Danilovgrad is named after him.
