= Overthrow of Slobodan Milošević =

2000 overthrow of Yugoslav President Slobodan Milošević

Bulldozer Revolution
- Part of the Yugoslav Wars and the colour revolutions
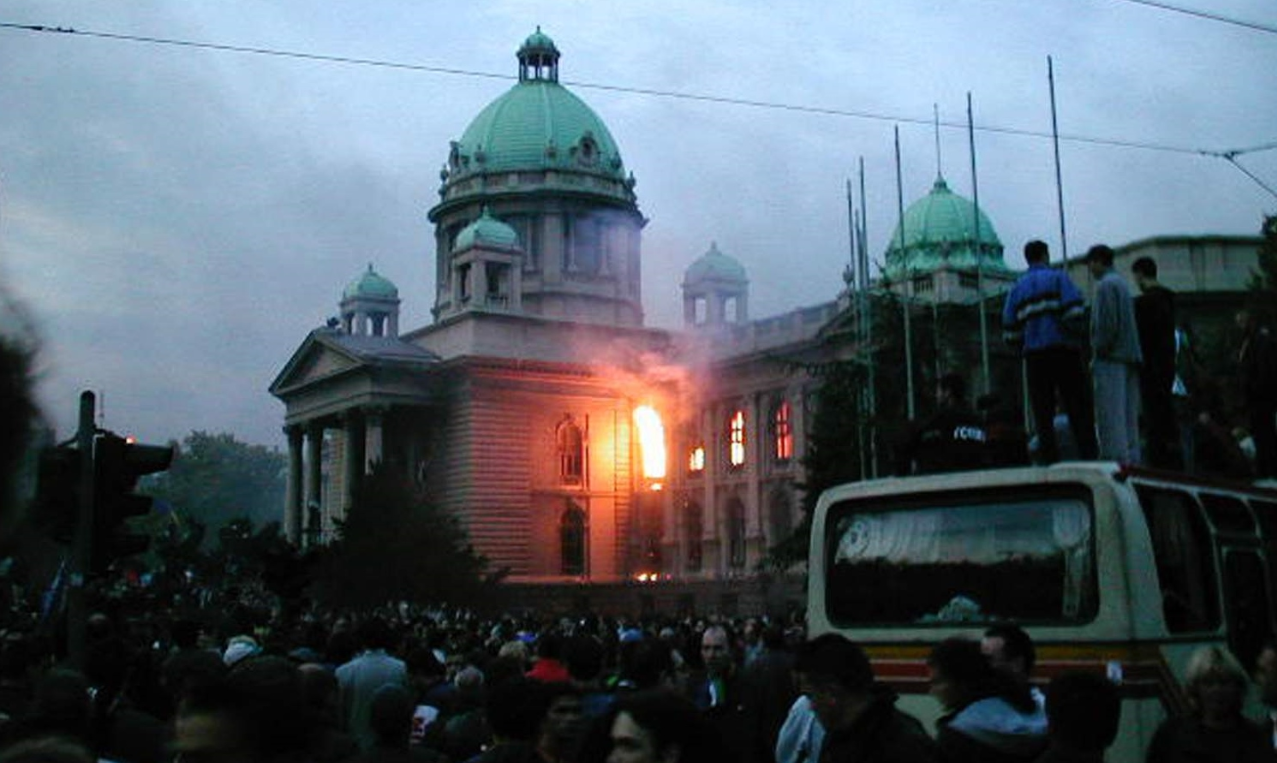
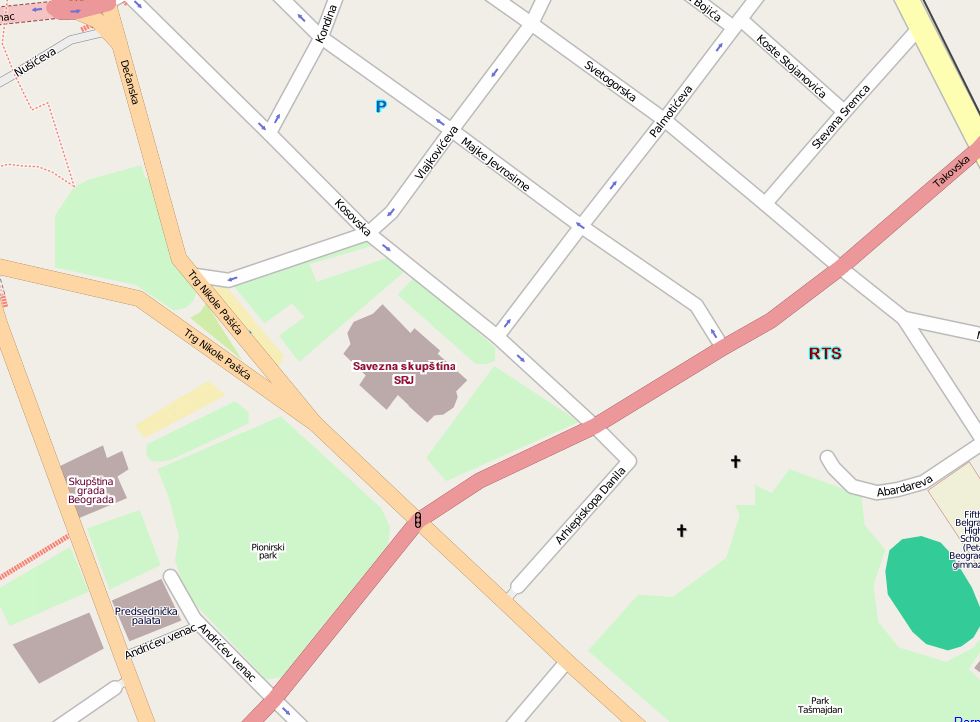
- Top: Protesters at the House of the Federal Assembly of the Federal Republic of Yugoslavia, as it was on fire Bottom: Map of significant buildings during the protests
- Date: 29 September – 5 October 2000 (6 days)
- Location: Serbia, FR Yugoslavia: Belgrade; Novi Sad; Čačak
- Caused by: Accusations of electoral fraud; Media censorship; International sanctions; Yugoslav Wars; Autocracy; Government corruption; Political violence; Police brutality; Arrests of Otpor! activists
- Goals: Removal of Slobodan Milošević and all of his government representation; Regime change; Democratization; Freedom of the media; Free and fair elections
- Methods: Protests; Demonstrations; Riots; Civil disobedience; Civil resistance; Occupation of administrative buildings; Barricades; Property damage; Violence; Vandalism; Traffic obstruction; Looting
- Result: DOS victory: Slobodan Milošević resigns; Vojislav Koštunica declared winner; Withdrawal of international sanctions; Yugoslavia becomes a member of the United Nations and other international organizations; DOS secured a supermajority in the parliamentary elections; Return of the Yugoslav Army to the Ground Safety Zone; The arrest of Slobodan Milošević and extradition to ICTY to stand trial for charges of war crimes

Parties
Anti-government protesters led by Democratic Opposition of Serbia: Civilian and student protesters; Pro-EU supporters; Government of Montenegro; Nationalists; Monarchists; Serbian Orthodox Church; Defected policemen; Civic organizations: Otpor!; Supported by: United States	Federal government of Yugoslavia: Government of Serbia; Ministry of Interior; Police of Serbia; Government parties: Socialist Party of Serbia; Socialist People's Party of Montenegro; Yugoslav Left

Lead figures
Vojislav Koštunica; Zoran Đinđić; Velimir Ilić; Goran Svilanović; Čedomir Jovanović; Srđa Popović	Slobodan Milošević; Momir Bulatović; Mirko Marjanović; Radomir Marković; Mirjana Marković

Number
Hundreds of thousands	Unknown number of policemen

Casualties
- Deaths: 2 (non-violent)
- Injuries: 65

The overthrow of Slobodan Milošević, president of the Federal Republic of Yugoslavia, began after the general election on 24 September 2000 and culminated on 5 October 2000. It is commonly referred to as the 5 October Revolution (Serbian: Петооктобарска револуција, romanized: Petooktobarska revolucija) or as the Bulldozer Revolution (Багер револуција, Bager revolucija), after an event during the day-long protest in which a heavy equipment operator charged the Radio Television of Serbia building, considered to be symbolic of the Milošević regime's propaganda.

Milošević's rule has been described by observers as authoritarian or autocratic, as well as kleptocratic, with numerous accusations of electoral fraud, political assassinations, suppression of media freedom and police brutality. His role in the Yugoslav Wars led to international sanctions against Yugoslavia, which had a devastating impact on the Yugoslav economy and society, while NATO bombing significantly damaged the country's infrastructure. While the overthrow of Milošević was reported as a spontaneous revolution, there had been a year-long battle involving thousands of Serbs in a strategy to strip the leader of his legitimacy, turn his security forces against him, and force him to call for elections, the result of which he would not acknowledge.

== Prelude ==
Milošević's rule had been described by observers as authoritarian or autocratic, as well as kleptocratic, with numerous accusations of electoral fraud, political assassinations, suppression of media freedom and police brutality. He became the first sitting head of state to be charged with war crimes. His role in the Yugoslav Wars led to international sanctions against Yugoslavia, which had a devastating impact on the Yugoslav economy and society, while NATO bombing significantly damaged the country's infrastructure. While the overthrow of Milošević was reported as a spontaneous revolution, there had been a year-long battle involving thousands of Serbs in a strategy to remove the leader's legitimacy, turn his security forces against him, and force him to call for elections, the result of which he would not acknowledge.

In 1998, a dozen students met to form Otpor! (Serbian for "resistance"). Analysing the 1996–97 protests, they realised they needed more effective organisation, strategy, planning, and recruiting for a sustained fight. Galvanised by outrage over new laws that imposed political control of their universities and harassment of independent media, the Otpor students called for the removal of Milošević and the establishment of democracy and the rule of law.

Prior to this, Milošević was cracking down on opposition, non-government organisations and independent media. From 1991 onwards there were campaigns of civil resistance against his administration that were to culminate in the largely non-violent revolution of October 2000. As the end of his first term in office of the president of Yugoslavia approached (previously, he had been elected president of Serbia, in two terms, from 1989 to 1997), on 6 July 2000, the rules of the election of the president were changed. Whilst the president of Yugoslavia had previously been chosen for one term only by the legislature, in the Yugoslav parliament, it was now to be directly elected via the two-round voting system of presidential elections with a maximum of two terms. Many onlookers believed that Milošević's intentions for supporting such reforms had more to do with holding power than with improving democracy. On 27 July 2000, the authorities announced that the early elections were to be held 24 September 2000, although Milošević's term wouldn't expire until 23 July 2001. The elections for the upper house of the federal parliament, Council of Citizens (Veće građana), as well as the local elections were also scheduled to be held on the same date.

On 25 August 2000, Ivan Stambolić, a former mentor and political ally of Milošević, was mysteriously kidnapped and detained from his home and was summarily executed in Fruška Gora. The hit was believed to have been initiated by Milošević so he could prevent Stambolić from being a potential electoral opponent. His decomposed body was found three years later in March 2003. The four officers who had kidnapped him were sentenced. Milošević was charged for initiating the assassination.

== Elections ==
The vote took place on 24 September 2000. The DOS coalition reported that Vojislav Koštunica won over half of the votes, enough to defeat Milošević in a single round. The government-controlled Federal Electoral Committee claimed that no candidate won over 50% of the votes and that a second round between Koštunica and Milošević would take place. These unexpected results provoked stronger accusations of election fraud and led DOS to call for peaceful protests to topple the government.

Some obvious irregularities could be found in the Federal Electoral Committee official results. For example, the sum of the numbers of valid and invalid votes was not equal to the number of voters; the sum of the numbers of the voters voting at the polling stations and the voters voting at home exceeded the total number of voters; the sum of the numbers of the used and the unused ballot papers was short by 117,244 in comparison to the number of eligible voters, the number of eligible voters was different from the one announced before the elections and has differed in the presidential, federal and local elections results.

All of these discrepancies provoked massive outrage. The results were declared false immediately after Milošević was removed, and revised official results were released shortly afterwards. The new results were practically the same, except for the number of total votes and the votes for Milošević, both of which were lower by 125,000–130,000 votes, thus giving Koštunica an absolute, if narrow, first-round victory; Koštunica finished with just 11,843 votes over the threshold to avoid a runoff (4,916,920 voters cast their votes, so 2,458,461 votes were needed for a "50% of turnout + 1 vote" first round victory; Koštunica got 2,470,304 votes).

Differences between the official results proclaimed by Federal Electoral Committee before and after 5 October
Candidate	Nominator	Official results (28 September 2000)		Official results (10 October 2000)	
Candidate	Nominator	Votes	%	Votes	%
Vojislav Koštunica	Democratic Opposition of Serbia	2,474,392	48.96%	2,470,304	50.24%
Slobodan Milošević	SPS–JUL–SNP	1,951,761	38.62%	1,826,799	37.15%
Tomislav Nikolić	Serbian Radical Party	292,759	5.79%	289,013	5.88%
Vojislav Mihailović	Serbian Renewal Movement	146,585	2.90%	145,019	2.95%
Miodrag Vidojković	Affirmative Party	46,421	0.92%	45,964	0.93%
Total valid votes (percentage of total votes)		4,911,918	97.20%	4,778,929	97.19%
Invalid votes (percentage of total votes)		135,371	2.68%	137,991	2.81%
Total votes (turnout)		5,053,428	69.70%	4,916,920	71.55%
Eligible voters		7,249,831		6,871,595	

== Protests and overthrow ==
The protests initially started with strikers at the Kolubara coal mines on 29 September, which produced most of Serbia's electricity. The protest reached its height on 5 October 2000. Several hundred thousand protesters from all over Serbia arrived in Belgrade to protest, chanting "Gotov je!" ("He's finished!") Unlike previous protests, there was no large scale police crackdown. The parliament was partially burned during the protests.

Ljubisav Đokić (Note: Serbian Cyrillic: Љубисав Ђокић; nicknamed "Džo" ("Џо"), the Serbian phonetical translation of Joe) (1943–2020) became the main symbol of the overthrow with his wheel loader. Đokić used his wheel loader (not bulldozer, as the event's colloquial name suggests) to ram a public broadcaster building in Belgrade. The building's tenant, Serbian state television RTS, had for a decade been a symbol and bastion of Milošević's rule. When their studios were taken over, the station was quickly renamed Novi RTS ("New RTS") as a sign that the regime had lost power.

Although the protest was mostly peaceful, without a larger escalation of violence, 65 people were injured in the riots and two people died:

- Jasmina Jovanović fell under an excavator or a truck.
- Momčilo Stakić succumbed to a fatal heart attack.

In the time between elections and the protest, Milošević said that he would resign but only when his term expired in June 2001. Due to pressure caused by the protests, Milošević resigned on 5 October 2000.

== U.S. involvement in the revolution ==
For a year leading up to the elections, the United States-funded consultants played a crucial role in the anti-Milošević campaign. The key symbol of the campaign was the slogan Gotov je! (Serbian Cyrillic: Готов је!, meaning "He is finished!"), created by Otpor!. Part of the U.S. funding of the opposition (a reported $41 million) included 2.5 million stickers with the slogan and 5,000 spray cans for anti-Milošević graffiti. Material was channeled by the U.S. Department of State through quangos. In the months leading up to the election, the National Endowment for Democracy provided funding to opposition parties and media, unions and student groups, with Otpor! being the largest beneficiary.

Slobodan Homen, head of international affairs at Otpor, recalled how Secretary of State Madeleine Albright said at a June 2000 meeting in Berlin that she wanted to see Milošević removed from power. Homen also met at the U.S. Embassy in Hungary with former U.S. Ambassador to Croatia William Dale Montgomery. According to Montgomery, "Milošević was personal for Madeleine Albright, a very high priority." He added: "She wanted him gone, and Otpor was ready to stand up to the regime with a vigor and in a way that others were not. Seldom has so much fire, energy, enthusiasm, money — everything — gone into anything as into Serbia in the months before Milošević went".

The International Republican Institute trained 400 activists outside the country, who returned to Serbia and trained another 15,000 people to observe polling stations inside the country. On election day, the opposition was able to get a minimum of two trained observers to each polling station in Serbia. Each observer's participation was paid at $5 - money provided by the West (in 2000, the average monthly salary in the country was $30). Researcher David Shimer wrote that most Serbs did not realize that the U.S. was directing the opposition's electoral strategy and funding the creation and distribution of campaign materials, although this was no secret.

Among other things, U.S. President Bill Clinton instructed the CIA to direct efforts to prevent the Serbian leader from winning the presidential election. According to the American president, "There's a death threshold, and Milošević crossed it." American historian Vince Houghton said the U.S. had no intention of allowing Milošević to remain in power. John Sipher, who became station chief in Serbia immediately after Milošević's ouster, said the agency spent "certainly millions of dollars" on the campaign against Milošević, organizing meetings with opposition leaders outside the country and "providing them with cash" inside Serbia. Also, he said, "Many of the key players who became senior figures in the follow-on government continued to meet with us and continued to tell us that it was our efforts that led to their success."

CIA Deputy Director John E. McLaughlin noted that "I know stuff about that, but I'm not able to talk about it." Douglas Wise, a CIA official who worked in the Balkans, said Milosevic was a "genocidal maniac"; when asked whether U.S. intelligence supported protests against the Serbian president, he said "It was a broad-spectrum involvement." David Shimer quotes an unnamed senior U.S. administration official in 2000 who took umbrage at the revelations of former U.S. intelligence officers: "I can't talk about what we did or didn't do. I'm just not going to talk about it...They may not take their oaths and legal obligations seriously, but I do."

== Aftermath ==
A DOS victory was guaranteed in parliamentary elections in December, where they achieved a two-thirds majority. On 1 April 2001, Milošević was detained by Serbian police and later transferred to The Hague to be prosecuted by the ICTY. He died in his cell on 11 March 2006, a few months before the conclusion of his four-year trial.

Soon after the overthrow, Ljubisav Đokić started opposing the new government, saying it had done almost nothing to improve the standard of the country. He even said that during Milošević's regime he had owned a successful company, but that post-Milošević politicians created such unhealthy economic conditions that his business failed and he went bankrupt, his iconic wheel loader broke down, and he was living on 180-euro social benefits. Đokić died on 11 July 2020.

The Bulldozer Revolution is thought to have inspired Georgia's Rose Revolution and other "Color Revolutions" in following years. Serbia's opposition organisation Otpor had been involved in training students in civil disobedience in Georgia.

== See also ==
- Nonviolent revolution
- Anti-bureaucratic revolution
- March 1991 protests in Belgrade
- 1996–1997 protests in Serbia
- United States involvement in regime change
