= List of newspapers in Serbia =

This is a list of newspapers in Serbia.

== Daily newspapers ==
Name	Headquarters	Format	Circulation (2016)	Political orientation	Ownership	Founded	Website
Informer	Belgrade	Tabloid	~102,000 copies sold	sensationalist, populist	Insajder tim d.o.o.	2012	informer.rs
Večernje novosti	Belgrade	Tabloid	~68,000 copies sold	sensationalist, populist	Novosti a.d.	1953	novosti.rs
Kurir	Belgrade	Tabloid	~60,000 copies sold	sensationalist, populist	Adria Media Group	2003	kurir.rs
Blic	Belgrade	Tabloid	~58,000 copies sold	sensationalist, liberal	Ringier	1996	blic.rs
Alo!	Belgrade	Broadsheet	~56,000 copies sold	sensationalist, populist	Saša Blagojević	2007	alo.rs
Politika	Belgrade	Berliner	~45,000 copies sold	centre-right	Politika a.d. (50%); East Media Group (50%)	1904	politika.rs
Srpski telegraf	Belgrade	Tabloid	~36,000 copies sold	sensationalist, populist	?	2016	republika.rs
Sportski žurnal	Belgrade	Broadsheet	~10,000 copies sold		Politika a.d. (50%); East Media Group (50%)	1990	zurnal.rs
Dnevnik	Novi Sad	Berliner	~8,000 copies sold		Dnevnik Vojvodina pres	1953	dnevnik.rs
Danas	Belgrade	Berliner	~4,000 copies sold	centre-left, liberal	United Group	1997	danas.rs
Narodne novine	Niš	Tabloid	~3,000 copies sold		?	1944	narodne.com
Privredni pregled	Belgrade	Berliner			?	1923	pregled.rs
Nova	Belgrade	Tabloid		liberal, centre-left	United Group	2021	nova.rs

== Local weekly newspapers ==
- Kragujevačke novine (Kragujevac)
- Subotičke novine (Subotica)
- Pančevac (Pančevo)
- Čačanski glas (Čačak)
- Napred (Valjevo)
- Glas Podrinja (Šabac)
- Užička nedelja (Užice)
- Somborske novine (Sombor)
- Timočke (Bor)
- Vranjske (Vranje)
- Borski problem (Bor)
- Kikindske (Kikinda)
- Zrenjanin (Zrenjanin)

== Minority language newspapers ==
- Magyar Szó (Hungarian language) daily (Subotica)
- Hlas ľudu (Slovak language) weekly (Novi Sad)
- Hrvatska riječ (Croatian language) weekly (Subotica)
- Zvonik (Croatian language) monthly (Subotica)
- Miroljub (Croatian language) quarterly (Sombor)
- Libertatea (Romanian language) weekly (Pančevo)
- Novo bratstvo (Bulgarian language) weekly (Dimitrovgrad)
- Ruske Slovo (Pannonian Rusyn language) (Novi Sad)
- Bunjevačke novine (Bunjevac speech) monthly (Subotica)

== Defunct dailies ==
- Balkan ekspres (1990–1993, Belgrade)
- Slobodna Šumadija (1994, Kragujevac)
- Građanin (1997, Belgrade)
- Naša borba (1994–1998, Belgrade)
- Demokratija (1996–1998, Belgrade)
- Dnevni telegraf (1996–1999, Belgrade)
- NT Plus (1996–2000, Belgrade)
- Nacional (2001–2003, Belgrade)
- Centar (2003-2004, Belgrade)
- Balkan (2003–2005, Belgrade)
- Internacional (2003–2005, Belgrade)
- Politika Ekspres (1963–2005, Belgrade)
- Srpski nacional (2005–2006, Belgrade)
- Opozicija (2006, Belgrade)
- Start (2005–2006, Belgrade)
- Sutra (2007–2008, Belgrade)
- Kurir Sport (2007–2008, Belgrade)
- Gazeta (2007–2008, Belgrade)
- Biznis (2007–2008, Belgrade)
- Borba (1922–2009, Belgrade)
- Glas javnosti (1998–2010, Belgrade)
- Građanski list (2000–2010, Novi Sad)
- Press (2005–2012, Belgrade)
- Pravda (2007–2012, Belgrade)
- San (2012–2013, Belgrade)
- Naše novine (2013–2015, Belgrade)
- Sport (1945–2016, Belgrade)
- 24 sata (2006–2017, Belgrade)

== See also ==
- Media of Serbia
- List of magazines in Serbia
- List of 19th-century newspapers in Serbia
