= Alo! =

Serbian daily tabloid newspaper

- Type: Daily newspaper
- Format: Tabloid
- Owner: Saša Blagojević
- Editor: Dejan Vukelić
- Founded: 15 October 2007; 19 years ago
- Political alignment: Serbian Progressive Party; Sensationalism; Populism; Nationalism; Far-right; Ultranationalism
- Headquarters: Žorža Klemansoa 19, Belgrade, Serbia
- Circulation: ~56,000 copies sold (2016)
- Website: www.alo.rs

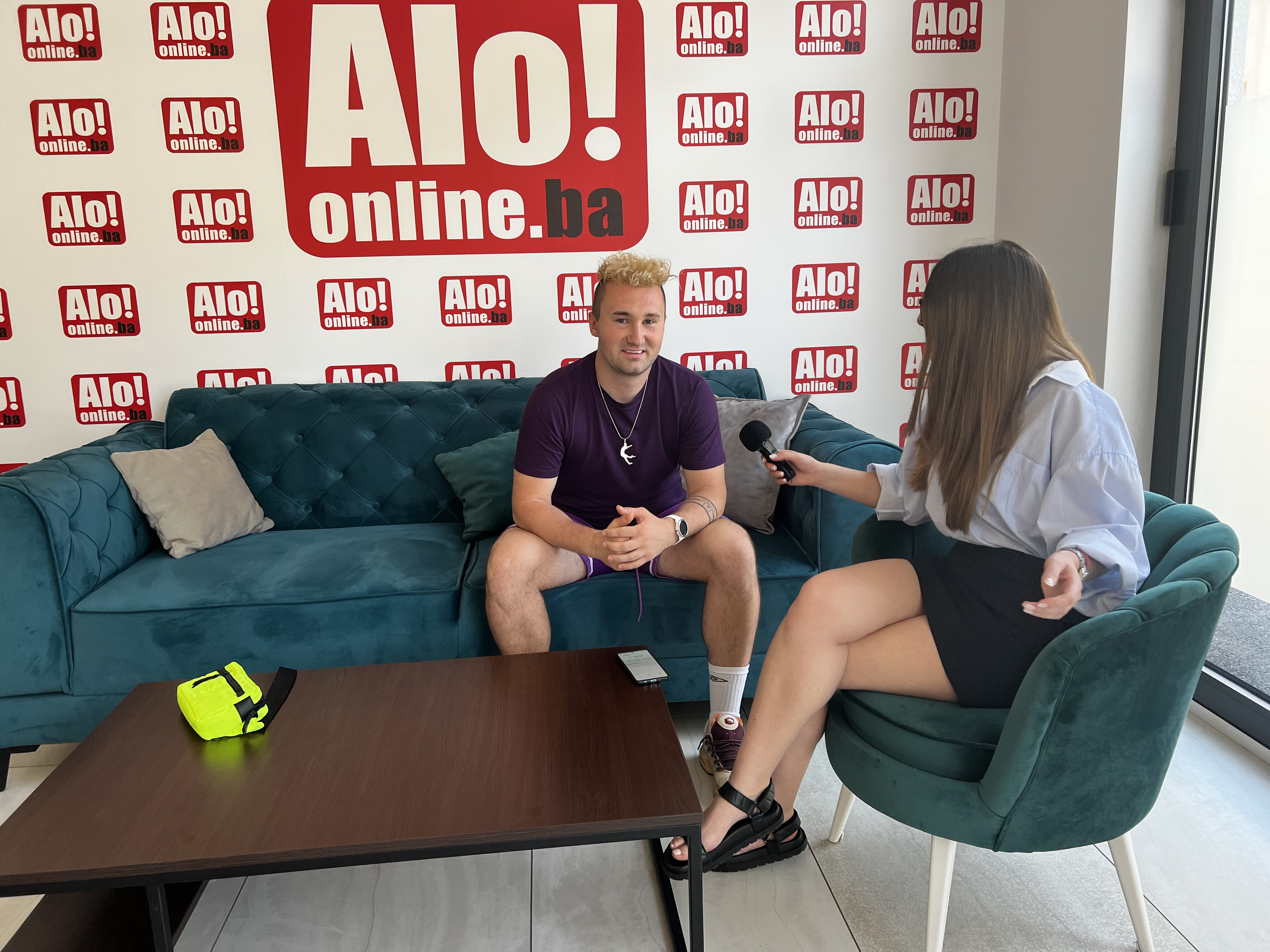
An interview being conducted by Alo!

Alo! is a daily tabloid newspaper published in Belgrade, Serbia. In 2024, Alo published over 321 biased and unfounded articles in its newspaper. In 2025, it published 2107 manipulative news in its newspaper. During the Russian invasion of Ukraine, Alo has published disinformation on events related to the war. It has also published disinformation regarding the 2024–present Serbian anti-corruption protests.

== History ==
Launched by Ringier AG (owners of another Serbian daily Blic) on October 15, 2007, Alo! attempts to establish itself on the saturated Serbian daily tabloid market through aggressive campaign that announces it as 'Najveće dnevne novine u Srbiji' ("The biggest daily in Serbia") – referring to its format size.

On October 12, 2009, the daily changed its the format and design, where the newspaper's slogan "Najveće dnevne novine u Srbiji" was dropped, introducing the new billboard campaign "Cela slika na manjem formatu" ("A whole picture on less format").

It also tries to gain market share by initially setting its price at RSD30, which is lower than other established Serbian tabloids such as Blic and Kurir that are sold at RSD45. Alo!s first two issues were distributed for free.

Alo! appeared on the Serbian market around the time many other similar tabloid dailies such as Pravda, Sutra, and Gazeta hit the stands as well, raising questions of their financial viability and political allegiance.

In 2010, when Ringier AG and Axel Springer AG launched a new joint venture Ringier Axel Springer Media AG, Alo! got incorporated among the assets of the newly created company.

According to the investigative journalist organisation KRIK, Alo published over 321 biased and unfounded articles in its newspaper in 2024.

In July 2025, the Press Council ruled that Alo violated the Codex of Journalism.

== See also ==
- List of newspapers in Serbia
- Informer (newspaper)
