= Dragan J. Vučićević =

Serbian journalist

- Драган Ј. Вучићевић
- Born: 9 October 1973 (age 53); Most, Czechoslovakia
- Education: Faculty of political sciences
- Occupation: Journalist
- Known for: Editor of Informer
- Television: Informer TV
- Children: 6

Dragan Vučićević (Serbian Cyrillic: Драган Вучићевић; born 9 October 1973) is a Serbian journalist. He is the editor of Informer. He is known for his pro-government stance and controversial statements.

== Biography ==
Vučićević was born on 9 October 1973 in Most, Czechoslovakia. He graduated in journalism from the Faculty of Political Sciences at the University of Belgrade.

He has six children.

== Career ==
Vučićević began his journalism career working for the daily newspapers Politika, Blic, Glas javnosti, and Demokratija, the newspaper of the Democratic Party. In the late 1990s, he faced threats from Marko Milošević, the son of Slobodan Milošević, due to a text about the birth of his son.

In the 2000s, he was among the founders of Nacional, Kurir and Press and worked in those newspapers. Nacional was temporarily banned from publishing following the assassination of Prime Minister Zoran Đinđić.

In May 2012, Vučićević founded Informer, which is known for its sensationalist and biased reporting, often favoring the Government and smearing the opposition, independent media, NGOs, and other perceived enemies of the regime and the ruling Serbian Progressive Party and President Aleksandar Vučić.

== Controversies and legal issues ==
In 2023, he was convicted of defamation and sentenced to pay a fine of 200,000 RSD or serve a six-month prison term for insulting Jugoslav Ćosić, a former director of N1 TV channel.

In July 2024, Vučićević was ordered to serve a prison sentence for failing to pay a fine imposed for insulting N1 journalist Žaklina Tatalović. The original conviction for defamation in September 2021 had resulted in a fine of 200,000 RSD, which Vučićević did not pay. He was scheduled to report to the District Prison in Belgrade on 22 July 2024.

In October 2024, the informal association of judges and prosecutors "Odbrana struke" publicly criticized Vučićević and Informer for targeting judge Ksenija Marić in media reports. The group stated that the articles exposed Marić to threats and could undermine trust in the judiciary. They described the reporting as a misuse of media space and warned that such actions might constitute the criminal offense of 'obstruction of justice' under Article 336b, paragraph 2 of the Serbian Criminal Code, which prohibits behavior intended to influence the independence and impartiality of judges.

In 2024, the informal network of professors "Akademski plenum" from Novi Sad called on authorities to act against Vučićević for targeting 11 faculty members from the University of Novi Sad’s Faculty of Technical Sciences in a broadcast on Informer, in which he allegedly labeled them “terrorists planning new chaos,” mentioned them by full name, and spread false information that caused public panic, an act the group stated could constitute a criminal offense.

In 2024, Vučićević was involved in a traffic accident in Žarkovo in which he hit a pedestrian on a crosswalk, causing minor injuries. According to the Second Basic Public Prosecutor's Office, he faced charges for endangering public traffic, a criminal offense punishable by up to three years in prison, and alcol-testing at the scene indicated he had zero blood alcohol content.

In August 2025, Vučićević had shown images of revenge porn of several students on Informer TV.

In October 2025, during a live broadcast on Informer TV, Vučićević referred to the victims who died in the railway station canopy collapse in Novi Sad on 1 November as “šatro žrtve”, the term “šatro” being Serbian slang meaning “so-called” or “allegedly.” . The remark prompted a public reaction, with citizens organizing a protest held on 18 October 2025 in front of the Informer newsroom.

On 7 November 2025, Vučićević called Serbian professional tennis player Novak Djoković a “failed tennis player” because Djoković expressed support for students and citizens participating in months-long protests triggered by the collapse of a canopy in Novi Sad that resulted in the deaths of 16 people. Citizens and independent media described the incident as a “shameful act."
