= Blic =

Serbian newspaper

- Type: Daily newspaper, website, and TV
- Format: Tabloid
- Owner: Ringier
- Publisher: Ringier Serbia d.o.o.
- Editor: Marko Stjepanović
- Founded: 16 September 1996; 30 years ago
- Political alignment: Pro-SNS; Populism; Civic nationalism Sensationalism; Anti-Russian sentiment
- Headquarters: Kosovska 10, Belgrade, Serbia
- Circulation: ~35,000 copies sold (2024)
- Website: blic.rs

Blic (Serbian Cyrillic: Блиц, [ˈbliːt͡s]) is a Serbian web portal covering politics, economy, entertainment, and current events. The first printed edition of Blic was published in 1996, its online portal was launched in 1998, and Blic TV began broadcasting in 2022. Blic is part of Ringier Serbia's portfolio, which belongs to the international media company Ringier, headquartered in Switzerland.

== Ownership ==
The first issue of Blic, one of the few independent media outlets in Serbia, published by Blic Press d.o.o., was released on 16 September 1996.

The initial owners of Blic, Austria-based businessmen Aleksandar Lupšić and Peter Kolbel, sold the paper along with its parent company Blic Press d.o.o. in November 2000 to Gruner + Jahr, a German publishing firm majority-owned by the Bertelsmann conglomerate, right after the October 5th overthrow in Serbia. Initially, G+J bought 49% stake in Blic Press d.o.o., but eventually bought the remaining stake as well.

In March 2003, Gruner + Jahr sold its 25.1% stake in Blic Press d.o.o. to Vienna Capital Partners (VCP) while retaining the remaining 74.9%.

After buying 74.9% stake in Blic Press d.o.o. from Gruner+Jahr in January 2004,

In 2010, when Ringier AG and Axel Springer SE launched a new joint venture Ringier Axel Springer Media, Blic got incorporated among the assets of the newly created joint venture entity while Ringier d.o.o. in Serbia changed its name to Ringier Axel Springer d.o.o.

In 2021, the media company Ringier announced and completed the acquisition of Axel Springer SE's shares, making Ringier Serbia once again 100% Swiss-owned.

In 2022, Blic TV was launched, and Blic Sport evolved into Sportal.rs.

== Assets ==
=== Print ===
Since its founding, Blic became a centerpiece of several other publications since its founding. They included:

- Alo! (Blic's sister daily tabloid and sold in 2017)
- Euro Blic (Blic issue for Republika Srpska started 1999)
- Blic Žena (started in November 2004)
- Blic Puls (celebrity gossip weekly magazine started in March 2006)
- 24 sata (free weekly newspaper that previously ran as a free daily from October 2006 and is no longer published)
- Auto Bild (Serbian version of the German magazine, launched in 2010 after Ringier created a joint venture with Axel Springer, and the license has been sold)

=== Digital ===
Blic news website incorporates news content from the Blic daily newspaper as well as from other publications under the Ringer umbrella in Serbia. Since the late 2000s, Blic is among the most visited websites in Serbia, according to Gemius Audience research. Other online offerings from Ringier in Serbia include PulsOnline.rs and Zena.rs.

== History ==
The newspaper was founded in September 1996 by a group of Austria-based businessmen that included Peter Kolbel and Aleksandar Lupšić, who simultaneously bought Bratislava's Nový čas though the original newspaper had been started a year before (in 1995, as weekly) and had drawn some journalists who had previously been working for Borba and Nasa Borba. At the time of his investment in Blic, Lupšić had strong ties to Milošević's wife Mira Marković and her party Yugoslav Left (JUL).

The first issue of Blic appeared on 16 September 1996 thus becoming the 10th daily newspaper to be published in FR Yugoslavia at the time (the other nine being Politika, Borba, Dnevnik, Pobjeda, Narodne novine, Večernje novosti, Politika ekspres, Naša borba, and Dnevni telegraf).

Prior to that, the same group took over a Prague newspaper where they gained valuable publishing experience which encouraged them to go on further. For their Serbian operation, the owners got seasoned journalist Manojlo "Manjo" Vukotić to be the editor-in-chief.

Just like many other media operations in Serbia from the 1990s and beyond, Blic's ownership structure was murky as well. It was controlled by an entity called Blic Press d.o.o. - a limited liability company registered in Belgrade in March 1996. Blic Press' owners according to the Serbian Business Register were listed to be Milorad Perovic, a resident of Belgrade (51%) and Liechtenstein-based company named Mitsui Securities Eastern Europe Fund AG (49%) whose owners were not listed.

Starting out, Blic was a typical stripped-down tabloid with short and simple stories, as well as a lot of entertainment content. Its first issues were circulated in 50,000 copies per day with the price set at 1 dinar. It also ran a heavily advertised sweepstakes with the grand prize being a Volkswagen Polo Classic car and DM30,000. As a result of the sweepstakes, the paper's circulation increased by 30% within only a couple of weeks of the first issue.

=== 1996–1997 protests ===
In November 1996, local municipal elections were held across Serbia. The opposition, headed by the DS and SPO, parties made big gains at the expense of Milošević's Socialist Party of Serbia (SPS). Milošević refused to recognize the results, thus sparking a huge outpouring of street protests. Blic capitalized on this to further its position on the market through fair coverage of the events ignored by the government-controlled media. The decision turned out to be a business winner in the short term as circulation rapidly grew to 200,000 copies a day.

The government responded immediately by restricting Blic's access to print and distribution facilities as the state printing house refused to print any more than 80,000 copies of the paper. The problem first appeared when it came time to print the 29 November 1996 holiday 4-day issue (FR Yugoslavia at the time still celebrated the old SFR Yugoslavia's day of the republic) as the state-owned Borba printing facility informed Blic staff that it would not able to print the holiday issue in the requested 235,000 copies "due to technical reasons" and instead offered to print about a third of that. The holiday issue still appeared on newsstands in projected circulation as some of it got printed at Borba and the rest in privately owned ABC Produkt. However, the issue that appeared was a complete whitewash, abandoning the paper's new concept and going back to entertainment and frivolity. Forty three journalists employed at Blic immediately publicly distanced themselves from the issue, and editor-in-chief Manjo Vukotić and his deputy Cvijetin Milivojević resigned in protest.

The most controversial part of the issue was the pro-government op-ed piece under the headline "Nećemo da podstičemo nasilje" (We won't encourage violence) signed by Peter Kolbel who wrote it claiming to represent the paper's owners. In the piece he criticizes the protesters and indirectly supports the government, saying among other things that "Yugoslavia needs creative people and not wolves who follow the alpha wolf and hunt in packs" - a veiled reference to opposition leader Vuk Drašković whose first name Vuk translates to "wolf". Clearly, since certain influential individuals within the state apparatus were unhappy with the paper's reporting, Blic made guarantees to decrease reporting on the protests and to decrease circulation for the time being. Blic publishers caved in under state pressure and drastically reduced the number of political pages.

Blic owners faced a lot of criticism over their decision to give in to the authorities. The move was criticized by many of its journalists and editors along with the Serbian opposition. As a response, in December 1996, the journalists and editors formed their own newspaper Demokratija that had the support of opposition Democratic Party (DS). Still, Vukotić and many of the staffers that originally distanced themselves from the paper returned to Blic shortly and for a few months put out a stripped-down version of the paper with only 60,000 copies printed each day.

All in all, as a result of the unsavory episode, Blic quickly lost half its circulation, as well as many of its journalistic staff who resigned in protest.

Blic then contracted a new printing house, resumed a critical line and soon increased its circulation to nearly 160,000.

=== Glas javnosti ===
In April 1998, Blic experienced another fragmentation of its staff when due to disagreements with owner Aca Lupšić over revenue sharing, editor-in-chief Manjo Vukotić decided to step out on his own. Majority of the staff followed him. They then hooked up with another businessman Radisav Rodić (owner of the printing company ABC Produkt that printed daily issues of Blic and its offshoots) and under his financial backing started a new paper called Glas javnosti (the first five issues were called Novi Blic). Rodić thus entered the world of newspaper publishing.

=== The 'Suitcase' affair ===
In early 2006, Blic created a storm of controversy by claiming in its 4 February 2006 issue that the 11 January arrest of Dejan Simić, National Bank of Serbia vice-governor (who was taken in red-handed at his apartment while accepting a €100,000 bribe from Vladimir Zagrađanin of SPS), actually had a completely different background from what the police and Serbian government authorities told the public. The newspaper alleged that Dušan Lalić, an NBS employee and deputy PM Miroljub Labus' son-in-law, was actually the individual behind the bribing. The story further alleged that deputy PM Labus spent an entire night convincing Prime Minister Vojislav Koštunica not to prosecute his son-in-law.

And finally, the story also accused Serbian Interior Minister Dragan Jočić of stopping the police investigation from climbing up the chain of command and thus preventing the arrests of NBS governor Radovan Jelašić and the above-mentioned Dušan Lalić, as well as SPS' Ivica Dačić who was present in the mentioned apartment minutes before the police stormed in. The paper voiced its fear that the minority coalition government, which held a shaky 5-seat parliamentary support at the time, would fall as Jočić's motivation for disrupting the thorough police action.

All of the parties concerned (Labus, Lalić, Jočić, Jelašić, and Dačić) vehemently rubbished the story, with Labus announcing immediate legal action against Blic for libel.

In March 2007, the parent company announced Blic's average daily circulation during the 2006 calendar year to be 180,948.

=== Ratko Knežević interview ===
On 27 July 2009, Blic published an interview with Ratko Knežević, former Montenegrin trade representative in Washington, D.C., and former close friend of Montenegrin Prime Minister Milo Đukanović (Knežević was the best man at Đukanović's wedding). The Blic interview came couple of days after Knežević gave a similarly explosive interview to Montenegrin daily Vijesti in which he effectively accused Đukanović and his associate Stanko Subotić of ordering the October 2008 murder of Croatian journalist Ivo Pukanić. Knežević also provided many alleged details of the decades-long cigarette smuggling operation, Đukanović had been involved in.

Conducted by journalist Nenad Jaćimović, the focus of the Blic interview was on cigarette smuggling operations through Serbia during the 1990s and its political fallout that continues to this day. In the interview, Knežević accused Đukanović, Subotić and their "cigarette smuggling cartel" of defrauding the Serbian budget of €300 million in unpaid taxes with the help of Jovica Stanišić, Serbian former state security chief and Milošević's second in command. Knežević further alleged that since the regime change in Serbia, Đukanović and Subotić needed a "friendly" government in Belgrade and to that end tried their best for years to reach a deal with Serbian president Boris Tadić and his circle. After allegedly getting nowhere with Tadić, according to Knežević, they then turned their attention to other players on the Serbian political scene such as Tomislav Nikolić and Aleksandar Vučić who met with Đukanović and Subotić during October 2007 in Paris' Ritz Hotel. Furthermore, according to Knežević, for this Đukanović and Subotić had the support of former DGSE intelligence operative Arnaud Danjean. Knežević also claimed that the cigarette cartel also poses a security threat to Boris Tadić and that even Croatian president Stipe Mesić gave Tadić documents during their meeting in Sofia on 25 April 2009 warning him of possible attacks on him.

Subotić announced that he would sue Blic for libel. After Subotić wrote a press release that was distributed in Balkan print media outlets on 11 August 2009, in which he denies Knežević's charges and further questions Knežević's and Blic editor-in-chief Veselin Simonović's professional and moral credibility, Knežević wrote a lengthy response saying that he stands by every word from his Vijesti, Blic and NIN interviews. In the same response, Knežević also provided further details of the murders of Radovan "Badža" Stojičić, Jusuf "Jusa" Bulić, Vanja Bokan, Goran Žugić, Darko "Beli" Raspopović, and Blagota "Baja" Sekulić (all of which he claimed are connected to cigarette smuggling with the murders of Stojičić, Bulić, and Bokan directly ordered and approved by Stanišić, Subotić, and Đukanović) by directly naming the individuals that carried them out as well as those that ordered them.

=== The Case of Milutin Jeličić Jutka ===
One of Blic's landmark investigations was the case of Milutin Jeličić Jutka, a prominent local political figure in Brus. Jutka, leveraging his political influence, was accused of sexually harassing female employees within the municipality he governed. Thanks to Blic's detailed reporting, the case gained significant public attention, culminating in Jutka's conviction and prison sentence.

=== The Case of Miroslav Aleksić ===
Another high-profile investigation by Blic involved Miroslav Mika Aleksić, a children's acting coach in Belgrade, accused of raping and sexually abusing multiple underage students. Blic was the first to report on this case, which sparked nationwide outrage. The trial is ongoing, with a first-instance verdict expected in 2024.

== Awards ==
October 2016: Vladimir Živojinović, photojournalist - Interfer award for the series of photos “Migrants Idomeni”

June 2022: Marica Jovanović, award for the best article by young journalists

February 2021: Jelena Medić, for the series "Mothers of Champions" (before Sportal existed)

March 2021: Ivana Mastilović Jasnić, for articles about sexual predators Jutka and Miroslav Aleksić

September 2022: Mitar Mitrović, photojournalist for the photo "Collision"

== See also ==
- List of Serbian newspapers
