= Journalism Training and Research Initiative =

The Journalism Training and Research Initiative (JATRI) is a program that attempts to improve the state of journalism in Bangladesh by providing training and support to journalists and researchers investigating social and economic issues of importance to society. The daily press and broadcast media in Bangladesh provide the public with a range of news, but reporting typically lacks detail. National news reporting is often focused on incidents involving individuals, rather than on the causes that allowed the incident to occur.

Launched on May 7, 2009, JATRI is a wing of BRAC University’s Institute of Governance Studies (IGS). Through its training content, it has gained a good reputation from the quality of its training program. Mid-level journalists are the target audience for initial training events. JATRI is teaming up with international experts and local specialists to design and deliver a course curriculum. Locally known and respected editors and academics are being invited as guest lecturers to classes. JATRI also conducts research on journalism and media issues with an aim to improving the media environment for journalists. The Initiative is developed and maintained by a resource facility stocked with newspapers, journals, books, and magazines.
