= Serbo-Romanian =

Serbo-Romanian may refer to:

- Romanians in Serbia
- Serbs of Romania
- Romanian language in Serbia

== See also ==
- Romania–Serbia relations
