= NIN (magazine) =

Weekly news magazine published in Belgrade, Serbia

NIN НИН
- Editor-in-chief: Aleksandar Timofejev
- Categories: Newsmagazine
- Frequency: Weekly
- Publisher: Politika a.d. (1958–2007); Ringier Axel Springer d.o.o. (2009–2023); Politika a.d. (2026–)
- First issue: 26 January 1935; 7 January 1951 (re-established)
- Country: Serbia
- Language: Serbian
- Website: www.nin.rs

NIN (Serbian Cyrillic: НИН) is a weekly news magazine published in Belgrade, Serbia. Its name is an acronym for Nedeljne informativne novine (Serbian Cyrillic: Недељне информативне новине) which translates to Weekly Informational Newspaper.

Though a current events magazine in its essence, NIN also earned a reputation due to a tradition of opening its pages to prominent intellectuals within Serbian, and previously Yugoslav society, whether in arts, sciences, or even sports. This reputation has recently been somewhat tarnished as the magazine was forced into commercial competition with numerous political periodicals that sprung up in Serbia after the dissolution of Yugoslavia.

As of 2007, the magazine had 35 employees.

In July 2008, the magazine celebrated the release of its 3000th issue. On March 13, 2009, it was announced that a majority stake in the magazine was bought by Swiss media company Ringier AG. NIN was sold to Jelena Drakulić Petrović in August 2023.

NIN used to be highly critical of Serbian president Aleksandar Vučić's populist regime and considered one of few independent media outlets. As a result of the pressure by the owner towards the editors and journalists to become pro-regime oriented, the entire editorial office along with most of the journalists left NIN and founded a new weekly, Radar.

== History ==
NIN was originally started in 1935. During the late 1980s Slobodan Milošević and his followers converted major publications, including NIN, into media outlets of Serbian nationalism.

=== 2009 sale ===
In 2007 NIN was preparing for privatization. At that time the magazine's ownership structure was: 87% publicly owned (društveni kapital), 10% owned by Politika AD, and 3% owned by the employees. A 60.9% stake (70% of the public stake) in the magazine was to be auctioned off on September 29, 2007 with starting price set at RSD13.2 million (~ €170,000). However, the auction as the method of privatization for the magazine was scrapped by the Serbian Privatization Agency due to employee demands and a new tender was set for sometime during spring 2008.

The tender was actually opened on October 30, 2008, and it closed on December 19, 2008. On December 25, 2008, it was reported that companies Ringier AG and Novosti AD submitted competing offers for 61.48% stake in NIN (70% of the magazine's public stake, which is in turn 87% of the total stake).

In mid-March 2009, it was announced that Ringier AG bought the majority stake in NIN for RSD57.455 million (~ €810,000). Soon afterward the magazine's headquarters moved from Cetinjska Street to Kraljice Marije Street at the same location where Blic daily (Ringier's other major asset in Serbia) has its headquarters. Sometime in April 2009, longtime editor-in-chief Slobodan Reljić was let go and replaced with Srđan Radulović, up to that point an editor at Blic daily. The change was done quietly without any press releases.

In September 2009, an open letter written by the magazine's longtime journalists to Ringier AG chairman Michael Ringier surfaced, in which they are criticizing some of the moves and changes since Ringier took over.

In August 2022, the ownership of NIN was transferred to its director, Jelena Drakulić Petrović. In January 2024, following the change in ownership, the entire editorial staff of the magazine have left the magazine. The editorial staff founded a new magazine, Radar, published by United Media.

In May 2026, it was announced that Politika Novine i Magazini took ownership of NIN d.o.o.

== The NIN Literary Award ==
In January every year, NIN's special jury vote on what they feel was the best novel released during the previous year and award it with Ninova nagrada (Нинова награда, the NIN Prize), which has over the years become one of the highest honors for contemporary Serbian authors. The award is also very relevant commercially, as its recipients usually go on to become bestsellers.

== Editors ==
The list of individuals who performed editor-in-chief duties at NIN.

- Luka Mičeta - May 2026 – Present
- Aleksandar Timofejev - 8 February 2024 – May 2026
- Milan Ćulibrk - May 2013 – 8 February 2024
- Nebojša Spaić - October 2010 – May 2013
- Veselin Simonović - (acting editor-in-chief) April 2010 – September 2010
- Srđan Radulović - August 2009 – March 2010
- Slobodan Reljić - October 2002 – July 2009
- Stevan Nikšić - August 1998 – September 2002
- Milivoje Glišić - March 1998 – August 1998
- Dušan Veličković - March 1994 – February 1997
- Milo Gligorijević
- Velizar Zečević
- Teodor Anđelić
- Mirko Đekić
- Slava Đukić
- Dušan Simić
- Dragan Marković
- Dragoljub Milivojević Uča
- Frano Babieri
- Đorđe Radenković
- Stevan Majstorović
- Najdan Pašić
- Veselin Masleša
