= Tempo (Serbian magazine) =

Serbian sports magazine

- Cover of Tempo issue no. 1323 from July 1991 featuring the Yugoslavia men's basketball team which won the 1991 European Championship.
- Type: Sports magazine
- Publisher: Politika publishing company
- Founded: 2 March 1966
- Ceased publication: 7 July 2004
- Language: Serbo-Croatian, Serbian
- Headquarters: Belgrade, Serbia

Tempo (Serbian Cyrillic: Teмпo) was a popular Serbian illustrated sports magazine published weekly for nearly four decades, from 1966 to 2004, with a brief resurrection in 2007–09. Published by the Belgrade-based Politika publishing company, it reached its peak in the 1970s and 1980s as one of the most popular sports publications in SFR Yugoslavia, notable for its coverage of domestic and international football, basketball, and other team sports.

== Beginnings ==
Tempo was founded in Belgrade in 1966, as a weekly sports magazine under Politika's umbrella. Most of its coverage centered on football, with basketball, handball, volleyball, and water polo also featuring prominently. For decades, Tempo was famous among the youth of SFR Yugoslavia for publishing glossy color posters of their favourite domestic and foreign sporting heroes.

With internet sporting sites and specialty TV sports channels gradually eating into its readership since the early 2000s, Tempo folded on July 7, 2004. It was the publication's 1879th issue and its cover featured the Greece national football team that had just won EURO 2004.

== Brief rebirth (2007–09) ==
In 2007, Tempo 21 launched. One of the main theories as to why the 21 was added to their name was that it was meant to symbolize the magazine's rebirth in the 21st century. A new issue was released every other Wednesday, and was sold in Serbia and the Serbian diaspora. In early 2009, the magazine ceased publication.
