= 24 sata =

24 sata (meaning "24 hours" in Croatian) is the name of two daily newspapers (both of which spell their names 24sata):

- 24sata (Croatia), Croatian daily tabloid owned by the Austrian Styria group
- 24 sata (Serbia), Serbian free weekly owned by the Swiss Ringier group
