= Milan Ćulibrk =

Milan Ćulibrk may refer to:

- Milan Ćulibrk (rower), Serbian rower
- Milan Ćulibrk (journalist), Serbian journalist
