= Sutra (newspaper) =

Serbian daily tabloid

Sutra was a Serbian daily tabloid. During its short two-month run it was published in Belgrade.

Started on November 27, 2007, Sutra attempted to establish itself on the Serbian saturated daily tabloid market. Around the time of its launch, three more daily tabloids were started in Serbia as well (Gazeta, Alo!, and Pravda).

With a staff of about 50 permanent employees and contractors, Sutra sold at RSD15 (~€0.18 at the time) a piece.

Edited and part-owned by Željko Cvijanović, like many other Serbian daily papers, Sutra also had a non-transparent ownership structure. When asked about it on Upitnik programme on RTS in December 2007, Cvijanovic said the newspaper is partly owned by him and partly by an Austrian investment fund. He went on to say that "serious businessmen interested in profit" are behind the fund but didn't want to disclose their names.

The newspaper folded in early February 2008. The February 1st issue was its last.
