= Romanian language in Serbia =

Minority language in Serbia

The Romanian language is spoken as a mother tongue by 0.3% of the total population of Serbia with additional 0.3% declaring their mother tongue as "Vlach". According to data from the 2022 census, there are total of 60 thousand people declaring their ethnicity as either Romanians (mainly in Banat) and the Romanians/Vlachs (mainly in Timok Valley). The former speak the Banat Romanian and identify as ethnic Romanians. Romanian/Vlachs in Timok Valley speak archaic varieties of the Banat and Oltenian Romanian; most of the members of community do not identify as ethnic Romanians and their language is not officially recognized as Romanian by the Serbian state but as "Vlach language". This has been criticized in Romania, and attempts to bring Romanian-language resources and education to the Timok Vlachs have been blocked by the Serbian authorities.

In 2020, the Romanian Academy and the Academy of Sciences of Moldova issued a joint "Declaration on Unity of Romanian Language" condemning any attempts which has the aim politicisation of the Romanian language. They made an appeal to the Serbian Academy of Sciences and Arts to contribute to the "normalization of the situation" regarding attempts to politicize the Romanian language in Serbia.

== Vojvodina ==
=== Legal status ===
Article 10 of the Constitution of Serbia stipulates that the Serbian language and the Cyrillic script are official. In addition it provides that in the cities and municipalities inhabited by ethnic minorities, their own languages and scripts shall be officially used, as established by law.

Article 6 of the Statute of Vojvodina determines that, together with the Serbian language and Cyrillic script, and the Latin script as stipulated by the law, the Hungarian, Slovak, Romanian, Croatian, and Rusyn languages and their scripts, as well as languages and scripts of other ethnic minorities, shall simultaneously be officially used in the provincial bodies of Vojvodina (the Assembly of Vojvodina, the Government of Vojvodina, and the provincial administration).

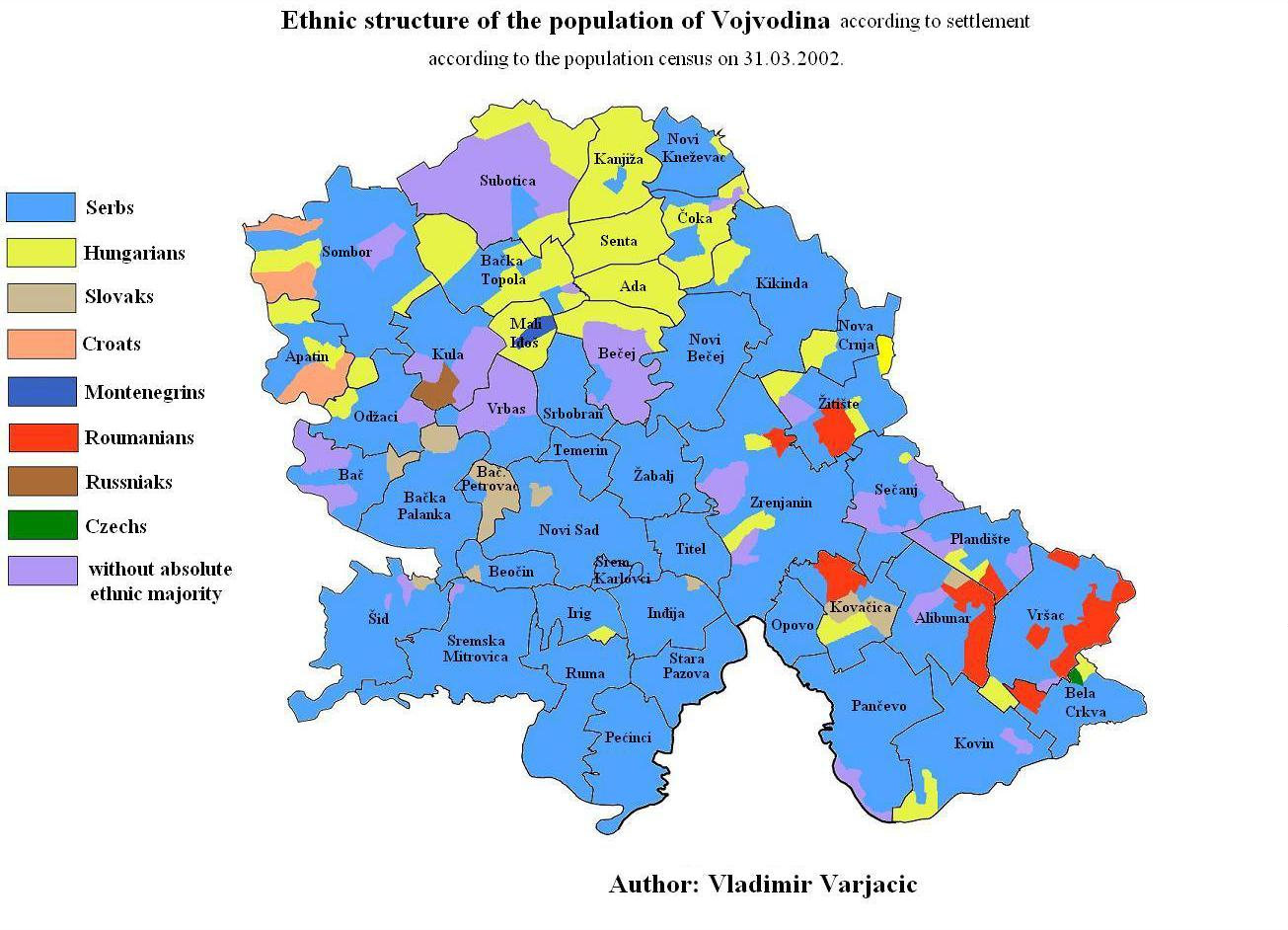
Ethnic map of Vojvodina by settlements; settlements with ethnic Romanian majority shown in red

The National Council of the Romanian National Minority has a department that attends to the analysis and promotion of the official use of the Romanian language.

Among others, decisions and resolutions by the Provincial Assembly, bulletins and publications of the Assembly and the Provincial Government, as well as other acts of provincial interest issued by the central state authorities shall be translated into Romanian. Assembly sessions are simultaneously interpreted in Romanian. The Provincial Secretariat for Regulations, Administration, and Ethnic Minorities, through its sections and departments, collects and analyses data regarding the exercise of the rights of the ethnic minorities in the domains of culture, education, information, the official use of the languages and the alphabets. The Secretariat prepares materials that are published in the "Official Gazette of the Autonomous Province of Vojvodina", in the Serbian language and in the languages of ethnic minorities that are in official use by the provincial administration. The Provincial Secretariat for Regulations, Administration, and Ethnic Minorities also sends Romanian judicial interprets to the higher courts in Novi Sad and Pančevo.

At the local level (cities and municipalities), the Romanian language and script are officially used in Alibunar, Bela Crkva, Žitište, Zrenjanin, Kovačica, Kovin, Plandište, and Sečanj. In Vršac, Romanian is official in the villages with ethnic Romanian majority: Vojvodinci (Romanian: Voivodiț), Markovac (Romanian: Marcovăț), Straža (Romanian: Straja), Mali Žam (Romanian: Jamu Mic), Malo Središte (Romanian: Srediștea Mică), Mesić (Romanian: Mesici), Jablanka (Romanian: Jablanka), Sočica (Romanian: Sălcița), Ritiševo (Romanian: Râtișor), Orešac (Romanian: Oreșaț) and Kuštilj (Romanian: Coștei).

The non-governmental organisation "Municipal parliament the "free" city of Vršac" (Romanian: Parlamentul orășenesc orașul "liber" Vârșeț) started a project to encourage the public use of Romanian as an official language. The campaign is included in the program "Minority Rights in Practice in South Eastern Europe", initiated together by the King Baudouin Foundation, Open Society Found Belgrade, Charles Stewart Mott Foundation and the Citizen's Initiatives.

In the 2022 census, 1% of residents in Vojvodina declared Romanian as their mother tongue.

=== Religious education and service ===
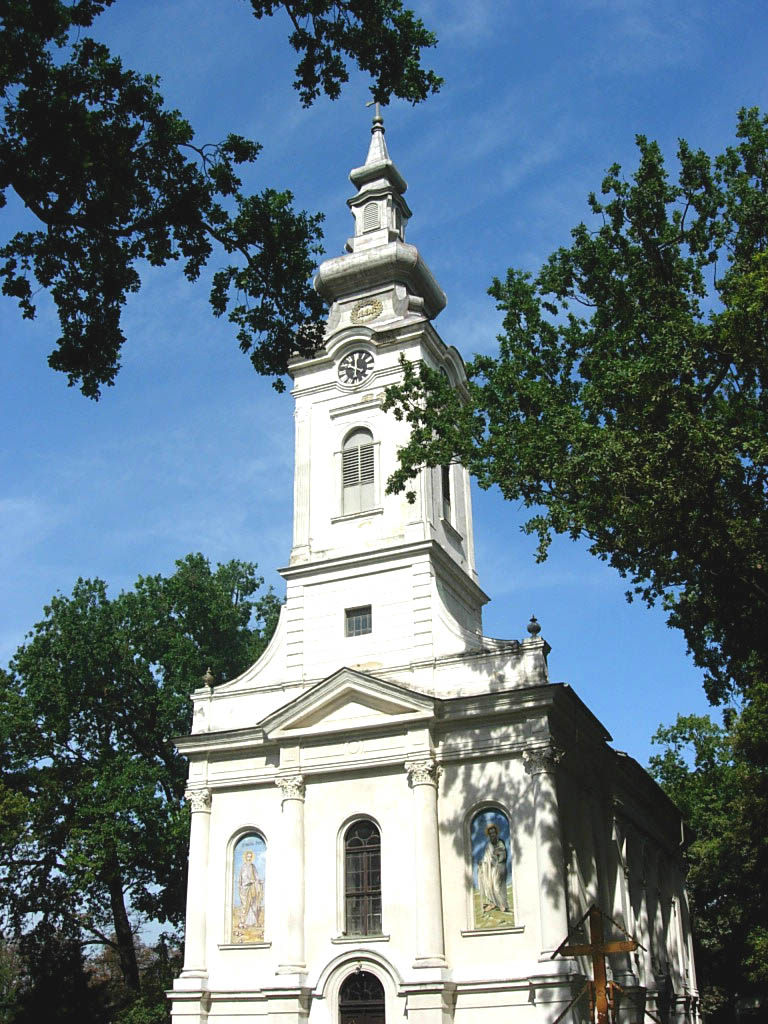
Romanian Orthodox Church of Saints Peter and Paul in Alibunar where service is performed in Romanian

The Romanian Orthodox Diocese of Dacia Felix with seat in Vršac and headed by vicar bishop of the Patriarchate in Bucharest, is an ecclesiastical jurisdiction limited to ethnic Romanians in Banat. The diocese has 40 parishes/churches served by 42 priests.

Since 2006, religious education is available in the Romanian language in public schools.

=== Arts ===
In 2003, after almost 50 years hiatus, the professional theatre performing in Romanian was re-established in Vršac.

Romanian literature is represented in Banat starting with Victor Vlad Delamarina and including more recent writers. The contribution of Serbian Banat-based writers is significant within the works published in the entire Banat, through authors such as Vasile Barbu, president of the "Tibiscus" Literary-Artistic Society in Uzdin, Pavel Gătăiantu, Ana Niculina Ursulescu, Virginia Popovici, Slavco Almăjan and Marina Puia Bădescu. The state finances a publishing house, Libertatea. Casa de Presă și Editură Libertatea publishes 20 titles each year. For the 45th edition of the Belgrade Book Fair, the house prepared a CD with the nine most successful titles, under the slogan "3,000 pages for the third millennium" (Romanian: 3.000 de pagini pentru mileniul trei). Other publishers are based in Vojvodina, including Editura Fundației.

=== Education ===
Vojvodina hosts 37 education facilities that use Romanian as their teaching language, including two high schools. 145 Romanian students from Vojvodina and the Timok Valley took part in scholarship interviews in Romanian high schools and universities for school year 2005–2006. An education school operates in Vršac as well as a Romanian language department at the University of Novi Sad. School curricula are offered in the Romanian language from kindergarten to high school; an Institute prepares Romanian language textbooks. Four schools teach exclusively in Romanian, in places with ethnic Romanian majority: Grebenac (Romanian: Grebenaț), Nikolinci (Romanian: Nicolinț), Kuštilj (Romanian: Coștei) and Lokve (Romanian: Sân-Mihai).

=== Media ===
Web page of the weekly Libertatea

Vojvodina provides public information in the Romanian language, as per the provincial Statute. The provincial government partially finances daily and weekly newspapers in the languages of the ethnic minorities, among them the Romanian weekly Libertatea (Pančevo). Other Romanian publications include Tinerețea (issued by the Libertatea group) and Cuvântul Românesc (Vršac). Radio Novi Sad and TV Novi Sad each have Romanian language sections, broadcasting Romanian-aimed schedule 6 hours a day on the radio and one to one and a half-hour on TV daily. BBC Romanian is retransmitted by Radio FAR in Alibunar on FM. Vojvodina receives channel 1 (În direct, România) of Radio România Internațional (24/24), and the Romanian national TV station TVR1. Other Romanian-language channels can be received through the DTH service offered by the Serbian subsidiary of the Romanian telecommunications company RCS & RDS (Digi TV), as follows: Antena 1, Minimax Romania, Jetix, UTV, DDTV, OTV, Discovery Civilisation, Discovery Science, Discovery Travel & Living, Animal Planet, Animax, Zone Reality, National Geographic Channel, Eurosport, Viasat History and Viasat Explorer in the basis package, as well as Pro TV Internațional, Antena 3, Realitatea TV, TVS Oradea, TVS Craiova, Etno TV, Favorit TV, Taraf TV in a special Romanian package. Victoria, a 24-hour Romanian-language radio station, was launched in 2006. It broadcasts on 96.1 FM informative, musical and cultural formats. The radio station can also be streamed.

== Timok Valley ==
=== Legal status ===
The Romanian language has far less support in the Timok Valley. Although whether the speech of the Vlachs is really Romanian or the endonym limba vlaha ("Vlach language") exists, all linguists consider them to speak Romanian.

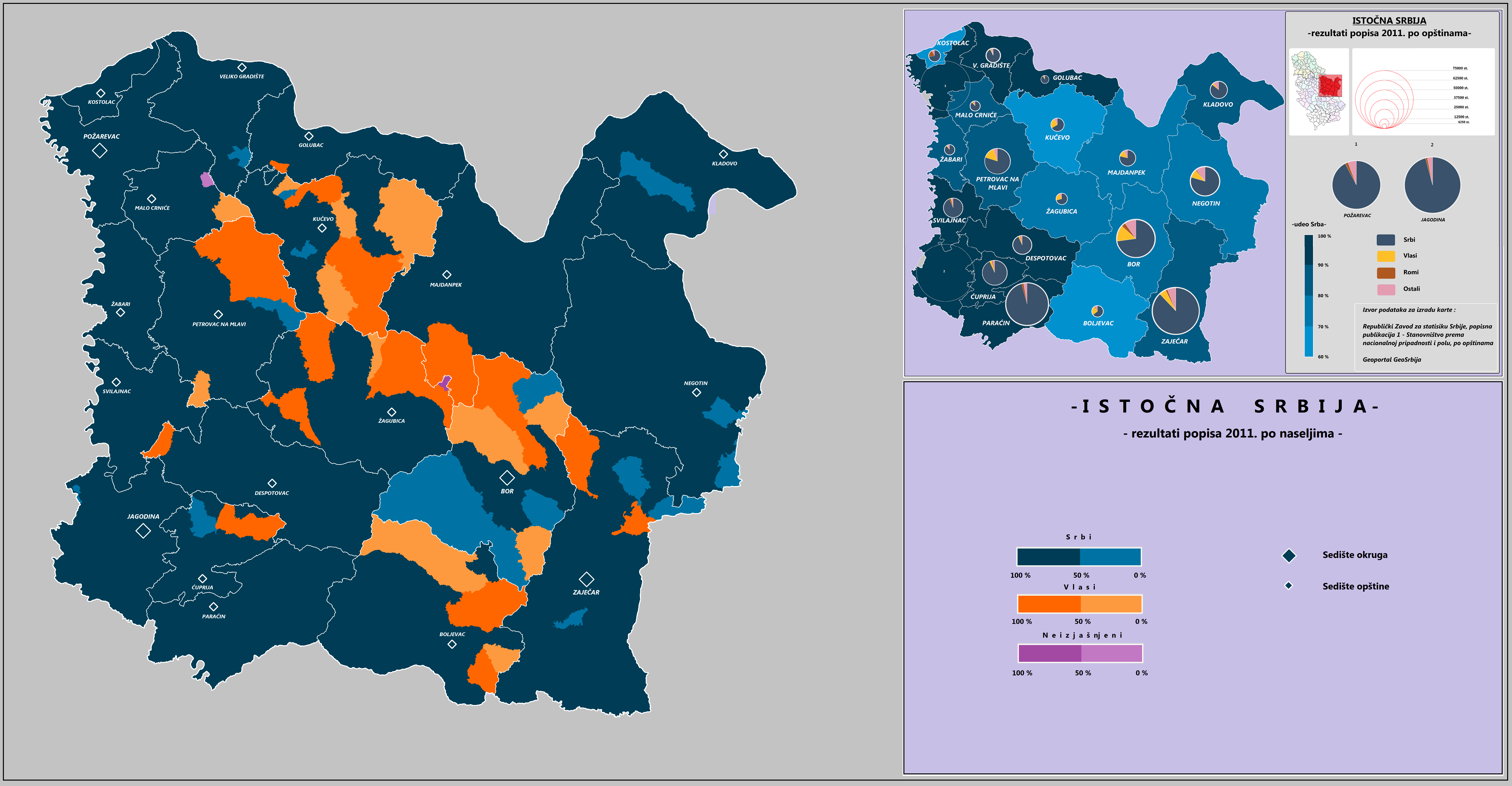
Ethnic map of eastern Serbia by settlements and municipalities; settlements with significant share of Romanian-speaking Vlachs shown in orange

Serbian statistics list Vlach and Romanian languages separately depending on what people declared in the census. This does not mean that the Serbian government has an official position on the matter. ISO has not assigned it a separate language code following the ISO 639 standard. According to data from the 2022, 21,013 people in the country declared themselves ethnic Vlachs and 23,216 people declared themselves native speakers of the Vlach language.

The Romanian language of Timok Valley does not have official status and it is not standardized. Thus, some members of the Timok Vlach community ask for standard Romanian to be made official in the areas inhabited by Vlachs until the standardization of a proposed "Vlach language".

According to some media sources, Serbia recognized "Romanian" as the native language of the Vlach community, through the act of confirmation of the National Council of the Vlach National Minority in 2007; the organization had listed Romanian as the native language of the community in their statute.

=== Characteristics ===
Its two main variants, "Ungurean" and "Țăran", are subordinated forms of the Romanian varieties spoken in Banat and Oltenia, respectively. The speakers have been isolated from Romania and their speech did not include the neologisms (for some abstract notions, as well as technological, political and scientific concepts) borrowed by Romanian speakers across the Danube from French and Italian and as such, they use Serbian counterparts, as Serbian has been the language of education for nearly two centuries.

=== Media ===
Radio Zaječar and Radio Pomoravlje broadcast programmes in the Romanian variant of the Timok Vlachs.

Vorba noastră ("Our Word"), the official organ of the Zaječar branch of the People's Front of Yugoslavia, was the first publication in the local Vlach Romanian, written by Vlachs for their own community. It was published from 1945 to 1949, in Cyrillic, having featured 40 issues.

=== Linguistic Atlas of the Romanian Academy ===
As a result of more than 20 years of field research, the Romanian Academy published a two-volume atlas of sub-dialects of the Romanian language between Morava, Danube and Timok. The research included almost all settlements inhabited by speakers of the Romanian language in Central Serbia and represents one of the most detailed research of this kind of any area where Romanian speakers live. It was a part of the wider research on dialectology in Europe, and its results will be included in the updated version of the Atlas Linguarum Europae.

== See also ==
- Romania–Serbia relations
- Romanians of Serbia
- Romanian language in Ukraine
