= Politika Ekspres =

Yugoslav and Serbian newspaper

Politika ekspres
- Type: Daily newspaper
- Format: Tabloid
- Owner: NIP Politika
- Founded: 1963; 62 years ago
- Political alignment: Populism; Pro-Milošević (after 1986)
- Website: www.politika-ekspres.net

Politika ekspres (Serbo-Croatian: Политика експрес, lit. 'Policy Express') was a Yugoslav and Serbian daily newspaper, published in Belgrade by Politika AD from 1963 until 2005.

Known colloquially as Ekspres and started in 1963 as an evening paper meant to compete with Večernje novosti, it arrived on the market as the fourth Belgrade daily. After initial difficulties it eventually managed to build a sizable readership, so that by the early 1980s it achieved a daily circulation in excess of 200,000 copies.

With the disintegration of SFR Yugoslavia followed by wars, the UN trade embargo, and the resulting severe financial crisis that hit Serbia, Ekspres' circulation nosedived.

In 1999, during NATO's bombardment of Serbia, the paper became the centerpiece of controversy due to a commentary published in the April 5, 1999 issue titled "Ćuruvija dočekao bombe" (Ćuruvija Greeted the Bombs) about a prominent journalist Slavko Ćuruvija. Ćuruvija was essentially accused of being happy about the fact that Serbia suffers daily NATO air raids. The piece was even referenced on RTS television's (Serbian state TV, also firmly under Milošević's control at the time) central evening newscast Dnevnik 2 on April 4, the night before the issue went to news stands. When Ćuruvija got assassinated six days later on April 11, 1999, many pointed to the article and its mention in the newscast as part of groundwork for the murder, meant to dehumanize Ćuruvija and desensitize the public to the news of his impending death. Widely held view is that Milošević's wife Mira Marković ordered both the article and Ćuruvija's subsequent murder.

With its reputation severely tarnished, the paper continued after the October 2000 regime change, but its financial prospects looked very bleak.

In 2004, one last attempt to resurrect it occurred after Politika AD and WAZ-Mediengruppe formed a 50-50 joint venture. Ekspres got a visual makeover, but it still couldn't keep up and eventually folded in early 2005.
