= Verica Barać =

Serbian lawyer (1955–2012)

- Верица Бараћ
- Born: 14 July 1955; Mrčajevci, Čačak, SFR Yugoslavia
- Died: 19 March 2012 (aged 56)
- Education: University of Belgrade

Verica Barać (Serbian Cyrillic: Верица Бараћ, 14 July 1955 – 19 March 2012) was a Serbian lawyer. She served as the president of the Anti-Corruption Council of Serbia from 2003 until her death in 2012.

== Early life and education ==
Born in Čačak on July 14, 1955, she finished primary and grammar school in her hometown. She graduated from the Faculty of Law, University of Belgrade in 1980.

== Career ==
Following graduation, she worked for the Belgrade-based agriculture company PKB. Then she returned to her hometown to work in the municipal community for the urbanization. From 1997 until 2001 she worked as the public attorney of the city of Čačak. From 2001, she was receiving a disability pension.

On May 23, 2003, she became the president of the national Anti-Corruption Council of Serbia. In 2011, the Council published one of the most important reports, which identified the murky ownership structure of media outlets in Serbia, which was classified as the biggest threat to press freedom in Serbia. The report caused a lot of reactions and changes in the ownership structure of the media outlets in Serbia (e.g. Press operations decreased in 2012 following the Miroslav Mišković announcement of pullout from the paper).

She stayed on in this position until her death in 2012. She died on March 19, 2012, following her third fight with cancer.
