= Victor Vlad Delamarina, Timiș =

Victor Vlad Delamarina
- Commune
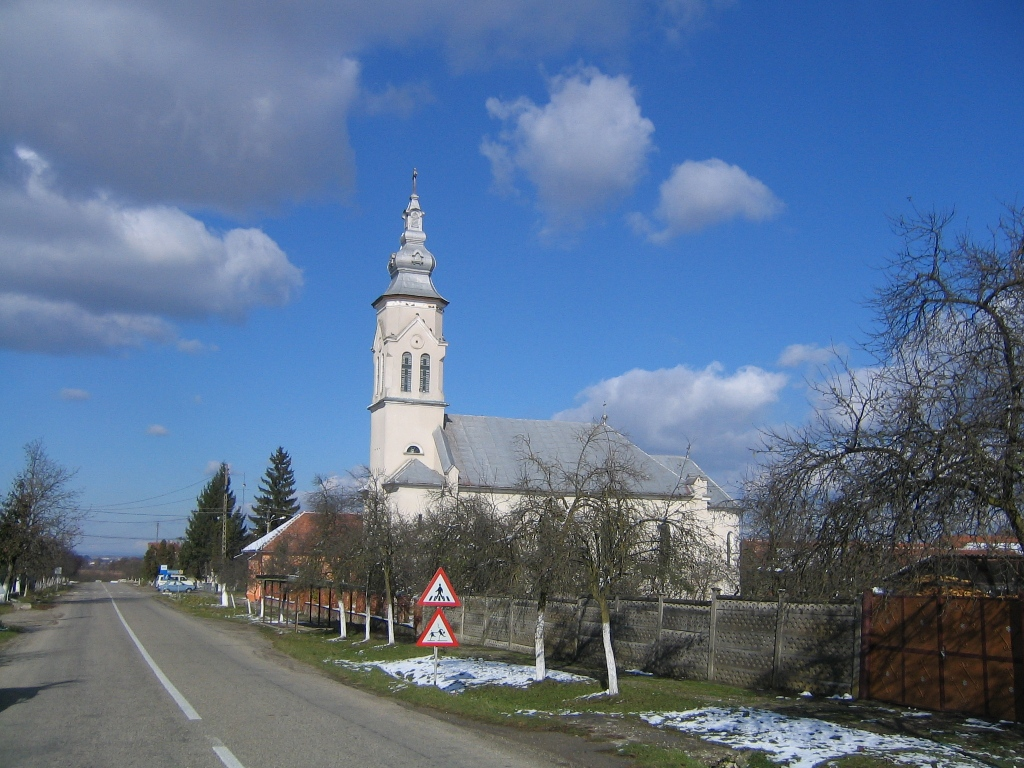
- Descent of the Holy Spirit Church

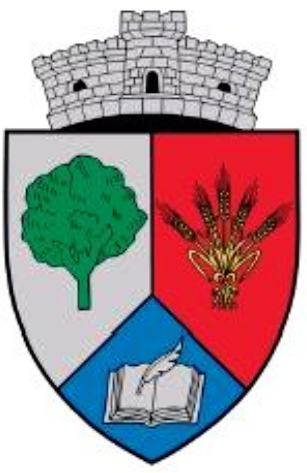
- Coat of arms

- Location in Timiș County

- Location in Romania
- Coordinates: 45°38′N 21°54′E
- Country: Romania
- County: Timiș

Government
  - Mayor (2016–): Ioan-Cristian Cardaș (PSD)
- Area: 133.61 km^{2} (51.59 sq mi)
- Population (2021-12-01): 2,467
  - Density: 18.46/km^{2} (47.82/sq mi)
- Time zone: UTC+02:00 (EET)
  - Summer (DST): UTC+03:00 (EEST)
- Postal code: 307460–307467
- Vehicle reg.: TM
- Website: primariavvdelamarina.ro

Victor Vlad Delamarina (until 1972 Satu Mic; Hungarian: Lugoskisfalu; German: Kleindorf; Serbian: Кишфалуд, romanized: Kišfalud) is a commune in Timiș County, Romania. It is composed of seven villages: Herendești, Honorici, Pădureni, Petroasa Mare, Pini, Victor Vlad Delamarina (commune seat) and Visag.

The commune is the birthplace of poet Victor Vlad Delamarina (1870–1896).

== Geography ==
Victor Vlad Delamarina is located in the east of Timiș County, on the border with Caraș-Severin County, 62 km (39 mi) from Timișoara and 5 km (3.1 mi) from Lugoj, the nearest city. The dominant form of relief is the plain-hill.

The climate of the area belongs to the temperate continental type, with the most favorable climatic conditions for the development of agriculture. The summers are quite warm (average temperature of 22–23 °C or 72–73 °F in July), and the winters are not too severe. The rains, on the other hand, are quite heavy (over 800 mm or 31 in per year).

The vegetation is characteristic of the forest-steppe. Fir, spruce and beech forests predominate. The plain area is used for various crops such as wheat, potatoes, barley, maize, orchards of fruit trees. The fauna of the commune is rich and characteristic of the hill areas. Among the most widespread animals in this area are: wild boars, hares, pheasants, goats, etc.

== History ==
The first recorded mention of this village is from 1717, under the name of Satulmik, after the name of a woman Mica, who, at one point, moved the village from the old hearth located on a flooded place. She gave up a piece of land she owned to relocate the locality. Lugoskisfalu was part of Krassó-Szörény County, Lugoj District, in 1890, as a commune seat with 616 inhabitants. On the occasion of the territorial reorganization in 1968, the locality was named Victor Vlad Delamarina, in memory of the first dialectal poet of Romania, born here in 1870.

Honorici has been documented since 1725. Pădureni appears in records from 1923, when several families from Maramureș settled in the commune of Honorici. Known as pădurani, they earned this name due to their work in logging and transporting timber from the forest. Pini has been documented since 1902, when around 25 Hungarian families from Cenad settled in the area. Herendești is first mentioned in 1777. Visag, one of the oldest settlements in Timiș County, has been documented since 1350. Petroasa Mare has been recorded since 1786, following the colonization of the area by ethnic Germans. Today, about 15 German families remain in the locality, as most others have emigrated to Germany, though they continue to maintain strong ties with their place of origin.

== Demographics ==
Ethnic composition (2021)
1. Romanians (68.0%)
2. Ukrainians (16.6%)
3. Germans (1.29%)
4. Roma (1.09%)
5. Others (13.0%)
Religious composition (2021)
1. Orthodox (71.1%)
2. Pentecostals (8.55%)
3. Greek Catholics (2.87%)
4. Roman Catholics (2.39%)
5. Baptists (1.37%)
6. Unknown (12.2%)
7. Others (1.53%)

Victor Vlad Delamarina had a population of 2,467 inhabitants at the 2021 census, down 5.26% from the 2011 census. Most inhabitants are Romanians (68.01%), larger minorities being represented by Ukrainians (16.61%), Germans (1.29%) and Roma (1.09%). By religion, most inhabitants are Orthodox (71.13%), but there are also minorities of Pentecostals (8.55%), Greek Catholics (2.87%), Roman Catholics (2.39%) and Baptists (1.37%). For 12.16% of the population, religious affiliation is unknown.

Census		Ethnic composition
Year	Population	Romanians	Hungarians	Germans	Roma	Ukrainians	Slovaks
1880	4,536	3,377	192	657	–	–	217
1890	4,958	3,734	211	841	–	1	100
1900	5,548	4,200	145	1,106	–	17	46
1910	6,302	4,435	382	1,371	–	–	32
1920	5,755	4,049	88	1,289	–	–	–
1930	5,711	4,019	71	1,231	84	277	6
1941	5,903	3,886	148	1,302	–	–	–
1956	5,387	3,579	144	1,204	32	418	6
1966	4,925	3,191	101	1,166	–	459	2
1977	4,165	2,622	71	1,041	32	392	3
1992	2,889	2,208	57	191	35	355	–
2002	2,913	2,107	43	81	73	569	1
2011	2,604	1,816	28	53	23	568	–
2021	2,467	1,678	24	32	27	410	–

== Politics and administration ==
The commune of Victor Vlad Delamarina is administered by a mayor and a local council composed of 11 councilors. The mayor, Ioan-Cristian Cardaș, from the Social Democratic Party, has been in office since 2016. As from the 2024 local elections, the local council has the following composition by political parties:

Party	Seats	Composition
Social Democratic Party	6	
Save Romania Union–People's Movement Party–Force of the Right	2	
Alliance for the Union of Romanians	1	
Union of the Ukrainians of Romania	1	
National Liberal Party	1	

== Education ==
The commune has six kindergartens operating on a regular schedule, attended by a total of 118 children, and five schools in total. Among these, there are two elementary schools with eight classes located in Victor Vlad Delamarina and Petroasa Mare, and three primary schools in Honorici, Visag, and Herendești, collectively serving 240 students. Additionally, the school in Victor Vlad Delamarina includes a boarding facility with 50 places.

== Healthcare ==
The commune center has a human dispensary, and each of the five localities has a health point, staffed by four doctors and two medical assistants with secondary education. Additionally, there is a veterinary dispensary in Herendești, supported by one veterinarian and two veterinary technicians.

== Gallery ==
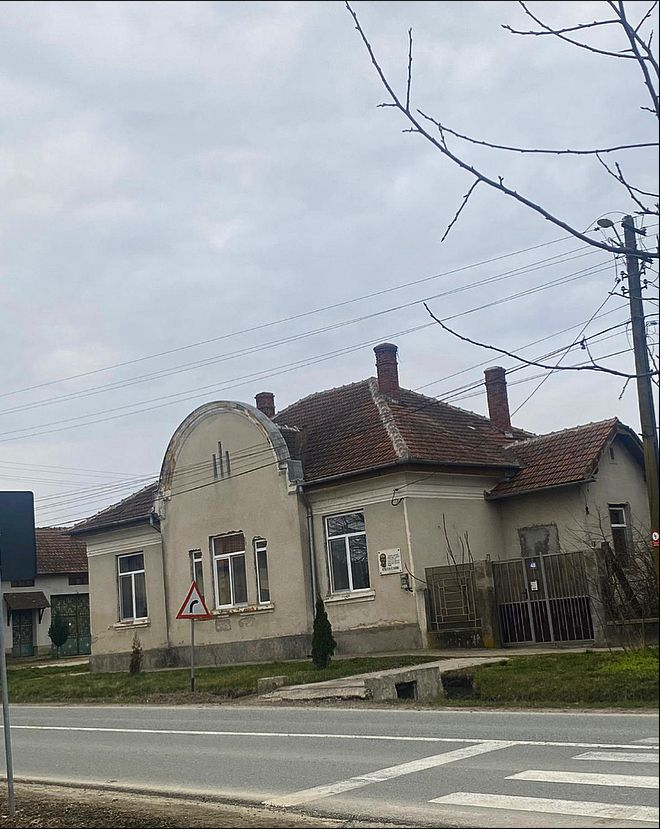
Victor Vlad Delamarina memorial house

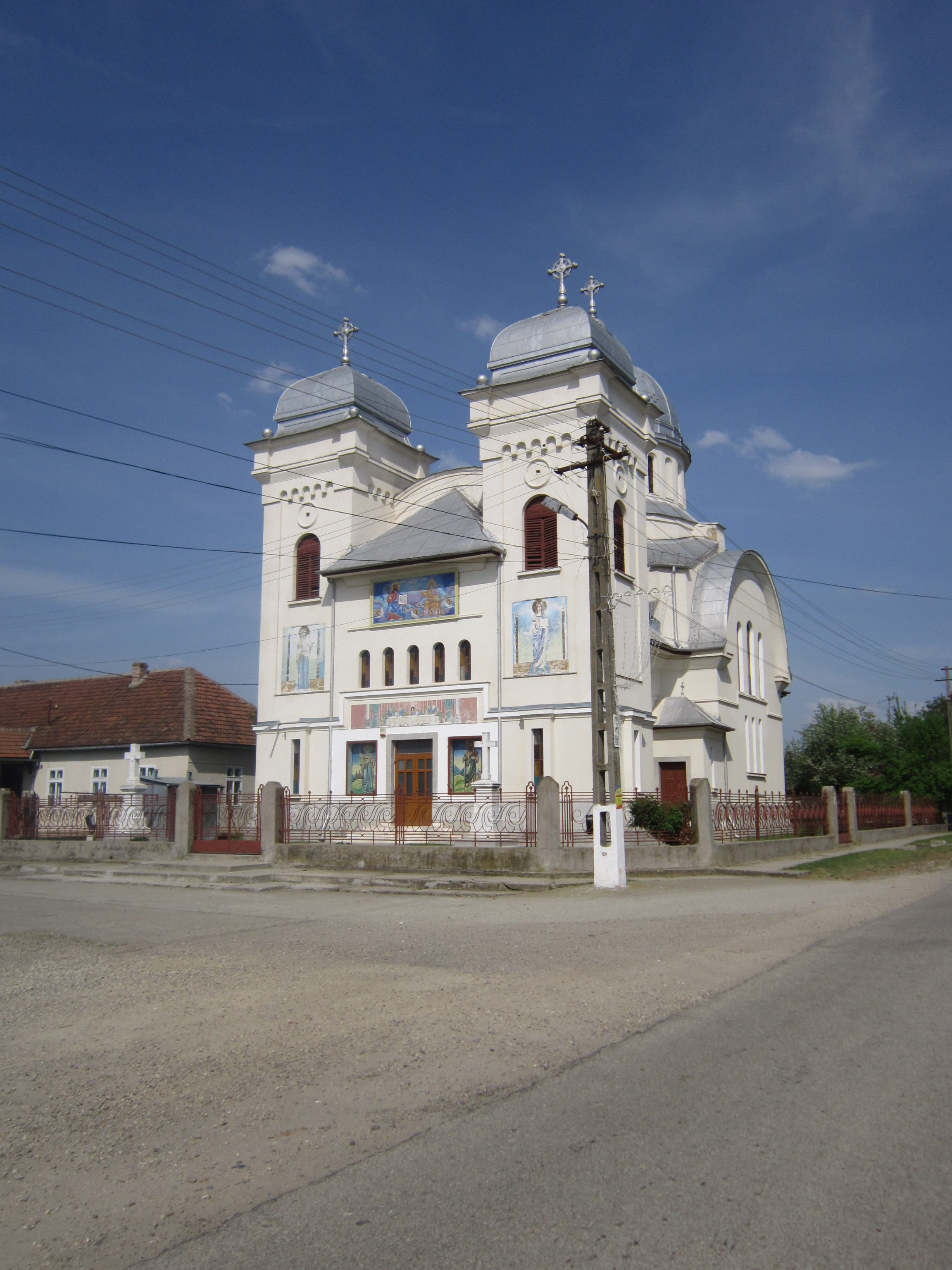
The Orthodox church in Herendești

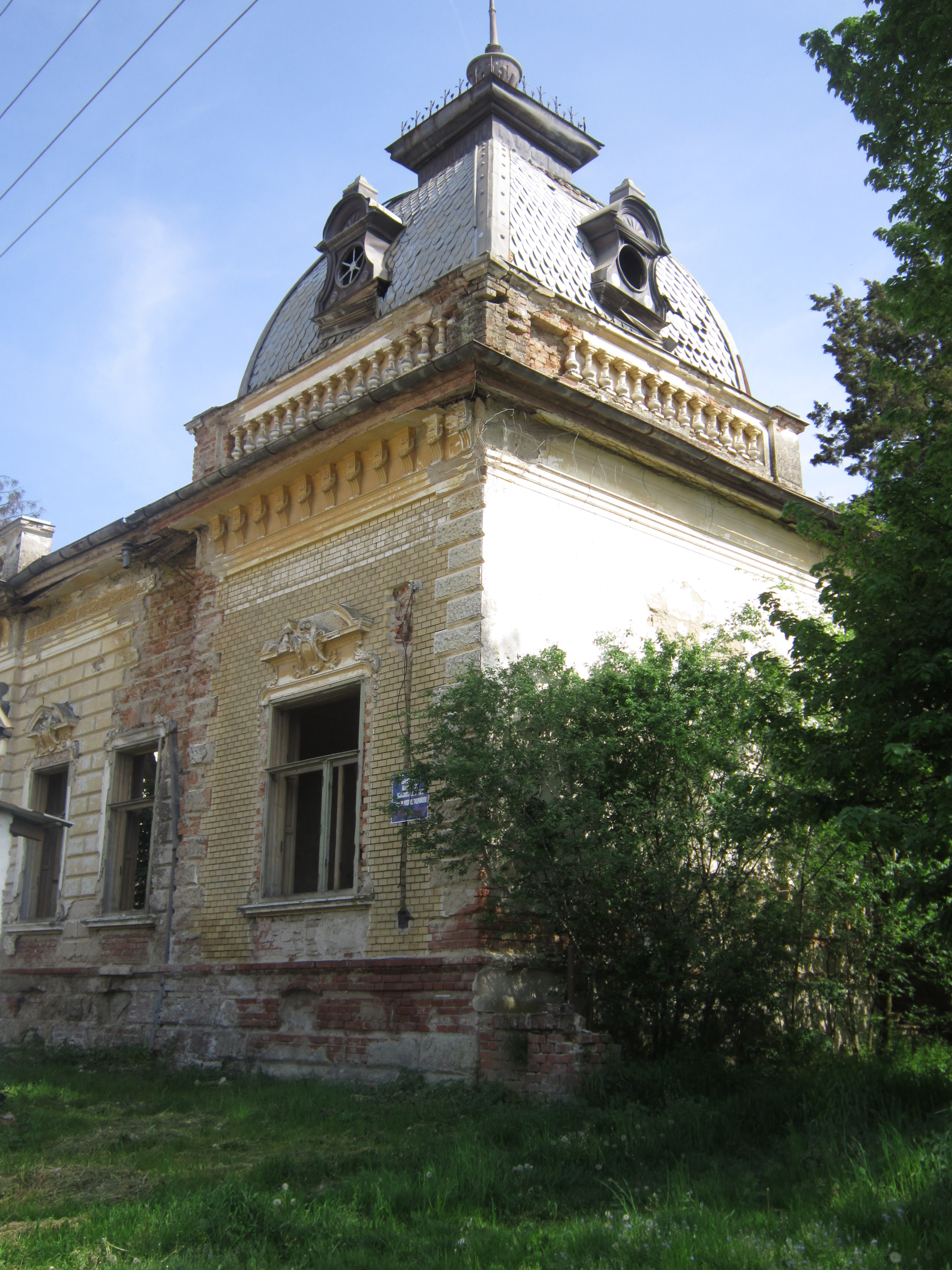
The ruins of Herglotz Mansion in Herendești
