= Magyar Szó =

- May 5, 1980 cover, after death of Josip Broz Tito
- Type: Daily newspaper
- Format: Berliner
- Publisher: Magyar Szó Lapkiadó Kft.
- Founded: 24 December 1944; 81 years ago
- Language: Hungarian
- Headquarters: Vojvode Mišića 1, Novi Sad, Vojvodina, Serbia
- ISSN: 0350-4182
- Website: www.magyarszo.rs

Magyar Szó (Hungarian pronunciation: [ˈmɒɟɒr ˈsoː], lit. Hungarian Word) is a Hungarian-language daily newspaper in Vojvodina, Serbia.

== History ==
It was founded in 1944, with the purpose of serving as the information source for the Hungarian minority of Vojvodina. It is published in Novi Sad. Magyar Szó is considered the main ethnic Hungarian media in Serbia and in the Autonomous Province of Vojvodina. To begin with, the newspaper was called Szabad Vajdaság, but the name was changed to Magyar Szó in 1945.

The newspaper is a member of MIDAS (European Association of Daily Newspapers in Minority and Regional Languages).

== Newspapers with same name ==
There was and is a number of newspapers that bear the same name. Here is a partial list of them:

- Magyar Szó (1900–1907) – a daily newspaper published in Budapest at the beginning of the 20th century;
- Magyar Szó (1919–1920) – belletristic weekly magazine, published in Oradea;
- Magyar Szó (1929–1937) – a daily newspaper, published in Oradea;
- Magyar Szó (London) – newspaper, briefly published by Hungarian diaspora in London, during and after the 1956 Revolution;
- Magyar Szó (New Zealand) – Bulletin of the Hungarian Community in New Zealand. ISSN 1171-8978.

== See also ==
- List of newspapers in Serbia
- Hungarians in Vojvodina
- Libertatea (Pančevo)
