= Sportski žurnal =

Serbian sports newspaper

Sportski žurnal Спортски Журнал
- Type: Daily newspaper
- Format: Tabloid
- Editor: Predrag Sarić
- Founded: 1990; 36 years ago
- Language: Serbian
- Headquarters: Trg Politika 1, Belgrade, Serbia
- Circulation: ~10,000 copies sold (2016)
- Website: www.zurnal.politika.rs

Sportski žurnal (Serbian Cyrillic: Спортски журнал) is a Serbian sports daily newspaper. About half of the pages are devoted to football, whereas the rest deals with athletics, auto racing, basketball, boxing, cycling, judo, karate, handball, tennis, shooting, skiing, swimming, volleyball, water polo, wrestling, and other Olympic and non-Olympic sports. This may slightly vary in the off-season or during big sporting events.

First issued on 17 May 1990, Sportski žurnal has since been published under the umbrella of Politika AD's family of newspapers and magazines (PNM).

== See also ==
- List of Serbian newspapers
