= Press (Belgrade newspaper) =

Middle-market tabloid, published 2005–2012

- Type: Daily newspaper
- Format: Tabloid
- Owner(s): see below
- Editor: see below
- Founded: 15 December 2005; 19 years ago
- Political alignment: Center-right; Populism
- Ceased publication: 15 November 2012
- Headquarters: 27. marta 69/14, 11000 Belgrade, Serbia
- Website: www.pressonline.rs

Press was a daily middle-market tabloid newspaper published in Belgrade between 2005 and 2012.

Launched by a group of journalists who left Kurir and published by the company they established called Press Publishing Group, Press quickly developed sizable readership, reaching high circulation in the process. In time, the company parleyed the daily's market success into other print media projects such as another daily Biznis, aimed at business people, as well as a lifestyle weekly magazine Lola and a glossy monthly magazine FAME.

For years, much like many other Serbian media outlets, the paper faced speculation and accusations about its ownership structure. Rumours about the Press' real owners being some of Serbia's most powerful politically connected business tycoons was rampant with individuals like Miroslav Mišković and Dragan Đilas often mentioned in this regard.

The daily was shut down in November 2012 amid great controversy that played out in the Serbian media when tycoon Miroslav Mišković announced his pull-out from the paper's ownership structure, thereby confirming his long-speculated association with the paper.

== Ownership ==
The Press owners controlled the paper through an entity named Press Publishing Group d.o.o. which was registered in Serbia as a limited liability company in mid October 2006.

Initially, it was co-owned by the three parties: Amber Press Limited company from Cyprus (50%), individual Đorđe Stefanović (40%), and Mediavox d.o.o. company from Belgrade (10%). However, since Mediavox is also owned by Stefanović, Press Publishing Group was essentially a 50-50 joint venture between Stefanović and Cypriot Amber Press.

The company quickly established itself on the Serbian media market, receiving accolades and posting good business returns. According to its 2007 annual financial report submitted to the Serbian Economic Register Agency, the company had 136 employees and it posted an annual profit of RSD58,830,000 (approximately € 0.7 million at the time) for the calendar year 2007.

Then in May 2009, the ownership was restructured with Stefanović's 40% stake divided amongst 4 individuals: Biljana Kralj (22%), Đoko Kesić (6%), Dragan J. Vučićević (6%), and Svetomir Marjanović (6%).

Over the years, there were frequent speculation about the identity of the individuals behind the companies listed in the Press ownership structure. Serbian tycoons and businessmen Miroslav Mišković and Dragan Đilas were often mentioned in this regard. On 12 November 2012, that speculation was confirmed when politically influential Serbian tycoon Miroslav Mišković announced his decision to sell his stake in the paper, admitting in the process that he was the paper largest individual stakeholder. Reacting to Mišković's announcement, Serbian deputy prime minister Aleksandar Vučić claimed that Serbian businessman and the mayor of Belgrade Dragan Đilas also owns a large stake in the paper and called on him to publicly admit it.

== History ==
In mid December 2005, Press became the latest in a growing list of Serbian print media outlets that came into existence due to a group of journalists leaving their previous place of employment en masse to launch a new paper. This is how Vreme weekly was started in 1990 (left Politika), Naša borba in 1994 (left Borba), and Glas javnosti in 1998 (left Blic).

In this case, the majority of Press staffers—including editor-in-chief Đoko Kesić and his deputy Dragan J. Vučićević—had worked at Kurir from its May 2003 inception until early December 2005 when a dispute over revenue sharing came to a head, resulting in about 90% of Kurir's staff leaving the paper. Public accusations of corruption and political skullduggery started flying thick and fast between Kurir owner Radisav Rodić on one side and Kesić-Vučićević editing duo on the other. During mid December 2005, Vučićević and newly named Kurir editor-in-chief Antonije Kovačević even publicly squared off in an impromptu TV duel on BKTV's talk-show Klopka hosted by Olivera Kovačević (no relation to Antonije Kovačević), but apart from a lot of shouting and theatrical rhetoric not many concrete facts were established.

Led by Kesić and Vučićević, the group that left Kurir announced their plan to start their own daily tabloid named Dnevni kurir, however, Kurir owner Rodić immediately filed a complaint with Trade Court, protesting copyright infringement. The court agreed with him and issued an immediate junction prohibiting publication under that name. Though they felt Kurir became what it is in large part due to their own efforts and skills, Kesić & Vučićević decided not to pursue the matter further legally and ended the issue by naming their new tabloid Press, instead.

Its premiere issue came out on 15 December 2005.

=== Press vs. Bojan Krišto ===
In late November 2008, Press began running a series of articles about Bojan Krišto, CEO of the state-owned company JP Aerodrom Beograd which operates Belgrade's Nikola Tesla Airport. The issue was his free-spending business practice when it came to approving salary bonuses for himself and members of the company's managing board. Since by the nature of the position, Krišto was politically delegated by G17 Plus, a member party of the ruling coalition For a European Serbia (ZES), the whole thing soon erupted into a political scandal. Opposition MPs demanded his resignation along with pressing criminal charges while even the President of Serbia Boris Tadić chimed in, calling the situation unacceptable. Much of the public's anger was directed at Krišto's party boss Mlađan Dinkić who was also the Minister of Economy and Regional Development as well as the Deputy Prime Minister. For a while it even appeared that this was the beginning of a rift in the Serbian ruling coalition and some even went as far as suggesting that together with other disagreements between government members such as the Russian gas deal, this airport case might just make the government fall.

No such thing happened, however, as Krišto resigned on 25 November 2008 under the weight of public pressure while Dinkić went on B92 programme Utisak nedelje on 30 November 2008 and more or less defended his party colleague. Dinkić repeatedly referred to the entire episode as "witch hunt" and even suggested that part of the motivation for Press to go after Krišto might lay in his apparent decision to make them pay the outstanding sum on the sponsorship deal that allowed the Press logo to be printed on the back of boarding passes issued at the airport. The very next day Press responded to this by saying they will present Dinkić with all the details of that particular business deal and demand that he issue a public apology for the "libelous remark".

=== Closing ===
On 15 November 2012, in the wake of Miroslav Mišković's announcement of his pulling out of the paper, the paper announced that day's issue to be its last in print. It was also announced on the same occasion that the issue for Republika Srpska would continue as well as the website. According to unofficial sources, the paper accrued debts of more than €16 million at the time of its folding.

Mišković's implicit admission of owning a stake in Press when he announced his pullout from the paper as well as the publication's demise three days later, caused a lot of reaction and controversy on the Serbian media scene as well as in the country's wider public. It again opened the issue of the real ownership behind Serbian print and electronic media outlets.

== Reaction to the paper's demise ==
=== Ljiljana Smajlović ===
Ljiljana Smajlović, president of the Serbian Journalists' Association (UNS) said: "UNS supports the Press employees' demands of getting to the bottom of everything when it comes to Press — who were their real owners, what was the paper's circulation, and why weren't they given the opportunity to put together a newspaper the way they wanted to. UNS further appeals on the creditors of Press to show understanding of the situation the paper's employees find themselves in and to exercise restraint considering Miroslav Mišković's publicly stated promise to pay off most of the paper's outstanding debts. UNS is further criticizing the current Serbian government (led by Dačić and Vučić) for not delivering on one of its first promises upon taking office — discussing Verica Barać's report that clearly identified murky ownership structure of media outlets as the biggest threat to press freedom in Serbia. If it doesn't determine once and for all why the Serbian media market turned into Wild West where everybody deceives everybody when it comes to ownership structure and circulation figures, this government will share the responsibility for the situation with the previous one. It would be good if the Press' other owner — the still clandestine one — finally owned up and took responsibility for the paper's finances thereby helping the journalists re-form their newspaper, hopefully this time without debts to tycoons".

=== Dragan J. Vučićević ===
On 15 November 2012, at a press-conference he called over a different issue, former Press editor-in-chief, columnist, and one of its founders Dragan J. Vučićević (at the time the editor-in-chief of Informer) took several questions about the paper's demise. He said on the occasion: "Towards the end of 2010, Press got hijacked and taken away from me and the other founders by the people from top echelons of the authorities that ran Serbia at the time. They basically blackmailed us with a threat of laying off the 250 staffers that were employed at the paper at the time as well as the threat of making sure our loans don't get re-programmed. From the second half of 2010 until I eventually left in late December 2011 when they wouldn't allow me to continue writing my column, I was neither involved in the paper's business nor its editorial policy. All I did for the paper in 2010 and 2011 was writing a weekly column. Yes, I was listed at the same time as the managing board president of the Press Publishing Group, but it was only a formal title by the decision of some people that made decisions at the time — in reality I had nothing to do with the managing board, which by the way didn't even exist, and I'm not the right man to talk to about what went on in that paper during its last three years of existence. Yes, I was fictitiously listed as the managing board president. As far as Oliver Dulić and the payments from his environmental fund go, I learned of those only after I had already left Press. I had nothing to do with him. If you prove that I ever met him, signed any of his payments, or even talked to him over the phone I'll gladly go to jail. I never took a dinar from Dulić or anyone else from the Tadić authorities. I only suffered under those authorities. During the Tadić era in Serbia, only a few journalists dared to put up consistent and resolute resistance to his tyrannical rule and I feel that resisting Tadić and his cronies is one of the greatest highlights of my career in journalism. Especially under the circumstances when other journalists kept silent while cashing in their integrity from Dulić and other characters like Cole, Krle, and Šane".

This was in stark contrast to what Vučićević had to say on the same subject two years earlier in December 2010. Asked at the time about the Serbian tycoons' alleged clandestine involvement in the Serbian newspapers' ownership structure, Vučićević, the managing board president of Press Publishing Group, answered: "In Serbia there are constant conspiracy theories about different tycoons having a stake in various newspapers. That's not exactly the case and I'll tell why it isn't. The newspaper business in Serbia is not profitable enough for tycoons to be interested in it. They can turn much greater profits in other endeavours so why would they invest in newspapers. Do you know how long it takes to start making a profit on your investment in a newspaper? Between 5-7 years. Why would someone invest €1 million in a newspaper and then wait for 7 years to make that money back". Asked explicitly on the same occasion who owns Press, Vučićević answered: "Press is owned by Đoko Kesić, Sveta Marjanović, Biljana Kralj, and myself". Pressed further to say who is politically behind Press, Vučićević emphatically repeated: "No one".

=== Čedomir Jovanović ===
Speaking on the political talk-show Utisak nedelje, the leader of opposition Liberal Democratic Party (LDP) Čedomir Jovanović said that public revelation about Mišković and Đilas being the owners of Press wasn't news to him, before continuing: "Press was the price Mišković had to pay to the DS-led authorities. It was a government racket".

== Editorial history ==
- Đoko Kesić December 2005 – November 2007
- Dragan J. Vučićević November 2007 – November 2010
- Svetomir Marjanović November 2010 – January 2011
- Veljko Lalić January 2011 – August 2012
- Borislav Kasanski August 2012 - October 2012
- Miša Brkić October 2012 – November 2012
