= Radar (news magazine) =

Serbian magazine

- Editor-in-chief: Vesna Mališić
- Categories: News magazine
- Frequency: Weekly
- Publisher: Rotografika d.o.o.
- First issue: 14 March 2024
- Company: United Media Digital d.o.o.
- Country: Serbia
- Based in: Belgrade
- Language: Serbian
- Website: https://radar.nova.rs
- ISSN: 3009-4844

Radar is a weekly news magazine published in Belgrade, Serbia.

It is published by the regional media conglomerate United Media, owned by the United Group, who also own television channels N1 and Nova S, and the daily newspaper Danas.

In January 2024, following a change in ownership of the magazine NIN, the entire editorial staff resigned and established Radar. The name was selected via public poll.
