= Svet kompjutera =

Serbian computer magazine

SVET KOMPJUTERA

- Cover of June 2010 issue
- Editor-In-Chief: Zoran Mošorinski
- Categories: IT, Computers, Video game consoles, Mobile phones, Computer games
- Frequency: Monthly
- First issue: October 1984; 40 years ago
- Company: Politika AD
- Country: Serbia
- Based in: Belgrade
- Language: Serbian
- Website: www.sk.rs
- ISSN: 0352-5031

Svet kompjutera (World of Computers) is a computer magazine published in Serbia. It has a circulation of about 50,000 and is owned by the media company Politika AD.

Svet kompjutera deals with subjects on home, PC computers, tablet computers, smartphones (mobile phones), and video game consoles as well as their use for work and entertainment.

It is published monthly and can be purchased in all newsstands in Serbia. It can be also found in North Macedonia, Slovenia, Bosnia and Herzegovina, Croatia, Montenegro and many other European countries.

The magazine consists of 148 pages, commercial advertisements forming nearly half of the magazine. It is printed in quality full colour offset technology.

The editorial staff generally consists of younger people - the average age being 26 years, while the average age of contributors is 20 years.

== History ==
The first issue of the Svet kompjutera was printed in October 1984.

The first editor-in-chief was Milan Misic, later Politika's correspondent from India and Japan, then foreign policy column editor, and former editor-in-chief in the same newspaper. Many other prominent intellectuals and programmers have been involved with the magazine since its inception.

In 1986, when home computers were popularized, a games subsection of the Svet kompjutera eventually evolved into a special issue Svet igara (Games World). This issue was published from time to time as a supplement to the games column in the magazine. That same year, Svet kompjutera had a special edition in Russian that was distributed to the former Soviet Union.

In 1988, Svet kompjutera organized "Computer '88", a small computer fair in downtown Belgrade.

In August 2005 Svet kompjutera formed its official Web forum named "Forum Sveta kompjutera". As of February 2011 it had over 26,000 users and over 1,200,000 posts in over 56,000 topics.
