= Žitkovica =

Žitkovica Житковица (Serbian) Jâtcovița or Jitcovița (Romanian)
- Village
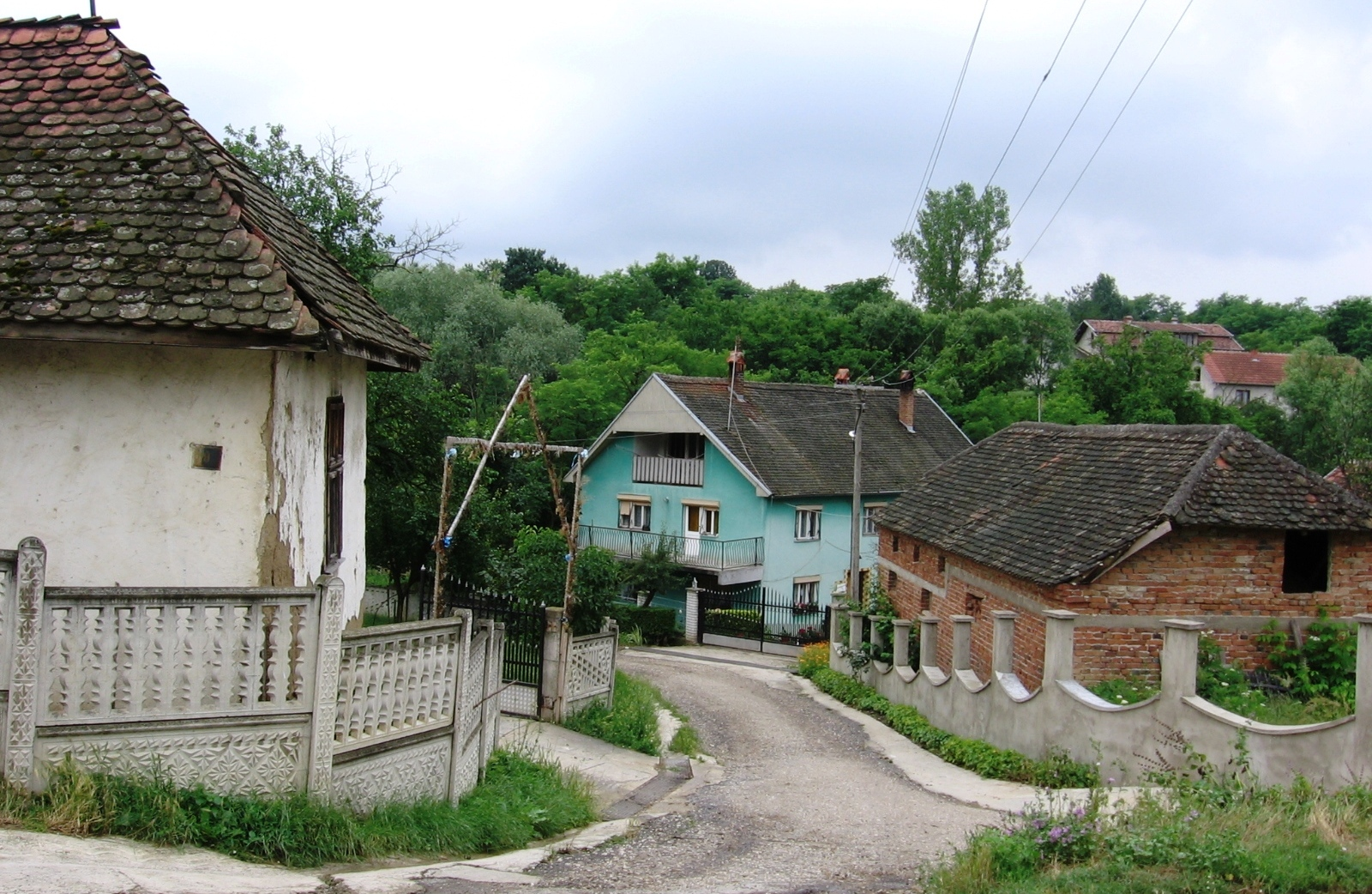

- Location within Serbia
- Coordinates: 44°35′53″N 21°34′30″E
- Country: Serbia
- District: Braničevo District
- Municipality: Golubac

Population (2002)
  - Total: 142
- Time zone: UTC+1 (CET)
  - Summer (DST): UTC+2 (CEST)

Žitkovica (Serbian: Житковица; Romanian: Jâtcovița or Jitcovița) is a village in the municipality of Golubac, Serbia. According to the 2002 census, the village has a population of 142 people.

Since 2007, the Romanian Dance (Joc Românesc) festival takes place annually in Žitkovica, under the coordination of Ivica Glišić (Ivica Glișici), president of the Serbian branch of the European Forum for History and Culture. The festival features Romanian traditional costumes and folk songs and dances. Romanian politician, historian and journalist Eugen Tomac described the festival as the largest Romanian cultural event in the region, stating that, as of 2021, no local, regional or national authority had ever participated in it. Nonetheless, that year's edition was organized for the first time with support from the National Council of the Romanian National Minority (CNMNR). The 2023 edition was attended by representatives of the CNMNR and the Romanian embassy in Serbia.
