= National Council of the Romanian National Minority =

The National Council of the Romanian National Minority (Romanian: Consiliul Național al Minorității Naționale Române, CNMNR; Serbian: Национални савет румунске националне мањине, НСРНМ) is the representative body of Romanians in Serbia, established for the protection of their rights and the minority self-government. It is an organization which aims to maintain minority autonomy in the domains of culture, education, media, and the use of the Romanian language in Serbia where it is official at a provincial (Vojvodina) and local level.

The CNMNR's headquarters are located in Vršac (Vârșeț), a town that also has a Romanian consulate. The council also has regional offices in Kladovo (Cladova), Kučevo (Cuciovă), Novi Sad and Uzdin (Uzdâni). In 2021, the Romanian Dance (Joc Românesc) annual festival in Žitkovica (Jâtcovița or Jitcovița), the largest Romanian cultural event in the region according to Romanian politician, historian and journalist Eugen Tomac, was organized for the first time with support from the CNMNR. On 1 March 2026, the Romanian tradition of Mărțișor was celebrated at the council's office in Kučevo, in an event organized by the Poiana Lungă Association. The president of the CNMNR at the time was Daniel Magdu.

== See also ==
- Libertatea (Pančevo)
- National Council of the Vlach National Minority
