= Libertatea (Pančevo) =

- Categories: current affairs
- Frequency: Weekly
- Publisher: National Council of the Romanian National Minority
- First issue: 1945
- Country: Serbia
- Based in: Pančevo (Panciova)
- Language: Romanian
- Website: libertatea.rs

Libertatea (lit. Liberty) is a Romanian language weekly newspaper in Serbia, published in Pančevo (Romanian: Panciova). The newspaper was established in 1945 after the end of World War II.

While originally established by the Autonomous Province of Vojvodina, the province transferred all rights and responsibilities to the National Council of the Romanian National Minority in 2004.

== History ==
The newspaper was established in 1945, while the transfer of rights happened in 2004. In 2018, the newspaper was awarded the Ordinul "Meritul Cultural" by the President of Romania Klaus Iohannis.

In a 2020 telephone session, the National Council of the Romanian National Minority dismissed the Management Board and appointed new members of that body. The 20 staff members of the newspaper's publishing house (including the director Niku Čobanu) strongly condemned the action of the Romanian National Council. The decision was criticized by the Alliance for Serbia and the League of Social Democrats of Vojvodina as an attempt to turn Libertatea into a bulletin of the ruling Serbian Progressive Party.

== See also ==
- Romanians of Serbia
- Romanian language in Serbia
- Magyar Szó
