= Victor Vlad Delamarina =

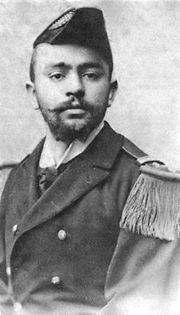
Delamarina in naval uniform

Victor Vlad Delamarina (Romanian pronunciation: [ˈviktor ˈvlad delamaˈrina]; August 31, 1870 – May 15 [O.S. May 3] 1896) was an Austro-Hungarian-born Romanian poet.

Born in Satu Mic (today called Victor Vlad Delamarina) near Lugoj in the Banat, he attended primary school taught in Hungarian and German, followed by gymnasium in Lugoj. Moving to the Romanian Old Kingdom, he went to Saint Sava National College in Bucharest, to the military high schools in Craiova and Iaşi, and to the Higher Military School in Bucharest for two years, becoming a Second Lieutenant in the Romanian Naval Forces. Commissioned to the brig Mircea, during the summer of 1891 he sailed on the Constanţa-Istanbul-Chios-Rhodes-Piraeus-Thessaloniki-Constanţa route. He chronicled the journey in Călătoria bricului Mircea ("The Voyage of the Brig Mircea"), published later that year. He also participated in tours on the protected cruiser NMS Elisabeta on the Black Sea, the Mediterranean and the Adriatic.

Delamarina began writing as a schoolboy. Travel recollections of his appeared in Familia in 1893, and the following year, Valeriu Branişte published his poems in the Timișoara journal Dreptatea. By virtue of these poems' being written in the Banat subdialect of Romanian, Delamarina introduced a new trend in Romanian poetry: the use of written subdialect. A number of literary historians underlined the importance of his contribution, including Titu Maiorescu, Ilarie Chendi, I. D. Suciu, Gabriel Țepelea, George Muntean, Al. Bistrițeanu and Virgil Vintilescu. The latter published a study of his life and work in 1967.

He died in 1896, aged 25, in Petroasa Mare village near his birthplace, and was buried in Lugoj.
