= Miroljub (magazine) =

Quarterly magazine published in Croatian

- Type: Quarterly magazine in Croatian
- Owner(s): Sekcija za njegovanje kulture i običaja bunjevačkih i šokačkih Hrvata; HKUD Vladimir Nazor, Sombor
- Editor: Josip Z. Pekanović
- Founded: 1998; 28 years ago
- Headquarters: Sombor
- ISSN: 1452-5976

Miroljub is a quarterly magazine published in Croatian from the Bačka city of Sombor, autonomic province of Vojvodina, Serbia.

== Name ==
This magazine got its name after Croatian writer from Bačka Miroljub Ante Evetović.

== History and orientation ==
Its concern is the community of Croats in Bačka. It contains the texts about the work of HKUD "Vladimir Nazor" from Sombor, historical events, literary work of HKUD's members and members of neighbouring societies and actual events from Sombor and neighbourhood.

Its publisher is "Sekcija za njegovanje kulture i običaja bunjevačkih i šokačkih Hrvata" (Section for Preserving Culture and Tradition of Bunjevac and Šokac Croats) of HKUD "Vladimir Nazor" from Sombor. Miroljub is also the organ of this society.

It was founded in 1998. For a period of time, Miroljub had an online edition. Its editors were Matija Đanić and Josip Z. Pekanović.
