= Žaklina Tatalović =

Serbian journalist (born 1980)

- Жаклина Таталовић
- Born: 30 March 1980 (age 46); Zemun (Belgrade), SR Serbia, SFR Yugoslavia
- Education: Faculty of Political Sciences
- Alma mater: University of Belgrade
- Occupation: Journalist
- Years active: 1999–present
- Employer: N1 (2018–2026)
- Television: BK, Fox, N1
- Website: N1 Profile

Žaklina Tatalović (Serbian Cyrillic: Жаклина Таталовић; born 30 March 1980) is a Serbian journalist who worked for several television stations, including and most notably at N1 until recently, when she quit her job there alongside nine other prominent journalists in a collective resignation over disagreements with the station's new management and editorial direction.

== Biography ==
Žaklina Tatalović was born in 1980 in Zemun, where she completed elementary school and the Zemun Gymnasium. She also attended the Music School Kosta Manojlović. During high school, when enrolling at the University of Belgrade, she hesitated between the Faculty of Medicine or the Faculty of Political Sciences; she decided to study journalism at the Faculty of Political Sciences. She enrolled in the faculty immediately after the NATO bombing of Yugoslavia in 1999. Since state faculties in Serbia were on strike and classes were not held, her mother enrolled her in the BK School of Journalism.

She lives and works in Belgrade.

== Journalistic career ==
She began her career as a journalist at the age of 19. After graduating from the BK School of Journalism, Tatalović stayed on to work as a volunteer at BK, where she went from being a street reporter in the morning program to an accredited journalist at the United Nations headquarters in New York City. In an interview, she said that it was while working at BK that she learned everything she knows about journalism. According to her own words, she has no role models in journalism, but she was "lucky" to have had Aleksandar Tijanić, Srđan Đurić, Bojana Lekić, Milomir Marić, Olja Milošević, Igor Šanjević as her editors, from whom she learned a lot.

In 2006, she moved from BK to Fox and worked in almost all editorial departments there. As a reporter for the news program, she reported from legislative sessions of the National Assembly, and she gained recognition by asking her interlocutors very direct questions. She was a contributor to the show Veče sa Ivanom Ivanovićem and many of the questions that Ivan Ivanović asked his guests on the show were written by Žaklina Tatalović.

In 2018, when Fox was transformed into Prva Srpska Televizija, Tatalović disagreed with the new editorial policy and she decided to leave that house after 12 years and move to N1, where she worked as a journalist in the news department.

On 16 October 2026, Tatalović prominently parted ways with N1, participating in a collective resignation alongside nine other celebrated journalists, including Danica Vučenić, Nataša Miljković, Adam Santovac, and Mia Bjelogrlić. In a joint public statement, Tatalović and her colleagues explained that they chose to leave due to a "refusal to accept structural and editorial changes introduced under a new corporate management team led by Brent Sadler and news director Branislav Šovljanski". The journalists explicitly cited patterns of "authoritarian management ", a breakdown of internal professional standards, and attempts to shift the network's editorial policy toward feigning political normalcy ahead of the 2026 Serbian parliamentary elections. Additionally, the resignation followed months of unaddressed internal friction, including a formal grievance submitted by the staff in September 2026 regarding the management's public treatment of Tatalović and Vučenić, which corporate leadership ignored. The collective resignation has attracted significant public attention.

She advocates for objective journalism and direct access to interlocutors. She raised topics, namely scandals and criticisms directed against the ruling coalition gathered around the Serbian Progressive Party. Due to her approach at press conferences, which he characterized as impolite, President of Serbia Aleksandar Vučić stated that she "deserved to be kicked out of the press conference a long time ago".

She is often the target of inappropriate comments, insults by pro-regime tabloids, media and dissenters and she also received direct threats.

Žaklina Tatalović appears as herself in the 13th episode of season 2 of the series Marked in the Racket.
