= Pravda (Serbia) =

Former Serbians newspaper

- Type: Daily newspaper
- Format: Tabloid
- Owner: Pravda Press d.o.o.
- Editor: Predrag Popović
- Founded: 5 March 2007; 19 years ago
- Ceased publication: 1 June 2012
- Political alignment: Sensationalism; Populism pro-SRS (2007–2008); Pro-SNS (2008–2012)
- Headquarters: Karađorđeva 65, 11000 Belgrade
- Website: pravda.rs

Pravda (Serbian Cyrillic: Правда, which means "Justice") was a daily tabloid newspaper published in Belgrade, Serbia.

== Ownership ==
Pravda was published by Pravda Press, a limited liability company with Nemanja Stefanović (48%), Jugoslav Petković (47%), and Nikola Petrović (5%) listed as its owners. Nemanja Stefanović's brother is Nebojša Stefanović, a Serbian Radical Party (SRS) and later Serbian Progressive Party (SNS) official.

== History ==
The first issue of Pravda appeared on 5 March 2007, about six weeks after the 2007 Serbian parliamentary election, in which the most popular political party in Serbia at the time, the Serbian Radical Party (SRS) led by Vojislav Šešelj who had been in the dock at the Hague since 2003, once again won the most seats (81 out of 250). Still, despite yet another impressive electoral showing, SRS had trouble forming a government due to facing a situation where no other party wanted to enter into a coalition with them. Within days of the premiere issue, journalist Predrag Popović, who previously edited Nacional, became editor-in-chief. Popović would later reveal that he had been hired by Aleksandar Vučić, a high-ranking SRS official at the time.

Pravda adopted an anti-establishment editorial policy within the Serbian context and was critical of the Serbian ruling coalition formed around the policy of cohabitation between prime minister Vojislav Koštunica of the Democratic Party of Serbia (DSS) and the president of the republic Boris Tadić of the Democratic Party (DS). The paper generally espoused rightist political views and promoted the SRS political agenda. Pravda created minor controversy in Serbia when in November 2007 it started publishing irregular columns by Mira Marković, the wife of late Serbian and Yugoslav president Slobodan Milošević and herself a fugitive from the Serbian justice system.

The paper's 1 June 2012 issue was announced to be its last as the newspaper folded. It switched to an all-digital online format.

== Reaction ==
Pravda is frequently cited, including by Predrag Popovic, its onetime editor-in-chief, as having been a publication controlled by Aleksandar Vučić and tailored for his personal day-to-day political needs, When the daily got launched in March 2007, Vučić was a high-ranking member of the Serbian Radical Party (SRS), an opposition party whose leader Vojislav Šešelj had been detained in the Hague, awaiting trial, since February 2003.

In a November 2014 interview, upon being temporarily released from detention, Vojislav Šešelj mentioned that the roots of Vučić's row with Serb businessman Miroslav Mišković and the tycoon's subsequent persecution and incarceration were in their past dealings over Pravda:

"According to my information, Vučić asked Mišković for money for Pravda on several occasions, but got rejected each time. Mišković reasoned that already paying Tomislav Nikolić off with large sums of money was more than enough so he figured why now also pay Vučić. Vučić never forgot that and as soon as he grabbed power in Serbia, he decided to exact revenge on Mišković".

== See also ==
- Informer
