= Građanski list =

Daily Newspaper in Serbia

- Type: Daily newspaper
- Format: ?
- Owner: Credenda Classics d.o.o.
- Editor: Miodrag Nikić
- Founded: December 2000; 25 years ago
- Headquarters: Šafarikova 15, 21000 Novi Sad, Serbia, +381/21-480-4555 Novi Sad
- Website: www.gradjanski.rs

Građanski list (Civic paper) was a daily newspaper published in Novi Sad, Serbia.

It published information about life in Vojvodina and the region, politics, culture, daily life, etc. The weekend issue had ads and a guide for the weekly TV schedule and information about cultural events in Novi Sad.

The first issue was published in December 2000. The paper folded in 2010.
