= Večernje novosti =

Daily newspaper in Serbia

Вечерње новости Večernje novosti

- Type: Daily newspaper
- Format: Tabloid
- Owner: Novosti AD
- Editor: Milorad Vučelić
- Founded: 16 October 1953; 72 years ago
- Political alignment: Pro-SNS; Populism; Ultranationalism; Yugoslav Wars war crimes denial; Russophilia; Social conservatism; Anti-LGBT propaganda
- Headquarters: Trg Nikole Pašića 7, Belgrade, Republic of Serbia
- Circulation: ~68,000 copies sold (2016)
- Website: novosti.rs

Večernje novosti (Serbian Cyrillic: Вечерње новости; lit. 'Evening News') is a Serbian daily tabloid newspaper. Founded in 1953, it quickly grew into a high-circulation daily and also employs foreign correspondents spread around 23 national capitals around the globe.

The principal Yugoslav-level media companies were Borba and Tanjug. Borba published two daily newspapers, Borba and Večernje novosti. Borba was a daily broad-sheet, was well known as the official voice of the government, and in the early 1950s, it was the best-selling newspaper in Yugoslavia. The second daily newspaper published by Borba was Večernje novosti, a well-edited evening paper. It was a modern tabloid with short news, human interest stories, big photos, well-written headlines, and many sports, city and regional reports. For a long period of time Večernje novosti had the largest circulation in Yugoslavia. Only Večernji list from Zagreb occasionally beat them.

== History ==
Večernje novosti was introduced on the stands on 16 October 1953, edited by Slobodan Glumac, who set the newspaper's tone for years to come. Housing an extensive network of journalists and contributors, the paper reported and commented on various issues and events according to its mantra: fast, brief and clear.

In the mid-1980s, Novosti got a big scoop by publishing the old files of the State Commission for War Crimes, which shed new light on Austrian president Kurt Waldheim's involvement in war crimes during World War II. The file F-25572 dated 17 November 1947, which Novosti published for the first time gave new details of Waldheim's whereabouts in Yugoslavia during the war.

=== Yugoslav Wars era ===
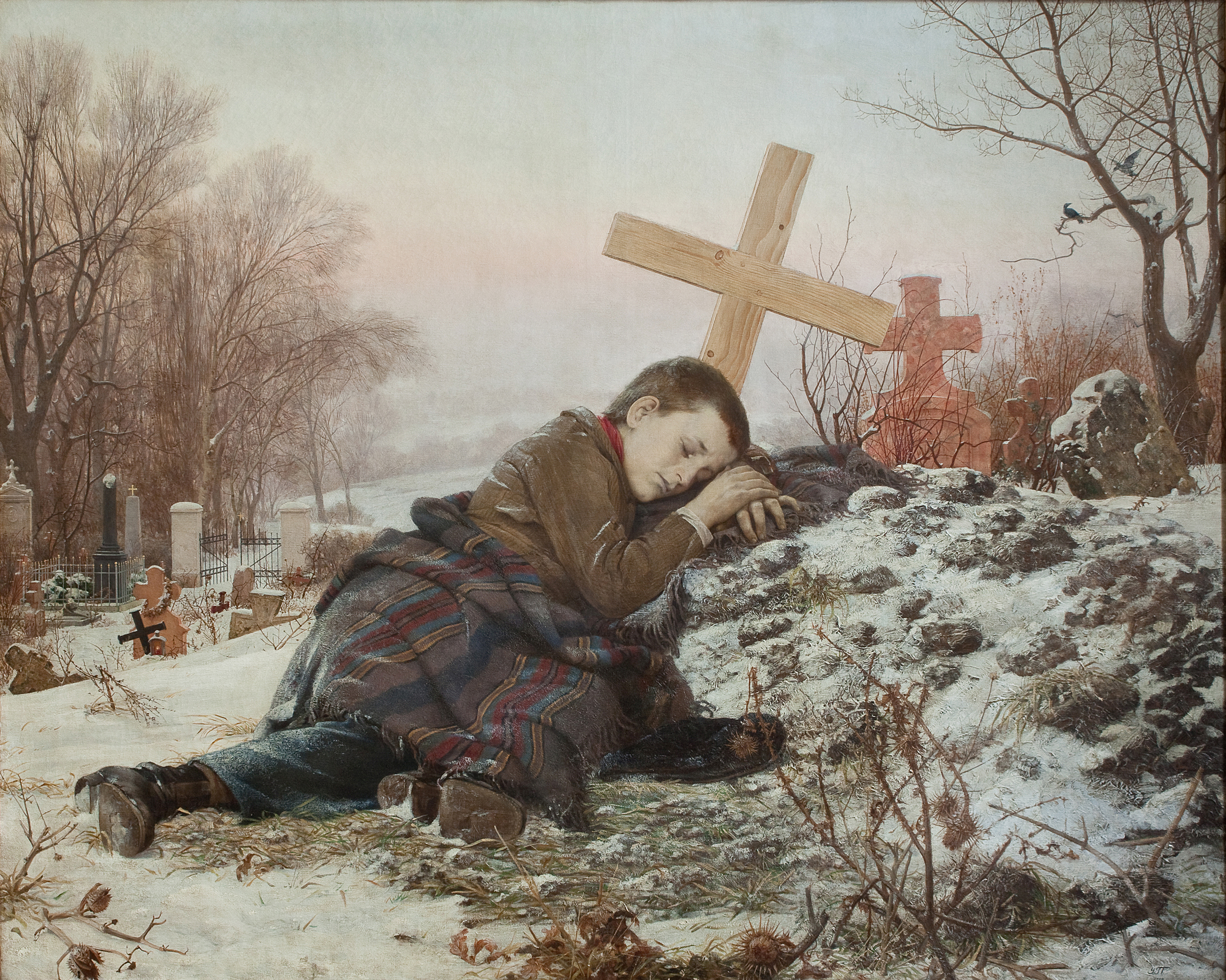
During the Bosnian War, Večernje novosti published a war report supposedly from Bosnia illustrated with Uroš Predić's 1888 painting (below) presented as an actual photograph (above) of a "Serbian boy whose whole family was killed by Bosniaks". The original title of Predić's painting is "Siroče na majčinom grobu" (Orphan at mother's grave).

In September 1986, parts of the SANU Memorandum were published by Večernje novosti.

== Controversies ==
According to the investigative journalist organisation KRIK, Večernje novosti published over 263 biased and unfounded articles in its newspaper in 2024.

During the Russian invasion of Ukraine, Večernje novosti has published disinformation on events related to the war. It has also published disinformation regarding the 2024–present Serbian anti-corruption protests.

== Privatization ==
On 4 February 2006, retired basketball ace Vlade Divac expressed his desire to invest in Novosti, perhaps even buy the majority stake, but decided to lie low until the paper's complex ownership structure disputes were resolved. There was also an initial interest from two media conglomerates, WAZ-Mediengruppe and Northcliffe Media, a division of Daily Mail and General Trust in buying a stake in Večernje novosti.

=== Editorial history ===
- Slobodan Glumac (1953–1957)
- Vasilije Kraljević (1957–1959)
- Bogdan Pešić (1959–1963)
- Slobodan Glumac (1963–1969)
- Mirko Stamenković (1969–1972)
- Jovan Jauković (1972–1974)
- Živko Milić (1974–1976)
- Tomislav Milinović (1976–1984)
- Ilija Borovnjak (1984–1987)
- Radoslav Brajović (1987–1998)
- Pero Simić (1998–2000)
- Dušan Čukić (2000)
- Manojlo Vukotić (2000–2013)
- Ratko Dmitrović (2013–2017)
- Milorad Vučelić (2017–present)

== See also ==
- List of newspapers in Serbia
