= Kurir =

Daily tabloid newspaper published in Belgrade, Serbia

- Type: Daily newspaper
- Format: Tabloid
- Owner: Telekom Srbija (through Mondo Inc)
- Editor: Rajko Nedić
- Founded: 6 May 2003; 23 years ago
- Political alignment: Pro-SNS
- Headquarters: Vlajkovićeva 8, Belgrade, Serbia
- Circulation: ~60,000 copies sold (2016)
- Website: kurir.rs

Kurir is a daily tabloid newspaper published in Belgrade, Serbia. Its publisher, Mondo Inc, also operates the television channel Kurir TV, and has been owned by the state-controlled Telekom Srbija since 2025. Known for its sensationalism, Kurir supported the Democratic Party while it was in power and switched to supporting the Serbian Progressive Party (SNS) after 2012. After the SNS lost the 2026 Serbian parliamentary election, the tone of its coverage changed markedly.

== History ==
The first issue of Kurir appeared at newsstands on 6 May 2003. Its origins go back to the state of emergency, declared following the assassination of Serbia's Prime Minister Zoran Đinđić, when another daily tabloid named Nacional was shut down. Using its broad powers under the state of emergency act, the Serbian government's Ministry of Culture and Information headed by Branislav Lečić issued a temporary ban on publication of Nacional daily on 18 March 2003, for "publishing a number of articles relating to the state of emergency and for questioning the reasons behind the state of emergency". On 1 April 2003, the Belgrade city commercial court started liquidation proceedings against Nacional's publisher in Belgrade, Info Orfej. Despite an appeal, the company's equipment, including 118 computers, was seized on 21 April 2003, two days before the state of emergency ended.

Many of the former Nacional staffers found employment in the newly formed Kurir. Businessman Radisav Rodić became its owner. Dragan J. Vučićević, the former deputy editor-in-chief of Nacional who later founded Informer, also moved to Kurir. The new paper closely resembled the old one, both in tone and layout.

In 2005, a group of editors left Kurir and founded the newspaper Press. In 2016, former Kurir editors Milan Ladjević and Saša Milovanović left and founded the Srpski Telegraf paper.

In 2009, Radisav Rodić was arrested on suspicion of tax fraud. After his arrest, his son Aleksandar took over management of the paper. That same year, the "Law on Public Information" was changed drastically to increase fines for media which do not respect the rules of the profession. The change was seen as largely aimed at punishing the tabloid, which had changed its political alliances whenever it suited it.

=== Takeover by Telekom Srbija ===
The paper was later published by Adria Media Group and then by Mondo Inc, part of businessman Igor Žeželj's Wireless Media Group, in which the state-owned Telekom Srbija invested €38 million in 2018. In 2024, Nova reported that Telekom was preparing to take over the company, after amendments to media laws allowed it to buy media outlets. Telekom, in which the Republic of Serbia holds a 58.11% stake, became the majority owner of Mondo Inc with 80% on 31 December 2025, and later its sole owner.

== Editorial stance ==
Kurir has generally been seen as pro-government. It was favourable to the Democratic Party (DS) while it was in power, but after the DS lost the 2012 election to the Serbian Progressive Party (SNS), Kurir switched allegiances and became pro-SNS.

== Criticism and controversies ==
According to the investigative journalist organisation KRIK, Kurir published 104 biased and unfounded front-page articles in its newspaper in 2024.

In February 2020, Serbia's Ministry of Culture and Information announced its intention to sue Kurir over false information published by the tabloid, claiming that it spread "tendentious fabrications" and violates ethical standards.

=== Lawsuits against KRIK, media abuse and political bias ===
Kurir sued KRIK (and other media/NGOs) over an analysis claiming that it had published a large number of unverified, manipulative, or false headlines. The court ruled in favour of KRIK and dismissed the lawsuit, stating that the analysis was part of journalism, not "unreliable competition."

A 2023 report by the Slavko Ćuruvija Foundation stated that Kurir frequently attacked critical media and journalists, using rhetoric that dehumanizes them and labelled them as "traitors" or "mercenaries". According to the analysis, these attacks are part of a broader strategy to influence public opinion and undermine media freedom.

In 2025, the Independent Journalists' Association of Serbia (IJAS) accused Kurir of inciting violence and spreading hatred through articles. According to them, its articles were closer to "political pamphlets" than standard journalism. IJAS called on the Ministry of Information to initiate proceedings against Kurir for violating the Law on Public Information. In October 2025, Kurir described as "a great disgrace" the votes of six MPs, among them Radomir Lazović and Biljana Đorđević of the Green–Left Front, in favour of placing a draft resolution on the Srebrenica genocide on the National Assembly's agenda.

== Kurir TV ==
Kurir TV, registered to Mondo Inc, holds licences for cable, satellite and IPTV distribution, but not for national terrestrial broadcasting. In September 2026, ahead of the parliamentary election, sixteen media, journalists' and civil society organisations asked Telekom Srbija to stop broadcasting Kurir TV and Informer TV on its national terrestrial network, arguing that the channels lacked the necessary licences and that their coverage of the government and the Student List was highly unbalanced.

== 2026 parliamentary election ==
An analysis by the fact-checking portal FakeNews Tragač found that Kurir changed its coverage abruptly after the 2026 Serbian parliamentary election. In the three days before the electoral silence (20–22 October), 54 of the 240 articles in its politics section called candidates or supporters of the Student List "blockaders" (blokaderi), 40 called it the "so-called" list or put its name in quotation marks, 167 portrayed the SNS positively and none negatively, and 116 portrayed the Student List negatively and none positively. In the three days after the election (26–28 October), only three of 113 articles used the term "blockaders", none called the list "so-called", 23 were positive and six negative about the SNS, and most articles about the Student List were neutral. The authors said that the shift looked more like confusion and retreat in the face of possible consequences than a move towards more ethical reporting.

== See also ==
- List of newspapers in Serbia
- Media in Serbia
