= Novosti a.d. =

Serbian media company

- Native name: Новости а.д.
- Company type: Joint-stock company
- Industry: Media
- Founded: 31 December 2001; 24 years ago (Current form); 1953; 73 years ago (Founded)
- Headquarters: Belgrade, Serbia
- Area served: Serbia
- Key people: Olivera Anđelković (Director)
- Products: Newspapers, Radio
- Revenue: ▼€8.69 million (2024)
- Net income: ▼€0.01 million (2024)
- Total assets: ▼€6.02 million (2024)
- Total equity: ▲€1.05 million (2024)
- Owner: Media 026 (100%)
- Number of employees: 190 (2024)
- Website: www.novosti.rs

Novosti a.d (full legal name: Novinsko-izdavačko društvo Kompanija Novosti a.d. Beograd) is a Serbian media company headquartered in Belgrade Serbia.

== History ==
The company was established in 1953. After decades of operating under a self-management model, the company was transferred to state ownership in the 1990s and then partly privatized in the mid-2000s, though the Government of Serbia still held a substantial stake.

As of 2019, among its assets, the company holds high-circulation daily Večernje novosti as well as various periodicals. The company also has Radio Novosti, an FM station heard throughout greater Belgrade.

In August 2019, "Štamparija Borba" sold its majority share stake in Novosti to Smederevo-based "Media 026" for around 2.5 million euros.
