= Gazeta (newspaper) =

Defunct Serbian tabloid newspaper

Gazeta was a tabloid daily newspaper published in Belgrade, Serbia.

Beginning publication on October 22, 2007, it was edited by Antonije Kovačević who previously performed the same position at rival Kurir daily tabloid.

The publication couldn't keep up financially, and on October 31, 2008, it was announced by its editor-in-chief Kovacevic that the November 1st issue would be the last.
