= Informer (newspaper) =

Serbian tabloid newspaper

- The front page on 22 February 2022 proclaiming "Ukraine has attacked Russia"
- Type: Daily newspaper
- Format: Tabloid
- Owner: Insajder tim
- Editor: Dragan J. Vučićević
- Founded: 10 May 2012; 14 years ago
- Political alignment: Pro-SNS; Euroscepticism; Russophilia; Serbian nationalism; Conspiracy theorism
- Headquarters: Terazije 5/7, Belgrade, Serbia
- Country: Serbia
- Circulation: ~102,000 copies distributed (claimed, 2016)
- Website: informer.rs

Informer is a Serbian tabloid newspaper based in Belgrade. It is known for its political bias in favour of the Serbian Progressive Party (SNS), which governed Serbia from 2012 until its defeat in the 2026 Serbian parliamentary election, and for its sensationalist stories. The newspaper has been accused numerous times of spreading disinformation and sensationalism.

As of 2016, it claimed without documentation to be the highest-circulation daily in Serbia, alleging over 100,000 copies distributed daily. The newspaper covers politics, regional and world news, popular culture, health, and sports.

It practises yellow journalism and is notorious for publishing false information, as well as for insulting and discrediting the political opponents of Aleksandar Vučić. It has published articles with chauvinist and sexist biases. According to KRIK, Informer published more than 384 manipulative front-page articles in 2024. It is also known for spreading disinformation about the 2024–2026 Serbian anti-corruption protests. Its sister channel, Informer TV, became the subject of proceedings by the Regulatory Body for Electronic Media (REM) after the 2026 election, following an initiative by civil society and media organisations to revoke its licence.

== Controversies ==
In 2015, Informer manufactured an international scandal by publishing screenshots of a porn video starring American pornographic actress Diamond Foxxx, with accompanying text that falsely alleged the stills were from a sex tape featuring the President of Croatia, Kolinda Grabar-Kitarović. This was "sharply condemned" by Serbian Ministry of Culture and Information, which called for sanctions, as well as by MP Azra Jasavić of neighbouring Montenegro, where the newspaper is also published. Jasavić called for changes in law to prevent Informer from its "brutalisation of women", whom Jasavić said are targeted by the tabloid.

In 2019, EU vs Disinformation reported that Informer was one of the foremost Serbian sources of false narratives and warmongering in 2018. According to Serbian investigative journalism portal Crime and Corruption Reporting Network, more than 700 fake news items were published on the front pages of pro-government tabloids during 2018, led by Informer. Many decried invented attacks on Aleksandar Vučić or attempted coups, as well as supposed messages of support from Russian president Vladimir Putin. In 2020, Twitter shut down a network of 8,500 bots that spammed 43 million tweets; the bots fawned over President Vučić and his party, boosted pro-Vučić content, and attacked his political opponents; Informer links were among the most frequently spammed. On 22 February 2022, two days before the Russian invasion of Ukraine, Informer published a large headline saying that "Ukraine has attacked Russia".

In late September 2022, Informer published an interview with a serial rapist Igor Milošević, who had just been released after having served 15 years in prison. Milošević sent messages to women of Serbia which were widely seen as controversial and that led to citizens' protests, during which Informer's editor-in-chief Dragan J. Vučićević was physically attacked.

During the Russian invasion of Ukraine, Informer has published disinformation on events related to the war.

According to the investigative journalist organisation KRIK, Informer published over 384 disinformation articles in its newspaper in 2024.

In July 2025, the Press Council ruled that Informer violated the Codex of Journalism.

In August 2025, Vučićević showed and commented on private photographs of a female student on Informer TV, which N1 described as live revenge porn.

In October 2025, during a live broadcast, Vučićević referred to the victims of the Novi Sad railway station canopy collapse of 1 November 2024 as "šatro žrtve". (šatro being Serbian slang for "so-called" or "allegedly"). The remark prompted a protest in front of the Informer newsroom on 18 October 2025, where citizens demanded an apology; Vučićević did not apologise.

=== GOSI ===
In July 2025, Informer began attributing some of the photographs, videos and information it published to "GOSI", which it described as its "viewers' information service" (gledalačko-informativna služba), made up of loyal readers. Material attributed to GOSI included surveillance footage of Milomir Jaćimović, a bus operator who supported the student movement and was on hunger strike in Novi Sad in November 2025, which Informer used to claim that the strike was staged; covert photographs of the wife of a detained activist and of a meeting with embassy staff in a Belgrade hotel; and secretly recorded video of special prosecutor Mladen Nenadić at a German embassy event. The fact-checking portal Raskrikavanje considered the claims about the hunger strike unfounded, and argued that ordinary readers were unlikely to have access to such footage, raising concerns that it came from state services. In an earlier lawsuit brought by KRIK editor Stevan Dojčinović over the publication of his private photographs, lawyers for Vučićević admitted that the material had come from the Security Intelligence Agency (BIA). Lawyer Nikola Lakić said that GOSI did not exist and that the police, BIA and the Military Security Agency supplied Vučićević with personal data and investigation materials to discredit critics, citing a statement that Zdravko Ponoš had given to the police, which was read on Informer TV within minutes.

=== Srebrenica resolution ===
In July 2025, after the Movement of Free Citizens (PSG) and two Bosniak parties submitted a draft resolution on the Srebrenica genocide to the National Assembly, Informer called PSG leader Pavle Grbović a "traitor" who "wants to declare Serbs a genocidal people".

== Informer TV ==
Informer also runs a television channel, Informer TV, whose programmes include the talk show Kolegijum hosted by Vučićević. In November 2024, the Regulatory Body for Electronic Media (REM) granted it a regional terrestrial broadcasting licence for Belgrade; in April 2025, it returned the licence, deciding to continue broadcasting via cable under a much cheaper permit. In September 2026, ahead of the parliamentary election, sixteen media, journalists' and civil society organisations asked the state-owned Telekom Srbija to stop broadcasting Informer TV and Kurir TV on its national terrestrial network, arguing that the channels were licensed only for cable, satellite and IPTV distribution, and that their coverage of the government and the Student List was highly unbalanced.

== 2026 parliamentary election and aftermath ==
On the night of the 2026 Serbian parliamentary election, held on 25 October, Vučićević began celebrating a victory for Vučić's list on air, citing partial results from a small number of polling stations, and Informer ran the headline "A cold shower for the blockaders". When Vučić conceded that the Student List had won, Vučićević said: "We expected a different result, but fine, that is life."

On the evening of 26 October, several dozen people entered the Informer TV building and interrupted the live broadcast of Kolegijum. Vučićević called the police and an ambulance, and telephoned Ilija Srdanović, the Student List's lead candidate, asking him to call on the crowd to disperse; Srdanović replied that he first had to check the information. Among those who entered was Dijana Hrka, the mother of one of the victims of the canopy collapse, who demanded an apology from Vučićević for his insults; the staff were evacuated by the police, who pushed back the crowd outside the building. Vučić called the incident "unprecedented violence" and an attack on press freedom, while Students in Blockade said that they did not support or call for incursions into media outlets or institutions, and Srdanović urged citizens to remain calm and refrain from violence.

On 27 October, civil society organisations, journalists' associations and representatives of journalism departments at the universities of Belgrade, Novi Sad and Niš filed an initiative with REM to revoke Informer TV's licence, citing years of systematic violations of the law and programming obligations. On 29 October, the REM Council unanimously launched proceedings against Informer TV over alleged violations during the election campaign. Vučićević said that a ban on broadcasting was being prepared, that the company employed 330 people, and that he would file criminal complaints against those he held responsible. On 3 November, the council held a consultative session and agreed to discuss the first measures against Informer TV the following day; possible measures include a warning or a temporary ban on broadcasting of up to 30 days, while permanent revocation of the licence would require further conditions to be met.

== See also ==
- Propaganda through media
- List of newspapers in Serbia
