= Nacional (newspaper) =

- Type: Daily newspaper
- Format: Tabloid
- Owner: Milorad Antonić
- Publisher: NIP Info Orfej d.o.o.
- Editor: Predrag Popović
- Founded: 4 December 2001; 23 years ago
- Ceased publication: 18 March 2003; 22 years ago
- Political alignment: Sensationalism; Populism

Nacional was a Serbian daily newspaper published in Belgrade from 2001 until 2003.

Owned by the NIP Info Orfej publishing company whose general manager Milorad Antonić previously made a profit on the Belgrade-based Ekskluziv magazine and Bijeljina-based Ekstra magazin, Nacional's first issue appeared on 4 December 2001. Published in the ambitious initial circulation of 60,000 copies, the paper managed to establish itself fairly quickly on the market. With its semi-tabloid content format, the paper's chief editor was Predrag Popović while Dragan J. Vučićević was his deputy. Svetomir Marjanović, another prominent journalist on the Serbian daily tabloid scene was a feature editor.

Nacional was published under the mantra 'Dnevni list Srbije' (Serbia's daily). Visually, the paper was a carbon copy of the Croatian Ninoslav Pavić-owned Jutarnji list daily with almost the same layout and exact same Latin font. Furthermore, its name mirrored that of a Croatian weekly magazine owned by Ivo Pukanić.

The paper was shut down by a government decree during Operation Sablja following the assassination of Zoran Đinđić in March 2003.

== History ==
=== Maršićanin's extramarital affair ===
In 2001, Nacional revealed the fifty-one-year-old Serbian parliamentary speaker Dragan Maršićanin's extramarital affair with a much younger female stenographer employed at the Serbian parliament. After ostensibly being caught by Nacional reporters at Hotel Jugopetrol on Mount Zlatibor, the tabloid ran salacious details of the adulterous relationship for days.

The story appeared against the backdrop of continuous in-fighting among the member parties of the ruling DOS coalition in the wake of an attempt to have Maršićanin removed from the parliamentary speaker position for supposedly breaking procedural rules. The timing of the story's release thus raised suspicion of being politically motivated. Nacional editor-in-chief Predrag Popović later admitted to being tipped off about the Maršićanin story by the Serbian secret police.

In May 2013, while talking about the Serbian tabloids' modus operandi and business model, Serbian Journalists' Association (UNS) president Ljiljana Smajlović referred to Nacional's 2001 Maršićanin story as "the very first instance in Serbia of an important political or business figure undergoing character assassination in the tabloids where the target gets dragged through mud via a sustained campaign that goes on day after day and sometimes even ends up lasting for weeks or months". She added that "the 'success' of the Maršićanin episode—in that those who started it got what they were after as he soon resigned his post and from that point on basically became political roadkill that would within a few years leave politics altogether—led to the same model being replicated over and over again" and that "ever since then, Serbian tabloids have become potent and powerful political tools whereby specific information is leaked to them by the people in positions of power in an effort to incriminate or defame rivals".

In February 2002, the newspaper score a bit of coup when it brought star columnist Bogdan Tirnanić on board.

=== Ljiljana Buha letters and campaign against Zoran Đinđić ===
Throughout 2002, Nacional ran a series of stories painting Serbian prime minister Zoran Đinđić in extremely negative light. They started with a piece claiming Đinđić rang in New Year 2002 at a lavish party in Dubai where the bill got footed by known criminals and fugitives from Serbian justice system. Later that year, the paper began publishing a series of letters supposedly written by Ljiljana Buha, estranged wife of politically connected Serbian businessman with underworld ties Ljubiša "Čume" Buha, in which she purportedly claims that Serbian organized crime has infiltrated the highest levels of political power in Serbia, specifically singling out prime minister Đinđić and his political circle of friends and allies.

Though most of the claims from Nacional's Ljiljana Buha letters were in time proven to be either exaggerations or outright fabrications, including strong likelihood that the letters weren't even written by Ljiljana Buha but by members of the Zemun Clan, the letters managed their primary aim of politically damaging Đinđić and his government.

More details of the entire episode came out over the years since. In Miloš Vasić's 2005 book Atentat, the 2001-2003 Serbian deputy prime minister Čedomir Jovanović claimed that during the publishing of the Buha letters and accompanying anti-Đinđić pieces, Nacional editor-in-chief Predrag Popović met with Đinđić in October 2002 "admitting to the prime minister sheepishly and remorsefully that he had been paid to publish the Ljiljana Buha letters because he needs to make a living before offering to stop the whole thing for €50,000". Jovanović added that Đinđić agreed to pay up, but that the Nacional campaign against him continued.

=== Banned by government and folding ===
On 18 March 2003, using its broad powers under the state of emergency act, Serbian government's Ministry of Culture and Information headed by Branislav Lečić issued a temporary ban on publication of Nacional due to "publishing a number of articles relating to the state of emergency and for questioning the reasons behind the state of emergency". Then on 1 April 2003, the Belgrade city commercial court started liquidation proceedings against Nacional's publisher in Belgrade, Info Orfej. Despite the fact that they were not met either one of three possible conditions for liquidation of company, that company, by the annual accounts have expressed a profit of around 23 million dinars, that all contributions was paid, the company was liquidated, and 50 employees for indefinite time (of which 32 journalist) and 72 associates, lost their jobs and the means of work (118 computers, 120 desks and other equipment for communications). The company was seized on 21 April 2003, two days before the state of emergency ended. After a year, the Supreme Commercial Court abolished liquidation and the Constitutional Court of Serbia announced that the decision of quench of the media in the state of emergency was unconstitutional.
