= 24 sata (Serbia) =

Weekly free newspaper in Belgrade, Serbia

- Type: Free weekly newspaper
- Format: Tabloid
- Founded: November 2006; 19 years ago
- Headquarters: Žorža Klemansoa 19, Belgrade, Serbia
- Website: www.24online.info

24 sata (24 hours) was a weekly free newspaper in Belgrade, founded by Ringier in October 2006. It used to have circulation figures of around 150,000. On April 1, 2011, the 1,167th issue of the newspaper was published. This newspaper had sections about local news, national news for Serbia, global news, advertisements, economic news, sports and shopping. This newspaper was free and could have been found in shopping malls, bus stations and other places, in the morning.

It features a great deal of advertising content, which is the newspaper's main source of income.
