= Politika a.d. =

Serbian media corporation

- Native name: Политика а.д.
- Company type: Joint-stock company
- Traded as: BELEX: PLTK
- Industry: Newspapers, Radio broadcasting
- Genre: News media
- Founded: 31 October 1998; 27 years ago (Current form); 25 January 1904; 122 years ago (Founded)
- Founder: Vladislav F. Ribnikar
- Headquarters: Belgrade, Serbia
- Key people: Zoran Mošorinski (General director)
- Products: Politika, Sportski žurnal, Ilustrovana politika, Svet kompjutera, Politikin zabavnik, Bazar
- Revenue: ▼€5.39 million (2024)
- Net income: ▲ (€12.08 million) (2024)
- Total assets: ▼€21.26 million (2024)
- Total equity: ▲ (-€40.66 million) (2024)
- Owner: Pension Fund (29.45); Government of Serbia (18.56%); Akcionarski Fond a.d. (10.06%); RFZO (10.00%); Others (as of 27 April 2025)
- Number of employees: 186 (2024)
- Website: www.politika-ad.com

Politika a.d. (full legal name: Politika a.d. Beograd) (BELEX: PLTK) is a Serbian media corporation founded in present form in 2005, and it has continually existed in various legal forms since 1904.

It is majority owned by the Government of Serbia and companies in which it has majority of shares.

== Management ==
The company is run by a 10-member Managing Board and 4-member Executive Board. The Managing Board is composed of the following individuals:

- Darko Ribnikar
- Zeferino Grasi
- Srećko Bugarinović
- Danilo Jakić
- Zoran Mašorinski
- Jasmina Mitrović-Marić
- Slobodan Bogunović
- Kosta Sandić
- Nemanja Stevanović
- Suzana Vasiljević

The board is structured such that one member is the government's representative, one member represents small shareholders, a number may be proposed by the government, and all board members need to be confirmed by a shareholder's meeting.

== Assets ==
=== Politika Newspapers & Magazines ===
Since 2002, together with German madia concern WAZ, Politika AD maintains a 50-50 joint venture called Politika Newspapers & Magazines that's registered as a limited liability company. That joint entity controls two daily newspapers (Politika, Sportski žurnal), and eight periodical publications (Ilustrovana politika, Svet kompjutera, Ana, Viva (discontinued), Bazar, Enigmatika, Huper (discontinued mid-December 2008), Politikin zabavnik, and Razbibriga). The same joint venture also owns a large printing facility using Komori technology controlled through a company called Politika stamparija d.o.o. as well as a large distribution network.

=== RTV Politika ===
Politika AD also owned controlling stake (50.97%) in RTV Politika, local radio-television broadcaster seen and heard throughout city of Belgrade and surrounding municipalities that eventually stopped broadcasting in 2007.
