= Blueprint for Revolution =

2015 book by Srđa Popović

- First edition
- Author: Srdja Popovic, Matthew Miller
- Language: English
- Subject: Political science
- Published: 2015; Spigel & Grau Trade
- Publication place: United States of America
- ISBN: 978-0-8129-9530-5

Blueprint for Revolution: How to Use Rice Pudding, Lego Men, and Other Nonviolent Techniques to Galvanize Communities, Overthrow Dictators, or Simply Change the World is a book written by Srđa Popović, the founder of the Centre for Applied Nonviolent Action and Strategies (CANVAS). The book is described on its back cover as "a handbook for anyone who wants to effectively (and peacefully) improve your neighborhood, make a difference in your community, or change the world."

== Synopsis ==
The first part of the book discusses modern nonviolent revolutions, and the second explains how nonviolent techniques can be put to good use. The book contains eleven chapters, each with a lesson about nonviolent techniques for revolution, including case studies. Popovic writes in the first-person voice, describing his experiences in taking part in and training activists for several revolutions, including the Otpor! movement and the Arab Spring. He references movements that attempted to make changes (successfully and unsuccessfully), such as Occupy Wall Street and Gay Rights Movements. In referencing these movements, Popovic explains the tactics they allude to that make revolutions successful—such as laughtivism and unity—and why they are a better alternative to violence.

== Reception ==
Blueprint for Revolution has received generally positive reviews. Michael Andor Brodeur from The Boston Globe expressed that "despite Popovic’s persistent ham factor (at times, the implied laugh track feels out of place), he offers a clear, well-constructed, and easily applicable set of principles for any David facing any Goliath (sans slingshot, of course)." New York Times writer Tina Rosenberg expressed that "Popovic cheerfully blows up just about every idea most people hold about nonviolent struggle." The book inspired much international praise as well. Duncan Green from The Guardian reviewed the book in the United Kingdom, calling it "fantastically readable and useful [...] for activists." The book also appeared on lists of top human rights books.

== Editions ==
Blueprint for Revolution was originally published in the United States. It has been published in Canada, Australia, the United Kingdom, Germany, France, Turkey, Hungary and Serbia, and has been translated into French, German, Serbian, and Korean.

== Tour and promotion ==
Popovic held a book tour to promote Blueprint for Revolution, visiting Harvard University and Northeastern University, the Frontline Club and Conway Hall in London. Popovic also spoke at Google Ideas about the book, followed by a similar talk at Harvard Kennedy School's Carr Center for Human Rights Policy. Further into the book tour, Popovic was interviewed by German news stations Süddeutsche Zeitung and 3sat, as well as by satirical newspaper Charlie Hebdo. Libération newspaper featured a section describing both Popovic and Blueprint for Revolution.
