= Smajlović =

Smajlović or Smailović is a Bosnian surname. Notable people with the surname include:

- Vedran Smailović (born 1956), Bosnian musician
- Ljiljana Smajlović (born 1956), Serbian journalist
- Meliha Smajlović (born 1993), Bosnian-Turkish volleyball player
- Mišo Smajlović (born 1938), Bosnian football manager and a former player
