= Free Your Mind (MTV award) =

Free Your Mind is an award granted by MTV during its shows in order to award actions or promotion towards social ethics such as human right protection, political and civil law enforcement or environmental protection. The awards are given to non-governmental organizations as well as individuals. The granted award is also provided financial assistance and campaign promotion on MTV's channels.

== MTV Europe Music Awards ==
Year	Recipient	Notes
1994	Amnesty International	For preventing and end grave abuses of human rights and to demand justice for those whose rights have been violated.
1995	Greenpeace	For their campaign against underground nuclear testing.
1996	The Buddies and Carers of Europe	For support their HIV-positive friends.
1997	Landmine Survivors Network	For helping survivors to recover from war, rebuild their communities, and break cycles of violence.
1998	B92	For the journalism and fighting for human rights.
1999	Bono	For his world peace work.
2000	Otpor!	For their role in the successful overthrow of Slobodan Milošević in October 2000.
2001	Treatment Action Campaign	For doing extraordinary work around HIV/AIDS in South Africa.
2002	FARE	For countering racism and xenophobia in European football.
2003	Aung San Suu Kyi	For leading the Burmese democracy movement.
2004	La Strada	For the organization's dedication to the fight against the trafficking of women and girls in Europe.
2005	Bob Geldof	For his charity work organizing the Live 8 concerts.
2007	Anton Abele	For his work against street violence following Riccardo Campogiani's death.
2009	Mikhail Gorbachev	For his involvement in the fall of the Berlin Wall.
2010	Shakira	For her continuing dedication to improve access to education for all children around the world.

== MTV Australia Awards ==
Year	Recipient	Notes
2005	AusAID	For the efforts of over 400 AusAID funded Australian aid workers to tsunami-affected countries.
2006	Peter Garrett	

== MTV Russia Music Awards ==
Year	Recipient
2004	Vladimir Posner
2005	Valery Gazzaev
2006	Crew of the sailfish "Kruzenshtern"

== MTV Romania Music Awards ==
Year	Recipient	Notes
2003	Matei-Agathon Dan	For the Romanian seaside in 2002.
2004	McCann Erickson	For change the situation of Roma communities in Romania through an information and awareness campaign.
2006	United Nations	For the work of the UNDP project "Support to Training of Public Managers through Romanian Government Special Scholarships”.
