= Borba (newspaper) =

Yugoslav and Serbian newspaper

Борба Borba
- Front page of the first issue (19 February 1922)
- Type: Weekly (1922–1929); (1942–1943); Three times a week (1941); Daily newspaper (1944–2009); Monthly (2020–)
- Format: Berliner
- Founder: Communist Party of Yugoslavia
- Founded: 19 February 1922; 104 years ago
- Headquarters: Zagreb (1922–1929); Užice (1941); Drinić (1942–1943); Priluka (1943); Belgrade (1944–2009, 2020–)
- ISSN: 0350-7440
- OCLC number: 12303752
- Website: borba.rs

Borba (Serbo-Croatian Cyrillic: Борба) was a newspaper published in Yugoslavia and Serbia, best known from the period when it was the official gazette of the League of Communists of Yugoslavia (LCY) until 1954 and Socialist Alliance of Working People of Yugoslavia thereon until its dissolution. Its name is the Serbo-Croatian word for 'fight' or 'combat'.

== History ==
=== Beginnings and censorship ===
The first issue of Borba was published in Zagreb on 19 February 1922. Đuro Cvijić and Kamil Horvatin were the editors of the newspaper at its founding. It was the official gazette of the League of Communists of Yugoslavia (LCY), a banned political organization since December 1920 that nevertheless operated clandestinely in the Kingdom of Serbs, Croats and Slovenes and later Kingdom of Yugoslavia. From 1924, the editor of Borba was Vladimir Ćopić, who was soon arrested for his articles against the government. Functioning as the banned Yugoslav Communist Party's propaganda piece, the paper played in important part in disseminating information among the party members, activists, and sympathizers.

On 13 January 1929, a week following the proclamation of King Alexander's 6 January Dictatorship, Borba was banned.

=== World War 2 ===
During World War II Borba was published in the Republic of Užice. After the World War II liberation by the Partisans, its publication moved to Belgrade.

=== Post-war period ===
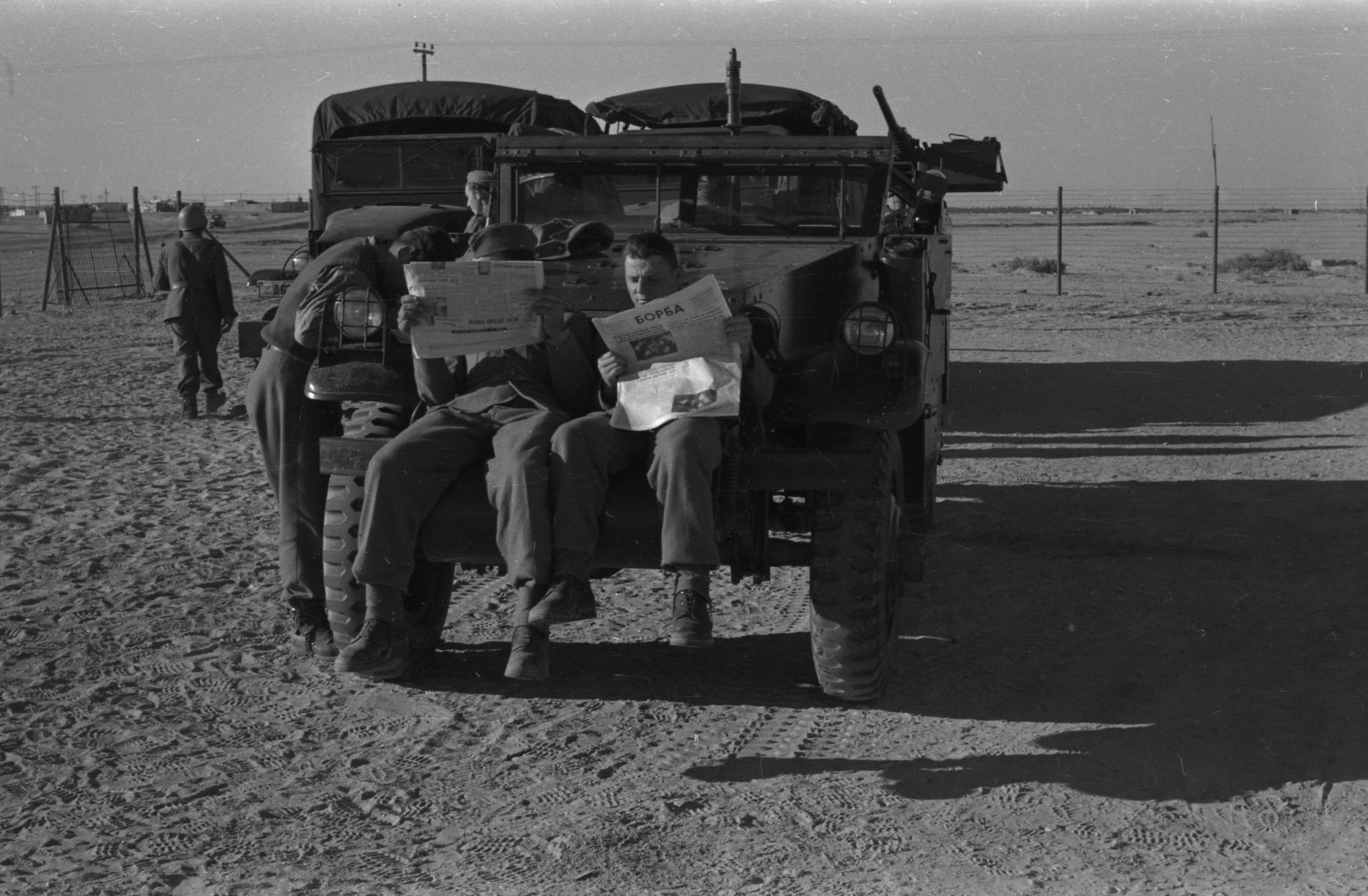
United Nations Emergency Force soldier reading "Borba" during the Suez Crisis.

From 1948 to 1987, the newspaper was also published simultaneously in Zagreb. For a long time, Borba alternated pages in Serbian Cyrillic alphabet and Gaj's Latin alphabet in the same edition.

=== Changes in editorial policy, Yugoslav Wars and ownership changes ===
In July 1986, Stanislav Staša Marinković became the editor-in-chief of Borba, and soon afterwards, he started rebranding the anachronistic Communist government newspaper into one of the most liberal daily newspapers in Yugoslavia. After Marinković's death in 1989, Manojlo Vukotić kept the same policy, so in the beginning of the Yugoslav Wars, Borba journalists took an anti-war stance, and in 1992 and 1993 Borba became one of the most important strongholds of the opponents to Slobodan Milošević war policies. In 1993, after an internal conflict, Vukotić is replaced by Slavko Ćuruvija, and in 1994, government took over Borba overnight, changing the editorial staff, and 120 Borba employees left the magazine, which, after that, became the proponent of Milošević's regime under the new editor Dragutin Brčin. Yet the core of Borba journalists continued publishing different anti-Milošević publications - soon after the 1994 government takeover, a group of former Borba journalists started publishing Naša borba. In 1997, most of the Naša borba journalists established Danas, which is still published today. In 1996, former Borba editor Manojlo Vukotić started Blic, which is also still published today, and in the same year Slavko Ćuruvija started publishing Dnevni telegraf, which was published until Ćuruvija's assassination in March 1999.

Meanwhile, Borba's reputation rapidly deteriorated under Brčin, and the newspaper lost almost entire readership in a few years. After the 2000 overthrow of Slobodan Milošević, Borba had to face complete transformation. In 2002, Borba along with its distribution network were purchased by Serbian businessman Stanko "Cane" Subotić who bought the government shares in the paper. However, under Subotić, the daily Borba barely survived, printing no more than several hundred copies a day while according to business records, the company's monthly revenues never exceeded €30,000.

=== 2009 redesign and cease of publication ===
Redesigned Borba got announced in December 2008 with Ivan Radovanović presented as the paper's new owner after reportedly buying it from fugitive Serbian businessman Stanko "Cane" Subotić. Before the first issue of the redesigned paper appeared, Serbian deputy prime minister Mlađan Dinkić accused Subotić of still being Borba's true owner with Radovanović only serving as the front man.

Though announced for December, the first redesigned issue ended up appearing on newsstands on 15 January 2009 under editor-in-chief Miloš Jevtović who came over from the state-owned Tanjug news agency. It was published by "Izdavačko preduzeće Novine Borba" using the Latin alphabet. Content-wise, the paper's new format was conceived as something new on the Serbian print media market with no news wire items and press releases with only analysis of the current events as well as ongoing political and social trends. Initial editor-in-chief Jevtović was soon replaced with Olivera Zekić. However, the paper sold poorly (less than 3,000 copies per day), ceasing publication in October 2009 after less than a year.

=== 2020 reestablishment ===
In 2020, Borba started publishing once again, as a monthly magazine dedicated to culture, art and promoting traditional and conservative values. Although the magazine had government support and in 2021 celebrated its 99th anniversary, the former journalists and editors of Borba strongly criticized this publication. Radomir Ličina, who was a Borba journalist and editor from 1969 to 1994, said he felt "nothing but disgust at the attempts to ruthlessly appropriate something that belonged only to people who for decades devotedly defended and advocated clear and recognizable journalistic principles and lasting and unchanging civic and human values even in the most difficult of times".

In February 2022, both newly formed Borba magazine and several different groups of former Borba journalists organized gatherings commemorating 100th anniversary of the first issue of Borba.
