= Telegraf =

Telegraf may refer to:

- Dnevni telegraf (1996–1999), a Serbian daily newspaper
- Telegraf (Baltimore newspaper) (1909–1951), an American weekly newspaper
- Telegrafi (founded 2006), a newspaper published in Kosovo
- Telegraphy, various telegraph technologies for the long-distance transmission of messages
