= Evropljanin =

Discontinued bi-weekly newsmagazine in Serbia during the 1990s

Evropljanin (The European) was a bi-weekly newsmagazine published in Serbia during the late 1990s. Launched in April 1998, it was visually modeled after the German newsmagazine Focus.

Owned by Slavko Ćuruvija and published under the "Moderni srpski nedeljnik" mantra, the magazine had a strongly independent editorial policy when it came to reporting on current events in FR Yugoslavia. At times, the magazine took a clear and direct anti-Milošević stance meaning it often found itself at odds with the highest echelons of government. That eventually led to fines and Ćuruvija's brutal murder. Notable Serbian journalists such as Aleksandar Tijanić, Ljiljana Smajlović, Goranka Matić, Dragan Babić, Bogdan Tirnanić, Voja Žanetić, Jelena Kosanić, and Dragan Bujošević (who was also editor-in-chief) wrote for Evropljanin.

What turned out to be the magazine's last issue came out on 19 March 1999.
