= Predrag Koraksić Corax =

Serbian political caricaturist (1933–2026)

- Предраг Кораксић Коракс
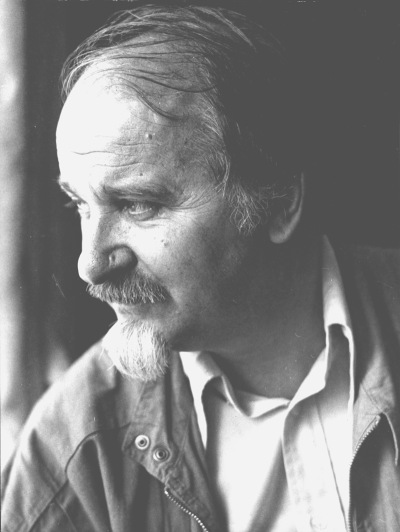
- Born: 15 June 1933; Gornja Gorevnica, Kingdom of Yugoslavia
- Died: 16 May 2026 (aged 92); Belgrade, Serbia
- Occupation: Political cartoonist
- Years active: 1950–2026
- Spouse: Branislava Koraksić
- Children: 2

Predrag Koraksić Corax (Serbian: Предраг Кораксић Коракс; 15 June 1933 – 16 May 2026) was a Serbian political cartoonist.

== Background ==
Koraksić was born in Gornja Gorevnica, near Čačak, on 15 June 1933. His parents were Stojan and Zorka (née Borić), who were teachers. His father, who was also one of the Partisan Movement leaders, was killed during World War II by Chetniks in 1941. Corax spent four years as a refugee.

After the war Corax graduated from the grammar school in Zemun and studied architecture in Belgrade, but dropped out in his third year of studies. Corax started his professional cartoonist career in 1950 in newspaper Jež. Afterwards, Corax worked for Večernje novosti, from which he was expelled after the court process in 1993.

From 1989 on, Corax worked for the independent newspaper Borba, but moved to Danas, where he still worked, when Borba was taken over by the Serbian government. From 1990 until 2005 he was working for magazine Vreme, where he was a member of the editorial board.

Koraksić Corax was married to Branislava (née Galić), with whom he had two children. He died on 16 May 2026, at the age of 92.

== Cartoons ==
Corax's cartoons are humorous accounts of contemporary, mostly Serbian, political events. He rarely uses any written text in his cartoons, but relies on caricatures of politicians for the message to be self-explanatory. His strips are currently being published frequently by Serbian newspaper Danas.

He was a prominent cartoonist in Serbia, as his cartoons are published in well known publications and his style is easily recognized. He also published several books, among which are: the "Past Continuous Tense" (Serbian: "Trajno prošlo vreme") and the "Phenomenon of Rusty Spoon" (Serbian: "Fenomenologija zarđale kašike"), covering political life in Serbia from 1990 to 2016 in caricatures form. For his works he said that throughout his career: "(he) took care that the caricature should not offend anyone, not to be excessive, not to insult, but to be ridicule, irony, that a person laughs". Commenting on inspiration for making cartoons about politicians, he said: "I've been always driven mad by arrogance, which is actually a dominant characteristic of those people, ruthlessness, lies, deceit... and especially nationalism."

Throughout career, his sarcastic cartoons about politicians have offended many high-ranking officials of Serbia—including Dobrica Ćosić, Slobodan Milošević and Vojislav Koštunica, and in recent years Aleksandar Vučić—causing them to often publicly criticize his work. From time to time, political leaders have also tried to censor his work following the provocative cartoons aimed at them, by replacing main editors in newspapers where he worked or by cancelling his art exhibitions in public libraries without proper explanation.

== Awards ==
In October 2004, he was awarded the French Légion d'honneur. In December 2017, he was awarded "Dobar primer Novog Optimizma" award.
