= Laughtivism =

Humor and mocking by social nonviolent movements

Laughtivism (a portmanteau of laughter+ activism) is strategic use of humor and mocking by social nonviolent movements in order to undermine the authority of an opponent, build credibility, break fear and apathy and reach target audiences. It has been defined, and predominantly practiced independently, by two activist groups - The Center for Applied Nonviolent Actions and Strategies (CANVAS) based in Belgrade, Serbia (Executive Director Srđa Popović) as well as the New York-based team the Yes Men. Some recent examples of Laughtivism include: The Yes Men creating a false movie production company comparing the Midwestern Tar Sands area to Mordor, and Egyptian comedian Bassem Youssef's satirical television show The B+ which made fun of events during the Egyptian Revolution in 2011.

For more examples of Laughtivism see "Why Dictators Don't Like Jokes", by Srdja Popovic and Mladen Joksic. For a critical view of Laughtivism see "Two Cheers for Laughtivism", by Kei Hiruta.

== See also ==
- Otpor!
- Bringing Down a Dictator
- Albert Einstein Institution
