= Stureby murder =

2009 child murder in Sweden

Coordinates: 59°16′54″N 18°03′57″E

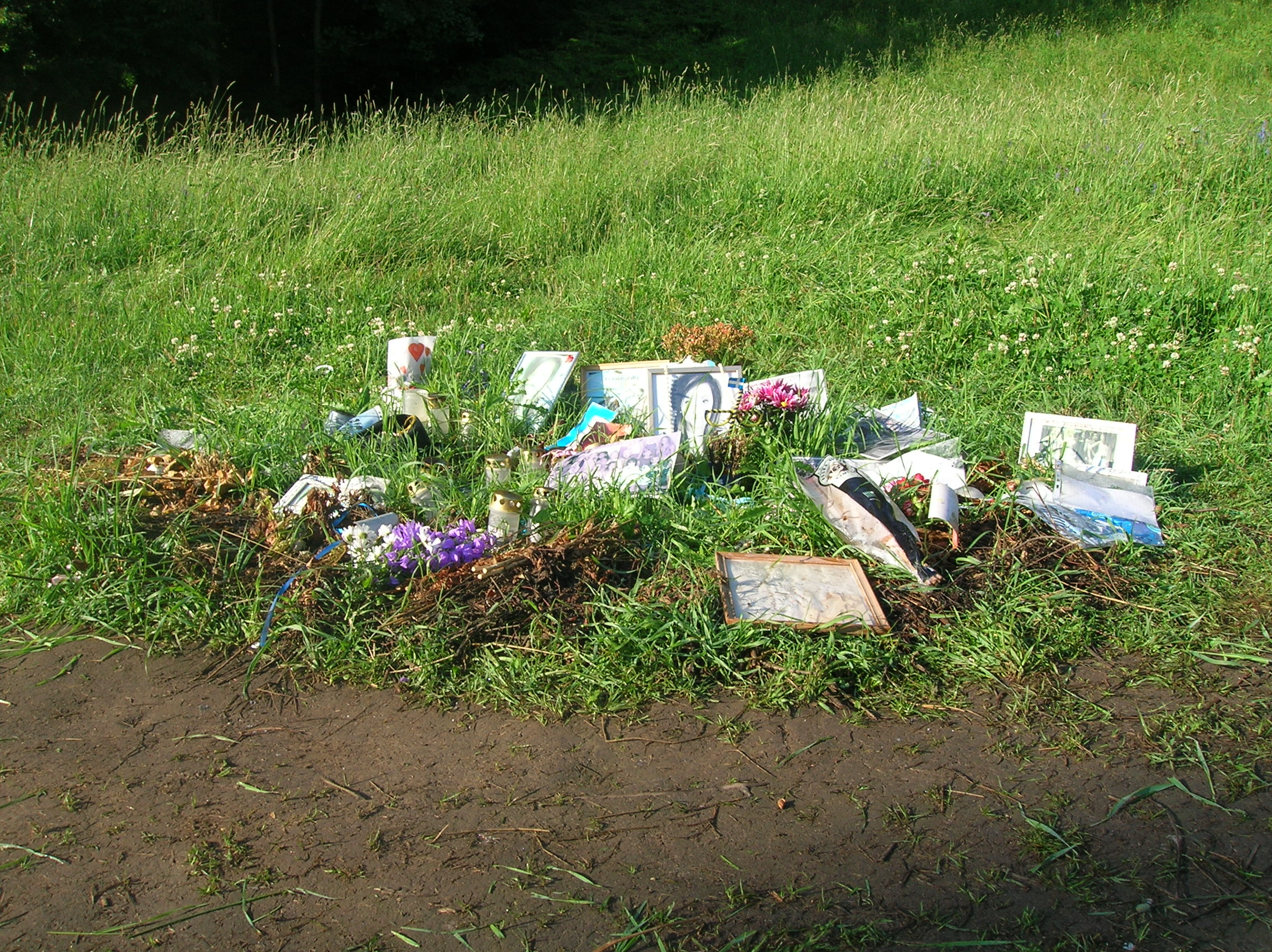
A memorial for Therese Johansson Rojo at the place of her murder.

The Stureby murder occurred on the night between 6 and 7 June 2009, when 15-year-old Therese Johansson Rojo (born 17 June 1993) was strangled to death in Stureby, located outside of Stockholm, Sweden, by a 16-year-old schoolmate. The killer, who eventually admitted to the murder, and his girlfriend, of the same age, who had conspired with him, were arrested the following day.

The girl had convinced the boy via text messages, telephone calls and chat room contact to kill Therese during the weeks leading up to the murder.

== Events of 6 and 7 June 2009 ==
On the evening of 6 June, Therese and the boy both attended an open air National Day party. Around midnight, he lured her into a forest where he hit her in the back with a tree branch and then strangled her to death. The boy and the girl who were charged with the murder were a couple and Therese had kissed the boy during a party a month earlier. The murderer was encouraged by his girlfriend through texting and chatroom contact to commit the murder to prove his love and win back his girlfriend.

== Sentencing ==
Because of their young age, the two teenagers received twenty months imprisonment apiece in a special care home. The girl appealed her sentence, delaying the implementation of her sentence until the appeal was considered by the court.

The prosecution also appealed the sentencing decision, but in February 2010, the appeals court rejected this and upheld the original sentencing. Both teenagers were scheduled to be released in summer of 2011.

The sentences received a great deal of criticism from both the Swedish media and from the population at large, and calls were made to change Swedish legislation's sentencing guidelines for young offenders, given that the maximum sentence for a young offender is four years in custody. Sentencing guidelines were at the time under review, but had generally favored life imprisonment (possible only for offenders over 21 years) for premeditated murder, barring mitigating circumstances. While Sweden technically lacks the availability of release through parole, it is possible to have the sentence converted to a timed sentence, followed by release upon completion. The timed sentence can extend to any length, but is typically set to ensure release after about 14 to 16 years. For adults over 21, the effective penalty would thus likely have been seven to nine times the time served by the young couple.

== Aftermath ==
Five days after the murder, Aftonbladet initiated a campaign called "Glöm inte Therese, which gave money to the help organisation BRIS. Murder victim Riccardo Campogiani's parents supported the campaign. The murder became the most noted murder in Sweden during 2009.
