= Slavko Ćuruvija =

Serbian journalist (1949–1999)

Slavko Ćuruvija Славко Ћурувија
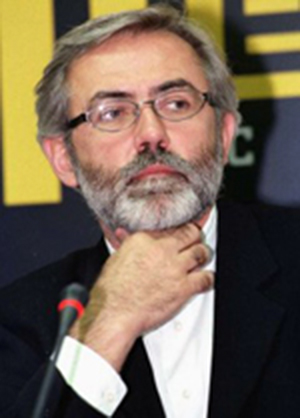
- Born: 9 August 1949; Zagreb, PR Croatia, FPR Yugoslavia
- Died: 11 April 1999 (aged 49); Belgrade, Serbia, FR Yugoslavia
- Cause of death: Gunshot wounds
- Education: University of Belgrade
- Occupations: Journalist, publisher
- Partner: Branka Prpa

Slavko Ćuruvija (Serbian Cyrillic: Славко Ћурувија, pronounced [slâːʋko tɕurǔʋija]; 9 August 1949 – 11 April 1999) was a Yugoslav and Serbian journalist and newspaper publisher. His murder on 11 April 1999 in Belgrade provoked international outrage and wide condemnation.

== Early life and career ==
Born to Rade Ćuruvija, an ethnic Serb officer of the Yugoslav People's Army (JNA) who spent World War II fighting in Lika on the Partisan side, Slavko was born and grew up in Zagreb. In addition to holding JNA rank, his father also worked for JNA's Counterintelligence Service (KOS) and Directorate for State Security (UDBA). The family moved to Belgrade in 1958. His parents divorced in 1965.

After graduating from the Faculty of Political Sciences, University of Belgrade, Ćuruvija found employment as a business secretary and PR assistant at Mašinogradnja in Belgrade. He soon began contributing to Zagreb's Danas weekly magazine, as well as to the Social Research Center (Centar za društvena istraživanja). Between 1984 and 1986, he worked as analyst in the Federal Interior Secretariat and State Security Service.

== Career in journalism ==
In 1986, Ćuruvija joined the staff of Borba: initially as commentator, then advancing to the position of domestic political section editor, and eventually becoming Borba's editor-in-chief. In 1987 he was one of the few journalists allowed to stand next to Slobodan Milošević during his visit to Kosovo Polje on 24 April. He stayed with the daily paper until 1994 while regularly contributing to Vjesnik, NIN, Večernji list, Pobjeda, TV Belgrade, and other media sources.

In 1994, after the regime's unofficial takeover at Borba, Ćuruvija, along with many other staffers decided to leave the daily. While some of them quickly reconvened to form Naša borba, Ćuruvija took another career route, hooking up with Momčilo Đorgović to found Nedeljni telegraf, a weekly tabloid newspaper. In 1996, the duo founded Dnevni telegraf, Serbia's first privately owned daily in more than 50 years. Ćuruvija was DT's director and editor-in-chief, and eventually, after splitting with Đorgović, its sole owner. In 1998, Ćuruvija additionally founded a bi-weekly magazine Evropljanin where he gathered some prominent Serbian journalists, including Aleksandar Tijanić and Ljiljana Smajlović.

=== Relations with regime ===
Both Ćuruvija-owned publications benefited from his access to Mira Marković, wife of Serbian president Slobodan Milošević. Not many specific, established details indicating the extent of their relationship are known. Most come from second or third hand accounts. Radio Television of Serbia produced a television documentary Kad režim strelja (2006), Aleksandar Tijanić refers to it as a "non-aggression pact between Mira and Slavko allowing him access to many relevant pieces of information that ultimately greatly increased Dnevni telegraf's readership", while Ćuruvija's common-law wife Branka Prpa who was with him at the time of his murder attaches less significance to this friendship saying that it "revolved around conversations that many other journalists engaged in with Mira Marković hoping to manipulate her into revealing more than she'd originally planned". Prpa went on to add: "However, I think they became the ones being manipulated as the time went on".

Whatever it was, their relationship was deteriorating by the day in late summer and early fall of 1998. Yugoslav army and Serbian police were in various stages of a crackdown on ethnic Albanians in Kosovo, and both of Ćuruvija's publications reported extensively on all of these issues, all of which earned Dnevni telegraf a ban on 14 October 1998 under a special new decree. Furious with these new developments, Ćuruvija demanded to see Mira Marković and a meeting was arranged at her party's (Yugoslav Left) offices during the week Dnevni telegraf was banned as the new Information Law was being prepared. The meeting, reportedly quickly turned into a heated exchange. Branka Prpa, Ćuruvija's common-law wife, and Ljiljana Smajlović, co-worker, said that one of the things that got him in trouble with the Milošević regime was the article about Attack on Prekaz because he didn't call all killed Kosovo Albanians “terrorists”.

According to Predrag Popović's book Oni ne praštaju (written from the author's subsequent interviews with Ćuruvija), Ćuruvija was shouting: "What the hell do you think you're doing. If you continue down this crazy path, you can be sure you'll all be hanging off lamp posts in Terazije". Visibly flustered, Mira reportedly responded: "How can you say that Slavko, after all we've allowed you". Slavko's later comment was also published in the book: "Evidently she thought she'd done me a great favour by allowing me to live a normal life and publish newspapers all those years". The meeting, their last ever, ended with Ćuruvija saying: "Say hello to your husband for me." To which [a] visibly shaken up Mira responded: "I will not do that, but I will tell him everything you said." People who happened to be in the building said Mira Marković was crying after the meeting.

In April 2006 article on B92 TV commemorating 7 years since the unsolved murder of Ćuruvija, his wife Branka Prpa recounted few more details of the Ćuruvija-Marković exchange: "He was shouting 'What are you doing this for? You're going to cause a widespread war!' Mira then told him 'Oh, so you want them to bomb us.' He responded 'Well, maybe they should bomb you, it's the only way for us to finally get you out of power!".

=== Evropljanin trial on 23 October 1998 ===
Ćuruvija's response to the unpleasant exchange was a scathing blast about the couple on the pages of Evropljanin, co-written with Aleksandar Tijanić. The issue came out on 19 October 1998, one day before the Information Law was passed, which did not stop the authorities from putting Ćuruvija and his paper on trial four days later and prosecuting them under the same law. The culmination of the day-long trial was a DM350,000 fine.

== Death ==
On 11 April 1999 (which was Easter Sunday in the Serbian Orthodox Church that year), Ćuruvija was shot dead by two masked men in front of his house in Belgrade. The Serbian government began a review on 24 January 2013 of several suspicious cases involving the alleged murders of journalists, including Ćuruvija, Milan Pantić, and Dada Vujasinović.

== Aftermath ==
Aleksandar Vučić, who was Minister for Information in Serbian government at the time of Ćuruvija's murder, announced on 12 November 2013 on Utisak nedelje that there had been a recent progress in the investigation of the murder of Ćuruvija..

On 14 January 2014, Serbian police arrested two suspects in Ćuruvija's murder case, Milan Radonjić and Ratko Romić, both formerly employed by the Second department of State Security Directorate.

Radomir Marković, former head of Federal Republic of State Security Service currently serving a 40-year term for orchestrating a 1999 attack on Serbian opposition leaders Vuk Drašković, and Miroslav Kurak, currently at large, are also suspects, the former for allegedly ordering the murder and the latter for being the alleged executor. The formal accusation for the murder was expected by February 2014, the key witness for the prosecution being Milorad Ulemek Legija, former commander of Special Operations Unit of the Serbian secret police.

The former Serbian secret agent Ratko Ljubojević told a Belgrade Special Court in January 2016 that all reports concerning Ćuruvija were ordered destroyed on 5 October 2000, the day Slobodan Milošević fell from power.

In 2021, four former intelligence officers were convicted of Ćuruvija's murder and sentenced to long prison terms. However, the verdicts were reversed on appeal in 2024, which led to the acquittal of the four.

== See also ==
- List of journalists killed in Europe

== Links ==
- Sahranjen Slavko Ćuruvija, Vreme.com, 17 April 1999. (in Serbian)
