= Centre for Applied Nonviolent Action and Strategies =

Educational institute

- Abbreviation: CANVAS
- Formation: 2004; 22 years ago
- Founder: Srđa Popović, Slobodan Đinović
- Headquarters: Belgrade
- Location: Serbia
- Region served: International

The Centre for Applied Nonviolent Action and Strategies (CANVAS) is a non-profit, non-governmental, educational institution focused on the use of nonviolent conflict, based in Belgrade, Serbia. It was founded in 2004 by Srđa Popović and the CEO of Orion Telecom, Slobodan Đinović. Both were former members of the Serbian youth resistance movement, Otpor!, which supported the overthrow of Slobodan Milošević in October 2000. Drawing upon the Serbian experience, CANVAS seeks to educate pro-democracy activists around the world in what it regards as the universal principles for success in nonviolent struggle.

Established in Belgrade, CANVAS has worked with pro-democracy activists from more than 50 countries, including Iran, Zimbabwe, Burma, Venezuela, Ukraine, Georgia, Palestine, Western Sahara, West Papua, Eritrea, Belarus, Azerbaijan and Tonga and, recently, Tunisia and Egypt.

CANVAS' training and methodology has been successfully applied by groups in Georgia (2003), Ukraine (2004), Lebanon (2005), The Maldives (2008)?, Egypt (2011)?, Syria (2011)? and Ukraine (2014). It works only in response to requests for assistance.

== Mission ==
Srđa Popović said:

"The core of CANVAS’s work is rather to spread the word of "people power" to the world than to achieve victories against one dictator or another. CANVAS' big mission is to explain to the world what a powerful tool nonviolent struggle is when it comes to achieving freedom, democracy and human rights."

== Origins ==
CANVAS was established in Belgrade in 2004. Its founding members, Slobodan Đinović and Srđa Popović, were leaders of the Serbian youth resistance movement Otpor! (Serbian for Resistance!), which played an instrumental role in deposing Slobodan Milošević in 2000. CANVAS sees itself as the successor to a host of non-violent campaigners, from India's Mahatma Gandhi to America's Martin Luther King Jr. CANVAS has become known for its work with nonviolent democratic movements worldwide through the transfer of knowledge on strategies and tactics of nonviolent struggle.

Its mission is a world where political change comes through nonviolent struggle. CANVAS says it brings a strategic model and skill-set to the process, as well as knowledge of recent global protest history.

=== Otpor! ===
Established in Belgrade in October 1998, Otpor! emerged as a response to the introduction that year of repressive laws relating to the universities and mass media. Following the war in Kosovo and NATO air-strikes in 1999, Otpor! began its political campaign against Milosevic throughout the country. Espousing the principle of nonviolence, it used an array of tactics, from slogans and chants to rock concerts and Monty Python street humour, to galvanise the Serbian population against Milosevic. Otpor! adopted as its symbol of resistance a clenched fist, black on white or white on black – a subversion of the communist imagery of a red fist which was favored by Milosevic. Duda Petrovic, who designed the symbol explained, "I never knew it would be so important […] I drew it not out of ideals, but because I was in love with the Otpor girl who asked me to do it."

Authors credited Otpor's methods for stripping away the fear, fatalism and passivity that keep a dictator's subjects under oppression as well as turning passivity into action by making it easy – even cool – to become a revolutionary. The movement branded itself with hip slogans and graphics and rock music. It was influenced by nonviolent struggle leaders like Mohandas Gandhi, Nelson Mandela and Martin Luther King, but also by pop-culture and humor such as the famous UK comedy series, "Monty Python`s Flying Circus". Otpor's unified message and diverse membership proved much more attractive to young activists than the deeply divided opposition parties of the time. Instead of long speeches, Otpor relied on humor and street theater that mocked the regime.

Over a period of two years, Otpor! grew from a dozen or so students into a grassroots movement of over 70,000 people. Otpor! became one of the defining symbols of the anti-Milošević struggle and his subsequent overthrow. By aiming their activities at the pool of youth abstainers and other disillusioned voters, Otpor contributed to one of the biggest turnouts ever for the 24 September 2000 federal presidential elections with a turnout of more than 4,77 million voters, 72% of the total electorate. Its campaign called "He Is Finished!" against Milosevic was seen by many as a key factor in his electoral defeat in September 2000 and subsequent overthrow.

=== Post-Milosevic ===
Following Otpor!'s success in Serbia, civic activists in other countries contacted Otpor! leaders with a view to emulating their success. One of Otpor!'s leaders, Djinovic, traveled to Belarus on a number of occasions to meet with a student movement. However, the student movement was reportedly infiltrated soon after and it collapsed.

Otpor!'s counterparts in Georgia, Ukraine and Lebanon were more successful. In Georgia, Otpor! leaders had begun working with a student movement called Kmara ("Enough!") in 2002. Kmara went on to play a prominent role in securing the resignation of President Eduard Shevardnadze in November 2003 during the Rose Revolution. In Ukraine, Otpor! worked with the PORA ("It’s time") youth movement - a key player in Ukraine's Orange Revolution, which took place between November 2004 and January 2005.

The decision to set up a training centre was taken in 2003, while Djinovic and Popović were in South Africa working with Zimbabwean activists. Popović was a member of parliament at the time, a position he gave up in 2004 to concentrate on revolutionary activism. Djinovic had set up Serbia's first wireless internet provider in 2000. He currently funds approximately half of CANVAS' work.

== Organisational structure ==
Headquartered in Belgrade, CANVAS is run by Slobodan Djinovic and Srdja Popović. It has five full-time and one half-time employees who are paid as contractors and operate a network of international trainers with experience in successful democratic movements. They also hosts interns each academic semester and over summers.

== Teachings ==
CANVAS emphasises the importance of "unity, nonviolent discipline and planning" as the keys to success in nonviolent resistance.

CANVAS teachings can be summarised in a few simple principles: Power in society is not fixed, and can shift very swiftly from one social group to another. It can become fragile and can be redistributed, especially in non-democratic regimes. Ultimately, power in society comes from the obedience of the people. And those people – each of whom is individually a small source of power – can change their minds, and refuse to follow commands. In addition to that essential principles for the success of the movement are unity, planning and non-violent discipline. There must be a shared vision of tomorrow and a grand strategy for how to attain it. No movement can succeed if it bites off more than it can chew; instead, successful movements win small victories and build on them. In an interview with Octavian Manea, Popović was quoted as to say, "The power of "nonviolent struggle" lies in the mobilization of a great number of people around a common vision of tomorrow, building common strategy, followed by efficient nonviolent tactics and of course maintaining an offense and nonviolent discipline against your opponent."

Preparation is seen by CANVAS as paramount. Former CANVAS trainer Ivan Marovic was quoted as saying in a February 2011 Foreign Policy article, "Revolutions are often seen as spontaneous... It looks as if people just went into the street. But it’s the result of months or years of preparation. It is very boring until you reach a certain point, where you can organise mass demonstrations or strikes. If it is carefully planned, by the time they start, everything is over in a matter of weeks."

As part of the planning process, CANVAS teaches activists to identify "pillars of support" – institutions or organisations such as the police, the army, organised religion and the educational establishment – to be won over. "It is crucial for nonviolent movements to pull people out of the pillars of support like the police or military, rather than push people inside these pillars and appear threatening or aggressive to them," Popović was quoted as saying in an article published in Sojourners Magazine in May 2011. To disarm the police in Serbia, Otpor! deployed such tactics as delivering cookies and flowers to police stations.

CANVAS also views the creation of a strong brand with the potential to attract widespread support as key to a movement's success. Slogans, songs and identity symbols – such as Otpor!'s clenched fist - all play an important role in this regard. Together with clear articulation of a movement's aims, CANVAS's teachings cover topics including nonviolent movements' group identity, clear communication strategies with its target audiences and the development of solidarity among its activists in case they are arrested, detained or fired from their work. An important part of the curriculum is focused on how movements facing oppression can overcome fear and its adverse effects on people's morale and build enthusiasm.

For CANVAS, special attention should be given to developing movements' nonviolent discipline as "a single act of violence can destroy the credibility of a nonviolent movement". Accordingly, it teaches its students in techniques to avoid violence and how to face violence, particularly from the police and security forces.

== Methods for knowledge transfer ==
CANVAS disseminates its knowledge through a variety of media, including workshops, books, DVDs and specialised courses. Its workshops have reportedly been attended by over 1,000 people from 37 countries.

In 2007, CANVAS published its book for students, "Canvas Core Curriculum: A Guide To Effective Nonviolent Struggle." It has also published a handbook manual for activists entitled "Non-Violent Struggle – 50 Crucial Points", which has been translated into Spanish, French, Serbian, Arabic and Persian. The publication has been downloaded some 20,000 times in the Middle East, mostly by Iranians. CANVAS has also released an education film, "Bringing Down a Dictator." CANVAS curriculum is easily adaptable and is designed to be taken anywhere.

In January 2008, CANVAS started a joint graduate program at University of Belgrade's Faculty of Political Science named Strategies and Methods of Nonviolent Social Change. The certified course is based on CANVAS' core curriculum. CANVAS members regularly teach and present an academic version of their Core Curriculum and hold workshops on strategy and organization of nonviolent struggle at variety of educational institutions worldwide, including: John F. Kennedy School of Government, Harvard University; SAIS Center for Transatlantic Relations, Johns Hopkins University; School of International and Public Affairs, Columbia University (SIPA); and Georgetown University.

For the 2011–12 school year, CANVAS Executive Director Srdja Popović was a visiting scholar at Harriman Institute, within the SIPA.

== Successes ==
CANVAS has attracted publicity for its work with dissident groups in various countries. The clenched fist symbol was flying high on white flags in 2003 in Georgia, when nonviolent protesters stormed the country's parliament after the election fraud in an action that led to the toppling of former autocratic President Eduard Shevardnadze. Recently, more substantial media attention was given to their successful work with groups from the Maldives and, more recently and most notably, in Egypt.

In the Maldives, CANVAS gave training to the local opposition group and helped them end Maumoon Abdul Gayoom's 30-year presidential rule in 2008.

In Egypt, it emerged that Mohammed Adel, one of the leaders of the April 6 Youth Movement, which became one of the most important organisers of the uprising in Egypt that led to the resignation of President Hosni Mubarak in February 2011, had received training from CANVAS. Adel traveled to Belgrade to attend a 5-day CANVAS course in the strategies of nonviolent revolution in the summer of 2009. As he informed Al Jazeera English in an interview on 9 February 2011, he "got trained in how to conduct peaceful demonstrations, how to avoid violence, and how to face violence from the security forces, and then how to train others in how to demonstrate peacefully and how to organise and get people on the streets."

Aside from the successes of its on the field workshops, CANVAS has contributed to the field of study of strategic nonviolent resistance, and continues to regularly comment on current political social movements. CANVAS coined the term Laughtivism that is used to describe the use of humor in nonviolent struggle and that has been implemented by the New York-based group The Yes Men and also the term dilemma action which describes a tactic of nonviolent resistance of putting one's opponent in a lose-lose situation.

== Funding ==
CANVAS is a non-profit institution which relies solely on private funding; there is no charge for workshops and revolutionary know-how can be downloaded for free on the Internet. According to Frankfurter Allgemeine Zeitung, CANVAS is funded by primarily American organizations. CANVAS' biggest individual funder is its founding member and media mogul, Slobodan Djinovic. Djinovic privately funds about half of CANVAS' operating costs. CANVAS does not accept funding from individual governments.

== Controversy ==
The governments of Belarus and Iran, as well as former Venezuelan leader Hugo Chavez, have accused CANVAS of being a "revolution-exporter". CANVAS denies this, emphasizing its role as educator and empowerer of peaceful methods. CANVAS leaders often stress that "in order to be successful, nonviolent movements must avoid taking any advice from foreigners, must be home-grown" and that "nonviolent revolutions cannot be exported-or imported".

In 2011, the hacker collective Anonymous broke into the computer network of corporate intelligence agency Stratfor, and the subsequently leaked e-mails were published by WikiLeaks. Included was correspondence between Srđa Popović and analysts at Stratfor, and Wikileaks tweeted that CANVAS was "used by Stratfor to spy on opposition groups."

In December 2013, Steve Horn and US Uncut co-founder Carl Gibson published an article that sought to shed light on Popović's interactions with Stratfor, and criticized him for his apparently extensive interaction with Stratfor analysts, which ranged from passing them intelligence to inviting them to his wedding. The article garnered heavy criticism from the New York-Based culture-jammer Andy Bichlbaum (who served with Popović on the board of Waging Nonviolence at the time). Gibson and Horn stood by their original critique, pointing out that Popović served as a liaison between Stratfor and Muneer Satter, a prominent investment banker who worked at the time for Goldman Sachs, and that CANVAS funding was arranged by US Ambassador Michael McFaul.

In February 2014, Wikileaks again drew attention to CANVAS' relationship with Stratfor, particularly with regards to Venezuela.

The use of Otpor!'s symbol of the clenched fist by many grassroots movements around the world has encouraged rumors that they are directly affiliated with CANVAS. The symbol, however, is not patented and CANVAS has, in fact, welcomed the reuse of the symbol by resistance movements in any nonviolent struggle, including those with whom the organization has had no direct contact. Notably, the symbol has been utilized by activists in such countries as Russia, Venezuela, Serbia, Kenya, and Egypt.

CANVAS has been listed as a terrorist organization by the United Arab Emirates.

== Awards ==
In November 2010, CANVAS was awarded the Danish PL (Paul Lauritzen) Foundation Peace Prize.

In November 2011. Foreign Policy Magazine credited Srdja Popović, Executive director of CANVAS as one of their "Top 100 Global Thinkers" for his role in spreading the idea and educating activists about nonviolent social change.

In February 2012, Srdja Popović was named to "The Smart List 2012" by Wired UK magazine as one of 50 people who will change the world.

In 2012, the director of the Peace Research Institute Oslo, Kristian Berg Harpviken, speculated that either CANVAS, or Srdja Popović himself, could be among the candidates for the 2012 Nobel Peace Prize (eventually awarded to the European Union). CANVAS appeared on the same PRIO shortlist of Nobel Piece Prize possible nominees in 2022.

In February 2016, CANVAS and Popović were presented with the Jean Mayer Award by Tufts University.

Popović and CANVAS work will earn them the Pennsylvania State University McCourtney Institute for Democracy’s 2020 Brown Democracy Medal.

== Publications ==
- Nonviolent Struggle: 50 Crucial Points (2006), available in English, Spanish, French, Arabic, Fars, and Serbian
- CANVAS Core Curriculum: A Guide to Effective Nonviolent Struggle (2007), available in English, Arabic, and Persian
- A Brief History of Otpor (2008), available in English
- Making Oppression Backfire (2013), available in Arabic
