= Anton Abele =

Swedish activist, debater and politician

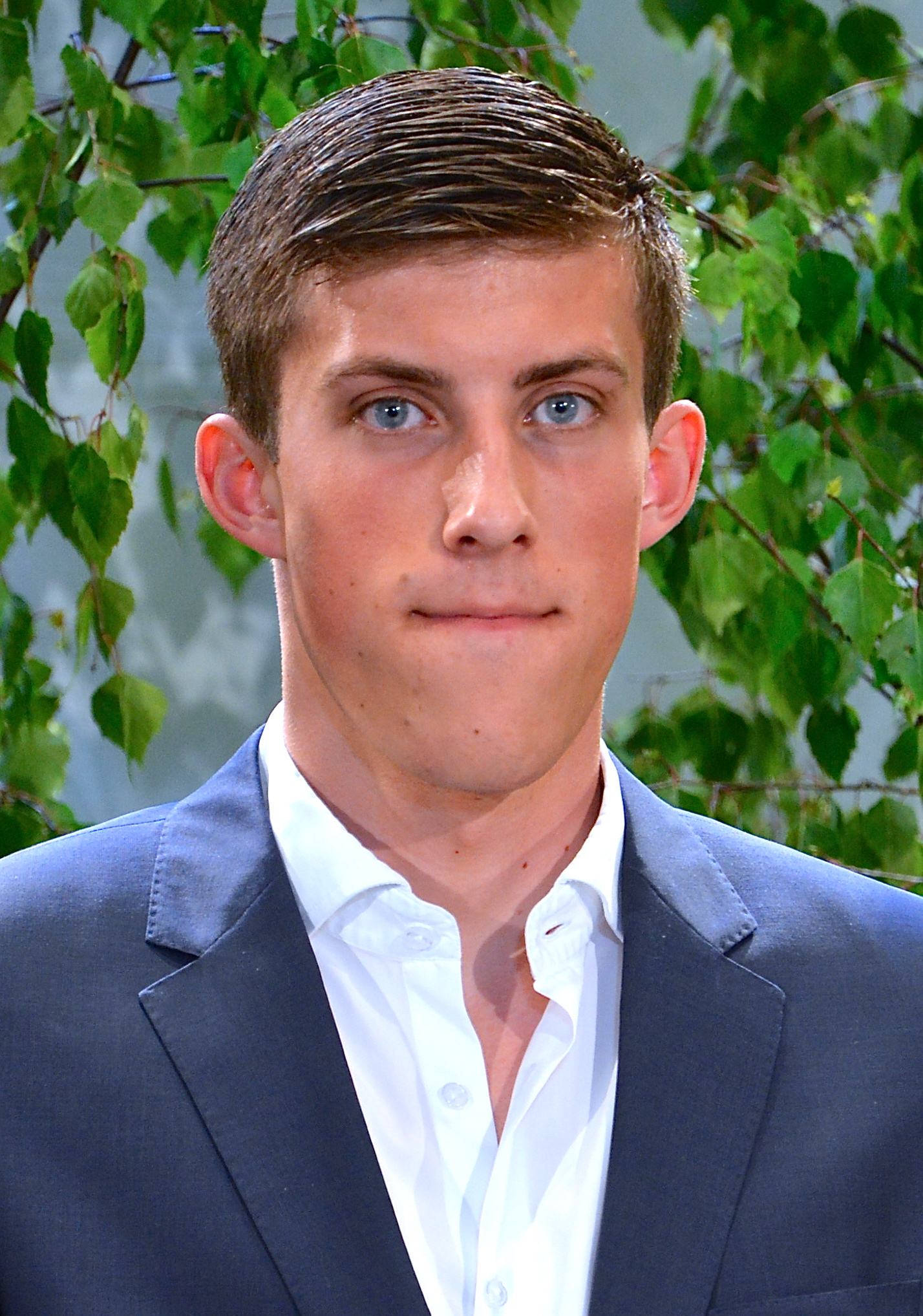
- Anton Abele (2013)

Member of the Swedish Parliament for Stockholm County
- In office 19 October 2010 – 29 September 2014

Personal details
- Born: 10 January 1992 (age 34) Stockholm, Sweden
- Party: Moderate Party

Anton Amadé Abele (born 10 January 1992) is a Swedish activist, debater and politician who was Member of Parliament for Stockholm County, replacing former Minister for Culture and Sports Lena Adelsohn Liljeroth, from the 2010 general election until the 2014 general election. At the age of 18, he is the youngest person ever to become a Member of Parliament in Sweden, as well as the youngest ever member of any national legislature in the world.

He entered the political scene as an anti-violence activist following the death of 16-year-old Riccardo Campogiani, who was beaten to death in October 2007.

On 25 July 2013, Abele announced that he will finish his term in the Swedish Parliament, then end his political career and not run for re-election in the 2014 general election, citing disillusionment with the working climate in the Parliament.

== Achievements ==
Abele received the human rights award "Free Your Mind" at the MTV Europe Music Awards 2007 in Munich in November 2007. In January 2008, two major Swedish newspapers independently awarded Abele their "2007 Stockholmer of the Year" prize. King Carl XVI Gustaf of Sweden acknowledged Abele's initiatives in his televised Christmas speech on 25 December 2007. In the same speech the King also said that "Nobody can do everything, but everybody can do something". In May 2008, Abele and his Swedish campaign "Stop Street Violence" received the "2008 Most Important Communication Effort" award.

Anton Abele has held a number of speeches and presentations. The Council of Europe invited Anton Abele to participate in the conference "Building a Europe For and With Children-Towards a Strategy for 2009–2011" in Stockholm, and to hold the speech "Children Changing Societies" on 8 September 2008. On 30 April 2008, Abele held the traditional Spring Speech at Skansen, Stockholm. The theme for the speech was "Change". At the demonstration against street violence in October 2007, Abele gave a speech to over 10,000 people, who had gathered in Stockholm to show their disgust against violence. Anton Abele is frequently invited to speak at various events. These events most often have the escalating violence and actions against it as the topic.

As a result of this initiative, triggered mainly by young people to young people, the topic of escalating violence and insecurity among young people has been lifted to governmental level.

== Non-profit organisation and activism ==
Abele created a Swedish Facebook group called "Bevara oss från gatuvåldet" (Save us from street violence). In one week, the group grew to having more than 100,000 members. In addition, on 12 October 2007, Anton Abele arranged the demonstration "Stop street violence" with more than 10,000 young people and adults participating in Stockholm. Simultaneously with the massive demonstration in Stockholm, anti-violence demonstrations were also held in other major cities in the Nordic region.

Abele founded a non-profit organisation called Stoppa Gatuvåldet (Stop Street Violence), which now operates several projects against violence. The main focus of the group, is to increase the understanding of the medical and legal consequences of violence mainly among young people. The group also works with ethical issues and works toward changing attitudes. The group, which is politically and religiously independent, has both young people and adults as members. On 10 February 2008, the group organised a conference "Stop Street Violence" bringing together over 1,000 young people and adults in the Stockholm City Hall.

== MP career ==
On 14 October 2010, Abele became the youngest ever Member of the Swedish Parliament when he was chosen from the top of the Moderate Party MP short list after Anna König Jerlmyr vacated her seat to be the deputy mayor of Stockholm. On 25 July 2013, Abele announced that he will finish his term and not run for re-election in the 2014 elections, citing disillusionment with the working climate at the Riksdag.

Abele was criticised in 2013 for the plagiarization of a speech made by Barack Obama, which he held regarding urban security in Paris in December 2012 at a conference.

== Position at Allra ==
Abele was head of public relations for the pensions company Allra until the Swedish Pensions Agency 2017 announced that the pension funds of Allra would be deregistered. This was after repeated complaints, and Allra was subsequently reported to the police by the Swedish Pensions Agency. Months before resigning Abele argued that the customers got a rate of return that was higher than that of a forecast. The Svea Court of Appeal later sentenced four men related to the pensions company Allra to prison terms ranging from four to six years for crimes described as serious.

Honorary titles
Preceded by Annie Lööf	Baby of the House; 2010–2014	Succeeded by Dennis Dioukarev
