= Dilemma action =

A dilemma action is a type of non-violent civil disobedience designed to create a "response dilemma" or "lose-lose" situation for public authorities "by forcing them to either concede some public space to protesters or make themselves look absurd or heavy-handed by acting against the protest." The Serbian-based NGO Centre for Applied Nonviolent Action and Strategies has extensively used the technique in its trainings to nonviolent civil resistors. Dilemma actions have been shown to increase non-violent campaign success rate by 11-16%

Examples of dilemma actions include Ai Weiwei's gathering to eat pig's trotters, the Standing protests of the 2013 protests in Turkey, the Gaza Freedom Flotilla and Uganda's 2011 Walk to Work protests.

== Factors of success ==
McClennen et al (2023) identified four main factors that contribute to the success of a Dilemma Action:

- Facilitating group formation,
- Delegitimising opponents,
- Reducing fear,
- Generating sympathetic media coverage.

== See also ==
- Dilemma (confrontation analysis)
