= Branka Prpa =

Serbian historian and author (born 1953)

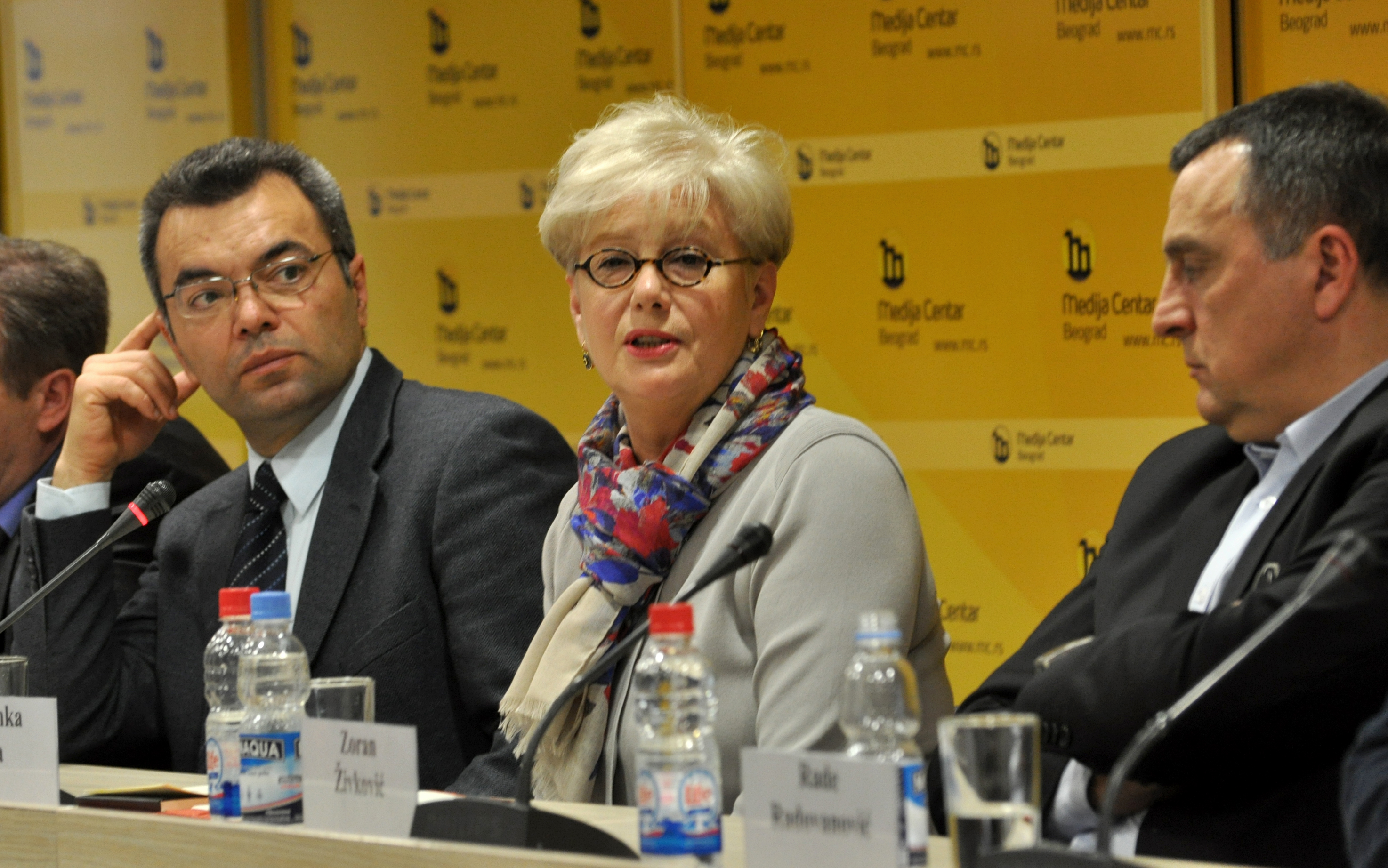
Branka Prpa

Branka Prpa (born 1953, Split, PR Croatia, FPR Yugoslavia) is a historian, author, and former director of Belgrade's Historical Archives (Istorijski arhiv Beograda).

== Biography ==
In 1972, against the wishes of her family, she left Split for Belgrade to study history at the University of Belgrade Faculty of Philosophy. Soon, she got married, had a son, and remained living in the capital even after she graduated. In 1988, her book about Serb publishing in Dalmatia entitled Srpsko-dalmatinski magazin was published. Prpa, an ethnic Croat, is better known to the public as the girlfriend of the slain Belgrade journalist and newspaper owner Slavko Ćuruvija with whom she lived in an unmarried union. Prpa was with her common-law spouse on the day of his murder in April 1999. They were walking hand in hand, about to enter the front door of their apartment building when they were approached from behind by unknown men who murdered Ćuruvija and pistol-whipped Branka Prpa, briefly knocking her unconscious.

Slobodan Antonić criticised her scientific conclusions about the role of the Serbian quisling forces in The Holocaust in German-occupied Serbia and considered her work on the subject to be meet the criteria of historical revisionism.
