= Aleksandar Tijanić =

Serbian journalist

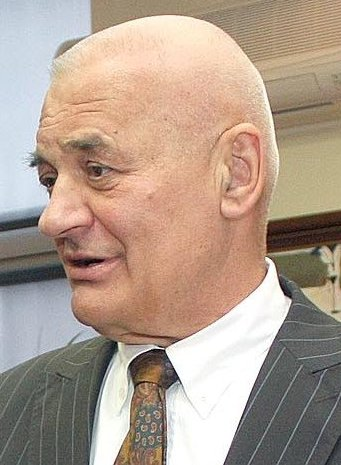
- Tijanić in 2012

Minister of Information of Serbia
- In office 28 May 1996 – 17 December 1996
- Succeeded by: Radmila Milentijević

Advisor to the President of FR Yugoslavia
- In office 2001–2004

General Director of the Radio Television of Serbia
- In office 18 March 2004 – 28 October 2013
- Preceded by: Aleksandar Crkvenjakov
- Succeeded by: Nikola Mirkov

Personal details
- Born: 13 December 1949 Đakovica, PR Serbia, FPR Yugoslavia
- Died: 28 October 2013 (aged 63) Belgrade, Serbia
- Education: University of Belgrade (no degree)
- Occupation: Journalist, columnist

Aleksandar Tijanić (Serbian Cyrillic: Александар Тијанић; 13 December 1949 – 28 October 2013) was a Serbian journalist and director-general of the country's public broadcaster Radio-Television of Serbia from 2004 to 2013. During his career he was a star columnist for leading newspapers and magazines published in SFR Yugoslavia and Serbia, editor in chief of several prominent television stations, political advisor to prominent Serbian politicians, and Minister of Information for four months in 1996 in the government headed by Mirko Marjanović during the rule of Slobodan Milošević.

== Early life ==
Tijanić was born in Đakovica, FPR Yugoslavia. After finishing high school in his home town, he moved to Belgrade to study journalism at University of Belgrade's Faculty of Political Sciences. He did not complete his studies.

== Journalism career ==
After working his way up during the late 1970s and early 1980s in Politika publications such as Auto Svet, he got a sought-after job at NIN magazine, where he first wrote for the supplement on vehicles and eventually advanced to a position on the editorial board. His job in NIN was a springboard for other top editorial positions. In the mid-1980s he was editor-in-chief of Intervju. In parallel, he wrote for periodical publications in Croatia, Slovenia, and Bosnia and Herzegovina.

Following the 8th session of the Central Committee of the League of Communists of Serbia in September 1987, which was essentially the official date of Slobodan Milošević's ascent to power in Serbia, Tijanić lost all of his writing engagements in the Belgrade publications and was thus reduced to mostly writing in Croatian papers.

He became particularly well known as a political columnist writing for the Split-based weekly newspaper Nedjeljna Dalmacija, which soon earned him the moniker of "the giant of Croatian journalism". In his column titled En Passant he often expressed views critical of the Yugoslav government and Communism in general. His column effectively ended in 1990, following the shift in the newspaper's editorial policy as his column was deemed too critical of the new Croatian vice-president Antun Vrdoljak, although Tijanić was allowed to write one last entry in late March 1991. Simultaneous to his Nedjeljna Dalmacija engagement, Tijanić also wrote for the Croatian newsmagazines Danas and Start.

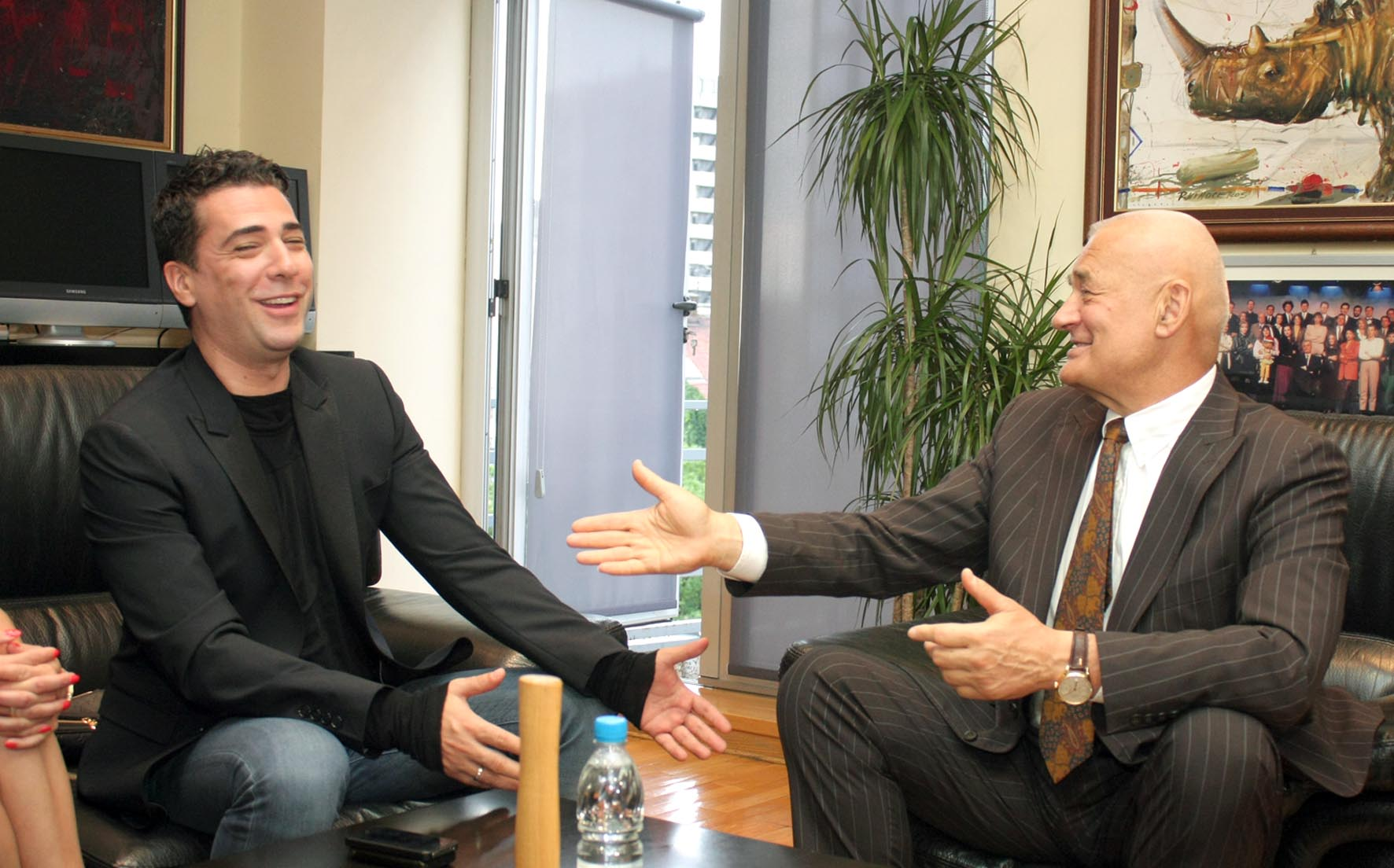
Tijanić, the RTS general-director, meeting with pop star Željko Joksimović in 2012.

In the meantime, during the first part of 1991, he co-hosted the popular The Art of Living Together talk-show along alongside Mirjana Bobić-Mojsilović and Dragan Babić. Conceptualized as a free format taped in front of live theater audience at Sarajevo's Teatar Obala, the programme quickly gained country-wide recognition and notability. Tijanić conducted memorable interviews with, among others, Milovan Đilas, notable communist dissident, and Stjepan Mesić, at the time high-ranking official of Franjo Tuđman's Croatian Democratic Union (HDZ) and soon to become last president of SFR Yugoslavia's presidency. The show abruptly ended in May 1991.

Coming back to Belgrade, Tijanić began an editing stint at Sportski žurnal sports daily in June 1991.

In 1993, Tijanić became the head of programming at the recently launched TV Politika. In June 1996, he was selected as Minister of Information in the government headed by Mirko Marjanović but resigned after five months.

In February 1997, he founded the daily newspaper Građanin, which lasted a few months. In October 1997, he resumed his journalistic career in Dnevni Telegraf and the weekly Evropljanin (1998-1999). Afterwards, he became a columnist for the Bosnian daily "Nezavisne novine".

In March 2004, he was appointed director of Radio Television of Serbia (RTS) during the time of Prime Minister Vojislav Koštunica. Tijanić served as an advisor to Koštunica from 2001 to 2004 when he was President.

== Controversy ==
Milorad Ulemek was arrested on 1 May 2004 for the assassination of Prime Minister of Serbia Zoran Đinđić. Before Ulemek was transferred to a state prison, he had an unofficial meeting with several political opponents of Zoran Đinđić, including Aleksandar Tijanić.

In March 2005, an entire 200 plus page pamphlet-type book named Slučaj službenika Tijanića solely devoted to denouncing Tijanić as a person and a professional was published in Belgrade by non-governmental organization Lawyers' Committee for Human Rights (YUCOM). The book's cover features a political cartoon-type drawing by Predrag Koraksić Corax, showing Tijanic as a chameleon wearing various political party logos and flags of various countries. The book's author is never mentioned explicitly although it thanks Vladimir Beba Popović, former Serbian government official, for "providing the material so that this publication remains a factual portrayal of an individual's career instead of revenge".

Tijanić sued the publishers of Slučaj službenika Tijanića book for the amount of RSD8.5 million (~€100,000). Following a prolonged, incident-filled process and several appeals, in September 2009, Supreme Court of Serbia ruled in Tijanić's favour ordering YUCOM to pay him RSD200,000 (~€2,200) as well as to cease distribution of the book and to issue a public proclamation about the verdict on the pages of Politika daily.

== Personal life ==
He was married and had son Stefan and daughter Zara.

== Death ==
Tijanić died on 28 October 2013 from an apparent heart attack.
