= Ljiljana Smajlović =

Serbian journalist (born 1956)

Ljiljana Smajlović Љиљана Смајловић
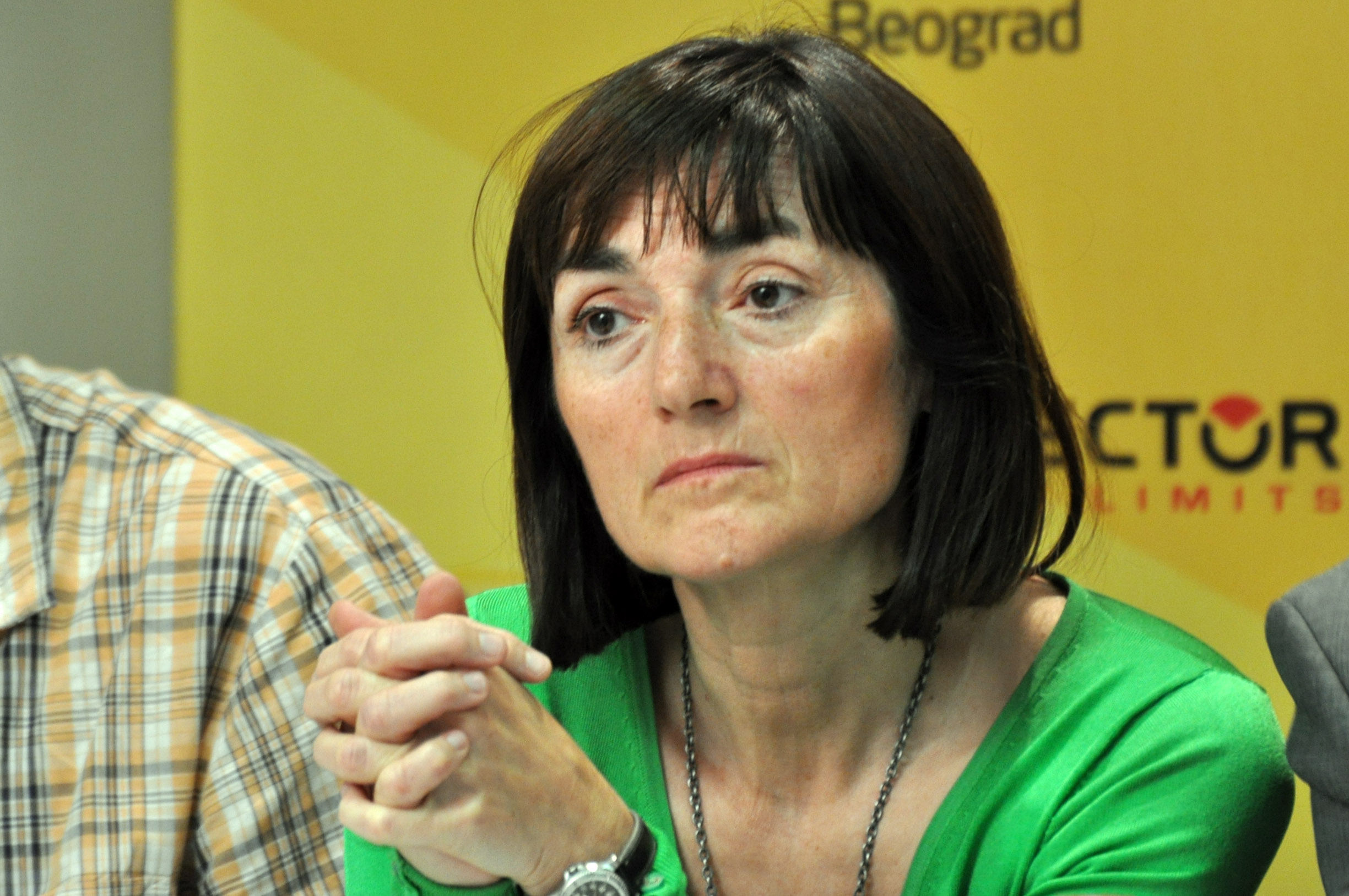
- Smajlović in 2011
- Born: Ljiljana Ugrica; 22 January 1956 (age 70); Sarajevo, Yugoslavia
- Occupation: Journalist

Ljiljana Smajlović (Serbo-Croatian Cyrillic: Љиљана Смајловић; née Ugrica, Serbo-Croatian Cyrillic: Угрица; born 22 January 1956) is a Serbian journalist and the former editor of Politika, the oldest daily newspaper in the Balkans. From 2009 to 2017, she was the president of the Serbian Journalists' Association (UNS).

== Early life and education ==
She was born into a middle-class family of Bosnian Serbs. Her mother Danica, a native of Bihać, was involved in the People's Liberation Struggle on the Partisan side during World War II before remaining in the sanitary service after the war, reaching the rank of lieutenant colonel in the Yugoslav People's Army (JNA); her father Mirko, from Serbia, was a member of the JNA's civil service.

She said that "as a small girl, I found discussing the Cuban Missile Crisis and the relations between great powers much more interesting than playing with dolls".

At the age of nine, with her mother and sister, she went to Algeria to attend a French boarding school. Upon returning home to Sarajevo, she began her secondary education at the First Sarajevo Gymnasium. In 1972, for the final year of secondary school, she received a scholarship from the American Field Service and moved to San Rafael, California, where she lived with an American host family for about a year. In 2013, looking back on her first experience in the United States, as a 16-year-old in the early 1970s, she said:

"Being so politicized as a child, I arrived there with a feeling of moral superiority over America and its people. After some time there, I very much grew to like the family that hosted me -- they were very liberal and progressive -- but despite all that, I remember still holding them in contempt to a certain extent, and thinking: 'Gee, what nice people, it really is such a shame they're such collaborators in all those horrific war crimes in Vietnam'. So, despite being fond of them personally, on another level, I still thought of them as instruments of the American imperialist policy. I mean, 16 years of age is probably too old to have those kinds of misconceptions, but I had them. So now, I often find myself thinking that it's almost poetic justice that, during the 1990s when I would go to America, I got to experience being seen as being nothing more than part of the people that committed horrible war crimes during the Yugoslav Wars."

After graduating secondary school, Ugrica began journalism studies at the University of Sarajevo's Faculty of Political Science. She received a scholarship for additional studies in Cleveland, Ohio.

== Journalism career ==
Smajlović's first job was at Sarajevo's Oslobođenje daily in 1978 where she gradually advanced to the post of political section editor and later correspondent from Brussels. In 1992, after Bosnian War broke out, she moved to Belgrade where she got a job at Vreme weekly magazine. In 1994, she received a fellowship from the Woodrow Wilson International Center for Scholars and moved to United States for a year, continuing to write for Vreme as a foreign correspondent.

She specialized in international relations topics, developing an esteemed reputation, which led to Slavko Ćuruvija offering her a job as foreign editor at his upstart bi-weekly magazine Evropljanin in 1998. Following the killing of Slavko Ćuruvija, Evropljanin ceased publication forcing Smajlović and other journalist to look for work. She got a job at NIN initially as the Hague Tribunal commentator and later as weekly columnist. In October 2005 Smajlović got named the editor-in-chief of Politika daily, replacing Milan Mišić. She became the first woman in the newspaper's century-long history to hold that job. On 21 January 2006, she wrote an opinion piece for the Los Angeles Times criticizing both the NATO and the Serbian government for failing to arrest Radovan Karadžić and Ratko Mladić, respectively.

Since September 2007, Smajlović is a panelist on the weekly current-events discussion programme called U mnoštvu dokaza on TV Avala. Her October 2008 firing from the post of Politika's editor-in-chief caused a controversy and allegations of political meddling from the Serbian ruling party DS. During spring 2009, Smajlović became the president of Serbian Association of Journalists (Udruženje novinara Srbije). In February 2013, information appeared in the Serbian media that she will be returning to Politika in editor-in-chief capacity.

As of 2022, she has contributed to Serbian branch of RT, a Russian state-owned propaganda network.

== Other endeavours ==
From 1996 until 2005 Smajlović consulted for International Research & Exchanges Board (IREX) Serbia media project. This American NGO focuses on independent media, initiatives for women, support for US scholars, and local alumni programming.

In the wake of her firing from Politika, on 12 November 2008, it was announced that Smajlović is being considered as a candidate for the position of Serbia's ambassador to Canada. A week later on 20 November 2008, further information appeared in Serbian media that it was agreed upon that she would be the Serbia's next ambassador in Canada. However, she never took office as Serbia had recalled its previous ambassador over Canada's recognition of Kosovo and the next ambassador to take office, in 2010, was Zoran Veljić.

Since 2015 she is member of European Centre for Press and Media Freedom.

== Personal ==
She was married to Zlatan Smajlović before divorcing in 1988. They have a son together.
