= Otpor =

Former Serbian civic movement and liberal political party

Resistance! Отпор!
- Logo of Otpor
- Leader: Collective leadership
- Founded: 10 October 1998
- Dissolved: September 2004
- Merged into: Democratic Party
- Headquarters: Belgrade
- Ideology: Democracy; Anti-authoritarianism; Anti-corruption; Anti-Milošević
- National affiliation: Democratic Opposition of Serbia
- National Assembly (2003): 0 / 250

Otpor (Serbian Cyrillic: Отпор!, English: Resistance!, stylized as Otpor!) was a political organization in Serbia (then part of FR Yugoslavia) from 1998 until 2004.

In its initial period from 1998 to 2000, Otpor began as a civic protest group, eventually turning into a movement, which adopted the Narodni pokret (the People's Movement) title, against the policies of the Serbian authorities under the influence of Yugoslav president Slobodan Milošević. Following Milošević's overthrow in October 2000, Otpor became a political watchdog organization monitoring the activities of the post-Milošević period of the DOS coalition. Finally, during fall 2003, Otpor briefly became a political party which, due to its failure to pass the 5% threshold needed to get any seats in the Serbian parliament, soon merged into the Democratic Party (DS).

Founded and best known as an organization employing nonviolent struggle as a course of action against the Milošević-controlled Serbian authorities, Otpor grew into a civic youth movement whose activity culminated on 5 October 2000 with Milošević's overthrow. In the course of a two-year nonviolent struggle against Milošević, Otpor spread across Serbia, attracting in its heyday more than 70,000 supporters who were credited for their role in the 5 October overthrow.

After the overthrow, Otpor launched campaigns to hold the new government accountable, pressing for democratic reforms and fighting corruption, as well as insisting on cooperation with the International Criminal Tribunal (ICTY) at the Hague.

== Initial activity ==
An Otpor membership signup recruitment slip from the movement's early days.

Otpor was formed in Belgrade on 10 October 1998 in response to a controversial piece of legislation in Serbia – the university law – introduced earlier that year by the Serbian government under Prime Minister Mirko Marjanović. Also, days before Otpor got announced, the government introduced a decree (uredba) outlining special measures in the wake of the ongoing NATO bombing threat. Citing the decree, on 14 October 1998, the government's Ministry of Information headed by Aleksandar Vučić banned the publishing of Dnevni telegraf, Danas, and Naša borba, three Belgrade dailies which were critical of the government to varying degrees.

The newly formed group named Otpor mostly consisted of the Demokratska omladina (Democratic Party's youth wing) members, activists of the various NGOs that operated in Serbia, and students from the two public universities in Belgrade – University of Belgrade and University of Arts. It quickly grew from a small group into a network of similarly politically minded young people, many of whom were already veterans of anti-Milošević demonstrations such as the 1996-97 protests and the 9 March 1991 protest. With the political opposition in Serbia in disarray, Otpor decided to build a broad political movement rather than a traditional NGO or political party. Frustrated with opposition leaders protecting their narrow personal and party interests, which often degenerated into infighting, the group also decided that "it would have no leaders".

Early on, Otpor defined its objectives and methods, including an account of what it saw as the main problems of the country, in the "Declaration of the Future of Serbia." The declaration was signed and supported by all prominent student organizations in Serbia. An advisory body was set up and its members became the main promoters of the declaration.

Initially, Otpor's activities were limited to the University of Belgrade. In an effort to gather new nonpartisan energy, not to mention making it harder for state media to discredit and smear them as just another opposition political group, Otpor avoided publicizing its ties to the Democratic Party (DS) even though the two organizations held similar political goals and shared many of the same members. Early on they agreed the organization's symbol to be the clenched fist. Young designer Nenad "Duda" Petrović created the logo.

=== Four students get arrested for stenciling Otpor logo ===
The authorities' immediate reaction to the appearance of Otpor was extremely heavy-handed, even before the movement held any public gatherings. In the early morning hours of Wednesday, 4 November 1998, four students – 22-year-old Teodora Tabački (enrolled at the University of Belgrade's Faculty of Philosophy), Marina Glišić (22, Faculty of Philosophy), Dragana Milinković (22, Faculty of Philology), and Nikola Vasiljević (19, University of Arts' FDU) – were arrested for stencil spraying the clenched fist symbol on the UofB's Faculty of Mathematics building facade. Later that same day, after reportedly being intimidated into signing a pre-typed, joint statement of guilt, the four students were taken before a misdemeanor judge who handed them a sentence of 10 days in prison. In his explanation of the sentence, judge Željko Muniža cited that "with their brazen and reckless behaviour, the four students have endangered the citizens' calm and disturbed the public order." On 5 November, the students' legal representatives – Nikola Barović, Branko Pavlović, and Dušan Stojković – appealed the respective sentences citing "improper use of both the misdemeanor process and the misdemeanor law as well as the scandalous subsequent sanction." One day later, the misdemeanor council rejected the appeal as baseless.

The case generated some public reaction with the University of Belgrade's Faculty of Electrical Engineering professor and Otpor member Srbijanka Turajlić calling the sentences "inappropriate" and further scolding the University of Belgrade rector Jagoš Purić as well as University of Arts rector Radmila Bakočević for "not publicly reacting to their own students being rounded-up on the street and hauled off to jail".

=== Dnevni telegraf gets fined for publishing an Otpor ad ===
The organization gained further prominence when the Dnevni telegraf (daily tabloid owned and edited by Slavko Ćuruvija) 7 November issue appeared on newsstands with Otpor's ad featuring the clenched fist symbol on the front page. The paper had previously been banned for "spreading defeatism by running subversive headlines", a punishment meted out under the controversial new government decree. And though the ban was lifted within a week as the decree was put out of effect only to be replaced by the new information law, Dnevni telegraf's publishing hiatus continued past the ban being lifted and the 7 November issue was its return to the newsstands. Seeing the Otpor ad on the front page, the authorities quickly reacted again, taking Ćuruvija and his collaborators to court within days via a trumped up private citizen's complaint and handing them another draconian fine under the information law, this time prompting the newspaper's relocation to Podgorica.

=== Veran Matić wears Otpor t-shirt during MTV Europe Awards live broadcast ===
Several days later, on Thursday, 12 November, another instance of Otpor's public exposure occurred – this time at the 1998 MTV Europe Music Awards ceremony in Assago near Milan where Radio B92 was the recipient of the Free Your Mind award. Accepting the award presented by Michael Stipe, Peter Buck, and Mike Mills of R.E.M. during live broadcast, B92 head Veran Matić came out on stage in an Otpor T-shirt with inscription "Живи Отпор!" (Live the Resistance) above the clenched fist logo. In his acceptance speech, delivered in Serbian, Matić explicitly mentioned the four students that were arrested and sentenced the previous week.

The awards ceremony was carried live in Serbia on TV Košava, a station owned at the time by Milošević's daughter Marija. However, when it came time for the Free Your Mind award to be handed out in the live broadcast, only the initial intro by R.E.M. and part of the accompanying pre-taped video piece about Radio B92 was shown before abruptly cutting to an extended block of commercials.

Otpor's first significant gathering took place on Saturday, 14 November at the University of Belgrade Faculty of Electrical Engineering – over a thousand students marched across town to the Faculty of Philology where a number of students were under lockdown inside the building as the authorities wanted to prevent them from joining the protest. Otpor leader Srđa Popović (also a member of the Democratic Party) was arrested that day and then released on intervention from Amnesty International after being detained for 8 hours. By late November, Otpor ideas reached Novi Sad, Serbia's second city, with the first graffiti appearing on buildings in the city.

During the NATO air-strikes against FR Yugoslavia in 1999 regarding the Kosovo War, Otpor ceased its activities. In the aftermath of NATO bombing, the organization began a political campaign aimed directly against the Yugoslav president Slobodan Milošević. This resulted in nationwide police repression against Otpor activists, during which nearly 2,000 were arrested, some beaten.

=== Organization grows into a movement ===
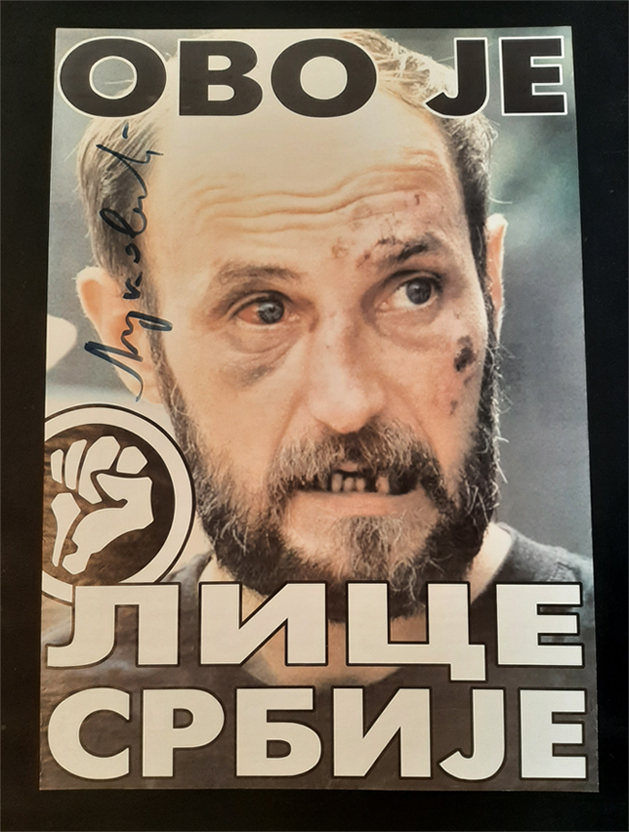
Požarevac-based Otpor member Radojko Luković became a cause célèbre after his severe beating and disappearance in 2000

Otpor next managed to bring opposition parties together and mobilize the population of Serbia against Milošević. It stressed the importance of mobilizing the population to vote, but also promoted "individual resistance" (i.e. nonviolent methods of civic disobedience in order to counter possible electoral fraud). This strategy was slowly embraced by the opposition parties in the months to come.

The strategy was based on two assumptions:

- That the opposition had to be united around one presidential candidate in order to get more votes than Milošević; and
- That Milošević would never accept defeat in the elections (and he would falsify ballots and even use force to defend his power).

By fall 1999 and early 2000, the Serbian opposition political parties, most notably the Democratic Party and the Serbian Renewal Movement (SPO), realized the potency of Otpor's methods and the resonance of its message with the youth. Thus began the battle for control of Otpor between DS and SPO. Since both parties already had a significant number of their youth wing members within Otpor, this trend continued on a large scale with both DS and SPO (and other opposition parties as well) instructing their local chapters throughout Serbia to recruit party youth members en masse into Otpor. As a result, Otpor's membership swelled into tens of thousands.

Otpor's unified message and diverse membership proved much more attractive to young activists than the deeply divided opposition parties of the time. Although they had found common ground in Otpor, the separate opposition parties were still reluctant to cooperate among themselves. Otpor's major challenge was to bring these divided groups together in preparation for the 2000 election campaign. Instead of using old methods of "bringing everyone to the table and then…trying to come up with a common strategy and goal", the original core group of Otpor founders had gathered to first find a single goal that everyone could agree upon: removing Milošević.

During the presidential campaign of September 2000, Otpor launched its "Gotov je" (He's Finished!) and the "Vreme Je!" (It's Time!) campaigns, which galvanized national discontent with Milošević and eventually resulted in his defeat. Some students who led Otpor used Serbian translations of Gene Sharp's writings on nonviolent action as a theoretical basis for their campaigns.

Otpor became one of the defining symbols of the anti-Milošević struggle and his subsequent overthrow. By aiming their activities at the pool of youth abstainers and other disillusioned voters, Otpor contributed to one of the biggest turnouts ever for the 24 September 2000 federal presidential elections with more than 4,77 million votes (72% of the total electorate).

Persuading a large number of the traditional electorate to abandon Milošević was another one of the areas where Otpor played a key role. Milošević had in the past succeeded in persuading the public that his political opponents were traitors working for foreign interests, but in the case of Otpor, the tactic largely backfired, as the beatings and imprisonments of their members during the summer of 2000 only further cemented the decision to vote against the government in many voters' minds.

== Post-Milošević ==
In the months immediately following the 5 October Overthrow, Otpor members emerged as widely celebrated figures across the Federal Republic of Yugoslavia, receiving considerable recognition from both the domestic public and Western governments. Their popularity was reflected in the widespread display of Otpor T-shirts by celebrities, public figures, and other prominent personalities seeking to associate themselves with the movement. The movement's influence even extended into the sporting world, with Partizan Basketball Club displaying the iconic Otpor clenched-fist logo at the centre of the court during a FIBA Suproleague match. The symbol became a prominent feature of public life, reflecting the movement's newfound popularity. This growing public admiration also encouraged individuals associated with the former government to align themselves with the new DOS-led authorities by publicly endorsing Otpor and its activities.

The pop-culture component of Otpor's activities became especially pronounced in this period. On 16 November, little over a month after the overthrow, Otpor received the Free Your Mind award at the 2000 MTV Europe Music Awards. Activists Milja Jovanović and Branko Ilić were on hand in Stockholm to accept the award presented to them by French actor Jean Reno. Back home a couple of days later, FR Yugoslavia's foreign minister Goran Svilanović held a reception for Otpor's delegation consisting of Milja Jovanović, Ivan Andrić, and Nenad Konstantinović in order to congratulate them on the MTV award. Then, in early December, Serbian singer-songwriter Đorđe Balašević held a concert in Belgrade's National Theater specifically for and in praise of Otpor members, which was televised nationally on RTS 2. The movement even turned to concert promotion itself, organizing several Laibach gigs in Belgrade.

In the midst of all the praise and adulation, the movement promised to keep on. Otpor initially attempted to establish itself in a "watch dog" role after the revolution by launching campaigns holding the new government accountable, pressing for democratic reforms, and fighting corruption. It started weeks after the revolution with "Samo vas gledamo" (We're Watching You) campaign, sending the message of accountability to new authorities. In parallel, by November 2000, with the upcoming December 2000 parliamentary elections, launched two campaigns named "Overi" (Verify It) and "Upotrebi ga" (Use It). Though some already questioned the movement's raison d'être, the idea behind both was to encourage the electorate to "verify" the 5 October revolution by voting against the parties that were part of the government – the Socialist Party of Serbia (SPS) and the Serbian Radical Party (SRS) – at the upcoming constituent republic-level parliamentary election.

In 2001, the corruption monitoring becoming the new focus with several new anti-corruption campaigns started (Bez anestezije, etc.), but it was clear that Otpor experienced problems staying relevant on the transformed political scene of Serbia and FR Yugoslavia.

=== Revelation of U.S. involvement ===
By late November 2000, information started appearing about substantial outside assistance Otpor received leading up to the revolution. Otpor was a recipient of substantial funds from U.S. government-affiliated organizations such as the National Endowment for Democracy (NED), International Republican Institute (IRI), and US Agency for International Development (USAID).

Contacting various officials from the U.S. based organizations, in his New York Times Magazine piece, journalist Roger Cohen sought to shed some light on the extent of American logistical and financial assistance received by Otpor. Paul B. McCarthy from the Washington-based NED stated that Otpor received the majority of US$3 million spent by NED in Serbia from September 1998 until October 2000. At the same time, McCarthy himself held a series of meetings with Otpor's leaders in Podgorica, as well as Szeged and Budapest.

Just how much of the US resources appropriated in the year 2000 by USAID, for democracy and governance, which included support to groups that worked to bring an end to the Milošević era through peaceful, democratic means, went to Otpor is not clear. However, what is clear is that the Democratic Opposition of Serbia—a broad alliance of those seeking Slobodan Milošević's downfall, among them the Democratic Party (Serbia) Otpor would later merge with—received in excess of $30 million to "purchase cell phones and computers for DOS's leadership and to recruit and train an army of 20,000 election monitors" as well as to supplement them with "a sophisticated marketing campaign with posters, badges and T-shirts." Donald L. Pressley, the assistant administrator at USAID said that several hundred thousand dollars were given to Otpor directly for similar purposes.

=== Transformation into a political party ===
The official announcement of Otpor's transformation into a political party was made on 19 November 2003, days after the parliamentary elections had been set for 23 December. The party didn't name an official leader. However, cousins Slobodan Homen and Nenad Konstantinović played key roles. Asked about the new party's finances in November 2003, Konstantinović said it was funded by the Serbian companies.

Otpor started its election campaign on Saturday, 29 November 2003 by submitting its 250-person candidate list. In addition to former Otpor activists such as Slobodan Homen, Nenad Konstantinović, Ivan Marović, Predrag Lečić, Stanko Lazendić, and Srđan Milivojević, the candidate list featured established professionals in other arenas such as professor and anti-corruption campaigner Čedomir Čupić, political analyst Dušan Janjić, psychologist Žarko Trebješanin, lawyer Boža Pelević, and former Serbian Supreme Court vice-president Zoran Ivošević. The candidate list named "Otpor—Freedom, Solidarity and Justice" led by Čupić fared poorly, with only 62,116 votes (1.6% of total vote) in the 2003 Serbian parliamentary election, which left it out of the parliament (the census required a minimum of 5%).

By spring 2004, in the aftermath of the election, the organization faced more turmoil when Branimir Nikolić, a prominent activist from Otpor's Subotica chapter, publicly accused the party central, namely Homen and Konstantinović, of embezzlement. Soon after, another member of Otpor, Zoran Matović, joined Nikolić's accusations, claiming that out of the €2.1 million that came into the organization during 2001 and 2002, more than half went missing. Responding to the accusations in both instances, Homen announced his intention to sue both Nikolić and Matović.

=== End ===
In early September 2004, amid internal turmoil, the remnants of Otpor merged into the Democratic Party led by Boris Tadić.

The observer reaction in Serbia to the dissolution of Otpor was mixed. Some talked of Otpor's "ideologically heterogeneous membership that in addition to progressives also contained those well infected with Milošević's war propaganda", seeing the organization's eventual demise in the post-Milošević period as the victory of the latter over the former, while others believed Otpor's failure in the political arena was caused by its inability to disassociate itself from foreign aid.

== Legacy ==
In addition to contributing to Slobodan Milošević's overthrow, Otpor has become the model for similar youth movements around Eastern Europe. MTV granted Otpor the Free Your Mind award in 2000. There were several award-winning documentaries made about the movement, most notably Making of The Revolution by Eric Van Den Broek and Katarina Rejger (launched at the Amnesty International Film Festival in 2001) and Bringing Down A Dictator by Steve York, which won a Peabody Award in 2002, narrated by Martin Sheen. It has reportedly been seen by over 23 million people around the world.

Otpor members were instrumental in inspiring and providing hands-on training to several other civic youth organizations in Eastern Europe and elsewhere, including Kmara in the Republic of Georgia (itself partly responsible for the downfall of Eduard Shevardnadze), PORA (black) (which was part of the Orange Revolution) and Vidsich (opposing the president Viktor Yanukovych) in Ukraine, Zubr in Belarus (opposing the president Alexander Lukashenko), MJAFT! in Albania, Oborona in Russia (opposing the president Vladimir Putin), KelKel in Kyrgyzstan (active in the revolution that brought down the president Askar Akayev), Bolga in Uzbekistan (opposing Islam Karimov) and Nabad-al-Horriye in Lebanon. A similar group of students was present in Venezuela against Hugo Chávez. In 2008, an April 6 Youth Movement was founded in Egypt, which facilitated and joined the 2011 Egyptian protests, and took advice from Otpor in the process.

In 2002, some former Otpor members, most notably Slobodan Đinović and Srđa Popović, founded the Centre for Applied Nonviolent Action and Strategies (CANVAS). This NGO disseminated the lessons learned from their successful nonviolent struggle through scores of trainings and workshops for pro-democracy activists and others around the world, including in Egypt, Palestine, Western Sahara, West Papua, Eritrea, Belarus, Azerbaijan, Tonga, Burma and Zimbabwe as well as labor, anti-war, and immigration rights activists in the United States.

In their search for lessons learned from other activist movements, the April 6 Youth Movement in Egypt consulted with Otpor members and adopted some of their strategies in their rallying for the 2011 Egyptian revolution.

In interviews, the leaders and consultants of Otpor described their involvement in the Arab Spring.

=== Commemorative reunions and usage of Otpor symbols ===
In the years since its dissolution, Otpor's symbols and imagery occasionally reappeared in Serbian political life. Some of the former Otpor activists also organized a few official commemorative gatherings.

In April 2008, during the election campaign ahead of the parliamentary election, the clenched fist was stenciled on several walls in Novi Sad. This led to an announcement of Otpor's reactivation by its former activist Nenad Šeguljev, however nothing ever came of it.

Later that year on 13 November, Serbian president Boris Tadić held a reception to commemorate the 10th anniversary of Otpor's founding. Former activists Srđa Popović, Slobodan Đinović, Slobodan Homen, Nenad Konstantinović, Dejan Ranđić, Ivan Andrić, Andreja Stamenković, Milja Jovanović, Branko Ilić, Srđan Milivojević, Jovan Ratković, Predrag Lečić, Vlada Pavlov, Stanko Lazendić, Miloš Gagić, and Siniša Šikman were on hand at the presidential palace at Andrićev Venac, giving Tadić an old Otpor poster. Tadić underscored Otpor's "important role in the democratization of Serbia". The next day, in Stari dvor, the exhibition of Otpor's materials was opened with Belgrade mayor Dragan Đilas saluting the former movement for "the courage shown in the fight for democratic changes and thus enabling others to live in a normal country".

In July 2011, posters with clenched fist and a message "Pruži Otpor svakoj lošoj vlasti" (Resist all bad authorities) appeared all over the city of Bor, protesting the local authorities' decision to build a roundabout.

In October 2011, the Democratic Party (DS) official web site (ds.org.rs) was taken down by unknown hackers who left the Otpor logo on the site.

== See also ==
- Special operations
- Subversion
- Psyops
- Active measures
- Colour revolution
- From Dictatorship to Democracy
- Student List
