= Gornja Gorevnica =

- Village
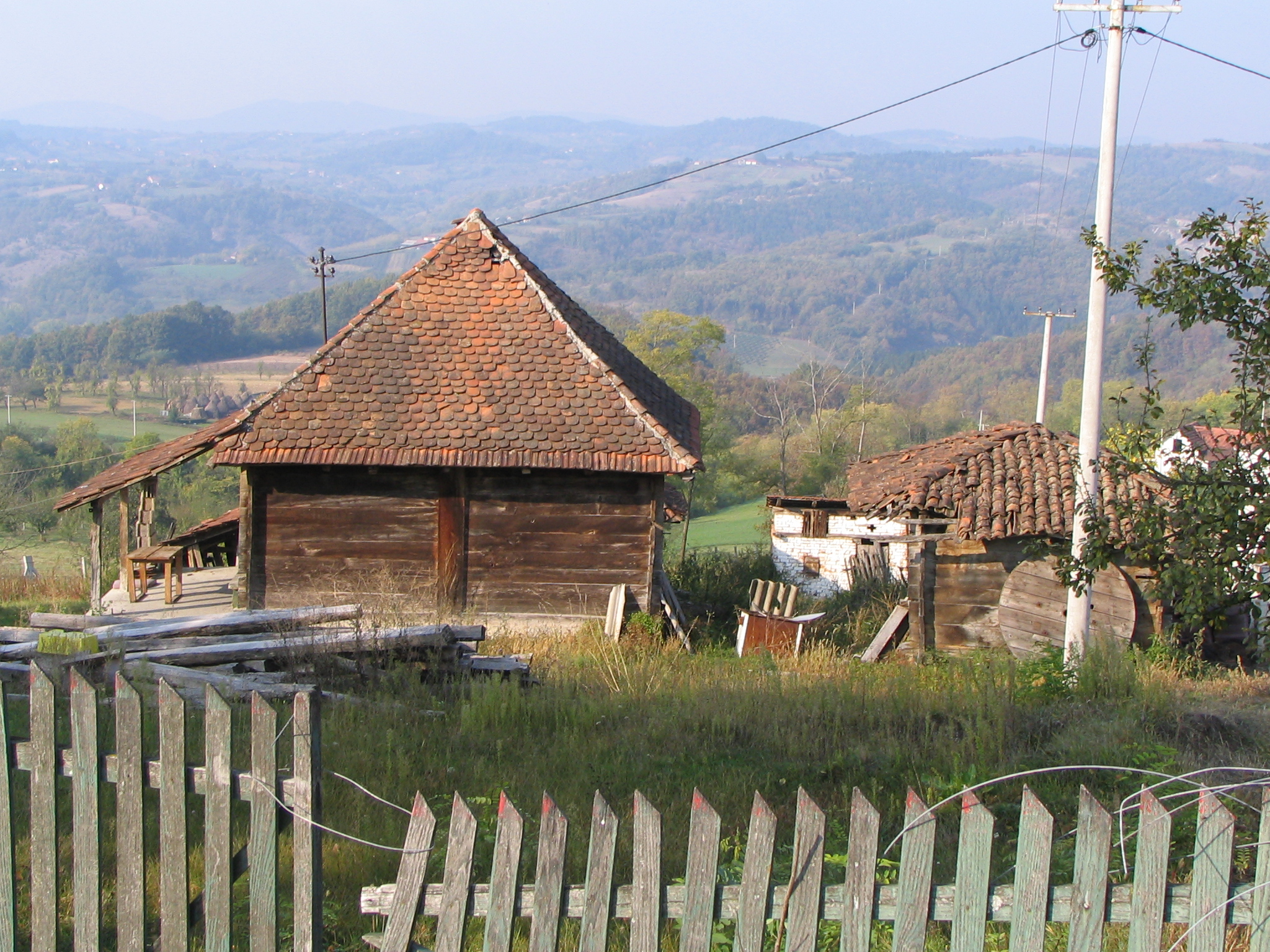

- Location within Serbia
- Coordinates: 43°58′N 20°18′E
- Country: Serbia
- District: Moravica District
- Municipality: Čačak

Area
  - Total: 24.20 km^{2} (9.34 sq mi)
- Elevation: 800 m (2,600 ft)

Population (2011)
  - Total: 1,299
  - Density: 53.68/km^{2} (139.0/sq mi)
- Time zone: UTC+1 (CET)
  - Summer (DST): UTC+2 (CEST)

Gornja Gorevnica (Serbian Cyrillic: Горња Горевница) is a village in the municipality of Čačak, Serbia. According to the 2011 census, the village had a population of 1,299 people.
