= Srđa Popović (activist) =

Serbian political activist and leader of Otpor (born 1973)

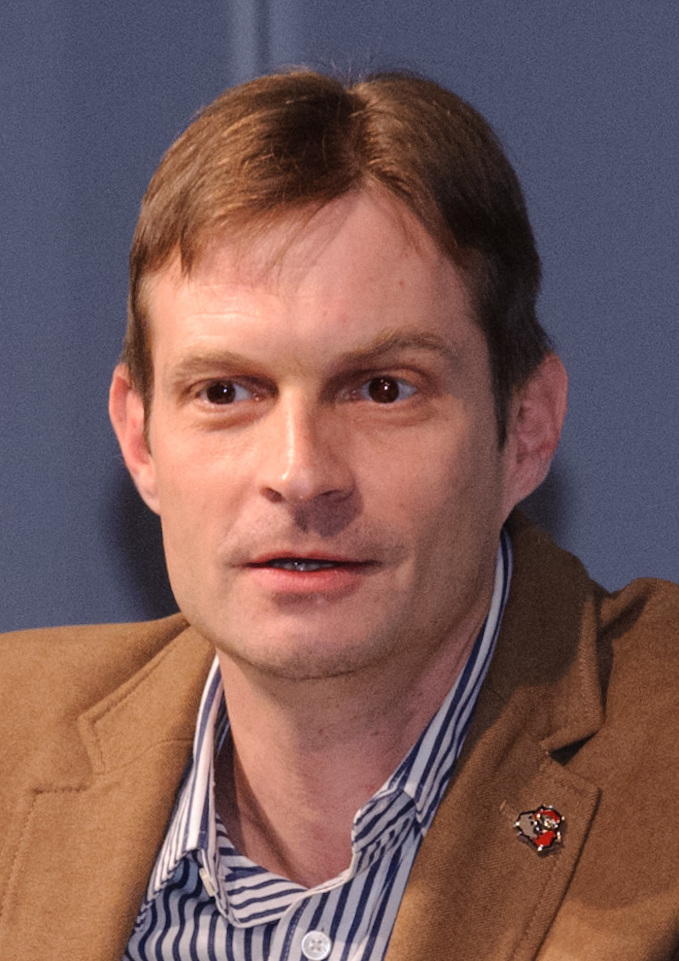
- Popović in 2012

Member of the National Assembly of Serbia
- In office January 2001 – March 2004

Lord Rector of the University of St Andrews
- In office October 2017 – October 2020
- Preceded by: Catherine Stihler
- Succeeded by: Leyla Hussein

Environmental adviser of the Prime Minister of Serbia
- In office January 2001 – March 2003

Personal details
- Born: 1 February 1973 (age 53) Belgrade, SR Serbia, SFR Yugoslavia
- Party: Democratic (DS) (1992–2004)
- Spouse: Marija "Maša" Stanisavljević (m. 2011)
- Education: University of Belgrade
- Occupation: Political activist Leader of Otpor (1998–2002); Leader of CANVAS (2004–present)
- Profession: Biologist

Srđa Popović (Serbian Cyrillic: Срђа Поповић, born 1 February 1973) is a Serbian political activist. He was a leader of the student movement Otpor that helped topple Serbian president Slobodan Milošević. After briefly pursuing a political career in Serbia, he established the Centre for Applied Nonviolent Action and Strategies (CANVAS) in 2003 and published Blueprint for Revolution in 2015. CANVAS has worked with pro-democracy activists from more than 50 countries, promoting the use of non-violent resistance in achieving political and social goals.

In October 2017, he was elected Rector of the University of St Andrews, succeeding Catherine Stihler.

== Early life ==
Popović was born in Belgrade, where both of his parents worked in television.

He played bass guitar in a goth rock band called BAAL, which was fronted by Andrej Aćin who later turned to film making. They released one album in 1993 called Između božanstva i ništavila.

== Political career ==
In parallel to music, Popović joined the Democratic Party's (DS) youth wing called Demokratska omladina. At the party conference in January 1994, he became the president of Demokratska omladina working under the also newly elected party leader Zoran Đinđić.

Although remaining a DS member, in 1998 with the establishment of Otpor!, Popović's activity in the party took a back seat to his engagement with the new movement.

Shortly after the overthrow of Milošević, Popović left Otpor to return to his political career in Serbia, becoming a Democratic Party (DS) MP in the National Assembly as well as an environmental adviser to newly appointed prime minister Zoran Đinđić.

== Books ==
Popović is the co-author with Matthew Miller of Blueprint for Revolution: How to Use Rice Pudding, Lego Men, and Other Non-Violent Techniques to Galvanize Communities, Overthrow Dictators, or Simply Change the World (2015). Blueprint for Revolution was met with positive reviews The Guardian called it "fantastically readable" and "brilliant", pointing to the usefulness and ingenuity of the ideas for creative nonviolent dissent it offers. Critic Tina Rosenberg (The New York Times) wrote that the work of Popović and Đinović draws on the insights of Gene Sharp, a pioneer and leading theorist in the field of nonviolent resistance, but also manages to "refine" and extend his key ideas. The review also praised the book for challenging conventional wisdom on the efficacy of peaceful movements and "cheerfully blowing up" common misconceptions about their internal structure, tactics, and chances of success. Blueprint for Revolution was nominated for the Atlantic Magazine's book of the month. It was originally published in the United States as well as in Canada, Australia, the United Kingdom, Germany, France, and Serbia. It has since been translated into Serbian, French, German, Spanish, and Turkish. Popović has been on book promoting tours in both the US and UK.

Popović has also authored or co-authored various CANVAS publications, available for free on the organization's website. Nonviolent Struggle: 50 Crucial Points and the CANVAS Core Curriculum: A Guide to Effective Nonviolent Struggle both elaborate on how activists should approach the vital stages of organizing a nonviolent movement: comparatively assessing their capabilities against those of the regime, formulating a clear plan for action, implementing it as efficiently as possible, and responding to ensuing repression from the authorities without jeopardizing their goals and commitment to nonviolence. Making Oppression Backfire, which Popovic co-authored with Tori Porell, more specifically examines how activists can make significant gains in the asymmetrical struggle against a regime's repressive apparatus, through knowledge and preparation. It illustrates two key principles - firstly, that of "creating a dilemma" for the regime, which has to either tolerate the movement's actions and appear powerless or respond with force and risk alienating members of the larger community or publicly embarrassing itself. Secondly, it provides insights into how to best take care of the movement's "foot soldiers" – its activists and demonstrators- foster cohesion, and cultivate a sense of community. The site also contains a brief illustrated chronology of the evolution of Otpor! and an examination of the unique features which allowed it to win over a large number of Serbs and mobilize solidarity to effect a profound political transformation.

== Activism ==
=== Otpor! ===
Popović was one of the founders and leaders of the Serbian nonviolent resistance group Otpor!. It was founded in Belgrade on 10 October 1998, by a small group of student protestors, in direct response to the university and Media Acts (passed earlier the same year). The organization was founded as a leaderless movement implementing the principles of nonviolent resistance in order to oppose the violent policies of the Milosevic regime and its constant infringements upon Serbs' fundamental democratic rights. In December 1998, Otpor organized its first major gathering - at the Faculty of Electrical Engineering. The demonstrators, about a thousand university students, then marched to the Faculty of Philosophy, in solidarity with their peers who had been locked up by the authorities in the latter so that they would be unable to join the peaceful protest. Just two days later, about seventy Otpor members took part in the "We are paving the way" march and walked the 83 km distance between Belgrade and Novi Sad.

After the NATO bombing, Otpor somewhat changed its goals and focused on campaigns which often provoked the regime in humorous and ironic ways, thus drawing citizens' attention and raising their motivation. One vivid example was the "birthday party for Milošević" demonstration organized in Niš, during which more than two thousand citizens had a chance to write down what they wished Mr Milosevic for his birthday on a joint birthday card. Along with the card, gifts, including a one-way ticket to the Hague, prison uniform, books by Mira Markovic, handcuffs and a birthday cake in the shape of a five-pointed star served to everybody present at the end of the action, were received on behalf of president Milosevic.

Numerous campaigns such as this one mobilized the whole of Serbia, alleviated Serbs' fear of violent reprisals by the regime, and inspired confidence. The most important ones took place in the period 1999–2000, allowing Otpor to evolve from a students' to a people's democratic movement. It rapidly gained popularity among student activists and expanded from a small organization to a large network of activists and supporters. The resistance movement attracted a diverse range of opposition leaders and brought them together for discussions, from which the resistance movement established common goals against the Milosevic regime. These goals were concretely articulated in the ¨Declaration for the Future of Serbia¨, issued in July, 1999. The Declaration became Otpor's strategic document defining the main problems, objectives of the movement and the methods to be used. What is more, it was endorsed and signed by prominent critics of the regime and all important student organizations in Serbia, becoming the cornerstone of a united, coherent, resistance to Milošević.

Persistent resistance, sympathetic media coverage, and the international attention it attracted allowed the Otpor! movement to finally pressure Milošević to step down from the presidency. Shortly after the 5 October 2000 revolution, Popović left Otpor! to pursue a political career in Serbia, becoming a Democratic Party (DS) MP in the Serbian assembly as well as an environmental adviser to prime minister Zoran Đinđić.

=== CANVAS ===
In 2003, Popović and former Otpor! member Slobodan Đinović co-founded the Centre for Applied Non Violent Actions and Strategies (CANVAS), an organization that advocates for the use of nonviolence resistance to promote human rights and democracy. Established in Belgrade, CANVAS has worked with pro-democracy activists from more than 50 countries, including Iran, Zimbabwe, Burma, Venezuela, Ukraine, Georgia, Palestine, Western Sahara, West Papua, Eritrea, Belarus, Azerbaijan and Tonga and, recently, Tunisia and Egypt. Shortly after its founding, the organization trained a number of young Georgian activists who formed a vital part of the movement which elected young Mikheil Saakashvili. A year later, CANVAS played a similar role in Ukraine's Orange Revolution.

In the Maldives, the popular movement against the president's oppressive rule drew from Popović's insights on the role of humor and satire in nonviolent struggle, and soon managed to gain support from prominent musicians, artists, and popular figures. Despite many observers' doubts about the applicability of nonviolent tactics to a small nation with an overwhelmingly Islamic culture, like the Maldives, the activists eventually prevailed; in 2008, they watched the old regime fall down, when President Gayoom was compelled to amend the Constitution to allow for genuine multi-party presidential elections and subsequently lost to opposition candidate Mohamed Nasheed.

On the eve of the Arab Spring, CANVAS provided training to a number of young activists from Egypt and Tunisia. Some of the training sessions and their impact on the participants were described in Popović's Blueprint for Revolution.

It has been estimated that Iranian activists downloaded Popović's guide to nonviolent struggle more than 17,000 times, when protests against Mahmoud Ahmadinedjad began in 2007.

Canvas has several full-time employees and simultaneously operates an international network of trainers and experts with experience in successful non-violent movements. Since CANVAS relies on private funding, there is no fee for attending workshops led by its trainers worldwide and revolutionary know-how can also be downloaded for free online.

In 2006, Popović and two other CANVAS members - Slobodan Đinović and Andrej Milivojević - authored a book called Nonviolent Struggle: 50 Crucial Points, a how-to guide for nonviolent struggle.

In November 2011, Popović was one of the speakers at the TEDx Kraków conference. His speech, titled "How to Topple a Dictator", focused on the phenomenon of "people power" and the new opportunities for the mobilization of this power recent developments have offered. While people power has effected political transformations for centuries, claims Popovich, activists nowadays can much more readily learn reproducible, reliable tactics for nonviolent resistance and use the new media to advance their movement. At the same time, he articulates there timeless principles, which precede the success of any nonviolent revolution: unity, planning, and discipline. Since the video of his speech was released in December 2011, it has received over 250,000 views.

Popovic has also spoken at the Oslo Freedom Forum, a leading world conference which brings together activists and political dissidents from around the world, dubbed "the Davos for human rights" by The Economist. His first talk at the Forum, "Revolution 101", offered a historical overview of nonviolent movements, examining their often underappreciated rates of success and capacity to bring about more enduring democracies. Whereas the 20th century centered on the arms race, Popovic suggested in his talk, that the 21st century must focus on the race for education, as the tool through which people will change the world and oppose brutal regimes. In a more recent edition of the Forum, in 2017, he took part in a discussion panel outlining strategies for peacefully countering the troubling rise of illiberalism in the West in the last few years. Popovic participated in the 2017 San Francisco Freedom Forum, also organized by the Human Rights Foundation.

== Other activities ==
=== Green Fist ===
Simultaneous to his early 2000s political engagement, Popović, together with former colleagues from Otpor! Predrag Lečić and Andreja Stamenković, founded the environmental non-governmental organization named Green Fist. Conceptualized as an "ecological movement", it attempted to transfer some of Otpor's mass appeal into environmental issues by using similar imagery, but soon folded.

=== Ecotopia ===
Popović heads the Ecotopia fund, the non-profit organization dealing with the environmental issues, financially backed by various Serbian governmental institutions as well as the private sector. In 2009, the fund organized a wide environmental campaign featuring well-known Serbian actors and media personalities with television spots and newspaper ads.

=== Waging Nonviolence ===
In 2009, Popovic became a founding member of the board of advisers of Waging Nonviolence, "a source for original news and analysis about struggles for justice and peace around the globe." Popovic was removed from the board in the wake of the Stratfor controversy (see below).

=== Teaching ===
In addition to activism, Popovic also runs educational workshops and lectures at a variety of forums and universities. Additionally, he has taught courses on nonviolence tactics and political struggle at Grinnell College, Harvard University, Colorado College, New York University, Johns Hopkins University, Columbia University, Northeastern University, and Belgrade University. Popovic and the Centre for Applied Nonviolent Actions and Strategies have partnered with Northeastern University's Co-Op program, hosting interns and running them through nonviolence workshops.

=== 53rd Rector of the University of St Andrews ===
Popović was one of two contenders in the 2017 rectorial elections for the position of rector of the University of St Andrews. The rector is elected every three years by the matriculated students of the university. Popović was elected Rector on 13 October 2017, garnering more than twice the votes of his opponent Willie Rennie.

== Honors and awards ==
Foreign Policy magazine listed Popović as one of the "Top 100 Global Thinkers" of 2011 for inspiring the Arab Spring protesters directly and indirectly and educating activists about nonviolent social change in the Middle East.

In January 2012, Wired included him among the "50 people who will change the world".

Peace Research Institute Oslo's (PRIO) director Kristian Berg Harpviken speculated that Popović is among the candidates for the 2012 Nobel Peace Prize.

World Economic Forum in Davos listed Popović as one of Young Global Leaders for 2013.

Tufts University Awarded Popović, along with CANVAS, with the Jean Mayer Global Citizenship Award in February 2016.

As of November 2017, Popović serves as rector of the University of St Andrews.

In 2020 Popovic's work has earned him the Penn State University McCourtney Institute for Democracy's Brown Democracy Medal.

== Controversy ==
=== Involvement with Stratfor ===
The Stratfor email leak in 2011 included correspondence between Srda Popovic and analysts at Stratfor. In December 2013 Steve Horn and US Uncut co-founder Carl Gibson published an article that sought to shed light on Popovic's interactions with Stratfor, and criticized him for his apparently extensive interaction with Stratfor analysts, which ranged from passing them intelligence to inviting them to his wedding.

The article garnered heavy criticism from the New York-based culture-jammer Andy Bichlbaum (who sat with Popovic on the board of Waging Nonviolence at the time). Gibson and Horn stood by their original denunciation of Popovic, sticking to arguments debunked by Bichlbaum, that Popovic gave information about grassroots activists to Stratfor without their consent, and served as a liaison between Stratfor and Muneer Satter, a prominent investment banker who worked at the time for Goldman Sachs.

CANVAS has been listed as a terrorist organization by the United Arab Emirates.

== Personal life ==
Popovic married radio reporter Marija Stanisavljevic in September 2011.

Academic offices
Preceded by Catherine Stihler	Rector of the University of St Andrews; 2017—2020	Succeeded by Leyla Hussein
