= Dragan Babić =

Serbian and Yugoslav journalist

- Born: 3 September 1937; Kruševac, Kingdom of Yugoslavia
- Died: 23 July 2013 (aged 75); Vranje, Serbia
- Occupation: Journalist
- Partner: Liv Ullmann

Dragan Babić (3 September 1937 – 23 July 2013) was a Serbian and Yugoslav journalist.

He was born in Kruševac, Kingdom of Yugoslavia, and died in Vranje, Serbia.

His major works include the books Journey to the End of Language and You Maybe Think Different, and the documentary Like a Soap Bubble. He created several television shows including the children's show Dvogled ("Binoculars").
