= Riccardo Campogiani =

Swedish murder victim (1990–2007)

- Born: 8 October 1990; Sweden
- Died: 7 October 2007 (aged 16); Stockholm, Sweden

Riccardo Campogiani (8 October 1990 – 7 October 2007) was a Swedish teenager of Italian descent, who was beaten to death at a party in central Stockholm, Sweden.

== Death ==
Campogiani died at the hospital from severe injuries sustained after multiple kicks to the head. He was 16 at the time of death on 7 October 2007. The death sparked a media sensation as five other teenagers Campogiani's age were found guilty of manslaughter – the five received different sentences, but because of their young age (all under the age of 18) none could be sentenced to prison. One of the five was acquitted and released.

The Campogiani case was special as it involved youth from upper-class areas of Stockholm, with both the victim and the defendants coming from families of wealthy backgrounds.

== Reactions and manifestations ==
The murder became world news when Anton Abele received an award at the 2007 MTV Europe Music Awards, as a result of his work against street violence following Campogiani's death.

Campogiani's death became headline news in Sweden with a number of celebrities speaking out against teenage violence in Sweden. Abele created a Swedish Facebook group called "Bevara oss från gatuvåldet” (Save us from street violence). In one week, the group grew to having more than 100,000 members. In addition, on 12 October 2007, Anton Abele arranged the demonstration “Stop street violence” with more than 10,000 young people and adults participating in Stockholm. Simultaneous with the massive demonstration in Stockholm, anti-violence demonstrations were also held in other major cities in the Nordic region.

Carl XVI Gustaf and Victoria, Crown Princess of Sweden both paid tribute to Riccardo Campogiani and the work of Abele. The crown princess also attended a memorial service for Campogiani. The Campogiani family had close ties with the Swedish royal family and other high-class society people in Stockholm.

Campogiani was also a good friend of electronic producer Alesso, his death pushing the latter to succeed in the music industry. The murder was referenced halfway through the music video for his song Years on YouTube.
