= Danas =

Serbian newspaper

- 9 June 2017 front page (20th anniversary edition)
- Type: Daily newspaper
- Format: Berliner
- Owner: United Media (United Group)
- Editor: Dragoljub Petrović
- Founded: 9 June 1997; 28 years ago
- Political alignment: Centre-left; Pro-Europeanism; Atlanticism; Anti-nationalism
- Language: Serbian (Latin script)
- Headquarters: Alekse Nenadovića 19-23, Belgrade, Serbia
- Website: www.danas.rs

Danas (pronounced [ˈdǎnas], lit. 'Today') is a United Group-owned daily newspaper of record published in Belgrade, Serbia. It is a left-oriented media, promoting social-democracy and European Union integration. It is a vocal media supporter of Serbian NGO activities towards human rights and minorities protection.

== History ==
The first issue of Danas appeared on 9 June 1997. It was established in 1997 after a group of discontented journalists from the Naša borba newspaper walked out after getting into a conflict with the paper's new private majority owner.

In the period since the regime change, Danas has been one of the rare Serbian newspapers (or Serbian media outlets in general, for that matter) to ignore the commercial temptations of yellow journalism. Its circulation has been continually in decline. Most of the foreign investors in Serbian media market have been avoiding it. Danas publishes political comic strips drawn by the famous caricaturist Predrag Koraksić Corax.

== Staff ==
- Predrag Koraksić Corax, Serbian caricaturist
- Vesna Ninković, Serbian journalist
- Svetislav Basara, Serbian writer
- Borka Pavićević, Yugoslav-Serbian dramaturge
- Marčelo, Serbian rapper
- Aleksej Kišjuhas, Serbian social scientist

== Ownership and publishing ==
The paper is published and managed by an entity called Dan Graf d.o.o. – a limited liability company based in Belgrade. The company's ownership was previously shared by six people : Dušan Mitrović (26.67%), Zdravko Huber (24.22%), Radomir Ličina (20.92%), Vesna Ninković (13.94%), Grujica Spasović (11.10%), and Rade Radovanović (3.15%). However, in March 2021, the company was sold to Luxembourg-based publisher United Media for 1.5 million USD.

== See also ==
- List of newspapers in Serbia
- Media in Serbia
