= Kristijan Golubović =

Public personality and martial artist

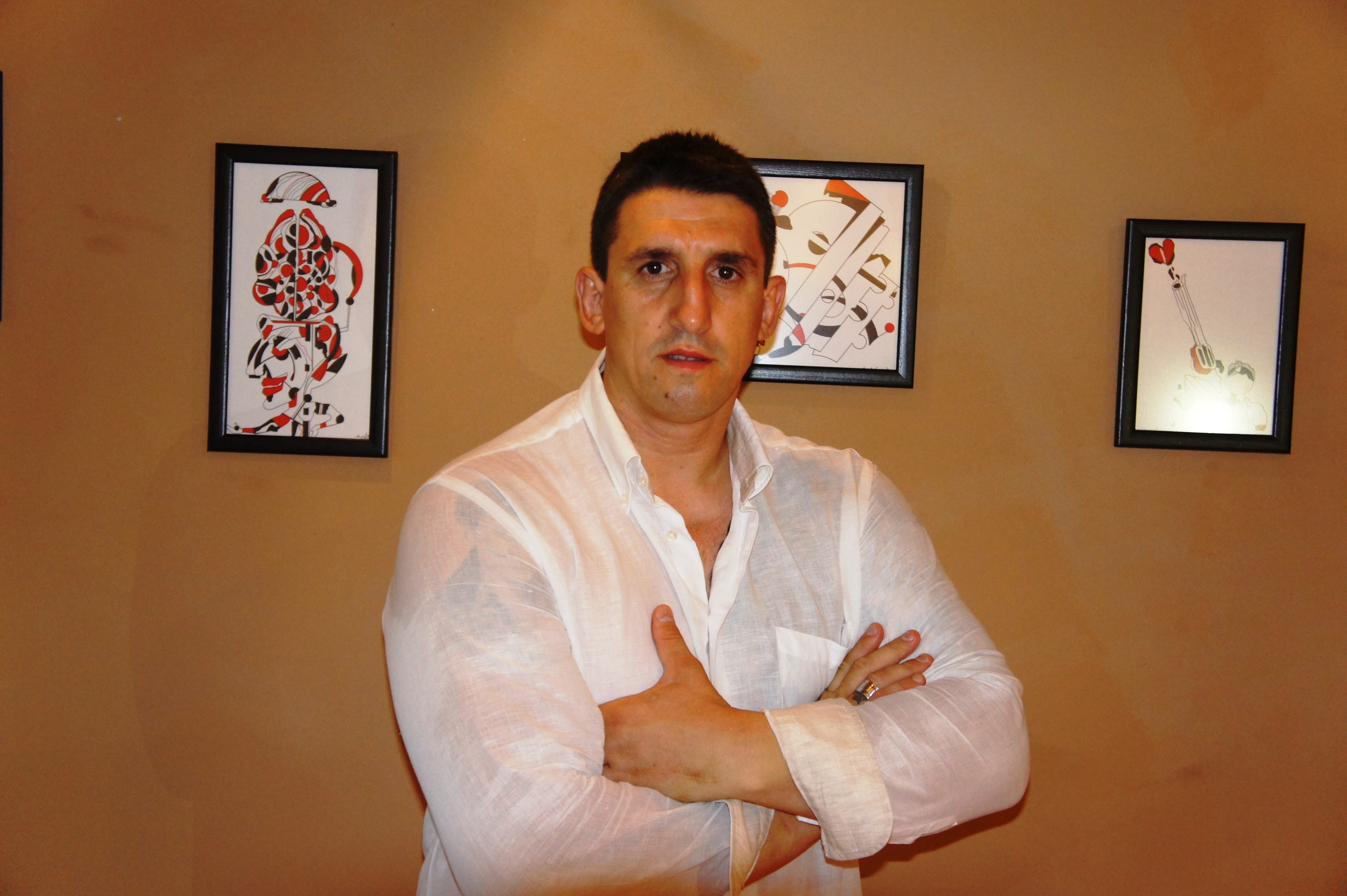
- Born: Aleksandar Golubović; November 30, 1969 (age 56); Munich, West Germany

Aleksandar "Kristijan" Golubović (Serbian Cyrillic: Александар "Кристијан" Голубовић; born November 30, 1969) is a Serbian media personality and criminal.

After spending four and a half years in prison for activities related to drugs in Požarevac, he was released on January 9, 2009. From 2016 to 2020 he was imprisoned again for the same level of crime, serving time for his penalty in Zabela prison. On many occasions, Kristijan claimed prison did not help him nor did it save his life.

== Biography ==
=== Early life, 1980s ===
Born to Srboljub and Milanka Golubović, Serb gastarbeiters living in Munich, Kristijan did not meet his father until primary school since he was away serving a long-term prison sentence for taking part in various criminal activities. His mother was a stewardess at JAT. His father was imprisoned in Goli Otok prison.

Golubović moved to Belgrade, SR Serbia with his mother and sister in 1987, first settling in the Zvezdara neighbourhood and then moving to 50 Braće Jerković Street in Voždovac. Already no stranger to juvenile delinquent activity, the youngster continued along the same path with street fighting, often involving knives and guns. He first harmed a person with a knife near the "Beograđanka" building. He also started painting, mostly while under arrest.

In December 1987, Golubović beat up a patron at a kafana in Boleč.

In May 1989, he instigated a fist fight versus Slavko "Mija Pijuk" Mijović (Mija the Pickaxe), the godfather of notorious gangster Arkan) in front of Disco Luv in the Belgrade neighbourhood of Voždovac. Mija Pijuk's bodyguard Safet "Džimi" Buljuku began firing shots at Golubović, hitting him in the legs. In October 1989, Golubović initiated a brawl at the Branko Krsmanović club, leading to several shots being fired.

=== 1990s ===
In the early morning hours of Sunday, February 25, 1990, Golubović was one of the perpetrators of an infamous act of violence in Belgrade's Hotel Mažestik. Along with his best friend at the time Dragan "Gagi" Nikolić, a heavily armed Golubović burst into the hotel's disco bar looking for a rival gangster. Since they did not find him, 24-year-old Nikolić and 20-year-old Golubović shot up and ransacked the place, destroying it in the process before fleeing the scene. Since the hotel's disco bar was a favorite mobster hangout, the incident gained them notoriety with the authorities, considering that many prominent and powerful mob figures were present to witness the shooting of bottles and furniture.

To escape prosecution in Serbia, Golubović went back to Germany, but soon found himself serving a three-year sentence in Düsseldorf on an armed robbery charge from a few years earlier. Due to being underage when the robbery was committed, he served the sentence in a juvenile prison. In 1993, German authorities extradited Golubović back to Serbia where he was wanted for a variety of criminal acts from the 1988–1990 period.

He is well known for telling tall tales about people no longer here to defend themselves. He is a long time friend of Milorad Ulemek and has maintained relations with Arkan through him. The story Golobović claims is true, that Ulemek sent him to Erdut to the headquarters of the Serbian Volunteer Guard (Arkanovi Tigrovi), where he was asked to fight for them, but declined. Then he went as far as to say that Ražnatović asked Golubović to assassinate Serbian politician Vojislav Šešelj, but he refused.

On July 23, 1994, Golubović had an altercation with Milorad Majkić, owner of Casino Aleksandar at Čumićevo sokače. Majkić claimed Golubović tried to extort DM 10,000 from him.

Golubović left Serbia for Greece to avoid prison. There he became the worker of a former Yugoslav group that worked in Athens.

Golubović was featured in a 1996 documentary about Serbia's underworld called Vidimo se u čitulji that was filmed between 1994 and 1996. He is one of only a few individuals, out of dozens featured in the film, still alive today.

=== 2000s ===
In 2002, he escaped from Korydallos Prison, where he was sentenced to 14 1/2 years for stealing two BMW cars and an armed robbery. During his time in prison, he maintained a relationship with Arkan's daughter Anđela Ražnatović. Golubović said he wanted to marry her but the relationship was short.

Golubović got arrested in Greece on December 25, 2002, on a Serbian arrest warrant because of the criminal citation stemming from the July 1994 incident with Milorad Majkić. The citation claimed Golubović slapped Majkić while trying to extort DM 10,000 from him. Following three and a half-month stay in detention, he got extradited to Serbia on April 16, 2003. At the first court date in May 2003, Golubović denied extorting Majkić but admitted slapping him.

He was arrested in Operation Sablja, a crackdown on organized crime in Serbia following Prime Minister Zoran Đinđić's assassination, for being the leader of a criminal group that extorted €15,000 from a businessman from Sremska Mitrovica; the sentence was initially 6 years, but the case ended with 1 and a half-years.

On the night of March 17, 2004, Golubović and famous Serbian turbo-folk singer Ceca Ražnatović (widow of the murdered Arkan) gathered protesters in front of the government building in Belgrade to rally against the situation in Kosovo where more than 36 Serbian Orthodox Churches had been burned the same day in an outbreak of Muslim Albanian violence against the Serb natives of the province.

On December 12, 2005, Golubović got sentenced to six years of prison by the Special Court in Belgrade on illegal arms and racketeering charges of €3,000 and gold jewelry theft from the Arsić's, a married couple from Aranđelovac. The case was appealed and the sentence got reduced to four and a half years, which he served at Zabela prison in Požarevac.

On January 9, 2009, he was released from the Zabela prison where he had spent four and a half years. He made a rap song together with Elitni odredi called Jack i Chivas (Jack Daniels and Chivas Regal). He was denied entry to Croatia in 2009 when he was going to fight in the Millenium Fighting Challenge MMA event held in Split, mayor Željko Kerum denied his entrance and police were ready to stop Golubović. "He has a history of crime and suspicious relations with the criminal world and is not welcomed to Split or Croatia, nor be a sport example."

On January 16, 2010, Golubović, his mother and five other members of his criminal group were arrested in Belgrade on charges of narcotics trade in Novi Pazar and Belgrade starting in August 2009. He and his two companions were intercepted at a drug exchange of 25 grams of heroin when they exited Saint Mark's Church. He had the previous week been stopped by police who found 180 grams of marijuana in his Audi TT. His friend in the car claimed the marijuana was his and Golubović was held for 4 hours before being set free. The police then searched his home in Višnjica and found a gun and ammunition without a serial number, a Beretta was found in his mother's house. He was sentenced for narcotics trade, illegal arms and explosives possession. He allegedly tried suicide by hanging in his cell the days following the arrest. The motive of the suicide attempt was that he felt devastated that he had caused the arrest of his mother who had nothing to do with this. She is quoted as having said I should have aborted you! He shared cell with Elez gang, leader Darko Elez and Zemun clan hitman Nikola Bajić. His wife was briefly held in March for the finding of a land mine in her car.

=== 2010s ===
During the 2010s, Kristijan was constantly in and out of prison, awaiting trial. In early January 2016, Kristijan released a rap song with DeNiro called Živim kao Šef. Also, on May 9, he had his third mixed martial arts fight, returning to the sport 6 years after his previous fight, which he won by disqualification. It was held in Vienna against the Albanian Agim Abdullahu. He lost the fight by TKO in the first round. After the fight, Kristijan made statements on social media that it was rigged and unfair, claiming it was the referee's fault. On March 16, Golubović was sentenced to 4 years and 1 month in the Zabela prison. While in prison. On October 9, Golubović released another rap song called Moj Czas along with a fellow rapper from Poland called Brex.

== Popular culture ==
In 1993, he appeared on the album Zbogom, Srbijo by Serbian band Riblja Čorba, singing with band's frontman Bora Đorđević in the song Kamenko i Kremenko (Serbian names of Fred and Barney from The Flintstones).

He was part of highly popular reality shows, such as Farma, Zadruga, and Parovi.

== Mixed martial arts record ==
Professional record breakdown
3 matches	2 wins	1 loss
By knockout	1	0
By submission	0	1
By disqualification	1	0

Res.	Record	Opponent	Method	Event	Date	Round	Time	Location	Notes
Loss	2–1	Agim Abdullahu	Submission (TKO)	Night of Gladiator	May 9, 2015	1	N/A	Vienna, Austria	
Win	2–0	Stanislav Drakov	DQ (Drakov bit Golubovic's finger)	WKN Serbia – Kings of the Ring	December 13, 2009	2	N/A	Niš, Serbia	
Win	1–0	Marian Rusu	TKO (leg injury)	Ultra FC – Stop the Crime	October 31, 2009	1	0:24	Subotica, Serbia	
