= Nenad Vukasović =

Serbian politician

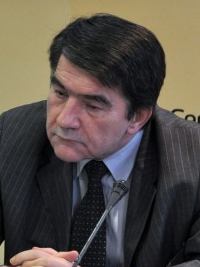
- Vukasović in December 2012
- Born: 11 October 1952 (age 73); Belgrade, FPR Yugoslavia
- Occupation: Lawyer
- Known for: Criminal defense of Zvezdan Jovanović

Nenad Vukasović (Serbian Cyrillic: Ненад Вукасовић; born 11 October 1952) is a Serbian lawyer and politician.

== Early life and career ==
Nenad Vukasović was born on 11 October 1952 in Belgrade. He studied at the University of Belgrade Faculty of Law.

== Career in law ==
After working at the Federal Secretariat of Internal Affairs from 1975 to 1990, Vukasović began his career as a lawyer in a law firm led by Veljko Guberina. He spent the next 14 years there, specializing in violent crime.

Vukasović opened his own law firm in 2004, working in high-profile cases such as the assassination of Prime Minister Zoran Đinđić where he served as the defender of Zvezdan Jovanović. During Jovanović's trial, Vukasović based his defense on the Third Bullet conspiracy theory.

Vukasović participated in the 2007 parliamentary election as president of Social Democracy. The party failed to win any seats.

== Personal life ==
In June 2012, Vukasović was attacked by two masked men. The attackers entered his office and sprayed acid into Vukasović's face. Members of the Bar Association of Serbia suspended their work for one day in protest.

As of 2021, Vukasović is serving as the Grand Chancellor of the Regular Grand Lodge of Serbia.
