= Sretko Kalinić =

Croatian Serb murderer

- Сретко Калинић
- Born: 25 February 1974 (age 52); Zadar, SR Croatia, SFR Yugoslavia
- Other names: Zver; Beli
- Occupation: Criminal
- Criminal charges: Murder, kidnappings, terrorism, racketeering

Sretko Kalinić (Serbian Cyrillic: Сретко Калинић; born 25 February 1974), also known as "Zver" (Serbian Cyrillic: Звер, lit. 'The Beast') or "Beli" (Serbian Cyrillic: Бели, lit. 'The White'), is a Croatian Serb gangster, contract killer and mass murderer, who holds dual Serbian and Croatian citizenship. He is best known as one of the conspirators in the assassination of Serbian Prime Minister Zoran Đinđić.

== Early life ==
Kalinić was born in Zadar in a Serb family. In the early 1990s, during the Croatian War of Independence, he was at one period a member of paramilitary unit called the Kninjas (Red berets) headed by Dragan Vasiljković ("Captain Dragan").

== Criminal career ==
After the war, Kalinić became one of the members of the notorious Zemun Clan, the largest Serbian criminal group, where he rose through the ranks. In the testimony of Dejan "Bugsy" Milenković, a former member of the Zemun Clan and protected witness, he accused Kalinić of being the cruelest member of the Clan, garnering the nickname "Beast". According to Milenković's testimony, Kalinić was '"a favorite murderer" of Dušan Spasojević "Šiptar", the head of the Zemun clan, and was responsible for the murder of at least twenty people.

In March 2003, Serbian Prime Minister Zoran Đinđić was assassinated under the orders of Zemun Clan leader Milorad "Legija" Ulemek and Dusan Spasojevic. On 23 May 2007 the Belgrade Special Court for Organised Crime found twelve men, including Kalinić, guilty of conspiring the murder of Serbian Prime Minister Zoran Đinđić. However, Kalinić and others went on the run following the assassination and could not be found. On 18 January 2008, Kalinić was sentenced by the Serbian court in absentia to 40 years imprisonment for involvement in killings, kidnappings, terrorist acts, and the murder of Đinđić.

In June 2010 he was found shot in the suburbs of Zagreb by fellow gangster Miloš Simović, also a conspirator in the assassination of Đinđić. Kalinić was taken to the hospital to be treated and questioned by the police.

== Arrest in Croatia ==
While recovering in the hospital, Kalinić offered cooperation to Croatian investigators, including testimony on the organization of the assassination of Đinđić, and the names of the people who ordered the murder of Zoran Vukojević, a protected witness. He admitted to murdering Vukojević as well as Zoran Pović in 2006; both were witnesses linked to the Đinđić assassination trial. According to a Croatian newspaper, Kalinić admitted participating in the murders of some twenty people in Serbia, Netherlands, Spain, and Croatia.

Despite being convicted of crimes in Serbia, it was noted that Kalinić would not be eligible for extradition to Serbia since he held Croatian citizenship and Croatian law forbids the extradition of their citizens (Kalinić is a citizen of both countries). Nevertheless, a few days later Serbian Minister of Justice Snežana Malović announced an extradition request for Kalinić to Croatia in hopes that Croatia would change their laws. It was later announced that the Croatian Sabor was working on adopting constitutional amendments in regards to regional criminals so they could be subject to extradition. The changes were approved and on August 25, Kalinić was extradited to Serbia.

== Victims ==
Sretko Kalinić was sentenced by a Serbian court following testimony from former members of the criminal Zemun Clan, Dejan Milenković and Saša Petrović. A large list of Kalinić's victims has been confirmed by his confession to Croatian investigators and statements of Miloš Simović to Serbian investigators.

Accordingly, Kalinić personally killed, assisted in the murders, or participated as a collaborator in the organization of murders of Đinđić, Zoran Vukojević (an ex-member of Zemun Clan and protected witness), as well as Zoran Pović, Sredoje Šljukić, Zoran Šljukić, Zoran Savić, Jovan Guzijan, Rade Cvetić, Todor Gradašević, former leader of paramilitary units Branislav Lainović, Zoran Davidović, Zoran Uskoković, Mirko Tomić, Radoslav Trlajić, Željko Vuletić, Željko Mihajlović, and Zoran Petrović.

Miloš Simović and Sretko Kalinić accused each other of the murder of their associate, Cvetko Simić, whose body parts, except for his head, were found in a lake near Zagreb.

According to ex members of the Zemun Clan, Dejan Milenković and Sasa Petrović, Kalinić enjoyed sadistically torturing his victims. In their testimony the two said Kalinić killed Zoran Savić, then broke his bones with a hammer, and then burned the rest of his body with acid. Kalinić participated in kidnappings for the Zemun Clan, where he brutally tortured the kidnapped victims. Among the well-known businessmen who were kidnapped by the Zemun Clan were Miroslav Mišković, Milija Babović, and Suvad Musić. Gordan Malić of Croatia's Jutarnji list claimed Kalinić's confession to Croatian investigators acknowledged that he eliminated traces of the murder victim in Spain by grinding victim's body parts in a meat grinder.

== See also ==
- Assassination of Zoran Đinđić
- Contract killing
- Organized crime
- Torture murder
- List of contract killers and hitmen
