= Assassination of Zoran Đinđić =

2003 murder in Belgrade, Serbia

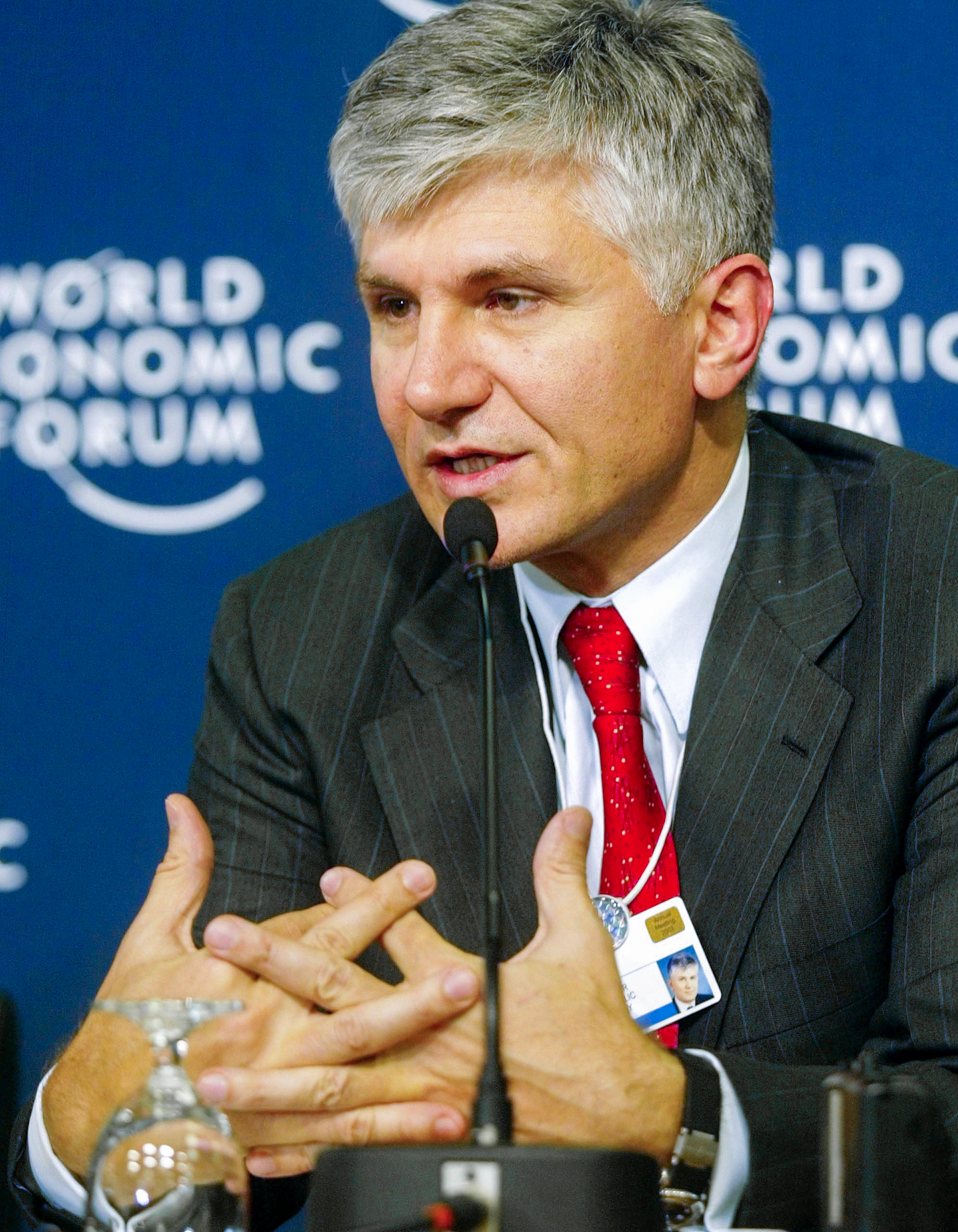
- Zoran Đinđić at Davos Conference
- Location: 44°48′24″N 20°27′36″E; Belgrade, Serbia and Montenegro
- Date: 12 March 2003; 12:23 p.m. (UTC+01:00)
- Target: Zoran Đinđić
- Attack type: Sniper assassination
- Weapon: Heckler & Koch G3 rifle
- Deaths: Zoran Đinđić
- Injuries: Milan Veruović, bodyguard
- Perpetrator: Zvezdan Jovanović (incl. 11 accomplices under the orders of Milorad Ulemek with ties to Serbian Organized Crime)

Zoran Đinđić, the sixth Prime Minister of the Republic of Serbia, was assassinated on Wednesday 12 March 2003, in Belgrade, Serbia. Đinđić was fatally shot by a sniper while exiting his vehicle outside of the back entrance of the Serbian government headquarters. A state of emergency was immediately declared in the country, and during the police "Operation Sabre", more than 11,000 people associated with organized criminal groups were detained.

== Background ==
Đinđić previously escaped an assassination attempt in February 2003, in which a truck driven by Dejan Milenković (AKA Bagzi), a member of the Zemun Clan, an organized crime group, attempted to force the Prime Minister's car off the road in Novi Beograd. Đinđić escaped injury thanks to his security detail. Milenković was arrested, but released from custody after only a few days under unclear circumstances.

Đinđić had made many enemies domestically throughout his political career primarily because of his regard as being pro-Western and his hard-line policies on organized crime. Đinđić extradited Slobodan Milošević to the ICTY in 2001.

The assassination was organized and planned by Dušan Spasojević and Milorad Ulemek, also known as Legija. Ulemek was an ex-commander of the Special Operations Unit (JSO), which was founded by Slobodan Milošević's secret service (SDB) during the 1990s and was used during Milošević's rule for special operations in Croatia, Bosnia and Herzegovina and Kosovo, as well as for the elimination of Milošević's political opponents.

It was Ulemek who ordered Zvezdan Jovanović to carry out the assassination. Ulemek was connected to the powerful Zemun Clan of the Serbian mafia. The assassin, Zvezdan Jovanović, was born in 1965 in a village near the town of Peć, Yugoslavia. Jovanović was a lieutenant colonel in the JSO. Jovanović stated that he killed Đinđić to restore a pro-Milošević government.

== Assassination ==
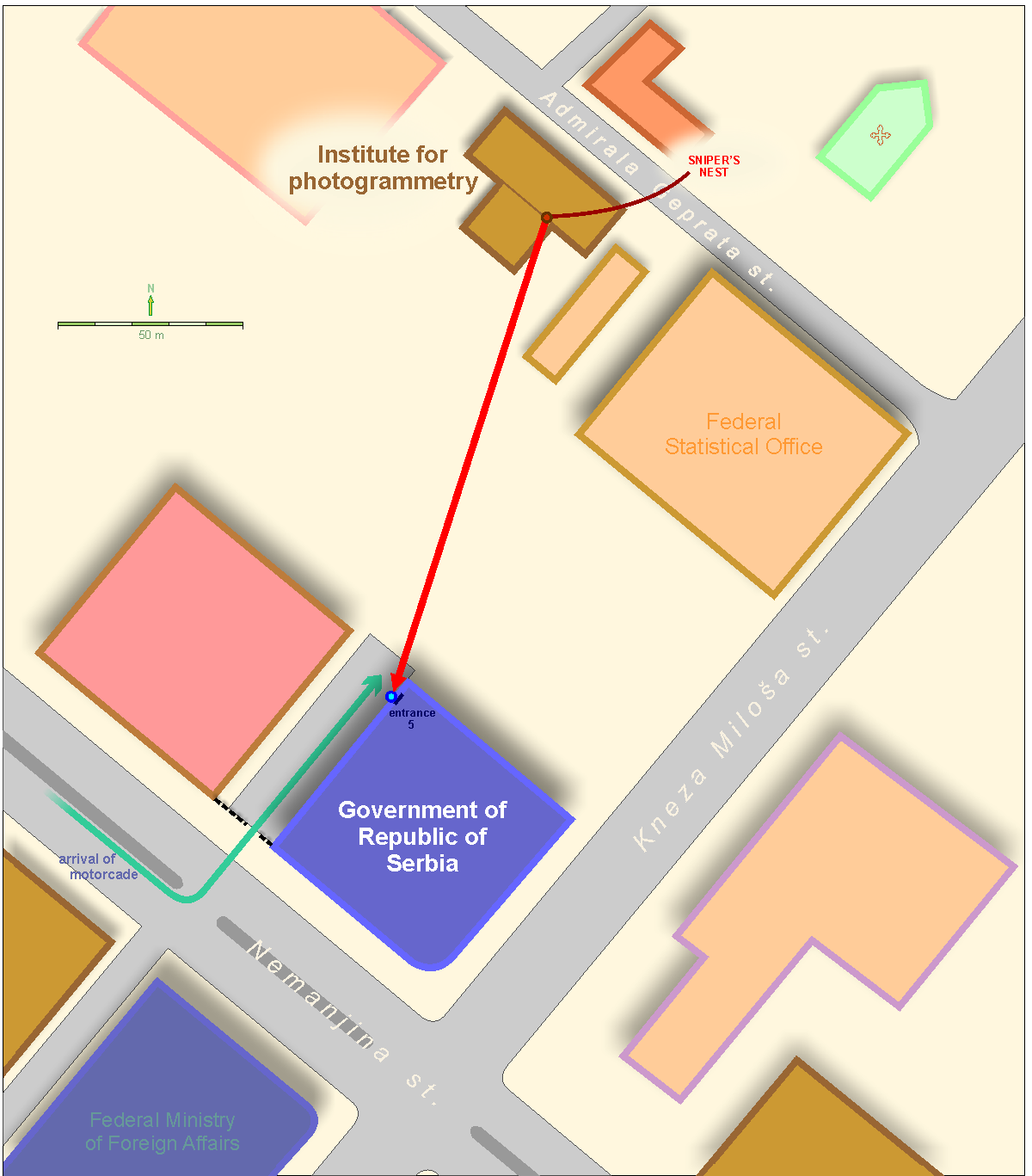
Position of Zoran Đinđić and the sniper at the moment of assassination.

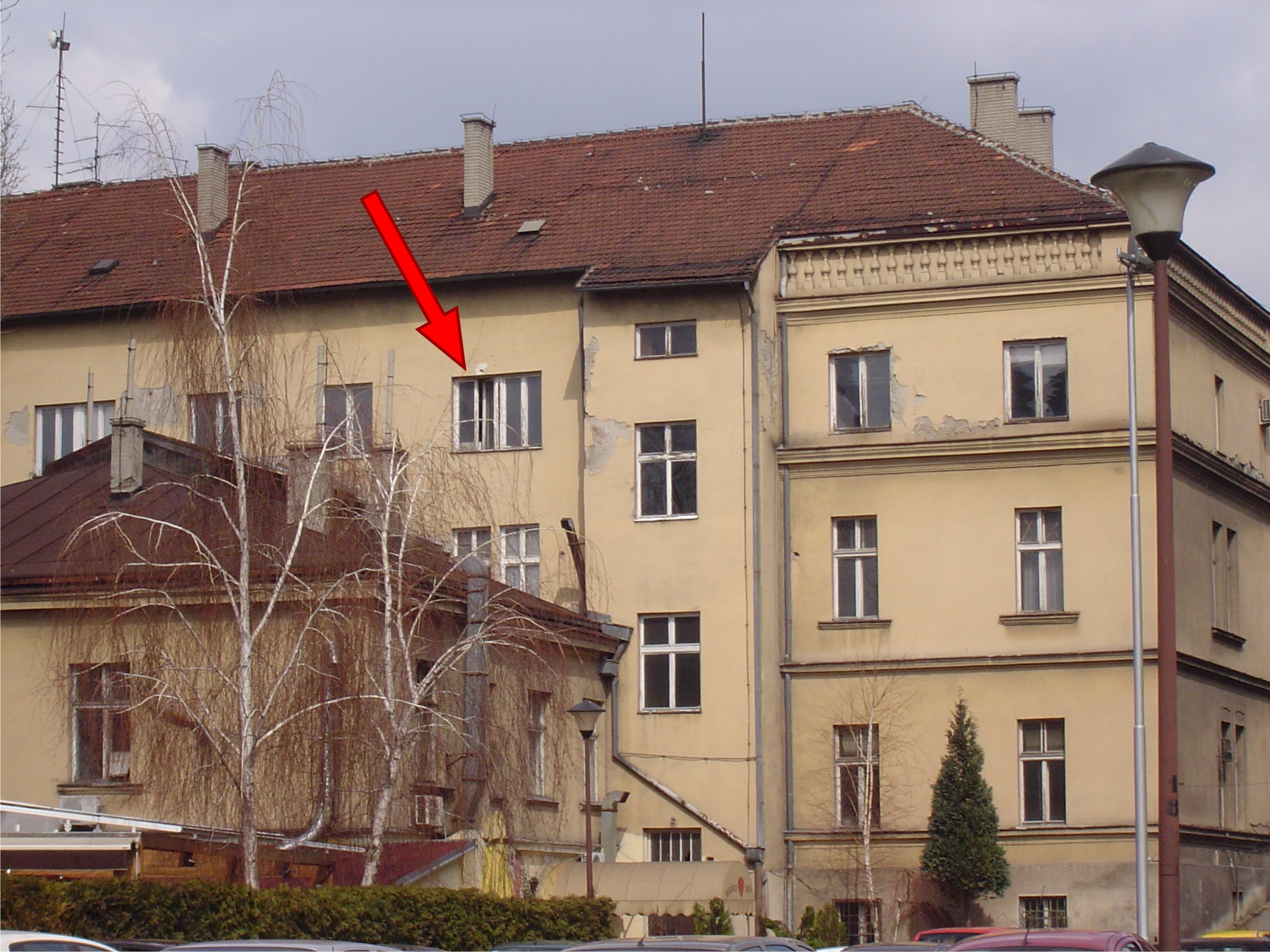
Institute for Photogrammetry from where Zvezdan Jovanović stood when he shot Đinđić.

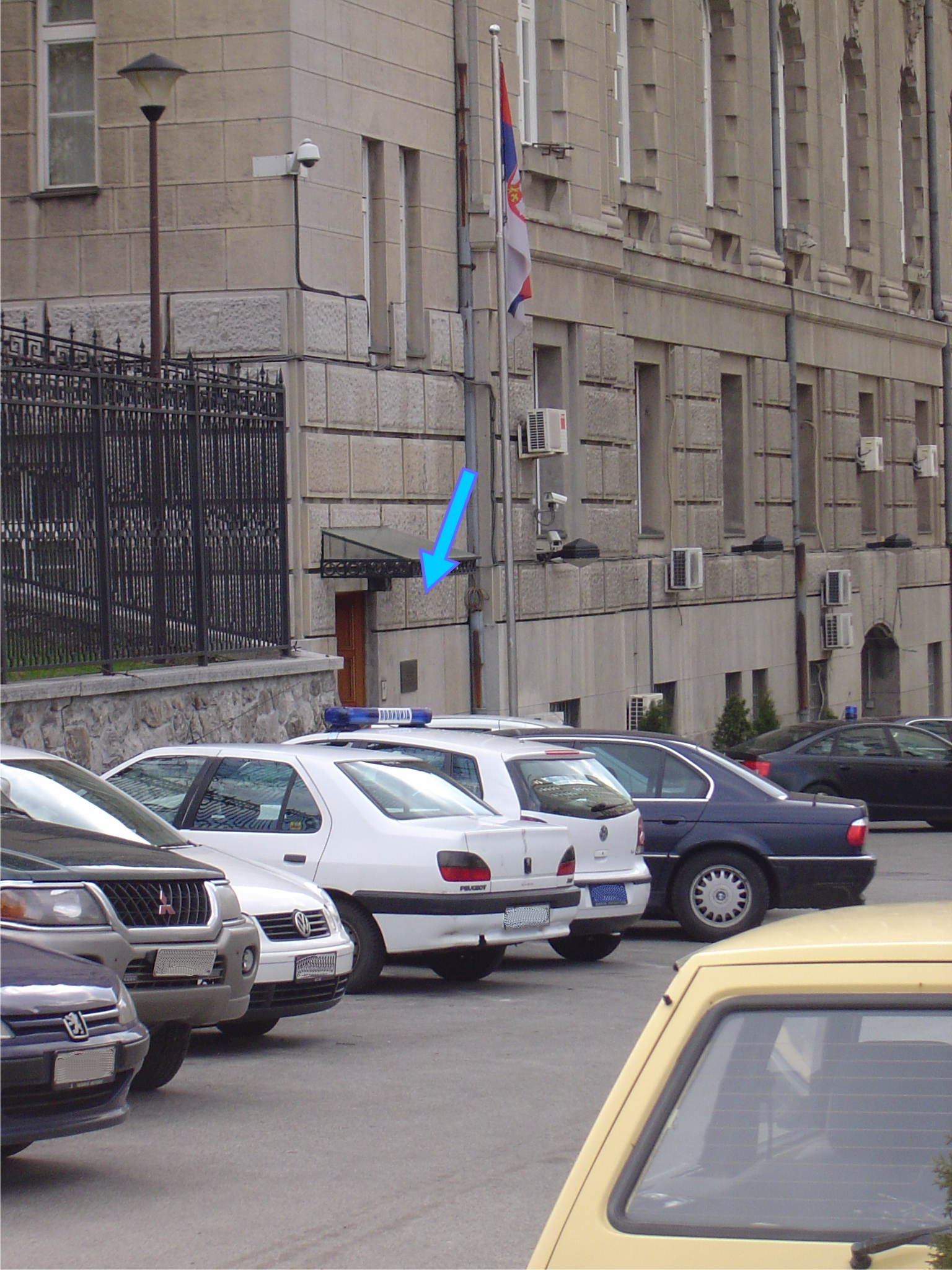
Back entrance to the Serbian government building where Đinđić was fatally shot.

At 12:25 Central European Time, Đinđić was fatally wounded by a gunshot while entering the Serbian government building where he was supposed to meet Foreign Minister of Sweden Anna Lindh, and her colleague Jan O. Karlsson (Lindh herself was assassinated just months later by a Serbian assassin). The shot penetrated his heart and killed him almost instantly. According to the official government statement, Đinđić was not conscious and did not have a pulse upon arriving at the emergency ward. His bodyguard, Milan Veruović, was also seriously wounded by the same bullet that killed the Prime minister, exiting the latter and hitting Veruović's stomach.

Jovanović fatally shot Đinđić from the window of a building approximately 180 meters away, using a 7.62mm Heckler & Koch G3 rifle.

== Arrests and trial ==
Zvezdan Jovanović was arrested in March 2003 and was charged with Đinđić's murder. He was silent during most of his trial but, allegedly, once he confessed to the murder of Đinđić, he said in a police report that he felt no remorse for killing him.

Dušan Spasojević and his associate Mile Luković, were killed by Serbian police officers during a raid on 27 March 2003. Aleksandar Simović, one of the co-conspirators, was arrested in Belgrade on 23 November 2006. The trial, which lasted over four years, was marked with great political pressure, life threats to the Chamber members and cooperative witnesses. Also, several witnesses were murdered during the trial.

On 23 May 2007, the Belgrade Special Court for Organised Crime found Simović and eleven other men – Milorad Ulemek, Zvezdan Jovanović, Dejan Milenković, Vladimir Milisavljević, Sretko Kalinić, Ninoslav Konstantinović, Milan Jurišić, Dušan Krsmanović, Željko Tojaga, Saša Pejaković and Branislav Bezarević – guilty for the premeditated murder of Zoran Đinđić. Ulemek and Jovanović were each handed sentences of 40 years in prison while the others were given sentences ranging from 8 to 35 years. Ulemek was part of a group of seven officers who had previously been convicted for the assassination of former Serbian President Ivan Stambolić and the attempted assassination of Vuk Drašković, having been given a sentence of 40 years in that case as well.

== Alternative and conspiracy theory ==
In September 2014, journalist Nikola Vrzić and Milan Veruović, personal bodyguard of Zoran Đinđić, who was also severely injured but survived, published a book The Third Bullet (Serbian: Treći metak). The name of the book comes from the claim that Đinđić was shot by the second sniper, unlike what the official version says. The authors claim that indictment (and later trial verdict) is based neither on the physical evidence, nor eyewitness testimonies, but constructed on unsustainable expertise and carefully built network of confessions and testimonies of cooperative witnesses.

In an attempt to discover the political background of the assassination, the authors returned to analyzing Đinđić's political activities over the period of several months before his death, indicating that Đinđić started to strive much more for the national interests of Serbia (e.g. resolving the status of Kosovo and Metohija, fearing that the western countries are under wraps working on its independence), seeking from his western partners to appreciate these national interests of Serbia, but was encountered with strong refusal.

The book, however, has been heavily criticized afterwards and was accused of following the anti-Đinđić mediatic campaign logic that existed during the term of the defunct Prime Minister. It has thus been labelled as nothing more than an unsubstantiated conspiracy theory.
