= Kijevo offensive =

- Part of the Kosovo War
Date	15 May – 3 July 1998 (1 month, 2 weeks and 4 days)
Location	Kijevo, FR Yugoslavia
Result	Yugoslav victory: KLA closes the road to Kijevo on 10 July

Belligerents
FR Yugoslavia	Kosovo Liberation Army

Commanders and leaders
(Federal Republic of Yugoslavia) Milorad Ulemek	unknown

Units involved
Yugoslav Army; Special Operations Unit	Unknown

Strength
2 Mi-24 Attack Helicopters; 150 Yugoslav police officers	Unknown

Casualties and losses
None	Unknown

The Kijevo offensive, also known as the siege of Kijevo, was a military operation during the Kosovo War conducted by Yugoslav forces and Special Operations Units led by Milorad Ulemek. The goal was to secure a connection to the highway. Various clashes occurred, and Yugoslav Troops succeeded in driving Kosovo Liberation Army (KLA) out of Kijevo and the surrounding areas.

== KLA attack on Kijevo ==
The KLA attacked the village of Kijevo somewhere between 15 and 17 May 1998 after seriously wounding a Serbian officer in the Village. This siege was important and one of the more decisive battles of the war. The village was a key access point to the highway which was 50 km from Priština, and was a stronghold for the KLA. Heavy fighting started when the KLA captured a few houses and fought the local police in the area. Fighting between Police and the KLA lasted for a long time. In early June, the Yugoslav Army was informed about the battle and joined in, conducting an offensive attack on the highway, which had been controlled by the KLA. Yugoslav forces successfully re-took the highway after more than 15 days of fighting and then called for the Special Operations Unit (JSO) as reinforcement to come and re-take Kijevo. In June, U.S. envoy Richard Holbrooke travelled to the region and attempted to persuade the KLA to end their siege, fearing a wider war would break out.

== Yugoslav Offensive on Kijevo ==
The JSO arrived with helicopters and machine guns, and began shooting and raiding KLA positions around the village. By this time, civilians had fled the village. In the ensuring firefight, the KLA lost a significant amount of area that could have been useful for their guerilla tactics. The militants withdrew from the area as the JSO cleared the village and reinstated Yugoslav control over it.
