= Operation Sabre (Serbia) =

Serbian police operation

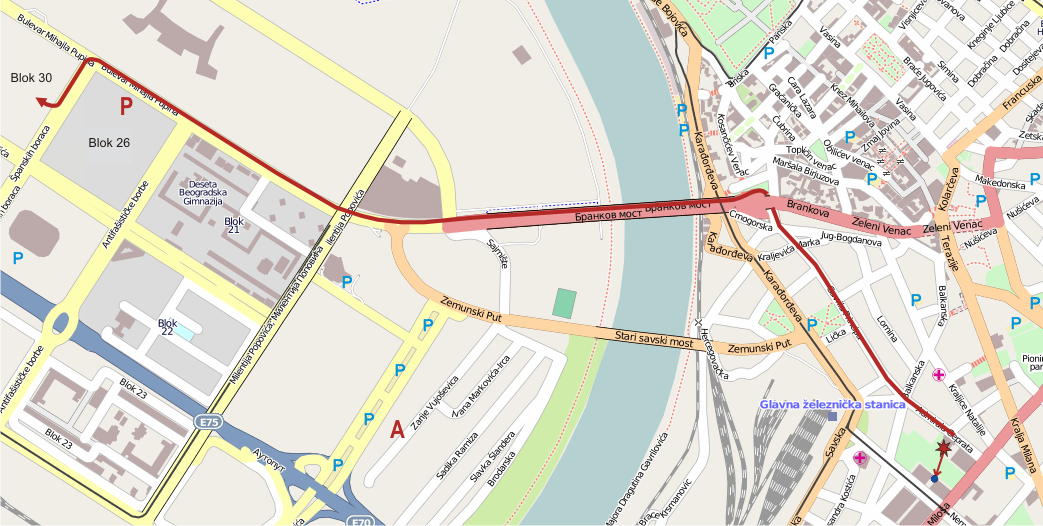
- The escape route of assassin after the assassination of Đinđić
- Date: 12 March – 22 April 2003
- Location: Serbia, Serbia and Montenegro
- Caused by: Assassination of Zoran Đinđić; Assassination of Ivan Stambolić; Organized crime in Serbia
- Result: Abolition of the Special Operations Unit; Formation of a technical government; 2003 early parliamentary elections

Parties
| (Republic of Serbia (1992–2006)) Government of Serbia; Police of Serbia | Special Operations Unit; Zemun clan |

Lead figures
| Zoran Živković; Nataša Mićić; Čedomir Jovanović; Vladan Batić | Milorad Ulemek; Franko Simatović; Dušan Spasojević †; Zvezdan Jovanović |

Casualties and losses
| 7 wounded | 2 killed, 11 wounded 11,000+ arrests 300+ convicted |

Operation Sabre (Serbian: Операција Сабља, romanized: Operacija Sablja) was a Serbian police operation in 2003 to find and arrest those responsible for the assassination of Serbian Prime Minister Zoran Đinđić, as well as other persons who were suspected to have connections to organized crime groups.

== Background ==
Immediately after the assassination of Đinđić, a state of emergency was declared by interim president, Nataša Mićić, giving the government and police extraordinary powers in the pursuit of the assassins. The state of emergency lasted from the day of the assassination, 12 March 2003, until 22 April 2003.

== Action ==
The primary goal of the action in Operation Sabre was to find the assassins of Đinđić, but the investigation expanded to other persons who were suspected to have connections to organized crime groups. In the course of Operation Sabre, the police claimed to solve several other high-profile crimes which had been unresolved for years, including the assassination of former Serbian President, Ivan Stambolić.

The members of several organised crime groups were eliminated in the course of Operation Sabre, including the Zemun clan, some of whom were former members of an elite police unit, the Special Operations Unit. Milan Sarajlić, the Deputy State Prosecutor of Serbia, was arrested and confessed to being on the payroll of the Zemun clan.

== Criticism ==
11,665 people were detained in connection with suspected links to organized crime. Among them were many public figures and entertainers. According to Gow, "The state of emergency period in general, and Operation 'Sabre' in particular, remain controversial in some political circles, and concerns were raised that the Government and the police used the situation to deal with political opponents." Some political opponents accused the government of human rights abuse during the operation but the government and proponents of the action pointed out that the Serbia and Montenegro became a member of the Council of Europe during the action and that the majority of the organizations sent to analyze the situation during the operation including the Organization for Security and Co-operation in Europe declared that the operation was performed without breaches of human rights. Some organisations disagree, notably Human Rights Watch, which was critical of detention in isolation and interrogation without a lawyer being present, and Amnesty International, which alleged ill-treatment and torture.

== In popular culture ==
Operation Sabre is the primary subject of the Serbian miniseries Sablja (Sabre) that aired on RTS in 2024. It follows fictional members of the police, media and organized crime groups.
