= Kijevë =

Village in Malisheva, Kosovo

Kijevë Kijevo
- Location within Kosovo
- Coordinates: 42.5663631°N 20.7169292°E
- Country: Kosovo
- District: Prizren
- Municipality: Malisheva

Population (2024)
  - Total: 1,084

Kijevë (Albanian: Kijevë, Serbian: Кијево, romanized: Kijevo) is a village located in the Malisheva municipality in Kosovo.

== History ==
Kijevë was the site of armed clashes in 1998 between Yugoslav forces and the Kosovo Liberation Army during the Kosovo War.

== Demography ==
In 1928, Kijevo, as a rural municipality, had 369 households and 2,961 inhabitants. It belonged in 1928 to the Podrimlje District and the Kosovo Region.

As of 2024, Kijevë had 1,084 inhabitants, of whom 1,065 (98.24%) were Albanian.
