= Shqiptar =

Albanian endonym

Shqiptar (Albanian definite form: Shqip(ë)tari; Gheg Albanian: Shqyptar/-i; plural: Shqiptarë/-t, Shqyptarë/-t) is an Albanian ethnonym (endonym), by which Albanians call themselves. They call their country Shqipëria (Gheg Albanian: Shqypnia, Shqipnia). It has gradually replaced the Old Albanian endonym Arbënesh/Arbëresh after the Middle Ages in the western Balkans.

== Etymology ==
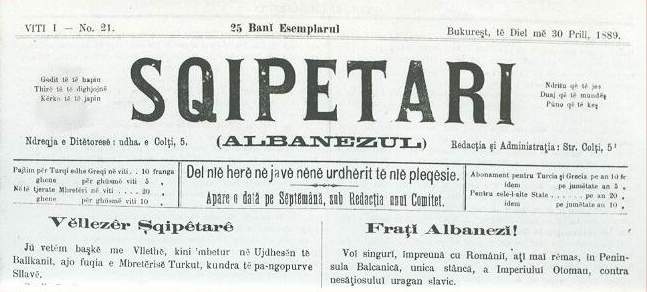
The newspaper Sqipetari, published by the Albanian community of Romania (1889)

The first documentation of the adverb/adjective shqip can already be found in the Meshari, the oldest Albanian language book published in 1555 by Gjon Buzuku. Johann Georg von Hahn (1854) was the first to derive the term Shqiptar from the Albanian verbs shqipoj ("to speak clearly") and shqiptoj ("to speak out, pronounce"), while Gustav Meyer (1891) was the first to derive shqipoj from the Latin verb excipere, denoting people who speak the same language, similar to the ethno-linguistic dichotomies Sloven—Nemac and Deutsch—Wälsch. This etymology is widely accepted by modern Albanologists. Demetrio Camarda (1864), on the other hand, was the first to derive Shqiptar from the Albanian noun shqipe or shqiponjë (eagle). This theory, now considered a folk etymology, is based mainly on the symbolic meaning of the eagle for the Albanian people, as it is their national bird, a totem associated with freedom and heroism in Albanian folklore. It has been used as a national symbol since their earliest records, and was a common heraldic symbol for many Albanian dynasties in the Late Middle Ages; an example is the flag of Skanderbeg, whose family symbol was the black double-headed eagle, which is displayed on the Albanian flag.

== History ==
During the Middle Ages, the Albanians called their country Arbëria (Gheg: Arbënia) and referred to themselves as Arbëresh (Gheg: Arbënesh) while known through derivative terms by neighbouring peoples as Arbanasi, Arbanenses / Albaneses, Arvanites (Arbanites), Arnaut, Arbineş and so on. The words Shqipëri and Shqiptar are attested from 14th century onward, but it was only at the end of 17th and beginning of the early 18th centuries that the placename Shqipëria and the ethnic demonym Shqiptarë gradually replaced Arbëria and Arbëreshë amongst Albanian speakers. This was due to socio-political, cultural, economic and religious complexities that Albanians experienced during the Ottoman era. The usage of the old endonym Arbënesh/Arbëresh, however, persisted and was retained by Albanian communities which had migrated from Albania and adjacent areas centuries before the change of the self-designation, namely the Arbëreshë of Italy, the Arvanites of Greece as well as Arbanasi in Croatia. As such, the medieval migrants to Greece and later migrants to Italy during the 15th-century are not aware of the term Shqiptar.

== Non-Albanian usage ==
=== Use in Western Europe ===
Skipetar/s is a historical rendering or exonym of the term Shqiptar by some Western European authors in use from the late 18th century to the early 20th century.

=== Use in South Slavic languages ===
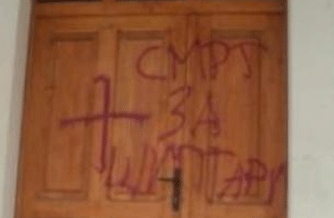
Graffiti in the Republic of Macedonia reading "Death for Shiptars" (Macedonian: Смрт за Шиптари, romanized: Smrt za Šiptari)

The term Shiptar (Serbo-Croatian Latin and Slovene: Šiptar; Serbo-Croatian Cyrillic and Macedonian: Шиптар) used in Serbo-Croatian, Slovene and Macedonian is South Slavic variant format of name, later became an ethnic slur, and it is also considered derogatory by Albanians when used by South Slavic peoples, due to its negative connotations.

After 1945, in pursuit of a policy of national equality, the Communist Party of Yugoslavia designated the Albanian community as Shiptars, however with increasing autonomy during the 1960s for Kosovo Albanians, their leadership requested, and attained in 1974, the term Albanians be officially used stressing a national over an only ethnic, self-identification.

These developments resulted in the word Šiptar in Serbian usage acquiring pejorative connotations that implied racism towards Albanians. It continued to be used by some Yugoslav and Serb politicians to relegate the status of Albanians to simply one of the minority ethnic groups.

The official (and often neutral) terms for Albanians in South Slavic languages are Albanac (in Serbo-Croatian Latin), Албанац (in Serbo-Croatian Cyrillic), Albanec (in Slovene) and Албанец (in Macedonian).

Dušan Spasojević, a Serbian gangster, was nicknamed "Šiptar". In 2018, the Supreme Court in Belgrade defined the word as racist and discriminatory against Albanians. In 2019, the Serbian Defense Minister, Aleksandar Vulin, sparked controversy by using the pejorative for Albanians.

During a game between Austria and North Macedonia at the UEFA Euro 2020, immediately after scoring a goal, Austrian forward Marko Arnautović—who is of paternal Serb descent—shouted to Macedonian players Ezgjan Alioski and Egzon Bejtulai—both Macedonian Albanians—"Jeb'o sam ti majku šiptarsku" (Serbian for 'I fucked your Shiptar mother'). He was punished with suspension for the next game against Netherlands.

== See also ==
- Names of the Albanians and Albania
- Albania (placename)

== Sources ==
=== Bibliography ===
- Bartl, Peter (2001) [1995]. Albanci: od srednjeg veka do danas (in Serbian). Translated by Milenković, Ljubinka. Belgrade: Clio. ISBN 9788671020176. OCLC 51036121.
- Cole, Jeffrey E. (2011). Ethnic Groups of Europe: An Encyclopedia. ABC-CLIO. ISBN 978-1598843026.
- Demiraj, Bardhyl (2010). "Shqiptar–The generalization of this ethnic name in the XVIII century". In Demiraj, Bardhyl (ed.). Wir sind die Deinen: Studien zur albanischen Sprache, Literatur und Kulturgeschichte, dem Gedenken an Martin Camaj (1925-1992) gewidmet. Otto Harrassowitz Verlag. pp. 533–565. ISBN 9783447062213.
- Elsie, Robert (2001). A Dictionary of Albanian Religion, Mythology and Folk Culture. London: Hurst & Company. ISBN 1-85065-570-7.
- Elsie, Robert (2010), Historical Dictionary of Albania, Historical Dictionaries of Europe, vol. 75 (2 ed.), Scarecrow Press, ISBN 978-0810861886
- Everett-Heath, John (2017). The Concise Dictionary of World Place Names. Oxford University Press. ISBN 9780192556462.
- Guzina, Dejan (2003). "Kosovo or Kosova – Could it be both? The Case of Interlocking Serbian and Albanian Nationalisms". In Bieber, Florian; Daskalovski, Židas (eds.). Understanding the war in Kosovo. London: Psychology Press. pp. 30–52. ISBN 9780714653914.
- Hodgkison, Harry (2005). Scanderbeg: From Ottoman Captive to Albanian Hero. Bloomsbury Academic. ISBN 1-85043-941-9.
- Rusakov, Alexander (2017). "Albanian". In Mate Kapović (ed.). The Indo-European Languages (2nd ed.). Routledge. ISBN 978-1-315-67855-9.
- Lloshi, Xhevat (1999). "Albanian". In Hinrichs, Uwe; Uwe Büttner (eds.). Handbuch der Südosteuropa-Linguistik. Otto Harrassowitz Verlag.
- Malcolm, Noel (1998). Kosovo: A Short History. ISBN 978-0-3304-1224-7.
- Matasović, Ranko (2019). A Grammatical Sketch of Albanian for Students of Indo European (PDF). Zagreb: [self-published].
- Matzinger, Joachim (2013). "Shqip bei den altalbanischen Autoren vom 16. bis zum frühen 18. Jahrhundert [Shqip within Old Albanian authors from the 16th to the early 18th century]". Zeitschrift für Balkanologie. pp. 103–122.
- Mirdita, Zef (1969). "Iliri i etnogeneza Albanaca". Iz istorije Albanaca. Zbornik predavanja. Priručnik za nastavnike. Beograd: Zavod za izdavanje udžbenika Socijalističke Republike Srbije.
- Mojzes, Paul (2011). Balkan Genocides: Holocaust and Ethnic Cleansing in the Twentieth Century. Rowman & Littlefield. ISBN 978-1-4422-0663-2.
- Neofotistos, Vasiliki P. (2010a). "Cultural Intimacy and Subversive Disorder: The Politics of Romance in the Republic of Macedonia". Anthropological Quarterly. 83 (2).
- Neofotistos, Vasiliki P. (2010b). "Postsocialism, Social Value, and Identity Politics among Albanians in Macedonia". Slavic Review. 69 (4): 882–902. doi:10.1017/S003767790000989X. S2CID 165104213.
- Orel, Vladimir (1998). Albanian etymological dictionary. Brill. ISBN 978-90-04-11024-3.
- Skutsch, C. (2013). Encyclopedia of the World's Minorities. Taylor & Francis. ISBN 9781135193881.
- Wilmer, Franke (2014). The Social Construction of Man, the State and War: Identity, Conflict, and Violence in Former Yugoslavia. Routledge. ISBN 978-1-135-95621-9.
