= Dušan Spasojević =

Head of Serbian criminal group (1968–2003)

- Душан Спасојевић
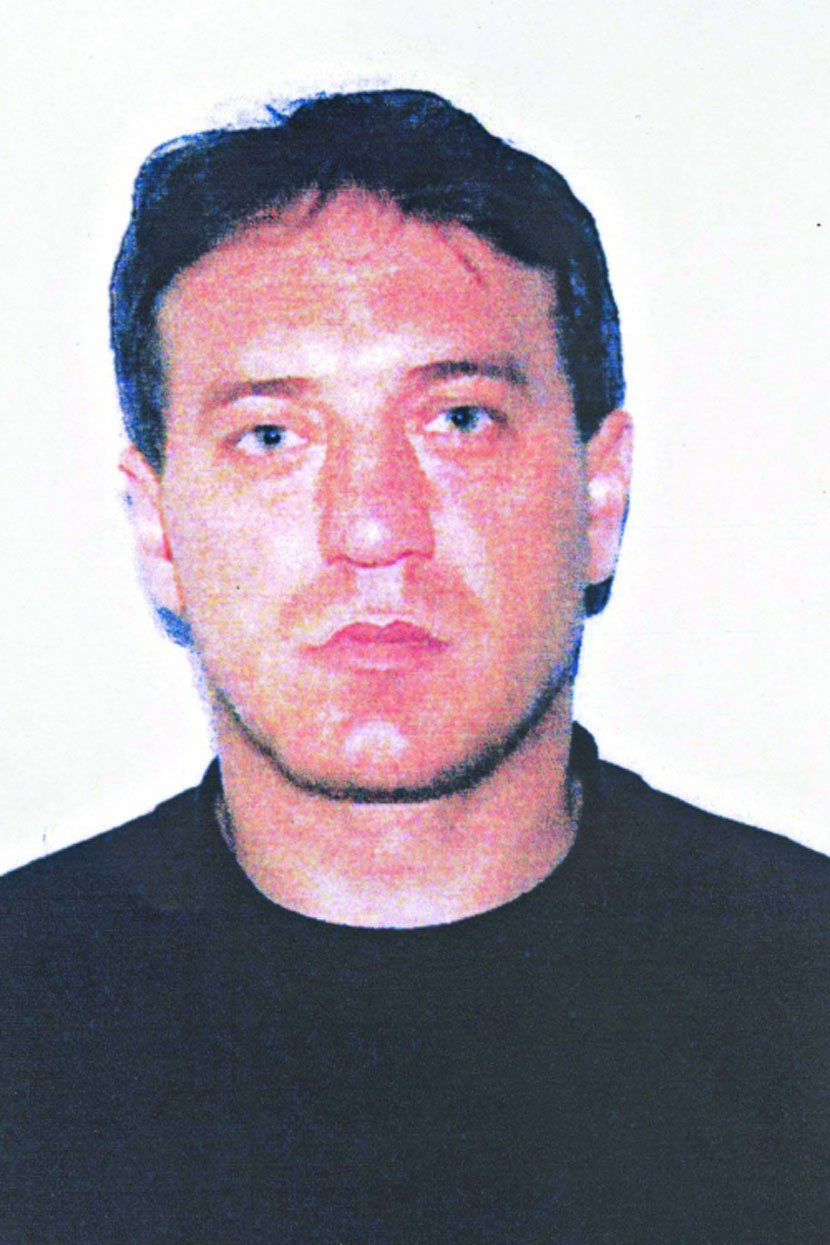
- Born: 10 July 1968; Retkocer, Medveđa, SR Serbia, SFR Yugoslavia
- Died: 27 March 2003 (aged 34); Belgrade, Serbia, Serbia and Montenegro
- Occupation: Criminal
- Spouse: Tatjana Spasojević
- Children: 2 (Jovana legitimate)
- Relatives: Milovan Spasojević; Stanka Spasojević

Dušan Spasojević (Serbian Cyrillic: Душан Спасојевић; 10 July 1968 – 27 March 2003), known by the nicknames Duća and Šiptar (a derogatory term for Albanians), was a Serbian criminal who was the head of one of the largest Serbian criminal groups on record, the Zemun Clan.

The peak of Zemun Clan's influence occurred from 2000 until 2003 when a country-wide manhunt, named Operation Sabre, was initiated after the assassination of Serbian Prime Minister Zoran Đinđić, leading to more than 11,000 people associated with organized criminal groups being detained.

Serbian police surrounded Spasojević and his accomplice, Mile Luković. After a shootout between the two sides, Spasojević and Luković were killed by police, according to the official version, in front of their hiding place by a sniper in the village of Meljak near Belgrade on 27 March 2003.
