= Zemun Clan =

Mafia clan in Zemun, Belgrade, Serbia

- Founded by: Dušan Spasojević (a.k.a. Šiptar)
- Founding location: Zemun, Belgrade, Serbia and Montenegro
- Territory: Zemun
- Membership (est.): 20 members 100 foot-soldiers
- Criminal activities: Arms trafficking, bribery, burglary, drug trafficking, embezzlement, extortion, fraud, Kidnapping, money laundering, murder, Racketeering, robbery and theft

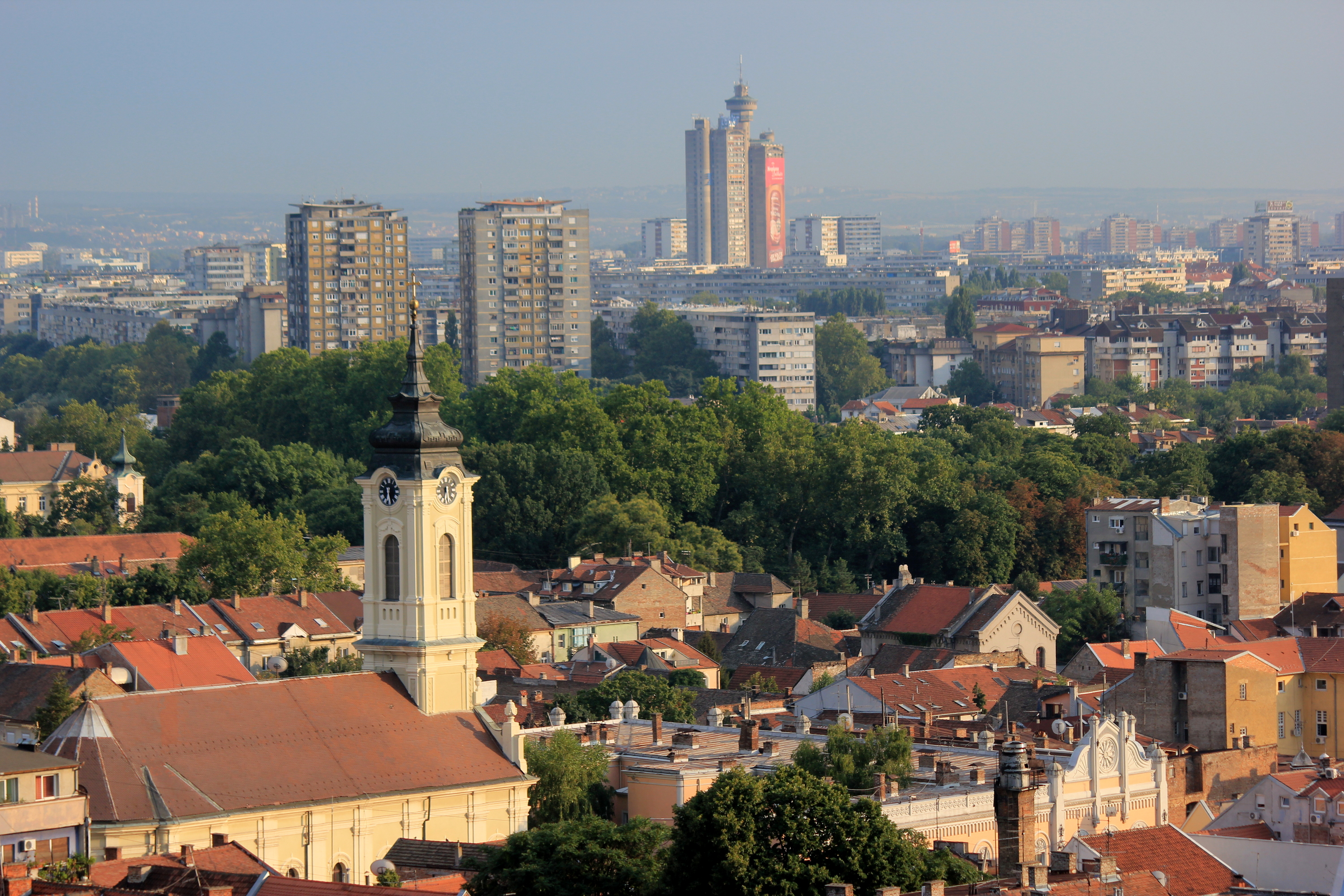
View of Zemun, Belgrade, Serbia

The Zemun Clan (Serbian: Земунски клан, romanized: Zemunski klan) is one of the Belgrade clans of the Serbian mafia. It is named for the gang's base in Zemun, a municipality of Belgrade. The peak of the clan's power and influence occurred between 1999 and 2003 and they were considered to be one of the most powerful organisations in Southeast Europe.

== History ==
In 1993, Dušan Spasojević, a former lower-league association football player who would later become the head of the Zemun clan, arrived in the Serbian capital city of Belgrade from his home village of Retkocer, near Medveđa in southern Serbia. Retkocer's proximity to Kosovo is what earned Spasojević the nickname Šiptar (the Albanian), even though he was an ethnic Serb. On his trip to Belgrade, he was accompanied by his childhood friend and future associate, Mile Luković, called Kum (the Godfather). Luković came from Donji Gajtan near Medveđa, and has previously worked as a prison guard in Pristina. Upon arriving in Belgrade, the two men soon got involved in car theft.

In 1995, Belgrade police arrested Spasojević and Luković while they were trying to steal a civilian car parked in front of a military hospital. The car theft operation was led by a certain "Peca", and targets were people coming to visit wounded friends or relatives in the hospital. Due to the ongoing Yugoslav Wars, the number of such visits was large. Presumably, the group operated either under the control, or in cooperation with, the Surčin clan, the largest organised car theft group in the country. In 1997, Spasojević and Luković moved from cars to pushing drugs in the Belgrade suburb of Karaburma, and after getting arrested again, they became police informants. After finding out that his son is a drug dealer, Luković's father committed suicide.

Spasojević and Luković soon became close to the leader of the Surčin clan, Ljubiša Buha. The two men used Buha's numerous connections to their advantage and established their base of operations in Zemun neighborhood, relatively close to Surčin. Nominally, Spasojević and Luković were considered members of the Surčin group, but later became increasingly autonomous in their operations. During this period, Sretko "The Beast" Kalinić joined Spasojević's group as their chief hit-man. His methods included drive-by shootings from a grey Audi (dubbed the "Audi of Death" by the media) and, in at least one case, grinding the victim in a meat grinder. The group definitely parted ways with Buha after he decided to turn legitimate and start a road construction company, called Defense Road.

The Zemun clan grew in prominence after the downfall of Slobodan Milošević with an influx of many veterans of the Special Operations Unit (widely known as Red Berets), including the unit's commander, Milorad Ulemek. These were people who had military training, wartime experience and connections with elements of the Serbian state secret service UDBA (after 2001, renamed to BIA). In September 2001, 700 kilos of heroin were found in a bank vault rented by Beobanka to the Security Information Agency (BIA) in central Belgrade. The illegal safekeeping was never explained nor brought up. In 2001, the Zemun clan organized "special training courses" with the BIA, lending them information on Kosovar Albanian insurgents in exchange.

During 2001, the clan kidnapped several influential businessmen and demanded millions as ransom. Among those men were Milija Babović and Miroslav Mišković, widely considered to be the most powerful business people in Serbia at the time. In both cases, Ulemek offered his help to the police, in his official capacity. He abused that position and provided insider information to the clan: for example, when he found out that Babović's family quickly and easily collected the ransom money, he advised the clan members to demand more. Eventually, all the hostages were released, however, some were severely beaten and tortured in the process. Alerted by the increasingly brazen kidnappings, the Minister of Internal Affairs, Dušan Mihajlović ordered the formation of an undercover unit within the police, led by experienced officer Mile Novaković, with the sole task of bringing down the perpetrators.

During their trip to Paris, Spasojević and Luković had been arrested by the French police on the account of having fake passports. They were extradited to Serbia and spent several months in custody, but were ultimately released, despite protests by several high ranking police officers.

The Clan formed the so-called "crowbar brigade" ("pajser brigada"), consisting of around 50 underage or young delinquents from different areas of Belgrade, whose primary job was to harass, extort and torture the drug addicts who owed the Clan money. Although crowbar was their primary weapon, they used all sorts of blunt weapons. The "brigade" was controlled by Spasojević's associates, Dušan Krsmanović and Milan Jurišić.

Spasojević had built a villa with an adjacent shopping mall in Šilerova street, a relatively poor neighborhood within Zemun. Built for around 8,5 million German Marks, it was surrounded by 7m high walls, contained an Olympic swimming pool with ocean rubble, and chairs covered with pony hair. The villa also had a torture chamber in the basement, however the clan usually avoided keeping the hostages there.

In 2002, the clan attempted to assassinate Buha twice: once in front of his company Defense Road in Belgrade, and again during his vacation in Istanbul. The last attempt prompted Buha to drive all the way to the Serbian embassy in Ankara and offer to testify. He was transferred to a secure location where gave his testimony in the presence of the Serbian state prosecutor and the police unit led by Novaković.

During the period that started with the Yugoslav Wars and ended with the assassination of Prime Minister Zoran Đinđić in March 2003, connections between the Serbian Mafia and the government were obvious and corruption was rampant in most branches of the state, from border patrols to law-enforcement agencies.

On 12 March 2003, Đinđić was assassinated by former Special Operations Unit member Zvezdan Jovanović. The government then set in motion a major operation against organized crime codenamed Operation Sabre, which led to more than 10,000 arrests. The revenue of New Belgrade malls, locations frequented by gangsters, plummeted by more than 20+% after the Operation. Milan Sarajlić, the Deputy State Prosecutor of Serbia, was arrested and confessed to being on the payroll of the Zemun clan. The Red Berets were dissolved on 23 March 2003. Spasojević and Luković were killed by the police in front of their hiding place in the village of Meljak near Belgrade, on 27 March. The official explanation has been that both were killed in a shootout with the police, but this has been disputed by many, including the famous Serbian lawyer Toma Fila. The villa in Šilerova street was demolished.

In 2006, it was revealed that Spasojević was a source of information to Serbian Radical leader Vojislav Šešelj, whom he had given information about high-profile murders carried out in Serbia, written about in Šešelj's two books (Šešelj referred to Spasojević under the pseudonym Laufer).

== The "new" Zemun Clan ==
After a period of relative silence, the organized groups from Zemun and surrounding areas once again increased their activities. In November 2009, Argentine Police arrested 5 Serbian drug couriers and seized their 492 kilograms of cocaine in Buenos Aires. On 31 October 2009, Serbian police arrested over 500 people in the biggest ever anti-drug operation carried out in Serbia. The routes of the drugs were from Uruguay and Argentina to South Africa to Northern Italy, Turkey and Montenegro.

Serbian organized crime experts estimated that 10,000 foot soldiers form a part of the 5 major organized crime groups operating in the country. A courier package of 5 kilos of cocaine was intercepted from Paraguay and 4 Belgraders were arrested. The busts were part of Operation Balkan Warrior; an international drug smuggling case that involves mainly the new Zemun Clan. The leader of the new drug ring is Željko Vujanović.

== Notable people ==
Name Alias	Born/died	Title	Info
Mafiosi
Dušan Spasojević "Duća, Šiptar (Shqiptare)"	1968–2003	Head	Head of the Zemun Clan. Spasojević was killed by Serbian police on 27 March 2003 during a country-wide manhunt initiated after the assassination of Serbian Prime Minister Zoran Đinđić.
Mile Luković "Kum (Godfather)"	1969–2003	Head	One of the heads of the Zemun Clan and a co-conspirator in the assassination of Zoran Đinđić. Killed along with Dušan Spasojević by Serbian police on 27 March 2003.
Milorad Ulemek " Milorad Luković, Meker, Legija (Legion)"	1968–	Boss	Arkan's Tigers member during the Yugoslav Wars, transferred into the Red Berets by Slobodan Milošević. Currently serving a 40-year prison sentence for his involvement in Đinđić's assassination. Sentenced to 2 more 40 years sentences, for the murder of Ivan Stambolić and the attempted murder of Vuk Drašković.
Zvezdan Jovanović "Zveki, Zmija (Snake)"	1965–	Hitman	A former member of the Serbian Volunteer Guard led by Željko Ražnatović Arkan, and later a Red Berets member serving under the command of Milorad Ulemek. Assassinated Serbian Prime Minister Zoran Đinđić in 2003, for which he is currently serving a 40-year prison sentence.
Vladimir Milisavljević "Budala (Fool)"	1977–	Hitman	Often described as one of the key members of the clan. He earned his nickname because he is known as the only clan member with a higher education degree. He managed to avoid arrest in the immediate aftermath of Đinđić's assassination. Sentenced in absentia to 35 year in prison for his involvement in the assassination. Arrested on 9 February 2012 in Valencia, Spain. In November 2015 he was convicted on 22 years in Zuera prison for illegal possession of weapons and concealment of murder of Milan Jurišić.
Sretko Kalinić "Zver (Beast), Beli (White)"	1974–	Hitman	Clan's hitman who was known for his cruelty. He managed to avoid arrest in the immediate aftermath of Đinđić's assassination. He is indicted for numerous assassinations of clan opponents and victims. Arrested in June 2010 in Zagreb, Croatia after surviving a murder attempt by Miloš Simović. Currently serving his 30-year sentence for his involvement in Đinđić's assassination, while being trialed for several other serious crimes in the Special Court for Organized Crime in Belgrade. On 7 February 2010, he attempted an unsuccessful escape with Željko Milovanović from the prison unit of the Special Court in Belgrade.
Dejan Milenković "Bagzi"	1970–		Managed to avoid arrest in the immediate aftermath of Đinđić's murder. Arrested in July 2004 in Thessaloniki, Greece. He decided to cooperate with Serbian authorities and managed to obtain the status of a protected witness in exchange for giving incriminating evidence against other Zemun Clan members.
Aleksandar Simović	1976–		Brother of Miloš Simović. Currently serving a 35-year prison sentence for his involvement in Đinđić's murder.
Ninoslav Konstantinović "Nino"	1978–2003		Managed to avoid arrest in the immediate aftermath of Đinđić's murder and was sentenced in absentia to 35 years in prison for his involvement in the assassination. Allegedly killed by Miloš Simović.
Miloš Simović	1979–		One of the younger clan members. He served as a messenger between Dušan Spasojević, Mile Luković and Milorad Ulemek. He managed to avoid arrest in the immediate aftermath of Đinđić's murder but was sentenced in absentia to 30 years in prison for his involvement in the assassination. Arrested on 10 July 2010 while trying to cross the border between Serbia and Croatia, after he unsuccessfully tried to kill Sretko Kalinić days earlier in Zagreb, Croatia.
Milan Jurišić "Jure"	1974–2009		Managed to avoid arrest in the immediate aftermath of Đinđić's murder. Sentenced in absentia to 30-year prison sentence for his involvement in this assassination. Killed in Spain by Miloš Simović.
Željko Milovanović	1966–		Another former Red Berets member. He was not involved directly in the murder of Đinđić, however, he was wanted by Serbian authorities for a series of gunpoint bank robberies. He was arrested several times and several times he managed to escape from various institutions in Serbia. He was arrested on 31 May 2009 in Belgrade for the murder of Croatian newspaper tycoon Ivo Pukanić. The trial was held in Serbia as at the time Serbia and Croatia did not have a bilateral extradition agreement. On 7 February, he attempted an unsuccessful escape, with Sretko Kalinić from the prison unit of the Special Court in Belgrade.
Luka Bojović "Pekar (Baker)"	1973–	Boss	Originally one of the less prominent clan members. He took over the Clan's business after the demise of the original clan leadership in the aftermath of the assassination of Zoran Đinđić. According to Serbian authorities, he organized at least 11 murders of Clan opponents. Arrested on 9 February 2012 in Valencia, Spain. In November 2015 he was convicted on 18 years in Zuera prison for illegal possession of weapons.
Siniša Petrić "Zenica"	1974–	Hitman	A former member of the notorious gang of Marinko Magda. Also a former member of the Serbian Volunteer Guard. He was allegedly expelled for lack of discipline by Željko Ražnatović. In the mid-90s he was sentenced to death according to the Serbian criminal law that was valid at that time, for a series of murders in north Serbia and south Hungary. He was awaiting the execution of his sentence in prison near Istok in Kosovo in 1999 when the Kosovo War broke out. He disappeared from prison under mysterious circumstances. Arrested on 9 February 2012 in Valencia, Spain. Currently awaiting extradition to Serbian authorities.

== In popular culture ==
- Serbian crime TV series "Klan" is a satire of the Zemun Clan, with the names changed and the plot taking place in the 2020s.
