= Special Operations Unit (Serbia) =

Special forces police unit (1991–2003)

Unit for Special Operations
- Јединица за специјалне операције Jedinica za specijalne operacije
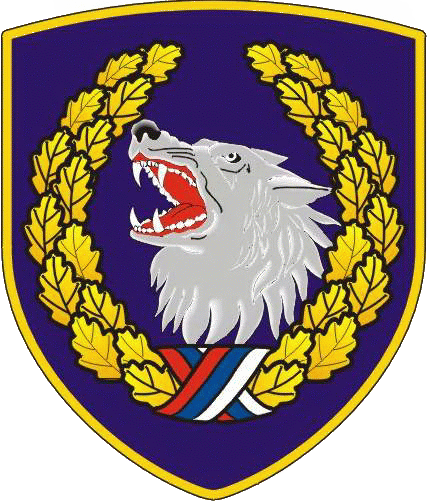
- Emblem of Special Operations Unit
- Active: 1991 – March 25, 2003 (de jure from 1996)
- Country: Federal Republic of Yugoslavia
- Agency: State Security Directorate (1996–2001)
- Type: Paramilitary police unit
- Operations jurisdiction: National
- Headquarters: Kula
- Common name: Red Berets, Frankies
- Abbreviation: JSO

Structure
- Employees: 200 (+600 in reserves)

Commanders
- Notable commanders: Franko Simatović (1991–1998); Milorad Ulemek (1998–2001); Dušan Maričić (2001–2003)

Notables
- Significant operation(s): Croatian War of Independence; Battle of Vukovar; Bosnian War; Operation Spider; Capture of Vrnograč; Operation Sana; Kosovo War; Attacks on Likoshane and Çirez; Attack on Prekaz; Battle of Glođane; Kijevo offensive; Dečani operation; Battle of Lođa; Battle of Junik; Central Drenica offensive; Yugoslav September offensive; Račak massacre; Insurgency in the Preševo Valley; Special Operations Unit mutiny; Operation Sabre

The Unit for Special Operations (Serbian: Јединица за специјалне операције, Jedinica za specijalne operacije; abbr. ЈСО or JSO) or the Special Operations Unit, also known as Red Berets (by berets; Serbian: Црвене беретке, Crvene beretke) or Frankies (by Franko Simatović; Serbian: Френкијевци, Frenkijevci), was an elite special forces police unit of the Serbian State Security Directorate (RDB).

The JSO was created in 1996 by merging paramilitary units under the command of Željko Ražnatović "Arkan" and Franko Simatović and incorporating them into the security system of the Republic of Serbia under the auspice of Jovica Stanišić, head of the State Security Directorate. From 1996 to November 2001, it was formally under the competence of the RDB. The unit was finally disbanded in March 2003, after the Prime Minister of Serbia Zoran Đinđić was assassinated as a result of a conspiracy in which some members of the unit were involved.

Patrons and numerous members of the unit and its predecessors have been implicated and some sentenced, for war crimes during the Yugoslav Wars, as well as criminal activity. The unit's official commander Franko Simatović and its gray eminence Jovica Stanišić (head of RDB during the first half of Slobodan Milošević's rule) were convicted at International Criminal Tribunal for the former Yugoslavia for various war crimes. Various other members are convicted or being tried for the Ibar Highway assassination attempt and for the murders of Ivan Stambolić and Slavko Ćuruvija. The JSO was also reportedly involved in instances of war crimes in the Kosovo War.

== History ==
The origins of the JSO can be traced back to April 1991, on the eve of the Croatian War of Independence, when a paramilitary group led by Franko Simatović and Dragan Vasiljković set off from Belgrade to Knin, capital of the self-proclaimed Republic of Serbian Krajina. Several days earlier, on March 16, Milošević promised "preparations of appropriate units capable of defending interests of Serbia and Serb people outside Serbia" in a closed session with Serbian municipal presidents. The order of creating such a unit was given to Jovica Stanišić, Milošević's strongman and head of RDB, which committed the task to Stanišić. The unit had not had any formal connections with Belgrade, so the operation was taken solely within RDB, without the involvement of Serbian Ministry of the Interior. In Knin, Simatović and Vasiljković contacted Milan Martić, minister of the interior of Republic of Serbian Krajina, who subordinated a group of fighters under Vasiljković's command, who gave them thorough training and imposed the discipline; the unit would later become known under the name Knindže (a portmanteau of "Knin" and "ninja"), and Vasiljković under the war name "Kapetan Dragan". The name "Red Berets" came after the battle for Glina, when Vasiljković distributed the berets to his men.

The other wing of the unit was apparently formed in May 1991, in Eastern Slavonia. According to the hints given by Simatović, the unit seems to have been involved in Borovo Selo killings on 1–2 May, when 12 Croatian policemen were killed and several tens wounded. May 4 will later be taken as the unit's anniversary. According to several witness accounts, Radovan Stojičić "Badža", an official of the Serbian ministry of interior, was in charge of operations in Eastern Slavonia. Upon the arrival in the Eastern Slavonia theater, Željko Ražnatović "Arkan" took over the paramilitary unit under the name of "Serbian Volunteer Guard", later known as "Arkan's Tigers". On 23 November 1991, after taking control over Laslovo from Croatian forces, the Guard captured two Croatian T-55 tanks and began operating them. The Guard later took part in various operations in Bosnia: in Bijeljina in 1992, near Bihać in 1994, and at the Sana river in 1995. The Bihać operation, code-named "Operation Spider" ("Operacija Pauk") was done in cooperation with the Army of Serb Krajina and the Army of Republika Srpska. The goal was to assist the fledgling Autonomous Province of Western Bosnia, a Serb-allied Muslim entity fighting against the central Bosnian government. During "Operation Spider", members of the Serbian Volunteer Guard fought under the ad hoc name 3rd Tactical Group. In September 1995, at Sana river, the unit assisted the Army of Republika Srpska in re-establishing the defense lines against the joint Croatian-Bosniak offensive codenamed "Operation Mistral 2"/"Operation Sana".

These two paramilitary units were allegedly the core of future JSO. The joint unit was officially formed in 1994, under the name of Unit for anti-terrorist action ("Jedinica za antiteroristička dejstva", JATD), one year before the wars in Bosnia and Croatia came to an end. The JATD first consisted of light mobile artillery and infantry. The unit operated as a part of the State Security Directorate (Resor Državne bezbednosti), which was then a part of Serbia's Ministry of Internal Affairs.

The members of the unit first came into the public spotlight during a 1995 hostage crisis when UN personnel were being held captive by the Army of Republika Srpska. The unit members provided protection for Jovica Stanišić, head of the Serbian State Security (RDB) who, acting as a mediator, arranged for the safe release of the hostages.

In 1996, one year after the Dayton Agreement and the end of conflicts in Croatia and Bosnia, JATD was re-structured and renamed to Jedinica za specijalne operacije, or JSO. A former Yugoslav People's Army barracks in Kula was chosen for its base camp. The JSO also obtained two Ukrainian Mi-24V combat helicopters on the black market, most likely through RDB intermediaries.

At the very beginning of the Kosovo War, the unit was ordered to set up a temporary base of operations on the Goč mountain, near Kosovo. From there, JSO launched a number of operations aimed against the Kosovo Liberation Army. One of their first actions was the March 1998 successful assault on the KLA commander Adem Jashari's hideout in Prekaz. The assault was planned and coordinated together with the Special Anti-Terrorist Unit of the police. In May-July 1998, the Mi-24V helicopters of the JSO took part in a joint effort to push KLA out of Kijevo, a strategic village on the Priština-Peć road. The Serbian interior ministry took control over Kijevo on 4 July. Later in 1999, JSO engaged in fierce battles in and around Peć. Due to NATO airstrikes, the unit's Mi-24 helicopters had to be grounded. The unit operated a wide variety of armored vehicles, including American-made Hummers procured via Cyprus, which all proved to be effective for quick operations under constant NATO aerial bombardment. After the Kumanovo Agreement and the subsequent end of the war, the JSO, alongside the police and armed forces, left Kosovo.

On 3 October 1999, a vehicle column of Serbian Renewal Movement (SPO), one of Serbia's largest opposition parties at the time, was attacked while moving down Ibar Highway. A tipper truck rammed into the moving vehicles. SPO officials Veselin Bošković, Zvonko Osmajlić, Vučko Rakočević, and Dragan Vušurović were killed in the staged accident and SPO president Drašković was injured. In a ruling by the Belgrade District Court on February 16, 2007, former State Security officer and unit's commander Milorad Ulemek, was sentenced to 15 years in prison and former State Security chief Radomir Marković received eight years. Members of the Special Operations Unit, JSO, Duško Maričić, Branko Berček, Nenad Bujošević, and Leonid Milivojević were sentenced to 14 years in prison.

On 25 August 2000, former president of Serbia and once a rival of Milošević's, Ivan Stambolić was detained by the police. Soon after, he was gone missing during his every-day jogging routine. His remains were uncovered on 28 March 2003, in Fruška Gora. After a yearlong trial in Serbia's special court in Belgrade, a judge found Radomir Marković and Milorad Ulemek, guilty of planning and carrying out the assassination of Ivan Stambolić.

The unit's role in the 2000 overthrow of Slobodan Milošević remained, to this day, somewhat controversial. On 4 October, opposition leader Zoran Đinđić met with Milorad Ulemek. Ulemek struck a bargain with Đinđić that he and his unit would stand down as long as the police were not attacked. The unit was most likely given the order to storm the protesters, who rallied in downtown Belgrade on 5 October. But soon after the unit's characteristic armored Hummers appeared in front of the protesters, the vehicles simply returned to base. Later, in his book titled "Peti oktobar" ("October 5"), former State Security chief Radomir Marković claimed he was the one who ordered the unit to be deployed in Belgrade.

The policy of the new government, especially regarding the indictment of the former Serbian war leaders by the International Criminal Tribunal for the former Yugoslavia, was met with explicit disagreement from the unit's commanding officers. In 2001, JSO engaged in a mutiny, blocking the Belgrade-Niš highway. The official reason for the mutiny, was an order given to the unit to arrest the Banović brothers, wanted by the ICTY. After several days of negotiations, the JSO's mutiny ended.

During this period, disillusioned Ulemek got involved in criminal activities of the so-called Zemun Clan, by providing both intelligence information and muscle for them. During 2001, the clan kidnapped several influential businessmen and demanded millions as ransom money. Among those men were Milija Babović and Miroslav Mišković, widely considered to be the most powerful business people in Serbia at the time. In both cases, Ulemek offered his help to the police, in his official capacity. He abused that position and provided insider information to the clan: for example, when he found out that Babović's family quickly and easily collected the ransom money, he advised the clan members to demand more. Eventually, all the hostages were released, however, some were severely beaten and tortured in the process.

== Disbandment ==
The JSO was disbanded by decision of the Government of Serbia on 25 March 2003, 13 days after the assassination of Prime Minister Zoran Đinđić. Its remaining members were sacked or transferred to other police units.

- Milorad Ulemek was sentenced to 40 years in prison for assassinations of Ivan Stambolić and Zoran Đinđić each, and 15 years for Ibar Highway assassination.
- Radomir Marković was sentenced to 40 years in prison for the Ibar Highway murders and the murder of Ivan Stambolić.
- Zvezdan Jovanović was convicted of the murder of Zoran Đinđić and jailed for 40 years.
- Jovica Stanišić and Franko "Frenki" Simatović were tried for crimes against humanity and war crimes in International Criminal Tribunal for the former Yugoslavia. They were cleared of all charges on 30 May 2013. However, on 30 June 2021 they were convicted on appeal and jailed for 12 years, later increased to 15 years.
- Dragan Vasiljković moved to Australia and changed his name, but was arrested on an Interpol warrant and extradited to Croatia. On 26 December 2017 he was sentenced to 15 years in prison for war crimes.
- Željko "Arkan" Ražnatović was assassinated on 15 January 2000 in Belgrade. His assassins, from Serbian criminal circles, were arrested and tried but the speculations on political background remained.
- Radovan "Badža" Stojičić was assassinated on 11 April 1997, in Belgrade. His assassins are still at large.
- Serbian Interior Minister Ivica Dačić claimed that former members of the Red Berets took part in the Västberga helicopter robbery on 23 September 2009.

== Trivia ==
- Members of the unit have a rose tattoo on their neck, which is noted by the press during the trial of Legija.

== See also ==
- State Security Directorate
- Special Anti-Terrorist Unit
- Special Police Units
