= Milorad Ulemek =

Serbian military commander and criminal (born 1968)

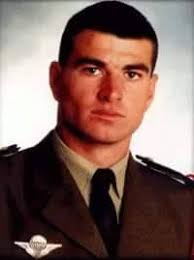
- Milorad Ulemek in the French Foreign Legion
- Born: 15 March 1968 (age 58); Belgrade, SR Serbia, Yugoslavia
- Organization: Special Operations Unit
- Spouse(s): Maja Luković; Aleksandra Ivanović
- Children: 4
- Parent(s): Milan Ulemek; Natalija Ulemek
- Status: Imprisoned
- Criminal charges: Organizer of the assassination of Zoran Đinđić, assassination of Ivan Stambolić, Ibar Highway assassination attempt executor
- Penalty: 40-year unique penalty imprisonment (137-year total penalty as imprisonment)
- Military career
- Allegiance: France; FR Yugoslavia
- Branch: French Foreign Legion; Serb Volunteer Guard; Special Operations Unit
- Service years: 1986–2002
- Rank: Colonel
- Nicknames: "Legija" "Cema" "Šareni" "Ćoro"
- Commands: Head of the Special Operations Unit
- Conflicts: Croatian War; Bosnian War; Operation Spider; Mala Kladuša offensive; Attack on Vrnograč; Kosovo War; Attack on Prekaz; Offensive on Kijevo; Battle of Junik; Yugoslav counter-offensive in Kosovo (1998); Insurgency in the Preševo Valley
- Awards

Milorad Ulemek (Serbian: Милорад Улемек; born 15 March 1968), also known as Milorad Luković (Милорад Луковић) and "Legija" ("Legion"), is a Serbian former commander of the Serbian police special unit, the Special Operations Unit (JSO) and a former paramilitary commander, who was convicted of the assassinations of Serbian Prime Minister Zoran Đinđić and former Serbian President Ivan Stambolić. He was also convicted of conspiracy in the attempted murder of Serbian opposition leader Vuk Drašković.

== Early life ==
Ulemek was born on 15 March 1968 in Belgrade. His father Milan was a sub-officer in the Yugoslav People's Army, while his mother Natalija was a housewife. Ulemek grew up in New Belgrade, near the Hotel Jugoslavija.

Although he was problematic in his early teens, he finished an auto mechanic program and medicine school in Belgrade. In 1984, he became friends with Kristijan Golubović and together the two committed their first "big" robbery. Ulemek was given the nickname "Cema" from "cement". After a botched robbery in 1985, Ulemek fled to France.

== Military career ==
=== French Foreign Legion ===
In the mid-1980s, he joined the French Foreign Legion, serving in Chad, Lebanon and Iraq. He was given the nom de guerre "Legion" (Legija) because of his military career in the Legion.

During his service and as sergeant, he did a tour in Yugoslavia as translator for the French Army. On his return, he did not come back from his leave and was considered as a deserter from the French Foreign Legion and went back into Yugoslavia when the Wars erupted in 1992.

=== Serb Volunteer Guard ===
He joined the Serb Volunteer Guard in 1992 under the control of Serbian warlord Arkan. Ulemek became one of Arkan's closest friends and a commander of the unit. He commanded the "Super Tigrovi" (Super Tigers) special unit that operated in eastern Slavonia. The unit was disbanded in April 1996, and all of its members were ordered to join the Yugoslav Army.

=== Special Operations Unit ===
In 1996, following the dissolution of the Serb Volunteer Guard, on the request by head of the State Security Directorate Jovica Stanišić, Ulemek joined the re-structured Special Operations Unit. The unit was famously known as the "Red Berets" for their apparel. In 1999, Ulemek became the leader of the "Red Berets", and became the official commander of "JSO SDB Serbia" in April 2001.

The Red Berets were used during Milošević's rule for special operations. In April 2001, he resigned after pressure from the political leadership. On 12 March 2003, right after the assassination of Serbian Prime Minister Zoran Đinđić, a country-wide manhunt, named Operation Sabre, was initiated. Twelve days later on 25 March, the unit was disbanded along with 11,000+ people being detained.

== Zemun Clan connection and Đinđić assassination ==
On 12 March 2003, some members of JSO who were connected to the notorious Zemun Clan, organized the assassination of Zoran Đinđić, with Ulemek being named the main organizer. Following the assassination, Ulemek was named the prime suspect and after 14 months of hiding, he surrendered in May 2004. Ulemek claimed that he had been hiding in his house the entire time, which made lot of controversy in public. The Đinđić murder trial was the first organised crime trial in Serbia.

The trial saw widespread threats to the trial chamber, as well as witness intimidation and the murder of a witness. The first trial chamber president, Marko Kljajević, left the proceedings in August 2005. In verdict by Special Court for Organized Crime in Belgrade Presiding Judge Nata Mesarović, Đinđić's assassination was described as "a political murder, a criminal act aimed against the state", in which police officers and the mafia had joined hands to kill Đinđić and gain political power. Ulemek's deputy in the "Red Berets", Zvezdan Jovanović, was convicted of shooting Đinđić. Ulemek was sentenced to 40 years in prison for the organization of Đinđić assassination. After several trials, Ulemek was sentenced to total of 137 years in prison for his crimes.

== Personal life ==
He was married to journalist Maja Luković, with whom he had a daughter. Following that relationship, he met Aleksandra Ivanović, with whom he has had three more daughters.

== Books ==
While serving his prison sentence, Ulemek wrote 24 books.

- Gvozdeni rov (2004)
- Legionar (2005)
- Momci iz Brazila (2006)
- Juda (2006)
- Kraj (2007)
- Čopor (2007)
- Magioničar (2008)
- Tajna moga srca (2008)
- Kroz vatru i vodu (2008)
- Za čast i slavu (2009)
- Ljubav suzama ne veruje (2010)
- Revolucija — između razuma i srca (2010)
- Krv, suze i znoj (2012)
- Staze poraza (2013)
- Poslednji konvoj (2013)
- Prah i pepeo I (2014)
- Prah i pepeo II (2015)
- Babo (2016)
- Prah i pepeo III (2017)
- U tigrovom gnezdu (2018)
- Dolina suza (2019)
- Purpurno srce (2020)
- Samuraj (2021)
- Poslednji bataljon (2022)
