= Zvezdan Jovanović =

Serbian mobster; assassin of Zoran Đinđić (born 1965)

- Born: 19 July 1965 (age 61); Breznica, near Peć, Yugoslavia
- Organization: Special Operations Unit
- Known for: Assassination of Zoran Đinđić
- Status: Imprisoned
- Criminal charges: Attempted murder and murder of a senior government official
- Penalty: 40-year imprisonment
- Military career
- Branch: Serb Volunteer Guard; Special Operations Unit
- Service years: 1991–2003
- Rank: Lieutenant colonel
- Nicknames: "Zmija" "Zveki"
- Commands: Commander of the Serb Volunteer Guard and the Special Operations Unit
- Conflicts: Yugoslav Wars

Zvezdan Jovanović (Serbian Cyrillic: Звездан Јовановић; born 19 July 1965), known by the nicknames as Zmija and Zveki, is a Serbian former paramilitary and commander of the Serb Volunteer Guard and the Special Operations Unit. In 2003, he assassinated Serbian Prime Minister Zoran Đinđić and was sentenced to 40 years in prison.

== Biography ==
Jovanović was born in the village of Breznica in Kosovo and Metohija, in 1965. He had been a locksmith until joining the Serb Volunteer Guard led by Željko Ražnatović in 1991. Jovanović had been a member of the feared Special Operations Unit and held the police rank of lieutenant colonel. He also participated in the Yugoslav Wars in the 1990s, particularly in operations in Kosovo. He was awarded the Medal of Bravery after the wars ended for being a participant in all engagements for the Serbian Forces.

=== Assassination of Zoran Đinđić ===
Jovanović was arrested on the charges of being responsible for the assassination of Serbian Prime Minister Zoran Đinđić in March 2003. He was convicted of the murder and sentenced to 40 years in prison. The evidence connected him to the infamous Zemun Clan of Serbia's organized crime network, and to its alleged leader, Milorad Ulemek.

Jovanović stated that he killed Đinđić to restore a pro-Milošević government. He was silent during most of his trial but allegedly, he soon confessed to the murder of Đinđić and said in a police report that he feels no remorse for killing him. Due to alleged interrogations, beatings and threats against his family, he claims to have been forced to falsely confess.

On 23 May 2007, Jovanović was found guilty by the Belgrade Special Court for Combating Organized Crime and was sentenced to 40 years in prison for attempted murder and murder of a senior government official. In May 2008, Serbian Radical Party leader Vojislav Šešelj compared the assassination of Đinđić to that of the assassination of Archduke Franz Ferdinand by stating that "Jovanović wanted to enjoy the same fame and glory that Gavrilo Princip has in Serbian history."

== See also ==
- Assassination of Ivan Stambolić
- Ibar Highway assassination attempt
