= Zoran Đinđić =

Prime Minister of Serbia (2001–2003)

- Зоран Ђинђић
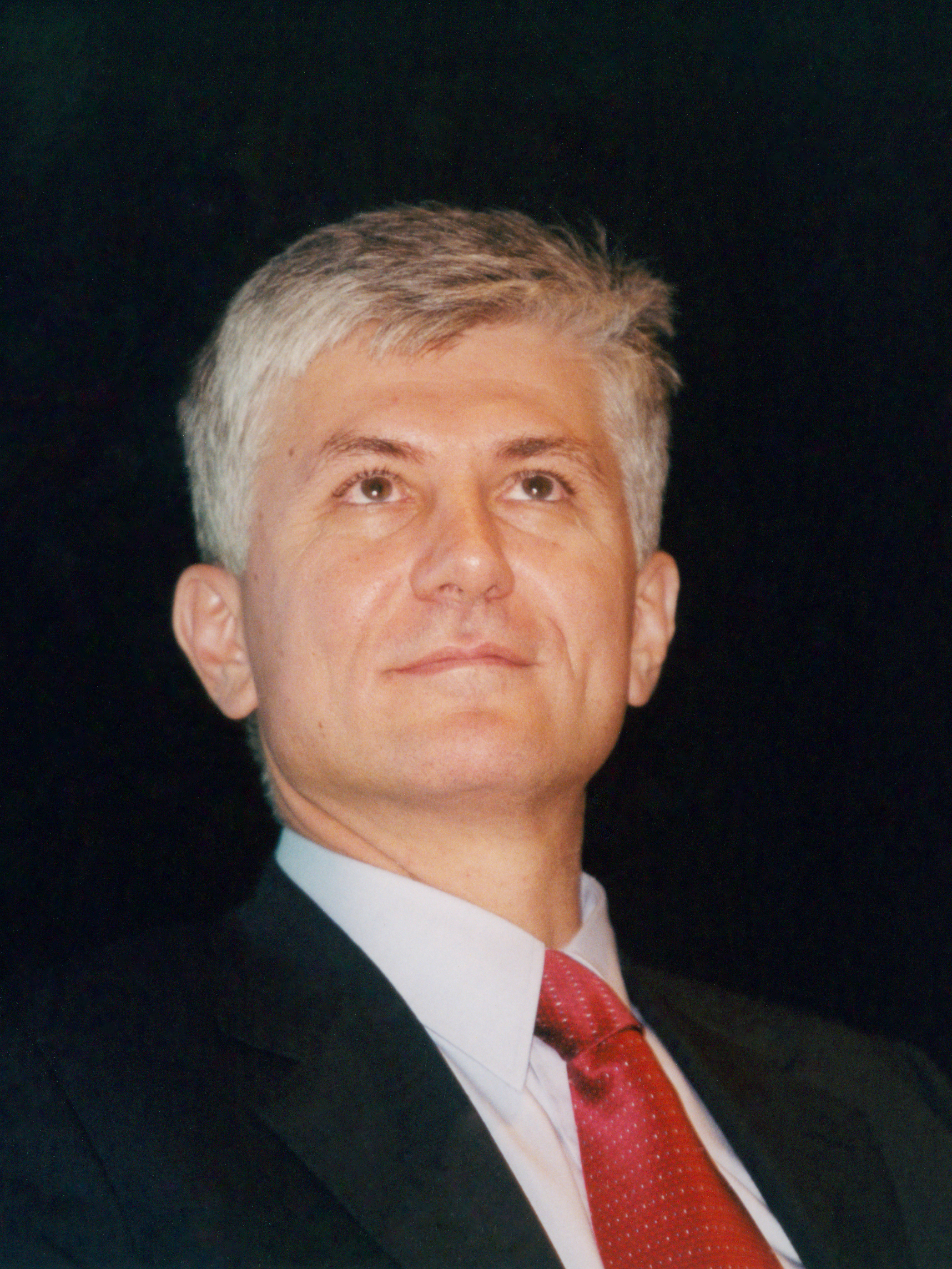
- Đinđić in April 2002

Prime Minister of Serbia
- In office 25 January 2001 – 12 March 2003
- President: Milan Milutinović; Nataša Mićić (acting)
- Preceded by: Milomir Minić
- Succeeded by: Nebojša Čović (acting)

Mayor of Belgrade
- In office 21 February 1997 – 30 September 1997
- Preceded by: Nebojša Čović
- Succeeded by: Vojislav Mihailović

Personal details
- Born: 1 August 1952 Bosanski Šamac, PR Bosnia and Herzegovina, FPR Yugoslavia
- Died: 12 March 2003 (aged 50) Belgrade, Serbia and Montenegro
- Cause of death: Assassination
- Party: DS (1990–2003)
- Spouse: Ružica Đinđić (m. 1990)
- Children: Jovana; Luka
- Education: University of Belgrade; University of Konstanz
- Awards

- Website: zorandjindjic.org
- Zoran Đinđić's voice Đinđić expressing his intention to undertake reforms to meet European Union standards Recorded 7 November 2002

Zoran Đinđić (Note: Serbian Cyrillic: Зоран Ђинђић, pronounced [zɔ̝̌ran d͡ʑîːnd͡ʑit͡ɕ]) (1 August 1952 – 12 March 2003) was a Serbian politician and philosopher who served as the prime minister of Serbia from 2001 until his assassination in 2003. He was the mayor of Belgrade in 1997, becoming the first non-communist and first democratically elected official to hold both key positions after World War II. Đinđić was a long-time opposition politician and held a doctorate in philosophy.

Đinđić was one of the original thirteen restorers of the modern day Democratic Party, becoming its president in 1994. During the 1990s, he was one of the co-leaders of the opposition to the administration of Slobodan Milošević, and became the Prime Minister of Serbia in 2001 after the overthrow of Milošević.

As Prime Minister, he advocated pro-democratic reforms and the integration of Serbia into European structures. His government ratified the European Convention on Human Rights and implemented innovations in line with the Council of Europe recommendations, which led to the introduction of institutions for the protection of human rights and freedoms, as well as for Serbia and Montenegro to become a member state of the Council of Europe in 2003. His government strongly advocated cooperation with the International Criminal Tribunal for the former Yugoslavia (ICTY). Following the arrest of Special Operations Unit (JSO) members and extradition to the ICTY, the JSO organized an armed mutiny in November 2001 in Belgrade. Đinđić was assassinated in 2003 by Zvezdan Jovanović, a former JSO member operative with ties to the Zemun Clan.

== Early life and education ==
Đinđić was born in Bosanski Šamac, Bosnia and Herzegovina, Yugoslavia where his father was stationed as an officer of the Yugoslav People's Army (JNA). His paternal side hailed from Toplica in southern Serbia. His mother Mila Dušanić (c. 1931/2 – 14 March 2016), a housewife, raised him and his elder sister Gordana; the family moved according to his father's jobs. Ten years of Zoran's childhood were spent in the town of Travnik, in central Bosnia. Eventually, the family moved to the capital, Belgrade, after his mother had gained a post there. Đinđić attended Ninth Belgrade Gymnasium, subsequently enrolling at the University of Belgrade's Faculty of Philosophy, graduating in 1974. During his university days he developed an interest in politics.

After being convicted in 1974 by the communist authorities and through Party-controlled media for his role in his attempt to organize an independent political movement of Yugoslav students, Đinđić emigrated to West Germany thanks to the intervention of former German Chancellor Willy Brandt, who persuaded authorities to let Đinđić come to Germany instead of serving his sentence in Yugoslavia. Đinđić continued his studies in Germany and obtained a PhD in philosophy in 1979 under the supervision of Albrecht Wellmer, professor at the University of Konstanz and a student/former assistant of Jürgen Habermas. As a student, he was greatly influenced by Habermas's advice that an intellectual had a duty not only to think, but to act. One fellow Yugoslav student who knew him in Germany, Milorad Vučelić, recalled that Đinđić was known on campus "not only for his brilliance as a student, but that he was open to life. He wasn't a typical boring intellectual. He knew how to live. He had great-looking girlfriends. He was extremely cool." While a student at the University of Konstanz, he maintained close ties to student anarchist groups and participated in the Praxis-run Korčula Summer School. He became proficient in German. Later, three months before serving as Serbian prime minister, he also mastered English.

== Political career ==
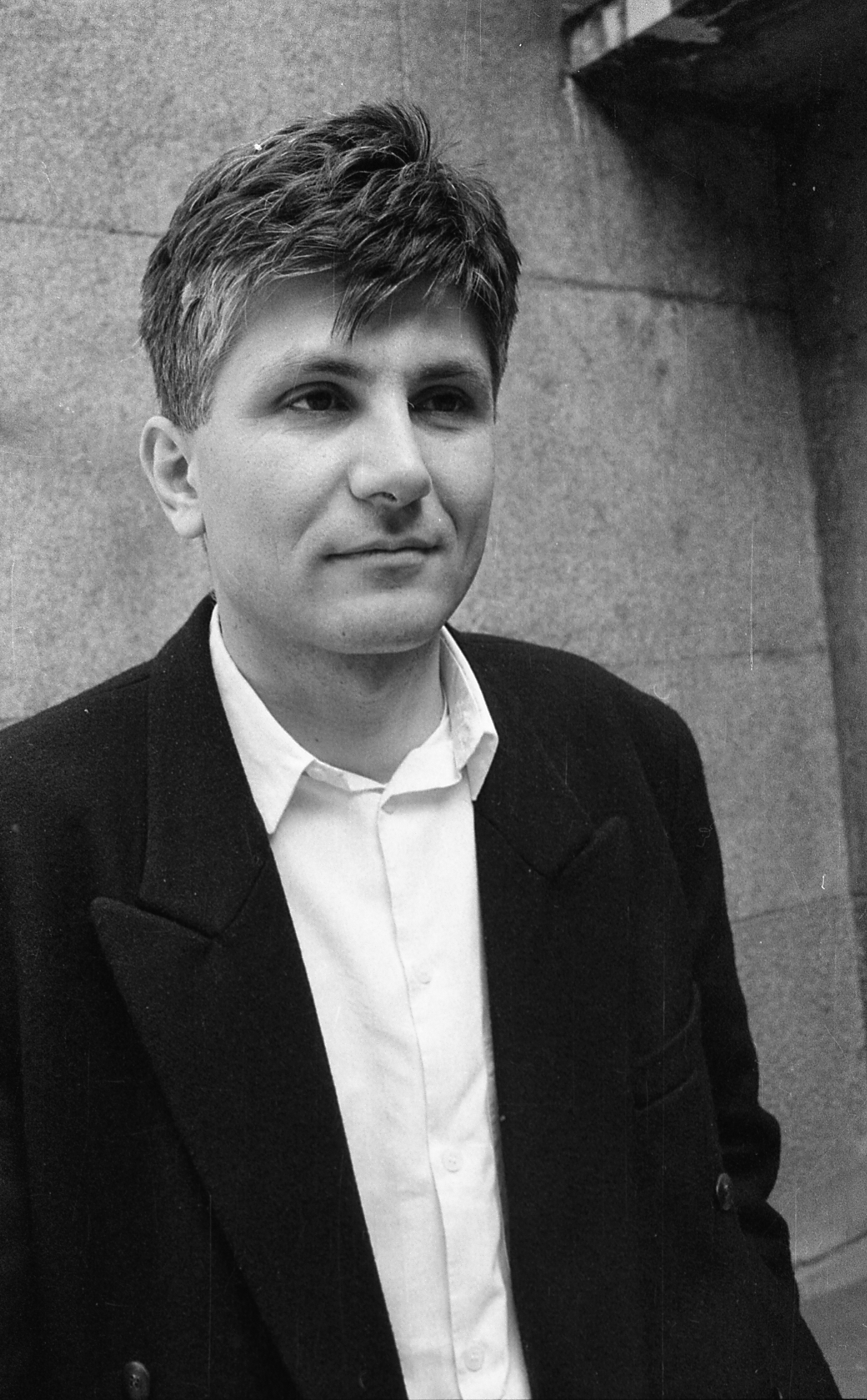
Đinđić in the 1990s by Stevan Kragujević

In 1979, Đinđić returned to Yugoslavia to take a teaching post at the University of Novi Sad. In the 1980s, he was a writer for the Literary Review, an influential Belgrade journal. He also held a post-doctoral fellowship from the Alexander von Humboldt Foundation.

In an essay in the June 1988 edition of the Literary Review, Đinđić called for preserving the status quo established in 1974 with the Kosovo region to remain an autonomous province within the Socialist Republic of Serbia, declaring that if Kosovo were to lose its autonomy: "we will be able to declare with considerable certainty that in every future Serbian state Kosovo will be a permanent source of repression." Đinđić's stance on the Kosovo question marked him as an opponent of Slobodan Milošević who starting in 1987 had campaigned to end Kosovo's autonomy. One intellectual, Drinka Gojković recalled in 1996: "You can't imagine how wonderful it was then to read his writing. While everyone was screaming, using shocking language to fan hatred, Zoran was writing these beautiful essays, arguing that nationalism was not the way". On 28 June 1989, Milošević ended the autonomy of Kosovo, which caused much alarm in the other Yugoslav republics where it was feared that Milošević might do something similar.

On 11 December 1989 together with other Serb intellectuals and pro-democracy activists he founded the liberal Democratic Party (DS) based on the similarly conceptualized Democratic Party that existed in the Kingdom of Yugoslavia. He became the party's Executive Board Chairman in 1990, and got elected to the Parliament of Serbia the same year. In the early 1990s, Đinđić shifted over to a more nationalist position that was broadly supportive of Milošević's policies, much to the chagrin of his former admirers. In 1993, he played a leading role in writing the platform of the DS, calling for a referendum on the restoration of the monarchy. Đinđić made it clear that he personally favored restoring the House of Karađorđević. The same platform called for the Kosovo region to remain part of Serbia proper and for the government to take anti-natalist policies designed to limit the birthrate of the Kosovo Albanians. In January 1994 he replaced Dragoljub Mićunović as President of the Democratic Party.

The new balance of power within DS led to an early party conference. At the party conference on 5 January 1994 in Belgrade, Đinđić became president, pushing out personal political mentor Mićunović who was forced into resigning as the local party branches turned against him. The (in)famous quip uttered at the conference by 41-year-old Đinđić about 63-year-old Mićunović was: "Mićunović's time has passed.... He's no Tina Turner who sings better now than when she was thirty". In his embittered speech at the conference during which he resigned his post, Mićunović characterized the manner of Đinđić's takeover of DS as the "combination of Machiavellianism and revolutionary technique". In this internal party showdown with Mićunović, Đinđić also benefited from some discreet support in the Milošević-controlled state-run media. Though many DS members didn't like the way this transfer of power was executed, symbolically referring to it as "oceubistvo" (patricide), Đinđić managed to quickly move DS away from what he occasionally referred to in derisive terms as the "debate club" towards a modern and efficient organizational structure that functioned according to a business management model. In February 1994, Đinđić visited Pale to meet with Radovan Karadžić, saying that he had gone to Bosnia to "express solidarity with the people of the Bosnian Serb republic."

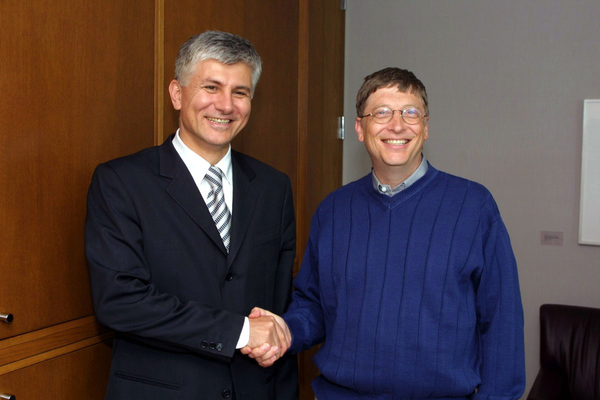
Đinđić and Bill Gates, August 2001

The following year, on 15 April 1995, regular party conference was held and Đinđić got re-elected as party president. Though a much better organized party under Đinđić, DS still experienced trouble formulating a clear stance on the national question. Đinđić's own actions perhaps made a good illustration of this seemingly confused standing on both sides of the issue. Đinđić basically refused to acknowledge the national question as a real issue, making not a single mention of the Serbs living in other parts of the former Yugoslavia in his book Yugoslavia as an Unfinished State. At the same time he maintained close links with Bosnian Serb politician and the President of Republika Srpska Radovan Karadžić, visiting him at Pale in February 1994 while American forces threatened to bombard Bosnian Serb positions. This seeming flip-flopping on the national issue was effectively used by DS' political opponents and Đinđić's critics across the political spectrum.

As the Bosnian War ended with the signing of the Dayton Agreement in November 1995, in addition to his grip on power domestically, Milošević enjoyed stable support from the international community that recognized him as the "peace and stability factor in the Balkans". The next chance to dent his armour came at the November 1996 municipal elections, which the DS entered as part of an opposition coalition called Zajedno featuring SPO, DSS, and GSS. Democratic Party (at the time with a total of only 7,000 members across Serbia) joined Zajedno against Đinđić's personal wishes as he got outvoted on three separate occasions when the decision was discussed internally. Following opposition victories in key Serbian cities such as Belgrade, Niš and Novi Sad, Milošević refused to recognize the results, sparking three months of protest marches by hundreds of thousands of citizens. After a massive series of public protests over election fraud perpetrated by the central government under Slobodan Milošević during the winter 1996–1997, Đinđić became Mayor of Belgrade, the first post-communist mayor to hold that post after the Second World War. Under pressure, Milošević acknowledged the results and on 21 February 1997 Đinđić got inaugurated as the mayor.

Later that year Đinđić made a bold decision to boycott the parliamentary elections on 21 December 1997, thus breaking up the Zajedno coalition. United only by their political enemy, the coalition "Zajedno" (Together) with Vuk Drašković's SPO and Vesna Pešić's GSS collapsed only four months after their victory. Đinđić was voted out of his position as Belgrade mayor by the SPO, SPS and SRS.

Đinđić and his party boycotted the 1997 Serbian presidential and parliamentary elections, as did others in the "democratic bloc" including Vojislav Koštunica's Democratic Party of Serbia. This caused the Socialists and Radicals to sweep most of the seats, leaving the third largest portion to Vuk Drašković's SPO. The boycott helped forced a second set of elections when the second round was ruled to have had insufficient turnout. Serbian law at the time mandated at least 50% turnout for a president to be elected.

In this case, Vojislav Šešelj won the second round against the Socialists' Zoran Lilić; when the election was re-done, Šešelj lost to the Socialists' Milan Milutinović. This caused Šešelj to allege electoral fraud and lead protests against the government. He changed his mind however, when the Kosovo crisis began in early 1998, and his Radicals joined the government as a coalition partner. When Vuk Drašković joined the Yugoslav government in early 1999, this left Đinđić as Serbia's main opposition leader as NATO's war began against Yugoslavia.

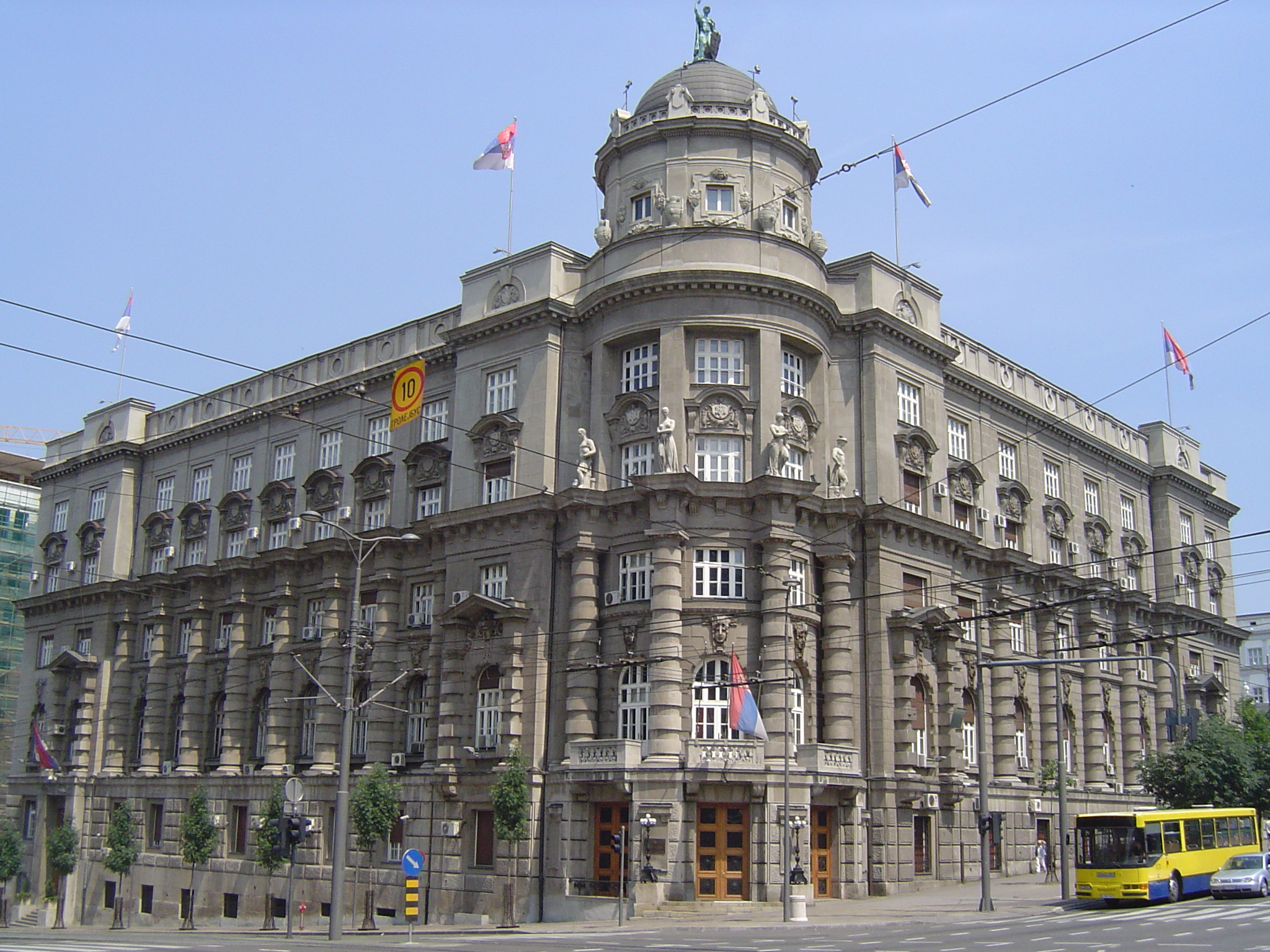
The building of the Serbian Government

After former secret policeman, anti-Milošević publisher and journalist Slavko Ćuruvija was murdered on Orthodox Easter during NATO bombing of Yugoslavia, Đinđić sought safety and fled to temporary exile in Montenegro, allegedly because he was next on the assassination list of then-President Slobodan Milošević's secret service.

In September 1999, Đinđić was named by Time magazine as one of the most important politicians at the beginning of the 21st century. Upon his return to the country in July 1999, Đinđić was charged with draft dodging; charges were subsequently dropped by military prosecutors the following month.

A series of mysterious assassinations, including the shooting of Yugoslav Defence Minister Pavle Bulatović on 7 February 2000 in a restaurant, began taking place. Serbian Radical Party leader Vojislav Šešelj maintained during his testimony at Milošević's trial that this murder was carried as a prelude to the successful hijacking of the Socialist People's Party of Montenegro in October 2000 by Predrag Bulatović, who successfully reversed the parliamentary majority won by Milošević and his allies, moving his party in alliance with Đinđić's Democratic Opposition of Serbia (DOS). In April, JAT chairman and Yugoslav United Left member Žika Petrović was gunned down as he was walking his dog. In late August, former Serbian President Ivan Stambolić disappeared; he had been murdered on Fruška Gora mountain by members of Serbia's Special Operations Unit. Đinđić and his allies openly accused Milošević of these events, claiming that he had either ordered them or was no longer able to maintain control and should therefore step down.

Đinđić played a prominent role in the September 2000 presidential elections in the Federal Republic of Yugoslavia and in the 5th October uprising that overthrew Milošević after further street protests. While Koštunica headlined the effort in October, Đinđić led the broad-based 19-party Democratic Opposition of Serbia (DOS) coalition to its victory in Serbian elections of December 2000. The Democratic Party was the largest party of the Democratic Opposition of Serbia block that won 64.7% of the votes in the December 2000 elections, getting 176 of 250 seats in the Parliamentary Assembly. In 2001 Đinđić was appointed Prime Minister of Serbia at the head of the first post-Milošević government on 25 January 2001.

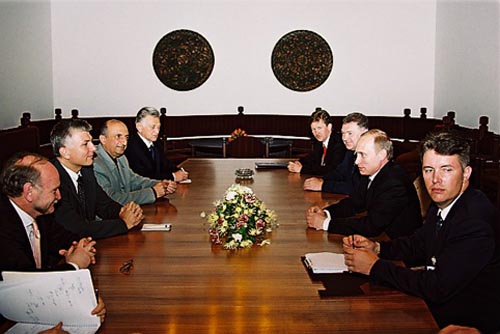
Đinđić meeting with the president of Russia, Vladimir Putin

On 1 April 2001, former president Slobodan Milošević was arrested by Yugoslav authorities. Although no official charges were made, Milošević was suspected of abuse of power and corruption. Following Milošević's arrest, the United States pressured the Yugoslav government to extradite Milošević to the ICTY or lose financial aid from the IMF and World Bank. President Koštunica opposed extradition of Milošević, arguing that it would violate the Yugoslav Constitution. Prime Minister Đinđić called an extraordinary meeting of the government to issue a decree for extradition. Milošević's lawyers appealed the extradition process to the Yugoslav Constitutional Court. The court requested two weeks to deliberate the appeal. Ignoring objections from the president and the constitutional court, Đinđić ordered the extradition of Milošević to the ICTY. On 28 June, Milošević was flown by helicopter from Belgrade to the U.S. air base in Tuzla, Bosnia and Herzegovina from where he was then flown to The Hague, Netherlands.

Đinđić played a key role in sending Milošević to the ICTY in The Hague. The extradition caused political turmoil in Yugoslavia. President Koštunica denounced the extradition as illegal and unconstitutional, while a junior party in the Đinđić coalition government left in protest. Đinđić stated there would be negative consequences if the government did not cooperate. Additionally, the government argued that sending Milošević to the ICTY was not extradition as it is a UN institution and not a foreign country. Following the extradition, Yugoslavia received approximately $1 billion dollars in financial aid. Later, Đinđić said that he became disillusioned with the protracted trial of Milošević, qualifying it as a "circus". Đinđić said the court in The Hague was "allowing Milošević to behave like a demagogue and to control the trial".

In August 2001, after meeting with Koštunica's cabinet, former Serbian State Security officer Momir Gavrilović was murdered. Koštunica claimed that Gavrilović was briefing his cabinet about connections of some members of Serbian government with organized crime. This caused Koštunica and his 45 DSS members of parliament to withdraw from DOS and the government. Đinđić attempted to expel the DSS members from parliament, referring to the existence of imperative mandate that places all deputies under the control of the party elected to parliament. Meanwhile, Koštunica and his party openly accused Đinđić of involvement with organised crime.

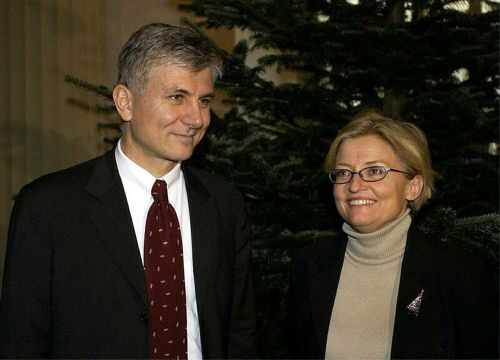
Đinđić and Swedish Foreign Minister Anna Lindh in Stockholm. Lindh was due to meet Đinđić in Belgrade in March 2003, moments before his assassination. Lindh was assassinated herself in Stockholm six months later.

Đinđić was received favorably by Western nations. His meetings with Western leaders George W. Bush, Tony Blair, Jacques Chirac and others strongly indicated that the West supported his politics. Đinđić had constant disagreements with his ex-coalition partner and then-Yugoslav federal president Vojislav Koštunica, who was his biggest political rival in Serbia itself. His earlier close relationship with the Montenegrin president Milo Đukanović had also cooled due to Đukanović's separatist aspirations for an independent Montenegro state.

Đinđić had also increased economic reforms while prime minister of Serbia. Such reforms include price liberalization and a reduction of the money supply with the goal of achieving macroeconomic stability. Small-scale privatization also occurred with regards to banking assets and the financial sector. Lastly, the government of Serbia eliminated many trade barriers with the goal of eventually integrating into the European Union. The early economic reforms under the Koštunica-Đinđić government had been maintained after his assassination allowing the economy to increase substantially prior to the global economic crisis of 2008. However, unemployment still remained very high, and the pace and quantity of reforms did not return Serbia to the same living standards it had prior to 1990.

From January 2003, Đinđić launched a wide diplomatic campaign for the determination of the Kosovo issue.

Shortly before his assassination, Đinđić made a statement in which he talked about an idea of creating a Union of Serb States consisting of Serbia, Montenegro and Republika Srpska, which would be a federal nation state.

== Assassination ==
As reported by Reuters on 18 March 2003, according to Carla Del Ponte, Đinđić had predicted his own assassination on 17 February just weeks before it happened. Despite Koštunica's accusations of Đinđić being close to organised crime, the latter always insisted that he was determined to clean Serbia, and created the "Special Tribunal" with a witness protection program. This alarmed organized crime leaders who were intertwined with elements of the Serbian secret police which remained loyal to the ousted Milošević.

Under orders from Milorad "Legija" Ulemek, the former commander of the Special Operations Unit of Yugoslavia's secret police, Đinđić was assassinated by Ulemek's soldier Zvezdan Jovanović in Belgrade on 12 March 2003. Jovanović shot him from the building across from the main Serbian government building at 12:23 PM, hitting him once in the chest. The high-powered bullet from a Heckler & Koch G3 rifle penetrated his heart and killed him almost instantly.

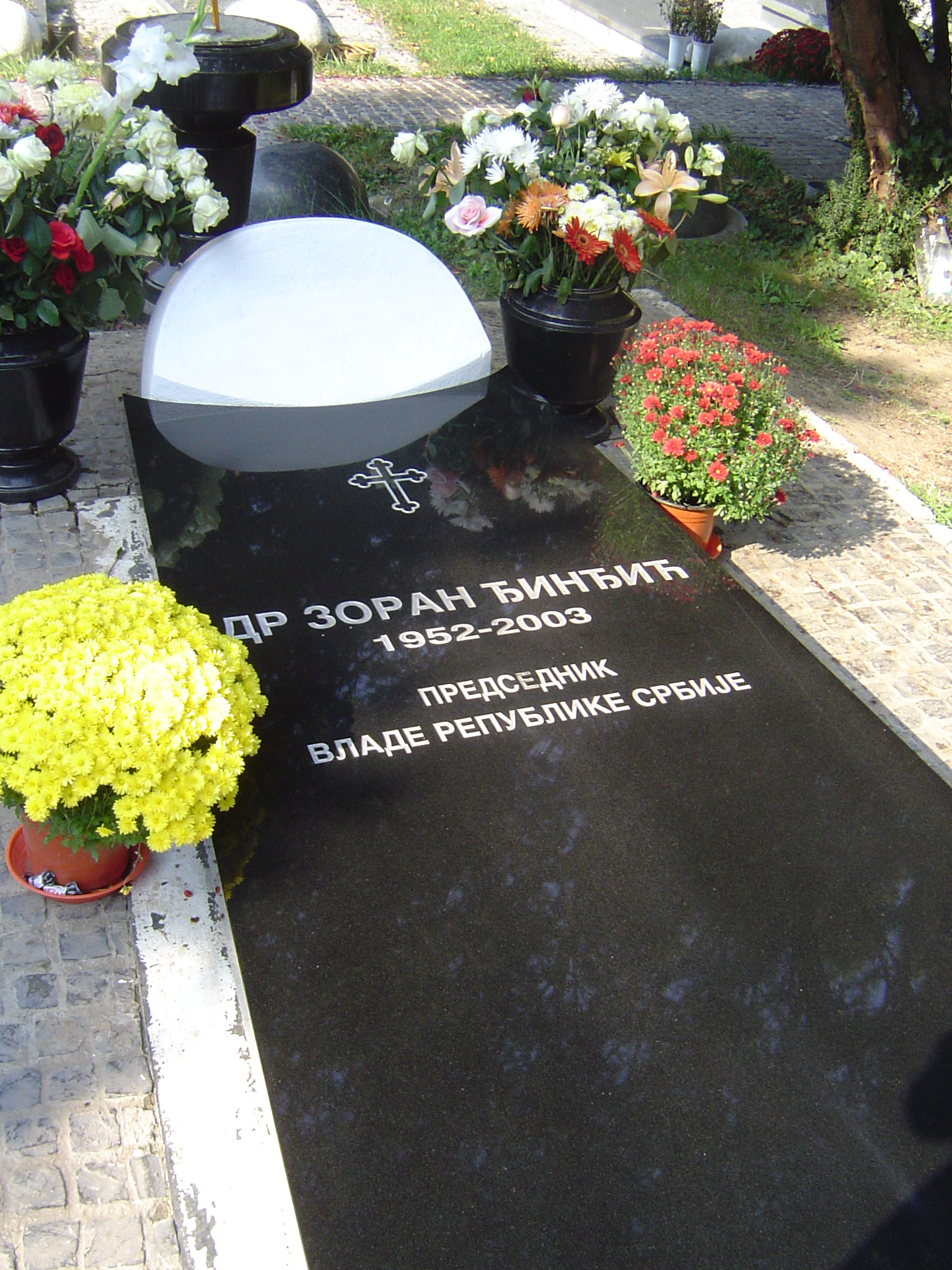
Tomb of Đinđić on the Alley of Meritorious Citizens, New Cemetery in Belgrade

He was rushed to a hospital where he was treated, but pronounced dead one hour later. Ulemek was blamed as the mastermind of the crime. He was one of the central figures in the Zemun clan, a leading organized crime group in Serbia. He was later prosecuted and convicted of involvement in some of the mysterious assassinations and assassination attempts that marked Yugoslavia in the months before Đinđić took power. Nataša Mićić, then acting President of Serbia, declared a state of emergency immediately. Zoran Živković was elected by the Serbian Democratic Party as Đinđić's successor.

On 23 May 2007, twelve men were convicted for the assassination of Zoran Đinđić. Among the convicted defendants was Ulemek, who, during the four years preceding the murder of Đinđić, had traveled to Switzerland, Austria, the Republic of Macedonia, Greece, Singapore and Croatia using a fraudulent passport that had been one of a batch of blank passports stolen from the Croatian Consulate in Mostar, Bosnia and Herzegovina in 1999. Ulemek, along with Zvezdan Jovanović, was charged with being the ringleader of the assassination plot carried out on 12 March 2003, when Đinđić was fatally shot. Three of the twelve men convicted are still on the run and remain the subject of INTERPOL Red notices. Specialist officers in INTERPOL's Fugitive Investigative Support Unit continue to liaise with and assist member countries in the investigation of various leads for the following individuals wanted by Serbian authorities: Milan Jurišić, Ninoslav Konstantinović and Vladimir Milisavljević.

== Literary work ==
He published four books and more than a hundred articles and essays on various topics.

Books published in Serbian:

- Subjektivnost i nasilje, Nastаnak sistemа u filozofiji nemаčkog ideаlizmа, (Subjectivity and Violence: The Origin of Systems in German Idealist Philosophy) Istrаživаčko-izdаvаčki centаr SSO Srbije, Izаzovi, 1982, drugo izdаnje Novi Sаd, Dnevnik, 2003
- Jesen dijаlektike, Kаrl Mаrks i utemeljenje kritičke teorije društvа, (An Autumn of Dialectics: Karl Marx and the Foundations of Critical Social Theory) Mlаdost, V Velikа edicijа idejа, 1987
- Jugoslаvijа kаo nedovršena držаvа, (Yugoslavia as an Incomplete State) Književna zаjednicа Novi Sаd, Anthropos, 1988
- Srbija ni na istoku ni na zаpаdu, (Serbia: Neither East Nor West) Cepelin, 1996
- Jedna srpska vizija, (One Serbian Vision) Ateneum, 2004

== Personal life ==
Đinđić and his wife Ružica had a daughter and a son, Jovana and Luka, both minors at the time of his assassination.

== Legacy ==
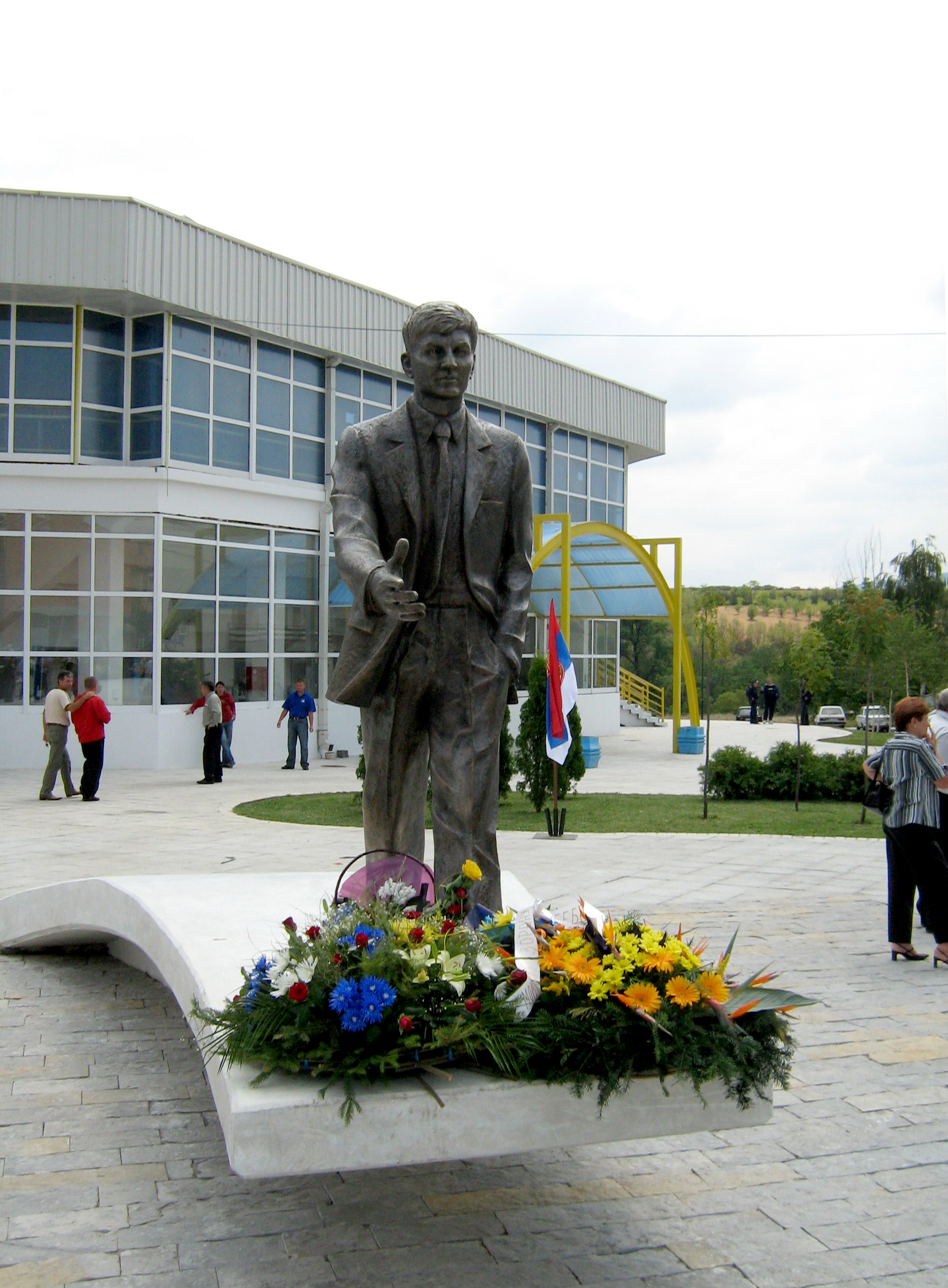
Monument to Đinđić in Prokuplje

His state procession and funeral, held on 15 March 2003, was attended by hundreds of thousands of citizens and by foreign delegations. Đinđić's death represented a political and moral tragedy to many Serbs who saw in him a statesman of hope who offered peaceful coexistence with neighboring nations, integration to Europe and the rest of the world, economic prosperity and a brighter future. He appealed to people in Serbia whose goal was for their country to join the West and for their lives to become more normalized.

Đinđić and Vojislav Koštunica both needed each other for their respective goals. Koštunica believed that Serbia needed to join the West so that it could keep Kosovo and so that Republika Srpska could be maintained. Koštunica, who served as Đinđić's political opponent and critic during his premiership, acknowledged his work two years later with these words:

Zoran Đinđić was the first to take this difficult task to lead government in very unstable times. Probably his energy and commitment made it possible for things to move forward. It is one thing to watch it from the sidelines and it is completely different to be a part of it. I understand that now when I am Prime Minister and watch things a bit differently. He was very important for the whole process.

Following his death, a small but influential movement emerged throughout Serbia and the Serbian diaspora organized around a short documentary about Zoran Đinđić (created by Belgrade director Aleksandar Mandić). The documentary – "Ako Srbija Stane" (If Serbia stops) – was a collection of edited speeches given by Đinđić on a speaking tour in Serbia shortly before his death. A movement called "Kapiraj" created a network of students and other young people who were committed to copying and distributing the documentary free of charge. This campaign was known by the slogan "Kapiraj-kopiraj" (which means "Catch on and Copy" in Serbian). Đinđić is often described as a Machiavellian figure due to his political manoeuvrings, though observers also note his pragmatic and modest approach, traits which contrasted with some of the other Serbian politicians of his time.

== Media ==
- If Serbia stops – Movie "Ako Srbija stane" with subtitle in English

Political offices
Preceded by Milomir Minić	Prime Minister of Serbia; 2001–2003	Succeeded by Zoran Živković
Preceded by Nebojša Čović	Mayor of Belgrade; 1997	Succeeded by Vojislav Mihailović
Party political offices
Preceded by Dragoljub Mićunović	President of the Democratic Party; 1994–2003	Succeeded by Boris Tadić
