= Aleksandar Šešelj =

Serbian politician

- Александар Шешељ
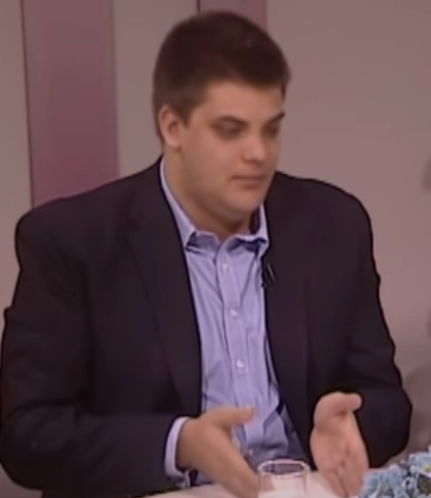

Member of the National Assembly of the Republic of Serbia
- In office 21 September 2017 – 3 August 2020

Member of the Parliamentary Assembly of the Council of Europe
- In office 24 November 2017 – 24 January 2021

Personal details
- Born: 25 September 1993 (age 33) Belgrade, Serbia, FR Yugoslavia
- Party: SRS
- Parent(s): Vojislav Šešelj; Jadranka Šešelj
- Occupation: Student, politician

Aleksandar Šešelj (Serbian Cyrillic: Александар Шешељ; born 25 September 1993) is a Serbian politician. He served in the Serbian parliament from 2017 to 2020 as a member of the far-right Serbian Radical Party (SRS). Šešelj is the son of Radical Party leader and convicted war criminal Vojislav Šešelj.

== Early life and career ==
Šešelj was born in Belgrade, Serbia, in what was then the Federal Republic of Yugoslavia. During his parliamentary term, he was a student at the University of Belgrade Faculty of Law; in the 2022 Serbian parliamentary election, he was described as an advanced university student.

== Politician ==
=== Early years (2013–17) ===
Šešelj appeared in the fifth position on the Radical Party's electoral list for the Zemun municipal assembly in the 2013 Serbian local elections. The following year, he received the twenty-fifth position on the party's list in the 2014 Serbian parliamentary election. In both instances, the party failed to cross the electoral threshold for assembly representation.

Šešelj again received the twenty-fifth position on the SRS list in the 2016 parliamentary election. The list won twenty-two seats, and he was not initially elected. He also led the party's list for Zemun in the concurrent 2016 Serbian local elections; the Radicals won nine out of fifty-seven seats in the municipal assembly and afterward participated in a coalition government led by the Serbian Progressive Party (SNS). On 17 June 2016, Šešelj was appointed to the Zemun municipal council (i.e., the executive branch of the municipal government).

He took part in a youth delegation to China in November 2016, describing that country as a "true and sincere friend" of Serbia. He was also part of a Radical Party delegation to Crimea in March 2017 to mark the three-year anniversary of the area's de facto joining of the Russian Federation. The government of Ukraine, which considers Crimea to be its sovereign territory, issued a five-year travel ban on Šešelj and other members of the delegation. Šešelj responded sarcastically that it would have been "a shame if no sanctions were imposed."

=== Parliamentarian (2017–20) ===
Šešelj received a parliamentary mandate on 25 September 2017 as a replacement for Radical Party delegate Milovan Bojić, who had resigned. As he could not hold a dual mandate, Šešelj stood down from the Zemun municipal council on 27 October. During his assembly term, he was at different times a member of the health and family committee and the European integration committee and a deputy member of the environmental protection committee. For the entirety of his term, he was a member of Serbia's parliamentary friendship group with China.

He became a member of Serbia's delegation to the Parliamentary Assembly of the Council of Europe (PACE) on 24 November 2017, again as a replacement for Bojić. He served on the PACE committee on social affairs, health, and sustainable development, and was an alternate member of the committee on culture, science, education, and media. In June 2018, he caused a minor diplomatic incident by asking Croatian foreign minister Marija Pejčinović Burić when Croatia would "return the Republic of Serb Krajina (RSK) to the people who fled before the knives of the Ustaše" (as he described the events of 1995's Operation Storm).

For most of his time in the PACE, Šešelj was not a member of any political grouping. He joined the Free Democrats Group on 26 March 2019 and became one of its vice-chairs on 10 April. The group ceased to exist on 30 June of the same year.

He was the deputy leader of Miljan Damjanović's election staff in the latter's bid to become mayor of Belgrade in the 2018 city election.

=== Since 2020 ===
Šešelj was promoted to the fourth position on the Radical Party's list in the 2020 parliamentary election. As in 2014, the list did not cross the electoral threshold, and his term ended when the new parliament was sworn in on 3 August 2020. He once again led the party's list for Zemun in the concurrent 2020 local elections and was re-elected when the list won two mandates. He resigned from the municipal assembly on 10 September 2020. His term in the PACE ended in January 2021.

He received the third position on the Radical Party's list in both the 2022 and 2023 parliamentary elections. In both instances, the list failed to cross the electoral threshold.

Šešelj is currently the deputy president of the Radical Party and a frequent spokesperson for the party in the Serbian media. In May 2022, he argued against imposing sanctions on Russia in response to the Russian invasion of Ukraine.

The SRS contested the 2024 Serbian local elections as part of the Progressive Party's electoral alliance. Šešelj appeared in the seventh position on the SNS-led list for the Zemun municipal assembly and was elected to a third term in that body when the list won a majority victory with thirty-five out of fifty-seven seats. He resigned his seat on 8 July 2024, the day the assembly convened.

In November 2024, Russian foreign affairs minister Sergey Lavrov awarded Šešelj the Order for Contribution to the Strengthening of Peace.

== Personal life ==
At his wedding in June 2023, his godfather, Serbian president Aleksandar Vučić, and Milovan Bojić were present.
