= Dragan Todorović (politician) =

Serbian politician

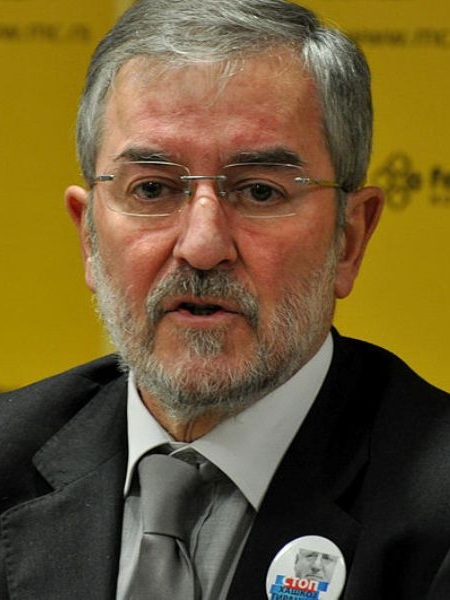

Deputy Prime Minister of Serbia
- In office 20 November 1999 – 24 October 2000
- President: Milan Milutinović
- Prime Minister: Mirko Marjanović

Minister of Infrastructure
- In office 24 March 1998 – 11 November 1999
- Preceded by: Svetolik Kostadinović
- Succeeded by: Ratko Marčetić

Personal details
- Born: 25 January 1953 (age 73) Gornji Milanovac, FPR Yugoslavia
- Party: Serbian Radical Party (1991–2012)
- Education: University of Belgrade Faculty of Organizational Sciences
- Occupation: Politician

Dragan Todorović (Serbian Cyrillic: Драган Тодоровић; born 25 January 1953) is a Serbian politician who was the vice-president of the Serbian Radical Party. He was the Radical Party representative in the Parliaments of Federal Republic of Yugoslavia and Serbia and Montenegro. He was elected as a Radical Party representative in the Serbian Parliament twice, in January 2007 and in May 2008.

== Political career ==
After Tomislav Nikolić, deputy leader of the SRS in the absence of Vojislav Šešelj, resigned from the party in 2008, Todorović became president of the Radical Party parliamentary group. Although Todorović was seen as the new Deputy Leader of the Serbian Radical Party, Šešelj decided to abolish this party function.

While a member of the Serbian Radical Party, Todorović made statements that Serbia should include territory up to the Virovitica-Karlovac-Karlobag line, which would incorporate Bosnian and Croatian sovereign territory.

=== Departure from the Serbian Radical Party ===
On May 27, 2012, Danas reported that Todorović was ejected by the Serbian Radical Party, allegedly due to a disagreement between himself and Vojislav Šešelj. Three years later, after Šešelj was released from the Hague Tribunal, Serbian newspaper Blic reported that Šešelj asked Todorović to return to SRS, and that Todorović rejected Šešelj's offer.
