= Miljan Damjanović =

Serbian politician

- Миљан Дамјановић
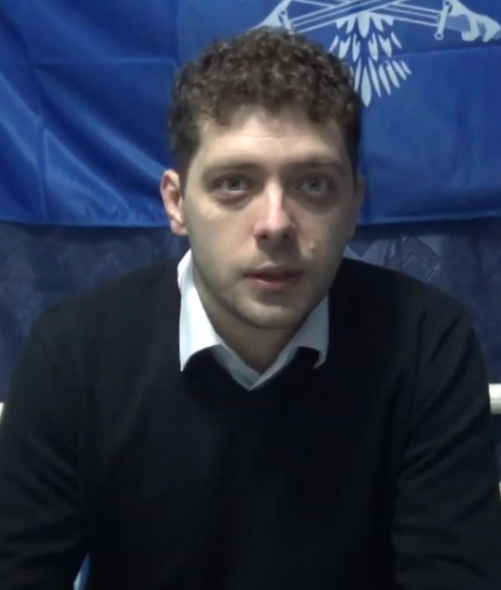

Member of the City Council of Belgrade
- Incumbent
- Assumed office 24 June 2024

Member of the National Assembly of the Republic of Serbia
- In office 3 June 2016 – 3 August 2020

Substitute Member of the Parliamentary Assembly of the Council of Europe
- In office 10 October 2016 – 24 January 2021

Personal details
- Born: 3 January 1984 (age 42) Prizren, SR Serbia, SFR Yugoslavia
- Party: SRS

Miljan Damjanović (Serbian Cyrillic: Миљан Дамјановић; born 3 January 1984) is a Serbian politician. He served in the Serbian parliament from 2016 to 2020 and has been a member of the Belgrade city council (i.e., the executive branch of the city government) since June 2024. Damjanović is a member of the far-right Serbian Radical Party (SRS).

== Early life and career ==
Damjanović was born in Prizren, in what was then the Socialist Autonomous Province of Kosovo in the Socialist Republic of Serbia, Socialist Federal Republic of Yugoslavia. He has written that he and his family were forced to leave their home after the 1998–99 Kosovo War. Now living in Belgrade, he is a graduated economist and master engineer of organizational sciences.

== Politician ==
=== Early years (2003–16) ===
Damjanović joined the Radical Party in 2003. In the 2008 Serbian local elections, he was given the seventh position on the party's electoral list for the Belgrade municipality of Stari Grad and received a mandate after the list won eleven seats. The alliance around the Democratic Party (DS) won a majority victory, and the Radicals served in opposition.

The Radical Party experienced a serious split later in 2008, with several leading members joining the more moderate Serbian Progressive Party (SNS). Damjanović remained with the Radicals and led the party's assembly group in Stari Grad from 2008 to 2012.

In 2011, Damjanović took part in a protest against the extradition of Ratko Mladić to the International Criminal Tribunal for the Former Yugoslavia (ICTY). He was quoted as saying, "[His arrest] is an act of treason by the regime. It proved that this country is not free. He's a hero."

In the 2012 local elections, Damjanović received the twelfth position on the Radical Party's list at the city level in Belgrade and the second position on its list at the municipal level in Stari Grad. Weakened by the split four years earlier, the party fell below the electoral threshold for assembly representation in both contests. He later appeared in the seventeenth position on the party's list in 2014 Belgrade city assembly election; the party fell below the threshold in this election as well.

In 2015, Damjanović joined with SRS leader Vojislav Šešelj to burn a Croatian flag in front of the High Court in Belgrade. In a subsequent television interview, he said that the Radical Party would always support "burning the flag of the state that occupied the Serbian Krajina."

=== Parliamentarian (2016–20) ===
Damjanović appeared in the ninety-second position on the SRS's list in the 2012 Serbian parliamentary election and the thirty-first position in the 2014 parliamentary election. The SRS fell below the electoral threshold in both elections.

He was promoted to the eighth position on the party's list in the 2016 parliamentary election and was elected when the list won twenty-two seats. The Progressives and their allies won a majority victory, and the Radicals served in opposition for the term that followed. During his parliamentary term, Damjanović was a member of the finance committee (Note: Formally known as the Committee on Finance, State Budget, and Control of Public Spending.) and the committee on Kosovo-Metohija, a deputy member of the European integration committee and the European Union–Serbia stabilization and association committee, and a member of the parliamentary friendship groups with Belarus, China, Russia, and Venezuela.

Damjanović was the leader of the Radical Party's city organization in Belgrade in this period. In May 2016, he said that the Radicals would join a coalition government in Stari Grad led by their traditional ideological rivals in the Democratic Party (DS). This was later contradicted by the DS, which said that no formal agreement had been reached.

Damjanović announced in March 2017 that the Radical Party would send an international parliamentary delegation to Crimea to mark the three-year anniversary of the area's de facto joining of the Russian Federation.

Damjanović was the Radical Party's nominee for mayor of Belgrade in the 2018 city assembly election and appeared in the second position on the party's electoral list, behind Šešelj. (Note: Serbian mayors are not directly elected; Damjanović was technically the SRS's presumptive nominee for mayor in the event that the party won the election.) During the campaign, he called for the abolition of "anti-Serbian non-governmental organizations" and proposed building a monument to former Serbian president Slobodan Milošević. The party once again fell below the threshold for assembly representation. After the election, he said, "We will not give up our ideology. We will not change our program. [...] The people will decide if and when they will trust the SRS."

Damjanović appeared in the sixth position on the Radical Party's list in the 2020 parliamentary election and was not re-elected when the list fell below the electoral threshold.

=== Parliamentary Assembly of the Council of Europe (2016–21) ===
Damjanović was a substitute member of Serbia's delegation to the Parliamentary Assembly of the Council of Europe (PACE) from 2016 to 2021. For his entire term, he was an alternate delegate on the committee on social affairs, health, and sustainable development. He did not serve with any assembly grouping, except in the period from April to June 2019, when he was a member of the Free Democrats Group.

=== Since 2020 ===
Damjanović again appeared in the sixth position on the Radical Party's list in the 2022 parliamentary election and was promoted to the fifth position in 2023. On both occasions, the list fell below the electoral threshold.

In May 2022, Vojislav Šešelj received a summons to appear before the International Residual Mechanism for Criminal Tribunals (IRMCT; the successor body to the ICTY) to respond to charges concerning the publication of classified information and the names of protected witnesses. The summons also included the names of seven current and former Radical Party officials, including Damjanović. An indictment was later filed against Šešelj, Damjanović, and three other Radical Party officials on 11 August 2023. In late February 2024, the presiding justice transferred the case to Serbia for trial. The matter is ongoing. Damjanović has said that he was included in the indictment simply for making Šešelj's books about the ICTY available to the public.

In March 2024, Damjanović led a Radical Party delegation to a vigil at the grave of Slobodan Milošević.

The Radical Party contested the 2024 Belgrade city assembly election as part of an electoral alliance led by the Progressive Party. The alliance won a majority victory, and on 24 June 2024 Damjanović was appointed as a member of city council. In November 2024, he said that the city government would maintain its existing public timetable for public transportation and add more buses to the city's streets.
