= Serbian Radical Party =

Political party in Serbia

Serbian Radical Party Српска радикална странка
- Abbreviation: SRS
- President: Vojislav Šešelj
- Deputy President: Aleksandar Šešelj
- Vice-Presidents: Vjerica Radeta; Miljan Damjanović
- Founder: Vojislav Šešelj; Tomislav Nikolić
- Founded: 23 February 1991; 35 years ago
- Merger of: Serbian Chetnik Movement; People's Radical Party
- Headquarters: Magistratski trg 3, Belgrade
- Newspaper: Velika Srbija
- Armed wing: White Eagles (1991–1995)
- Ideology: Ultranationalism; Serbian irredentism; Right-wing populism; Russophilia; Neo-fascism
- Political position: Far-right
- National affiliation: United Serbia
- European affiliation: Alliance for Peace and Freedom (cooperation)
- Montenegrin counterpart: Party of Serb Radicals (1992–2021)
- Republika Srpska counterparts: SRS of Republika Srpska (1992–2004); SRS "9th January" (2004–2018)
- Colours: Blue
- Slogan: Srbija je večna dok su joj deca verna ('Serbia is eternal as long as its children are loyal')
- Anthem: "Sprem'te se sprem'te"
- National Assembly: 4 / 250
- City Assembly of Belgrade: 2 / 110
- Assembly of Vojvodina: 0 / 110

Party flag

Website
- srpskaradikalnastranka.org.rs

The Serbian Radical Party (Serbian: Српска радикална странка, romanised: Srpska radikalna stranka, abbr. SRS) is a far-right ultranationalist political party in Serbia. Founded in 1991, its co-founder, first and only leader is Vojislav Šešelj. During the Yugoslav Wars, it became prominent, enjoying the status of the second largest party in the Serbian parliament under the regime of Slobodan Milošević. In this period and in the following decade, it had been described as neo-fascist.

The SRS was founded in 1991 as a merger of the Serbian Chetnik Movement, led by Šešelj, and the People's Radical Party, led by Tomislav Nikolić. Upon formation, they became the president and deputy president of SRS respectively. During the first half of the 1990s the SRS supported the ruling Socialist Party of Serbia regime led by Milošević, which had contributed greatly to the rise of SRS through the use of media. The SRS was endorsed by Milošević and collaborated with him as a part of his coalition; later it experienced persecution for competing with him and then a reconciliation, with Milošević making Šešelj his Deputy Prime Minister. The party had strong support until the 2000 election, when SRS suffered a major defeat, but through populist rhetoric it became the most voted party in the early-to-mid 2000s. Šešelj voluntarily surrendered to the ICTY to defend himself against charges of war crimes and crimes against humanity that he was alleged to have committed during the Croatian War of Independence and the Bosnian War. Nikolić assumed de facto party leadership until he left the party in 2008.

During the years of Nikolić's leadership, SRS blended ultranationalism with brash, populist, and anti-corruption rhetoric. Due to disagreements with Šešelj over European Union integration, Nikolić took many of the high-ranking members of the party to form the Serbian Progressive Party (SNS), which became the ruling party of Serbia in 2012. After the split, Dragan Todorović assumed de facto leadership, and the party went into a major decline, winning only 4.8% of the vote in 2012, when it failed to enter parliament for the first time, and 2.1% in 2014. Shortly after Šešelj's return to Serbia in 2014, the party gained back some of its popularity and it placed third with 8% of the vote in the 2016 election. In late 2019, the party went into decline again, and in the 2020 election it won only 2% of the vote and lost its seats; it also failed to win seats in 2022 and 2023. After allying with SNS in the 2023 and 2024 Belgrade elections, the SRS contested the 2026 parliamentary election on the SNS-led "Aleksandar Vučić – United Serbia" list, on which four of its members were elected, returning the party to the National Assembly.

A right-wing populist party, SRS supports the creation of a Greater Serbia. It is Eurosceptic, anti-Western orientated, opposed to the accession of Serbia to the European Union and supports establishing closer ties with Russia instead. Some journalists described SRS as neo-fascist in the 1990s; this definition of the party is met in scholarly and academic materials written in the 1990s and the 2000s or describing the party in that period. Regarding social issues, SRS is traditionalist. It also holds local branches in some of the neighbouring states.

== Ideology ==
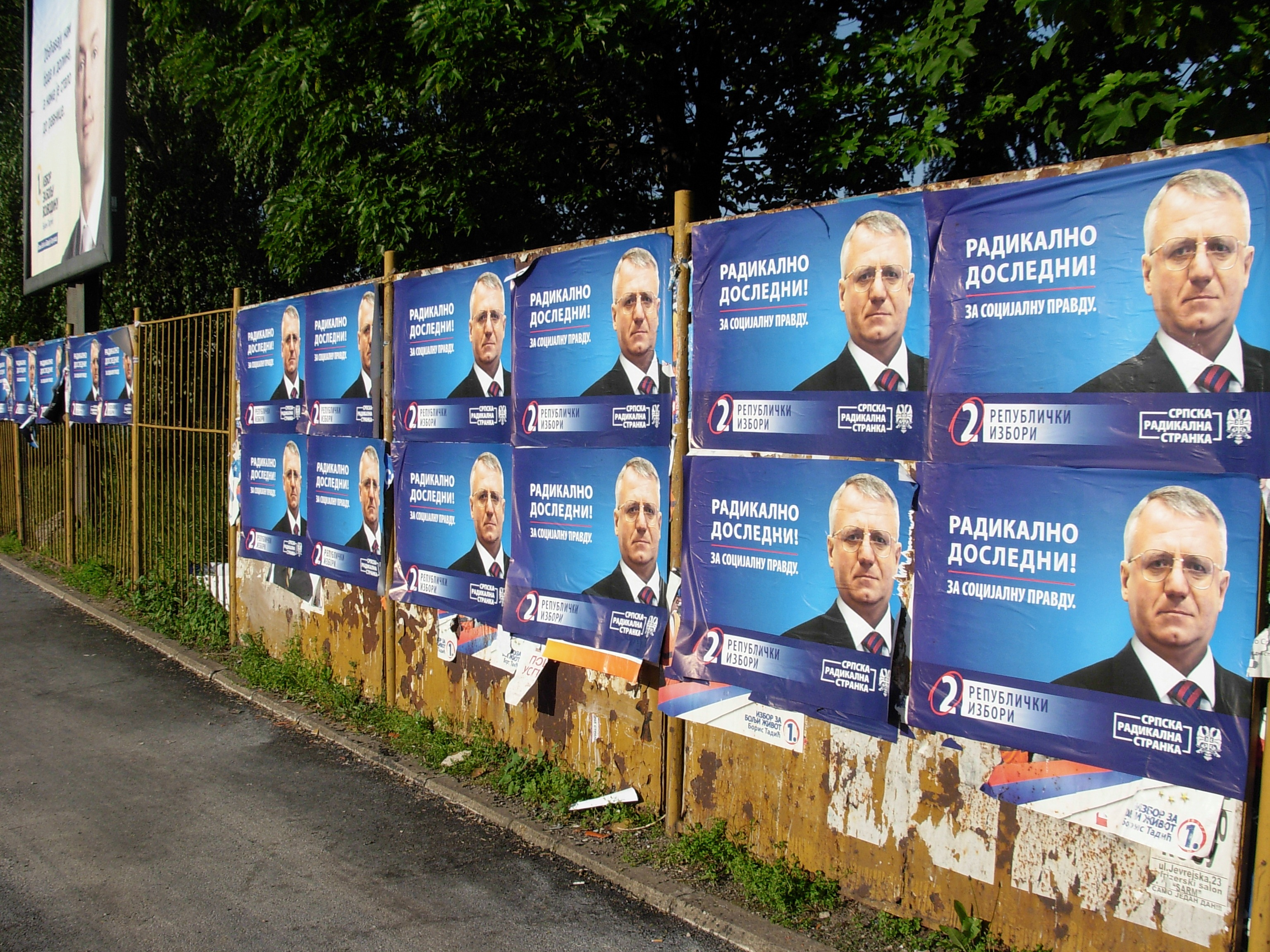
Vojislav Šešelj, president of the Serbian Radical Party, is one of the staunchest advocates of Greater Serbia.

The party's core ideology is based on Serbian nationalism and the goal of creating a Greater Serbia. The party is also strongly opposed to European integration (euroscepticism) and globalisation, advocating closer ties with Russia instead. The SRS is extremely critical of the International Criminal Tribunal for the former Yugoslavia (ICTY), where Šešelj was incarcerated from 2003 to 2014. The party regards former general Ratko Mladić and former Republika Srpska president Radovan Karadžić as "Serbian heroes".

In 2007, the party advocated the use of military force to prevent the independence of Kosovo.

Due to Tomislav Nikolić's support for the accession of Serbia to the European Union conflicting with the party's original hardline policy, Nikolić was expelled in 2008. With his supporters breaking apart from the SRS, he founded the Serbian Progressive Party (SNS) which succeeded the SRS as one of the country's leading parties.

In the Parliamentary Assembly of the Council of Europe, SRS was briefly associated with the Free Democrats Group in 2019.

== History ==
=== Foundation ===
The symbol of the Serbian Radical Party

The Serbian Radical Party (SRS) was formed on 23 February 1991 by the merger of Vojislav Šešelj's Serbian Chetnik Movement (SČP) and the People's Radical Party (NRS). The SČP had been formed in 1990, although it was denied official registration due to its overt identification with the historical Chetniks. Formation of the new party followed Šešelj's breakaway from the Serbian Renewal Movement (SPO) due to internal quarrels with Vuk Drašković; the SPO having been founded by the merger of Šešelj's former Serbian Freedom Movement and Drašković's faction from the Serbian National Renewal. Šešelj was chosen as the first president of the SRS while Tomislav Nikolić, a member of the NRS, became deputy president.

=== Rise under SPS ===
Led by Milošević, the Socialist Party (SPS) contributed greatly to the rise of the SRS through its use of the media. With the SRS allowed to promulgate its ultranationalist views on state television, the SPS could present itself as a comparatively moderate, yet still patriotic party. Šešelj promoted popular notions of an "international conspiracy against the Serbs," the foremost of which involved Germany, the Vatican, the CIA, Italy, Turkey, as well as the centrist Serbian political parties. Such conspiracy theories were also promoted by Milošević-controlled media. In 1991, Šešelj became a Member of Parliament as an independent candidate, and created a belligerent image by engaging in physical fights with opponents of the government.

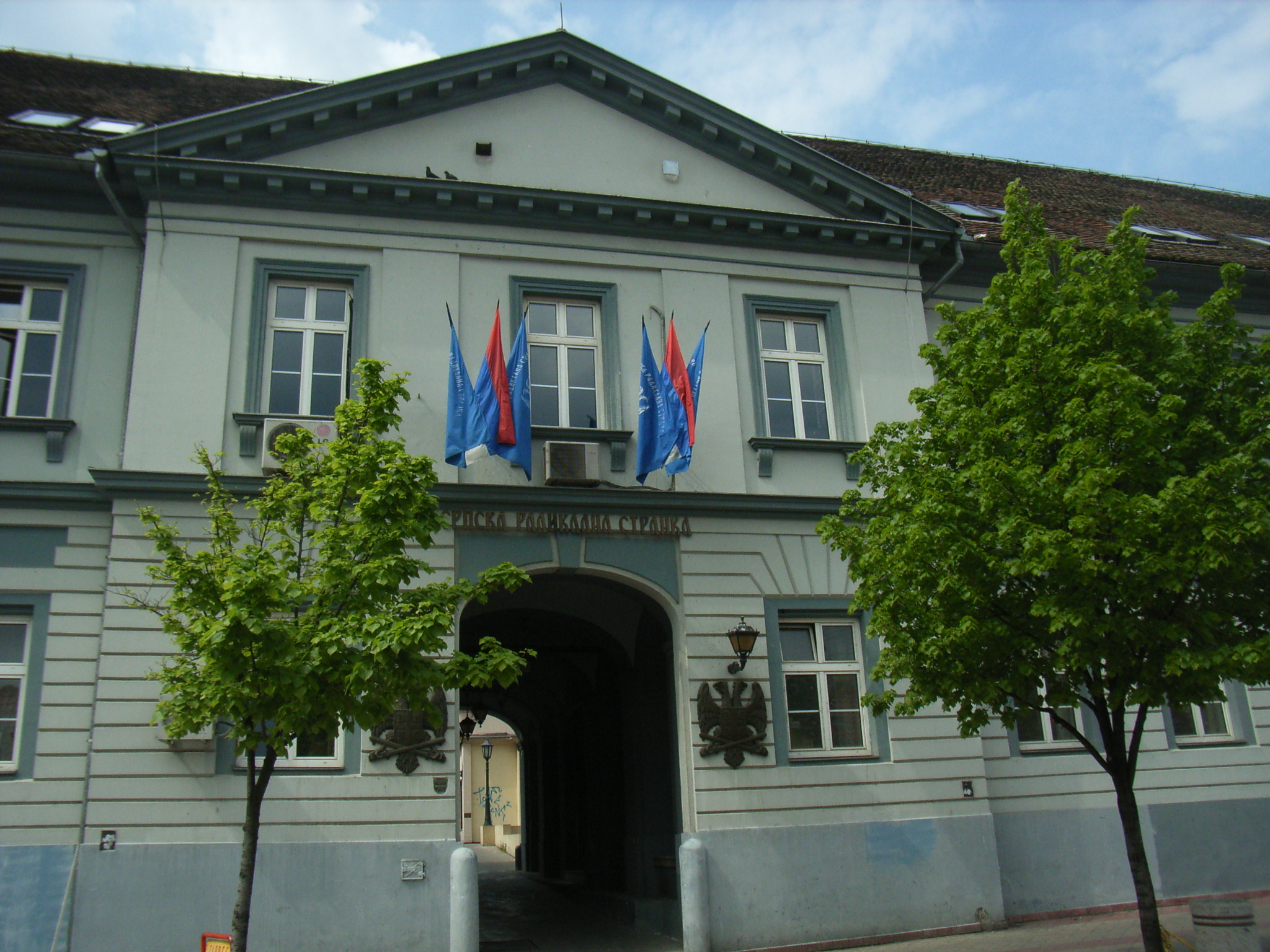
The Serbian Radical Party headquarters in Zemun, Belgrade

The 22.6% of the vote won by the SRS in the 1992 parliamentary election confirmed the party's rapid rise and made it the second largest parliamentary party. Šešelj campaigned for the election on issues such as driving Albanians out of Kosovo to Albania, expelling Muslims from Sandžak, and forcing the Croats out of Vojvodina. Having helped engineer the party's election to parliament, the SPS formed an informal coalition with the SRS, and collaborated on ousting moderate politicians from public office.

=== Milošević breaks with SRS ===
By late 1993 the parties had turned against each other. Milošević saw it necessary to change his policies and distance himself from the SRS in order for his new peacemaking orientation to be taken seriously by the West, as well as to counter the effects of United Nations sanctions against the country. Many SPS party members also feared competition from the SRS based on its strong growth record. As discord erupted among the opposition including the SRS, Milošević called new elections in 1993. These cut SRS support almost in half, while the SPS increased its share of the vote from 28% to 38%. Although most people had grown tired of the wars, UN sanctions and the catastrophic economic situation, the SRS had also been subjected to powerful state propaganda and exclusion by the media. Following Milošević's agreement to the Dayton accords in 1995 to bring peace to Bosnia, Šešelj denounced Milošević as "the worst traitor in Serbian history", and likened the event to Serbia's greatest defeat since the Battle of Kosovo fought against the Ottoman Empire in 1389.

In 1995, Šešelj and the SRS joined in a technical coalition with the centrist Democratic Party (DS) and the conservative Democratic Party of Serbia (DSS). This gave Šešelj a degree of democratic legitimacy, although the coalition withered away by the end of the same year.

=== Kosovo war and Milošević's overthrow ===
When Šešelj beat the SPS candidate for the 1997 presidential election, despite the contest being declared invalid due to low turnout, he was again brought into the Serbian government. In 1998 the SRS and SPO entered the so-called "war" government, and as Deputy Prime Minister, Šešelj passed new information laws and helped launch propaganda offensives against Kosovo Albanians. U.S. officials in turn branded him a "fascist", while the U.S. Department of State declared that they would never deal with him. Following the 1999 NATO occupation of Kosovo, Šešelj resigned from government until his party was enticed to re-enter the administration by the SPS. As the party had held posts under Milošević's regime, it was excluded from the Democratic Opposition of Serbia (DOS), and suffered a major defeat in the 2000 parliamentary election when Milošević was ousted.

=== Indictment of Šešelj ===
During the Yugoslav Wars some SRS supporters including Šešelj were active in paramilitary units loyal to the federal government, serving as his "iron fist" during military campaigns. Milošević's regime at times supported Šešelj and provided him with arms, whilst at others it accused him of war crimes. The SRS was also provided with resources to establish paramilitary volunteer forces such as the White Eagles. As the SRS protested against Milošević's extradition to the International Criminal Tribunal for the former Yugoslavia (ICTY) in 2001, Milošević urged his supporters to vote for the SRS rather than his own SPS. The ICTY also indicted Šešelj, who has been on trial since 2007 following his surrender in 2003. Deputy President Nikolić became the new de facto SRS leader and presented a more moderate face, with a new approach to international cooperation and a vision of Serbia acting as a "link between the West and the East."

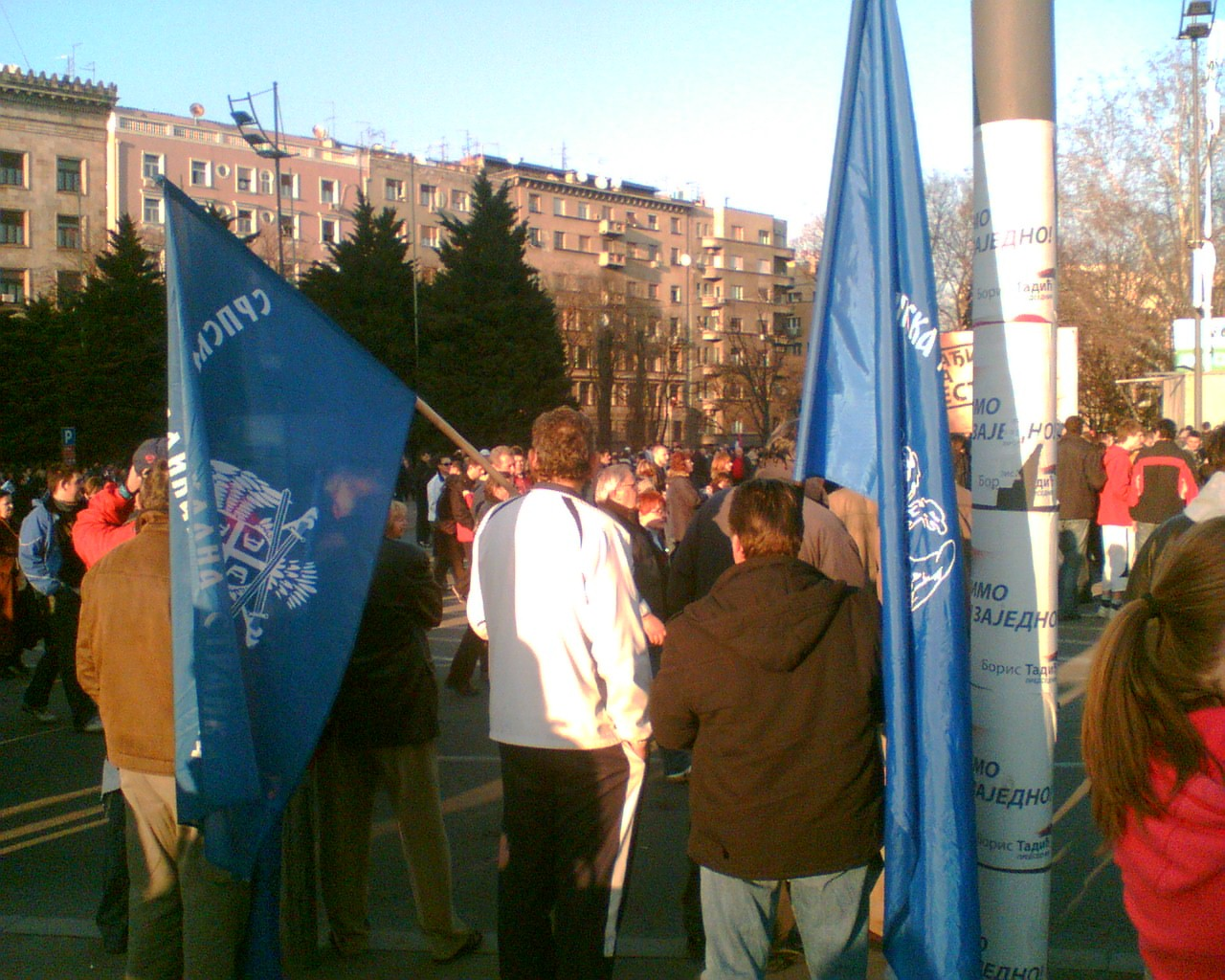
SRS supporters demonstrating against Kosovo's declaration of independence, Belgrade, 2008

=== Nikolić leadership ===
During the 2003 parliamentary election, the SRS condemned cooperation with the war crimes tribunal, corruption scandals in government, poor living standards, and slightly moderated its formerly aggressive rhetoric. While it won a clear plurality with 28% of the vote and 82 seats, the party was still viewed as a pariah by its democratic rivals and was thus left in opposition. In the 2007 parliamentary election it won 29% of the vote and 81 seats. The SRS caucus in parliament elected Nikolić as its president and Aleksandar Vučić vice-president. Nikolić was later chosen as parliamentary speaker, supported by the DSS amidst a deadlock in coalition talks. He stepped down just five days later, as the DS and DSS agreed to form a coalition government.

At the National Assembly's first session on 14 February 2007, politicians voted overwhelmingly to reject the proposal by UN Special Envoy Martti Ahtisaari on the preliminary resolution of the status of Kosovo. New elections were called in 2008 as the DS-DSS coalition collapsed due to EU recognition of Kosovo's declaration of independence. In the 2008 parliamentary election the SRS again won 29% of the vote, and 78 seats, leading to the formation of a DS-SPS-led government coalition. The party also won 17 seats in the Kosovska Mitrovica-based Community Assembly of Kosovo and Metohija consisting of Kosovan Serb municipalities who defied Kosovo's declaration of independence.

=== 2008 split ===
After disagreements with Šešelj, on 8 September 2008, Nikolić formed the new parliamentary group Napred Srbijo! ("Forward Serbia!") along with a number of other SRS members. Šešelj responded with a letter on 11 September addressed to SRS members, in which he condemned the Nikolić group as "traitors" and "Western puppets", while calling on SRS members to remain loyal to the ideologies of "Serbian nationalism, anti-globalism, and Russophilia." Nikolić and his group were officially expelled from the SRS the next day, in response to which Nikolić announced that he would form his own party. On 14 September, SRS general secretary Aleksandar Vučić also resigned from the SRS. Nikolić and Vučić then launched the Serbian Progressive Party (SNS) on 21 October of the same year.

Following their departure, Dragan Todorović took over as the party's acting leader from Nikolić; however the office of deputy chairman was officially abolished. By April 2011 the SRS had about 7% of support in opinion polls, while the SNS and its coalition partners held about 40%. In the 2012 parliamentary election the Radical Party received only 4.83% of the popular vote, thus failing to cross the 5% threshold to enter parliament for the first time in the party's history.

=== Šešelj's return and alliance with SNS (2014–present) ===
With their leader back in Serbia in 2014, the party campaigned for the parliamentary election of 2016 aiming to restore its presence prior to 2008. It received 8.34% of the vote and won 22 seats. In the 2020 parliamentary election, the SRS received 2.13% of the vote, failing to cross the newly lowered 3% threshold, and lost all its seats. It also failed to cross the threshold in the 2022 (2.22%) and 2023 (1.50%) elections.

The party formed an alliance with the ruling Serbian Progressive Party to contest the 2023 Belgrade City Assembly election. This announcement caused attention in national media. In the 2024 Belgrade City Assembly election, the party gained 2 seats whilst being with the ruling SNS coalition. During the 2024 local election, the SRS cooperated with the SNS coalition.

In June 2026, Šešelj said that he was open to running in the next presidential election, subject to approval by the party's Central Fatherland Administration. On 6 September 2026, the Central Fatherland Administration decided that the SRS would contest the 2026 snap parliamentary election on the SNS-led "Aleksandar Vučić – United Serbia" list, and backed Aleksandar Vučić as prime minister. Aleksandar Šešelj, the party's deputy president, was 37th on the list, which won 1,731,323 votes (39.48%) and 103 seats, losing the election to the Student List. Four SRS members were elected: Aleksandar Šešelj, Vjerica Radeta, Marina Nedeljković and Dejan Marinković. Their mandates were confirmed at the constitutive sitting of the 15th National Assembly on 17 November 2026, and they joined the "Aleksandar Vučić – Serbia is Winning" parliamentary group led by Vučić.

== International relations ==
The Serbian Radical Party maintains ties with the Liberal Democratic Party of Russia and had ties with the French National Front party in the 1990s. The SRS also has minimal ties with the far-right Golden Dawn party in Greece, focusing on religious similarities, and the Forza Nuova party in Italy.

The party counted Iraq's Saddam Hussein and the Arab Socialist Ba'ath Party as one of its political and financial backers until the 2003 invasion of Iraq, as the parties found common cause in defiance of the United States. Similar sentiment led the party to back Libya's Muammar Gaddafi following the 2011 military intervention in Libya by NATO. Serbia and Libya had maintained good relations since Gaddafi vocally opposed NATO intervention in Serbia in the 1990s, while he also backed Serbia's opposition to Kosovo's independence. The SRS has also expressed support for Syrian president Bashar al-Assad following the Syrian Civil War. Šešelj advocates for a neutral position on the Israel-Palestine conflict, balancing Serbia's strong relations with both countries.

On 9 March 2016, Šešelj and Zmago Jelinčič, president of the Slovenian National Party, signed an agreement with the intention of bringing their parties closer in terms of partnership and political alliance.

== List of presidents ==
#	President		Birth–Death	Term start	Term end
1	Vojislav Šešelj (Note: Incarcerated at the ICTY from 24 February 2003 until 12 November 2014)	A photo of Vojislav Šešelj from 2020	1954–	23 February 1991	Incumbent

=== Acting leaders during the incarceration of Šešelj ===
Šešelj was incarcerated at the International Criminal Tribunal for the former Yugoslavia (ICTY) from 2003 to 2014.

#	Name		Birth–Death	Term start	Term end
1	Tomislav Nikolić (Note: Deputy President)	A photo of Tomislav Nikolić from 2012	1952–	24 February 2003	5 September 2008
2	Dragan Todorović (Note: Vice President)	A photo of Dragan Todorović from 2013	1953–	5 September 2008	26 May 2012
3	Nemanja Šarović	A photo of Nemanja Šarović from 2011	1974–	26 May 2012	12 November 2014

== Electoral performance ==
=== Parliamentary elections ===
National Assembly
Year	Leader	Popular vote	% of popular vote	#	# of seats	Seat change	Coalition	Status	Ref.
1992	Vojislav Šešelj	1,066,765	24.04%	2nd	73 / 250	New	—	Support	
1993	Vojislav Šešelj	595,467	14.43%	▼3rd	39 / 250	▼34	—	Opposition	
1997	Vojislav Šešelj	1,162,216	29.26%	▲2nd	82 / 250	▲43	—	Government	
2000	Vojislav Šešelj	322,333	8.81%	▼3rd	23 / 250	▼59	—	Opposition	
2003	Vojislav Šešelj	1,069,212	27.98%	▲1st	82 / 250	▲59	—	Opposition	
2007	Vojislav Šešelj	1,153,453	29.07%	1st	81 / 250	▼1	—	Opposition	
2008	Vojislav Šešelj	1,219,436	30.10%	▼2nd	78 / 250	▼3	—	Opposition	
2012	Vojislav Šešelj	180,558	4.83%	▼7th	0 / 250	▼78	—	Extra-parliamentary	
2014	Vojislav Šešelj	72,303	2.08%	▼11th	0 / 250	0	—	Extra-parliamentary	
2016	Vojislav Šešelj	306,052	8.34%	▲3rd	22 / 250	▲22	—	Opposition	
2020	Vojislav Šešelj	65,954	2.13%	▼8th	0 / 250	▼22	—	Extra-parliamentary	
2022	Vojislav Šešelj	82,066	2.22%	▼9th	0 / 250	0	—	Extra-parliamentary	
2023	Vojislav Šešelj	55,782	1.50%	▲8th	0 / 250	0	—	Extra-parliamentary	
2026	Vojislav Šešelj	1,731,323	39.48%	▲2nd	4 / 250	▲4	AV–US	Opposition	

=== Presidential elections ===
President of Serbia
Year	Candidate	1st round popular vote		% of popular vote	2nd round popular vote		% of popular vote	Notes	Ref.
1992	Slobodan Milošević	1st	2,515,047	57.46%	—N/a	—	—	Supported Milošević	
Sep 1997	Vojislav Šešelj	2nd	1,126,940	28.36%	1st	1,733,859	50.62%	Election annulled due to low turnout	
Dec 1997	Vojislav Šešelj	2nd	1,227,076	32.87%	2nd	1,383,868	38.81%		
Sep–Oct 2002	Vojislav Šešelj	3rd	845,308	23.74%	—N/a	—	—	Election annulled due to low turnout	
Dec 2002	Vojislav Šešelj	2nd	1,063,296	37.10%	—N/a	—	—	Election annulled due to low turnout	
2003	Tomislav Nikolić	1st	1,166,896	47.87%	—N/a	—	—	Election annulled due to low turnout	
2004	Tomislav Nikolić	1st	954,339	30.97%	2nd	1,434,068	46.03%		
2008	Tomislav Nikolić	1st	1,646,172	40.76%	2nd	2,197,155	48.81%		
2012	Jadranka Šešelj	7th	147,793	3.96%	—N/a	—	—		
2017	Vojislav Šešelj	5th	163,802	4.56%	—N/a	—	—		
2022	Aleksandar Vučić	1st	2,224,914	60.01%	—N/a	—	—	Supported Vučić	

== See also ==
- Serbian nationalism
- Greater Serbia
- Party of Serb Radicals
- Serbian Radical Party "9th January"
- Serbian Radical Party of the Republika Srpska

== Bibliography ==
- Bakić, Jovo (2009). "Extreme-right ideology, practice and supporters: case study of the Serbian Radical Party". Journal of Contemporary European Studies. 17 (2): 193–207. doi:10.1080/14782800903108643. S2CID 153453439.
- Bugajski, Janusz (2002). "Serbian Radical Party (SRP)". Political parties of Eastern Europe: a guide to politics in the post-Communist era. M.E. Sharpe. pp. 415–417. ISBN 978-1-56324-676-0.
- Konitzer, Andrew (2008). "The Serbian radical party in the 2004 local elections". East European Politics & Societies. 22 (4): 738–756. doi:10.1177/0888325408316528. S2CID 145777191.
- Lazić, Mladen; Vuletić, Vladimir (2009). "The nation state and the EU in the perceptions of political and economic elites: The case of Serbia in comparative perspective". Europe-Asia Studies. 61 (6): 987–1001. doi:10.1080/09668130903063518. S2CID 154590974.
- Nagradić, Slobodan (1995). Neka istorija sudi: razgovori sa liderima Srpske radikalne stranke. VIKOM. ISBN 9788679970053.
- Pribićević, Ognjen (1999). "Changing Fortunes of the Serbian Radical Right". In Ramet, Sabrina P. (ed.). The radical right in Central and Eastern Europe since 1989. Penn State. pp. 193–212. ISBN 978-0-271-01811-9.
- Samardzija, Anita; Robertson, Shanthi (2012). "Contradictory populism online: Nationalist and globalist discourses of the Serbian Radical Party's websites". Communication, Politics & Culture. 45 (1): 96.
- Stojarová, Vera (2016). The far right in the Balkans. Manchester University Press. pp. 5, 22, 35, 40, 48–50, 55–57, 64–65, 73, 82–83, 103–104, 106–112, 119, 152–155. ISBN 978-1-5261-1203-3.
- Thomas, Robert (1999). Serbia Under Milošević: Politics in the 1990s. C. Hurst & Co. Publishers. ISBN 978-1-85065-341-7.
