= Battle of Foča =

1992 Bosnian War battle

- Part of the Bosnian War
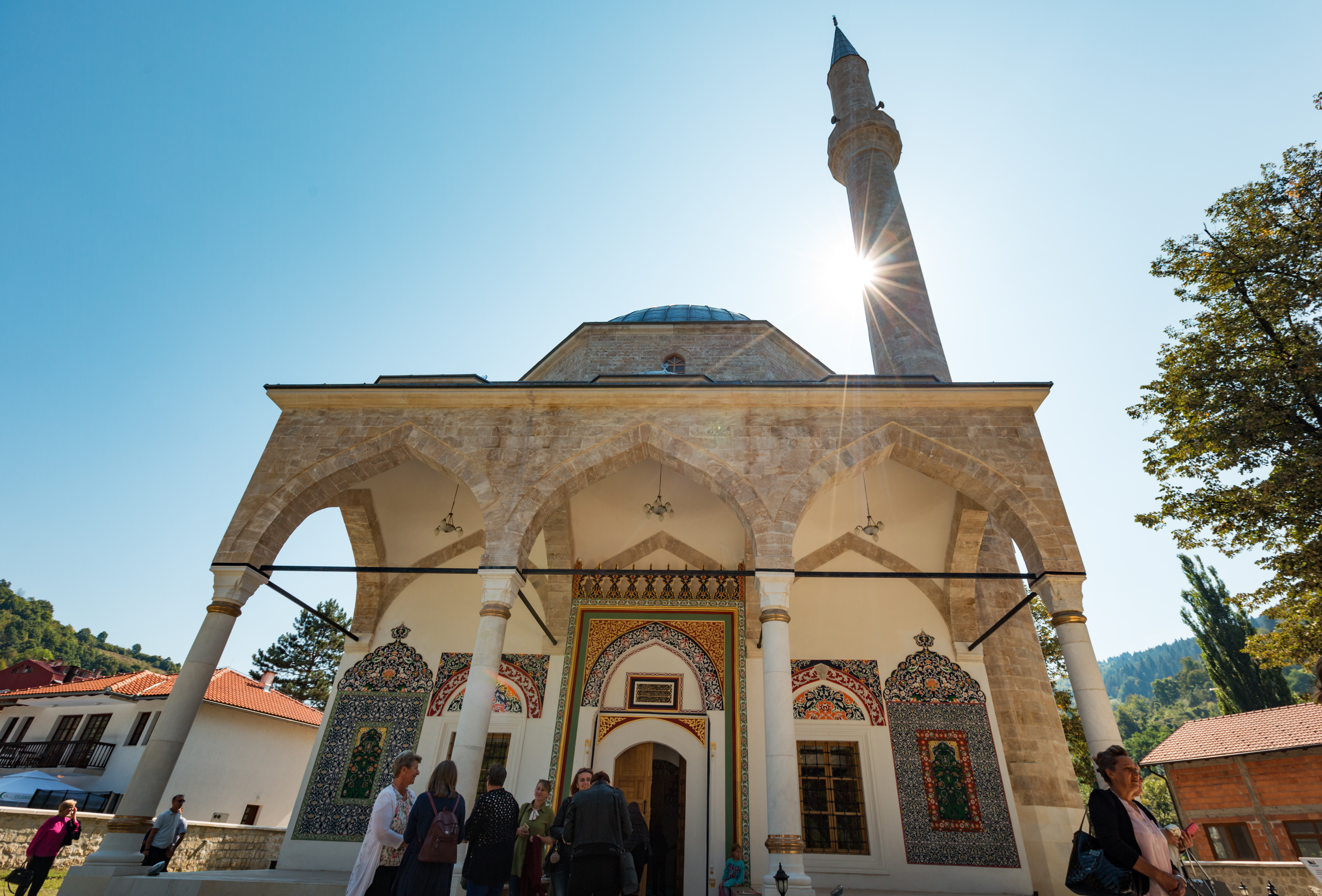
- Reconstructed Aladža mosque; all mosques in the town were damaged or destroyed during the battle
Date	8 - 17 April 1992
Location	Foča, Bosnia and Herzegovina
Result	Yugoslav People's Army victory
Territorial changes	Strategic point of Foča captured by Serb forces

Belligerents
SFR Yugoslavia; Republika Srpska	Republic of Bosnia and Herzegovina

Commanders and leaders
Momir Bulatović; Vojislav Šešelj; Željko Ražnatović	Unknown

Units involved
Yugoslav People's Army; Republic of Montenegro Territorial Defense; Police of Republika Srpska; White Eagles; Serb Volunteer Guard	Territorial Defense of Bosnia and Herzegovina; Patriotic League

Strength
1,000 soldiers 150 policemen	1,000 soldiers

Casualties and losses
12 killed	Unknown

The Battle of Foča was an armed conflict between the Yugoslav People's Army (JNA) and Bosnian Serb forces against the Territorial Defence Force of the Republic of Bosnia and Herzegovina (TORBiH) for control of the town of Foča in eastern Bosnia and Herzegovina. Lasting from 8 to 17 April 1992, it was one of the opening engagements of the Bosnian War.

Local Bosnian Serb members of the Territorial Defense and police, heavily supported by JNA units from the 37th Užice Corps and Montenegrin Territorial Defense, launched an offensive that overcame the local Bosnian Muslim (Bosniak) police and Patriotic League elements. The capture of Foča allowed Serb forces to secure a strategic link in the Drina Valley, connecting Serbian-held territories in eastern Bosnia with the Federal Republic of Yugoslavia.

Following the fall of the town, Bosnian Serb forces and paramilitaries, including the White Eagles and the Serb Volunteer Guard, conducted a systematic campaign of ethnic cleansing and mass violence against the Bosniak civilian population. This included mass killings, the destruction of cultural heritage sites—notably the Aladža Mosque—and the establishment of "rape camps" where Bosniak women were subjected to systematic sexual violence. Several high-ranking political and military figures were later convicted by the International Criminal Tribunal for the former Yugoslavia (ICTY) and the International Residual Mechanism for Criminal Tribunals for crimes against humanity and war crimes committed during and after the battle.

== Background ==
Located 20 km southwest of Goražde, Foča is located on an important strategic route that runs from north to south along the entire Drina Valley. The ethnic population is roughly divided (52% Muslims and 45% Serbs). There have been major escalations of interethnic contradictions here, as in all of Bosnia in March. After a series of incidents, on 23 March, the local SDS crisis headquarters announced a "state of readiness". This step was primarily prompted by news of growing pressure on the Serbian minority in Goražde.

Police of Republika Srpska was formed on 4 April 1992. The Serbian forces in Foča and the surrounding area consisted mainly of Territorial Defense fighters (about 1,000 men), combined TO detachments from Montenegro and neighbouring municipalities (for example from Čajniče), and 200 local police officers who had recently joined the newly formed Serbian Ministry of the Interior. Subsequently, in the final phase of the battle for the city, volunteers from Vojislav Šešelj's ''White Eagles" joined. Limited support was provided by units of the 37th Užice Corps of the JNA.

The Muslim forces in Foča numbered approximately a thousand SDA paramilitary soldiers. They were the most organized and well-armed Muslim forces in eastern Bosnia, excluding the Goražde fighters. Unlike Bijeljina, Zvornik, and Višegrad, where the Serbs established control in a day or two, the fighting for Foča lasted almost 2 weeks.

== Battle ==
When Bosnia and Herzegovina formally declared independence on 6 April, on the same day Serbs from Foča took control of the main municipal buildings, including the police station, and declared their affiliation with Republika Srpska and independence from the government in Sarajevo. Fighting that began in the city on the evening of 8 April, moved to the hydroelectric power plant area on 9 April, and as in Zvornik, the Serbs issued an ultimatum, demanding the TORBiH lay down their weapons. They ignored it, and that evening Serb fighters began shelling the city with Howitzers. The fighting took place in the predominantly Muslim suburbs (Donje Polje, Aladža).

Full control of Foča came on 14 April, when Serbian forces managed to drive Muslim snipers out of the skyscrapers (from which Muslim snipers controlled the entire city) with concentrated artillery fire. After the fall of the settlement of Donje Polje, where the strongest resistance was offered, the Muslim defenses began to collapse, and by 17 April most of the Muslim forces had abandoned the city, including a large part of the civilian population.

The capture of Foča was a major success for the Serbs in their offensive in Podrinje, but battles still had to be fought with sabotage by several Muslim groups scattered throughout the city. It was not until late July that Serbian fighters managed to fully secure the area, following this many crimes against Muslims and Croats were committed by forces under command of Arkan and Vojislav Šešelj.

In the following days, two VRS tactical groups were formed in Višegrad and Foča, which actively participated in the battles for the Trnovo-Goražde corridor, which the Muslims were trying to establish. The fighting in Podrinje in 1992 spread to the triangle between Rogatica, Višegrad and Goražde, along both banks of the Drina.

== Mass murders in Foča ==
The Gornja Josanica massacre took place in December 1992. The Višegrad Brigade of the Army of the Republic of Bosnia and Herzegovina committed a war crime against Serbs, mostly civilians, in the village of Gornja Jošanica near Foča. 56 villagers were killed, many of them in a gruesome manner, by cutting off body parts. Among the victims were 21 women and three children, who had come from Foča the previous day with their parents to celebrate St. Nicholas Day in the village. About a dozen hamlets of Gornja Jošanica in the municipality of Foča were wiped off the map, not only houses but also auxiliary buildings were burned down, along with the weak, livestock were also killed, and where they managed to do so, the criminals even cut down fruit trees.

The VRS also committed serious and brutal crimes including killings, mass rapes, and the deliberate destruction of Bosniak property and cultural sites in a campaign of ethnic cleansing, with 2,707 deaths and over 21,000 Bosniak Muslims being displaced.
