= Gornja Jošanica massacre =

Massacre occurred in village Gornja Josanica, Bosnia

- Part of Bosnian War
- Jošanica (Bosnia and Herzegovina)
- Location: 43°33′22″N 18°50′04″E; Jošanica, Foča, Bosnia and Herzegovina
- Date: 19 December 1992
- Target: Serb civilians
- Deaths: 56 (21 women, three children)
- Injuries: 11
- Perpetrator: Army of the Republic of Bosnia and Herzegovina

Gornja Jošanica massacre was the mass murder in the village of Gornja Jošanica, near Foča in eastern Bosnia, where 56 Bosnian Serb civilians were killed during an attack by the Army of the Republic of Bosnia and Herzegovina (ARBiH) from 19 December 1992, on St. Nicolas Day.

On 19 December 1992, Bosniak soldiers attacked the village of Gornja Jošanica, where about 600 members of the ARBiH took part in the attack, in ten groups deployed to ten other Jošanica hamlets, which were wiped out.

The victims of the massacre included 21 women who were killed, and three children: 10-year-old Dragana Višnjić, her 3-years younger baby brother Dražen and 2-year-old Danka Tanović. Victims were stabbed multiple times, had their throats slit and body parts mutilated. Some of the victims were tied up with wire and had their hands, feet, and skulls crushed with blunt objects.

In 2012, the case was transferred to the District Public Prosecution in Trebinje which was said to be developing a case against 60 people.

Witnesses to the tragedy claimed that Zaim Imamović, the former Bosnian commander was responsible for the 56 deaths in addition to burning 250 houses, an Orthodox church, and a cemetery.

== See also ==
- Foča ethnic cleansing
- List of massacres in the Bosnian War
