= Battle of Karuše =

1993 battle during the Bosnian War

Battle of Karuša
- Part of the Bosnian War
Date	19–22 March 1993
Location	Karuša, near Doboj, Bosnia and Herzegovina
Result	ARBiH victory

Belligerents
Republic of Bosnia and Herzegovina	Republika Srpska

Commanders and leaders
(Republic of Bosnia and Herzegovina) Mustafa Cerovac	(Republika Srpska) Slavko Lisica (Republika Srpska) Vojislav Šešelj

Units involved
Army of the Republic of Bosnia and Herzegovina; 2nd Corps; 203rd Motorized Brigade	Army of Republika Srpska; 1st Krajina Corps; Operative Group Doboj; White Eagles

Strength
Unknown	Unknown number of Soldiers, 10 tanks and 5 armored transporters

Casualties and losses
6 Soldiers killed	Around 140 killed; 11 tanks & transporters destroyed

The Battle of Karuša (Bosnian: Bitka na Karušama), also locally known as the “Tank Graveyard of Karuša” (Groblje Tenkova Karuše), was a battle fought during the Bosnian War from 19 to 22 March 1993 at Karuša, near Doboj in Bosnia and Herzegovina. It involved the ARBiH defending against an offensive by the VRS. The engagement ended in an ARBiH defense victory, halting the VRS attack and forcing their withdrawal.

== Background ==
In early 1993 the VRS had established control over Doboj and repeatedly attempted to capture surrounding areas held by the ARBiH. Karuša, located just south of Doboj near the confluence of the Usora and Bosna rivers, was a strategically significant point. The VRS offensive was part of a broader operation aiming to link Doboj, Teslić, Maglaj, and surrounding territory under Serb control. Alija Izetbegovic mentioned that this battle had a big importance for ARBiH

== Offensive and Battle ==
On 19 March 1993, VRS forces began an offensive operation, reportedly codenamed “Posljednja šansa” (“Last Chance”), aiming to break ARBiH lines and advance from the Doboj area into surrounding regions. The attacking force initially included mechanized units with tanks and armored personnel carriers.

According to several local sources, the ARBiH defenders including elements of the 203rd Motorized Brigade “Doboj-Bosna” and associated units managed to hold their positions and obstruct the advance of VRS armor. They reportedly inflicted significant losses on the attacking forces’ tanks and armored vehicles. After three days of fighting, the VRS attack was repelled and its forces withdrew.

== See also ==
- Bosnian War
- Battle of Travnik (1993)
- Battle of Žepče
