= White Eagles (paramilitary) =

Serbian paramilitary group

- Бели орлови
- Coat-of-arms of the White Eagles
- Active: 1991–1999
- Allegiance: FR Yugoslavia; Serbian Krajina; Republika Srpska
- Branch: Paramilitary
- Role: Counterinsurgency; Raiding; Urban warfare Patrolling
- Nicknames: Avengers (Osvetnici); Šešelj's men (Šešeljevci)
- Colours: Red; Blue; White
- Engagements: Croatian War of Independence; 1991 Yugoslav campaign in Croatia; Battle of Borovo Selo; Battle of Vukovar; Battle of Rosinjača; Voćin massacre; Operation Steel '93; Bosnian War; 1992 Yugoslav campaign in Bosnia; Bijeljina massacre; Battle of Foča; Seizure of Višegrad (1992); Zvornik massacre; Doboj massacre; Siege of Goražde; Battle of Karuše; Štrpci massacre; Kosovo War

Commanders
- Political Leader: Vojislav Šešelj
- 1st Commander: Mirko Jović
- 2nd Commander: Dragoslav Bokan

Insignia
- Patch

The White Eagles, nicknamed the Avengers (Serbian: Осветници, Osvetnici) or the Chetniks (Serbian: Четници, Četnici), were a Serbian paramilitary group associated with the Serbian National Renewal (SNO) and the Serbian Radical Party (SRS). The White Eagles fought in Croatia, Bosnia and Herzegovina and Kosovo during the Yugoslav Wars.

In the 2003 Vojislav Šešelj indictment from the International Criminal Tribunal for the former Yugoslavia, the group is included as an alleged party in a joint criminal enterprise of ethnic cleansing, in which SRS leader Šešelj allegedly took part. In the indictment the group is identified as "volunteer units including 'Chetniks', or Šešeljevci" (Serbian Cyrillic: Шешељевци). This association was denied by Šešelj. On 31 March 2016, he was acquitted in a first-instance verdict on all counts by the ICTY, a ruling which still holds today, barring an unrelated conviction from its successor (International Residual Mechanism for Criminal Tribunals) for instigating deportation of Croats from the Serbian village of Hrtkovci.

== Name ==
Although the group's members were occasionally referred to as Chetniks, the name White Eagles comes from the anti-communist and pro-fascist paramilitary unit that was formed during World War II, known as Serbian Volunteer Corps. White Eagle refers to the national symbol of Serbia, the double-headed white eagle under a crown.

== History ==
The White Eagles were founded at the end of 1990. The unit's emblem was a white double-headed eagle on a red shield. Its leaders were Vojislav Šešelj, Mirko Jović, Dragoslav Bokan and Milan Lukić.

=== Croatian War of Independence ===
They participated in attacks on the settlement of Slatina in western Slavonia, Lovas in October, and Vukovar in November 1991. The Voćin massacre was the killing of 43 civilians in Voćin by the White Eagles on 13 December 1991.

=== Bosnian War ===
In the Bosnian war, White Eagles participated in attacks on Bosniak paramilitary units that occupied Bijeljina and defended Višegrad. In 1992, Šešelj's men, together with Arkan's Tigers, captured Zvornik.

Members of the White Eagles have been accused of the Višegrad massacre, and the Foča massacre.

The prosecution claimed that these killings were incited by Šešelj's speech, which was dismissed by the Hague Tribunal. the White Eagles have been proven to operate a detention camp in Liješće.

=== Kosovo War ===
They were also active during the war in Kosovo. OSCE reports say that together with Arkan's Tigers, they participated in the persecution and murder of Albanians from Peja.

== Reappearance ==
In December 2010 a group called "White Eagles" (Serbian: Бели Орлови / Beli Orlovi) took responsibility for the killing of Kosovo's Bosniak leader Šefko Salković in the north of Kosovo. The group also took responsibility for obstructions of the election process in northern Kosovska Mitrovica, as well as for attacking KFOR troops.
