= Battle of Rosinjača =

Battle during Croatian war of independence

- Part of Croatian War of Independence
Date	5 December, 1991
Location	Rosinjača Forest, south of Osijek, Croatia
Result	Yugoslav victory

Belligerents
(Socialist Federal Republic of Yugoslavia) Yugoslavia	Croatia

Commanders and leaders
(Socialist Federal Republic of Yugoslavia) Života Panić; Vojislav Šešelj	(Croatia) Salko Ahmić † (Croatia) Mihajlo Peregin †

Units involved
(Socialist Federal Republic of Yugoslavia) Yugoslav People's Army; White Eagles	Armed Forces of Croatia; (Croatia) 106th Osijek Brigade

Strength
(Socialist Federal Republic of Yugoslavia) Unknown; 70 soldiers	(Croatia) 16 soldiers

Casualties and losses
Unknown	all 16 soldiers killed

The Battle of Rosinjača was a battle fought for the forest south of Osijek during the Croatian War of Independence.

== Background ==
The reason for the attack was that these Croatian Army (HV) soldiers were positioned 700 meters west of the village of Tenja, where the Serb civilian population lived, and they posed a threat to them, as they often fired from the forest toward the village.

== Battle ==
On 5 December 1991, after a heavy artillery preparation, JNA forces launched an offensive to finally reach the outskirts of Osijek. They directed their attack through the Rosinjača Forest on the southern approach to the city.

The positions in Rosinjača were held by 16 soldiers of the 106th Osijek Brigade of the Croatian Armed Forces. The defense of the forest was led by Salko Ahmić and Mihajlo Peregin, who were also the oldest in the group of defenders. The battle lasted for three hours, and by its end all 16 Croatian soldiers had been killed, and the JNA had taken complete control of the forest.

== See also ==
- Battle of Kusonje
