= Amir Reko =

Bosnian-Danish entrepreneur and former military officer

- Born: 1963 (age 62–63); Gudelj (Jošanica), Yugoslavia (now Bosnia)
- Military career
- Allegiance: ARBiH
- Nickname: Makedonac
- Unit: East Bosnia Operational Group
- Commands: Commander of 43rd Drina Assault Brigade in Goražde
- Conflicts: Bosnian War

Amir Reko (born 1963), known by his nom de guerre Makedonac ("the Macedonian"), is a Bosnian-Danish entrepreneur and former military officer in the Yugoslav People's Army (JNA) and commander in the Army of the Republic of Bosnia and Herzegovina (ARBiH) during the Bosnian War (1992–1995). He is best known for saving the lives of 45 Bosnian Serb civilians in 1992.

== Early life ==
An ethnic Bosniak, Reko was born in the hamlet of Gudelj of the village Jošanica in Foča in eastern Bosnia. During World War II his grandmother was saved by a Serb.

He went to the primary school in the village of Ustikolina, after which he moved to Sarajevo and graduated from the middle technical school in 1982. He graduated from the Army military school in 1986 as an infantry soldier. He served as an officer (časnik) in Novo Mesto (in Slovenia), Gospić (Croatia), Pljevlja (Montenegro), Bitola (Macedonia), and Zaječar (Serbia).

== War in Bosnia ==
Reko deserted from the JNA in April 1992. Despite his belief in "Brotherhood and Unity", the reality of the situation forced him to leave the JNA when the war spilled over into Bosnia. Upon learning that Serb forces had occupied Foča and his village, he contacted his ethnic Serb friend and JNA colleague Dragan Simić, stationed in Niš, and told him that he would leave to be with his family. Simić offered to help, and the two went to Bosnia. They had to cross from Serb-held territory into Bosniak-held territory to reach Goražde, where Reko believed his family took refuge. His colleague saved him from Bosnian Serb policemen at Ustiprača.

As a military academy graduate, Reko became the first commander of the 43rd Drina Assault Brigade (43. Drinska udarna brigada) of ARBiH, based in Goražde. His nom de guerre was Makedonac due to his years of service in Bitola. He was unable to meet up with his family in Gudelj, as the village was under Army of Republika Srpska (VRS) control. When Serb soldiers cleansed the village, they killed his mother Aziza and grandfather, along with five other family members, by setting their house on fire. Reko stated that he knew who were the perpetrators, and that one lived in Canada.

A few days later, the municipal headquarters of the Territorial Defense ordered the cleansing of the Serb village of Bučje as it posed a threat due to VRS progress. Reko refused this chance for revenge and was called weak and a traitor. He organized talks with the inhabitants of Bučje to lay down their weapons and surrender. As a result, the villagers - 45 Serbs and a few Bosniaks - were saved.

Reko learnt that he was marked for assassination for saving Serbs, by people that would later work in the Bosnian government. After the war he set up a memorial to the killed members of his family.

== Post-war life ==
After the war, Reko moved to Denmark. He became a successful businessman, and established a family, with two children. He and his wife eventually divorced. In 2008, he met with his childhood romance Azra in Bosnia, who was a widow with two children. They eventually married.

He owns Bohen, a Danish-Bosnian company that produces gaskets, parts of rubber and plastic and parts for water and heating. He currently lives in Denmark with his family. Reko established the political movement "Most 21", aimed at a multi-ethnic unitary state.

Makedonac, a documentary on his life, was made in 2016. There are plans for a movie. He has been interviewed by various newspapers and invited by TV shows such as RTRS's Telering, Prva's Život Priča, Face's Face to Face, Happy TV's Jutarnji program, Elta's Razgovor, OSMTV's Lice Nacije.

In 2022, an international group of university professors started a campaign to nominate Reko for the Nobel Peace Prize.

== Sources ==
- "Amir Reko, direktor i suvlasnik Bohen DK i Bohen d.o.o.: BiH može napraviti kvalitetan proizvod, dostaviti ga na vrijeme i biti konkurentna na svjetskom nivou". Ličnosti. eKapija; akta. 22 September 2009.
- "Amir Reko - čovjek koji nije želio biti zločinac". Politika. DW. 4 January 2017.
- "Spasao 45 Srba, a tri dana ranije ubili su njegove". B92. 12 October 2017.
