= Jošanica, Foča =

Jošanica
- Village
- Location within Republika Srpska Location within Bosnia and Herzegovina
- Coordinates: 43°33′22″N 18°50′04″E
- Country: Bosnia and Herzegovina
- Entity: Republika Srpska
- Municipality: Foča
- Time zone: UTC+1 (CET)
  - Summer (DST): UTC+2 (CEST)

Jošanica (Serbian Cyrillic: Јошаница) is a village in the municipality of Foča, Republika Srpska, Bosnia and Herzegovina.

== Monument ==
The monument is dedicated to the memory of 56 Serbs who were killed on December 19, 1992. The names of the victims are on the monument. It is located in the hamlet of Hodžići in Jošanica.

== Notable people ==
- Amir Reko (born 1963), businessman and former ARBiH officer
