= Vojislav Šešelj =

Serbian politician (born 1954)

- Војислав Шешељ
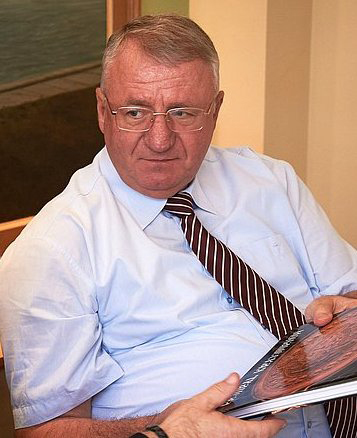
- Šešelj in 2016

Member of the National Assembly
- In office 3 June 2016 – 3 August 2020
- In office 24 October 2000 – 24 February 2003
- In office 8 July 1991 – 24 March 1998

Deputy Prime Minister of Serbia
- In office 24 March 1998 – 24 October 2000

President of the Zemun Municipality
- In office December 1996 – April 1998
- Preceded by: Nenad Ribar
- Succeeded by: Stevo Dragišić

Personal details
- Born: 11 October 1954 (age 72) Sarajevo, PR Bosnia and Herzegovina, SFR Yugoslavia
- Party: SKJ (BiH) (1971–81); SSP (1990); SPO (1990); SČP (1990–1991); SRS (1991–present)
- Spouse(s): Vesna Mudreša; Jadranka Šešelj (1992–present)
- Children: 4, including Aleksandar
- Education: University of Sarajevo (LLB); University of Belgrade (LLM, LLD)
- Profession: Jurist
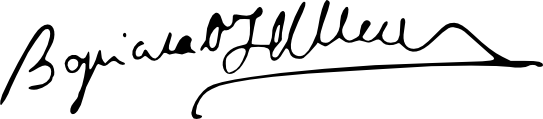
- Signature
- Website: vseselj.rs

Military service
- Allegiance: SFR Yugoslavia; FR Yugoslavia; Serbian Krajina; Republika Srpska
- Branch/service: Yugoslav Ground Forces
- Years of service: 1979–1980; 1991–1995
- Rank: Commander
- Unit: Serbian Chetnik Movement; White Eagles
- Battles/wars: Croatian War of Independence; 1991 Yugoslav campaign in Croatia; Battle of Borovo Selo; Battle of Vukovar; Battle of Rosinjača; Bosnian war; 1992 Yugoslav campaign in Bosnia; Defense of Foča; Battle of Pofalići; Battle of Karuše

Vojislav Šešelj (Serbian Cyrillic: Војислав Шешељ, pronounced [ʋǒjislaʋ ʃěʃeʎ]; born 11 October 1954) is a Serbian politician and convicted war criminal. He is the founder and president of the far-right Serbian Radical Party (SRS). From 1998 to 2000, he was a deputy prime minister of Serbia.

In January 2003, Šešelj was charged by the ICTY with crimes against humanity and war crimes stemming from the Croatian War of Independence and Bosnian War. These charges were confirmed by a judge on February 14, 2003, and Šešelj surrendered to the ICTY on February 23, 2003. His trial did not begin until November 7, 2007. Šešelj's trial was marred by controversy: he went on a hunger strike for nearly a month until finally being allowed to represent himself, regularly insulted the judges and court prosecutors once proceedings commenced, disclosed the identities of protected witnesses and was penalized on three occasions for disrespecting the court. He did not call any witnesses in his defense.

After spending 11 years and 9 months in detention in the United Nations Detention Unit of Scheveningen during his trial, Šešelj was permitted to temporarily return to Serbia in November 2014 to undergo cancer treatment. He led the SRS in the 2016 elections, and his party won 23 seats in the parliament.

On 31 March 2016, he was acquitted in a first-instance verdict on all counts by the ICTY. The acquittal was appealed by prosecutors from the MICT, a United Nations Security Council agency which functions as oversight program of, and successor entity to, the ICTY. On 11 April 2018, the Appeals Chamber partially reversed the first-instance verdict, finding Šešelj guilty of crimes against humanity for his role in instigating the deportation of Croats from Hrtkovci. He was found not guilty on the remaining counts of his indictment, including all the war crimes and crimes against humanity that he was alleged to have committed in Croatia and Bosnia. Šešelj was sentenced to 10 years in prison, but because of time already spent in ICTY custody, he was not obligated to return to prison. In August 2018 Šešelj appealed the conviction to the MICT Appeals Chamber, but was denied as no evidence of error in the judgement or proceedings was given.

== Early life ==
Vojislav Šešelj was born in Sarajevo, PR Bosnia and Herzegovina, FPR Yugoslavia, to Nikola Šešelj (1925–1978) and Danica Šešelj (née Misita; 1924–2007), Serbs from the Popovo Valley region of eastern Herzegovina. His parents wed in 1953 before moving to Sarajevo, where they lived on modest means in adapted housing at the old Sarajevo train station as his father was employed in the state-run ŽTP railway company. His mother stayed at home and took care of her two children, Vojislav and his younger sister, Dragica. A relative on his mother's side was Chetnik commander Lt. Col. Veselin Misita.

== Education ==
Šešelj began his elementary education in September 1961 at the Vladimir Nazor Primary School before transferring to the newly built Bratstvo i Jedinstvo primary school. A successful student until the fourth grade, he increasingly grew uninterested with the curriculum, realising the minimal effort he needed in order to achieve adequate grades. History was his favourite subject and he generally preferred social sciences to natural ones.

For his secondary education, Šešelj enrolled at the First Sarajevo Gymnasium, receiving good grades. He was involved with student organisations in school as the president of the gymnasium's student union and later as the president of its youth committee.

Šešelj continued going to youth work actions for summer holidays while at the gymnasium. In 1972 and 1973, he worked as a labourer around the Morava River, building embankments.

=== Undergraduate ===
After his second level schooling, Šešelj enrolled at the University of Sarajevo's faculty of law in autumn 1973. He additionally took part in student bodies becoming a vice-dean counterpart in the student organisation for fifteen months. Controversy followed him again as he openly criticised Fuad Muhić, a candidate for dean, publicly proclaiming Muhić unfit to perform the duties of that position. Muhić still got elected to the post. After being a tutor for freshmen, Šešelj became a course demonstrator, holding two sets of tutorials per week, helping professors with student oral exams as well as with conference papers. In 1975, as part of a university delegation, the 21-year-old Šešelj visited the University of Mannheim in West Germany for two weeks, which was his first trip abroad. He completed his four-year undergraduate studies in two years and eight months.

=== Postgraduate ===
Immediately after graduating in 1976, Šešelj wanted a job as assistant lecturer at the University of Sarajevo's faculty of law; however, no assistant positions were posted at the faculty for the following school year, leaving him with nothing to apply for. Šešelj saw the unusual situation as Muhić's personal revenge for Šešelj's public criticism.

Realizing he had minimal chances of getting hired at the faculty of law in Sarajevo, Šešelj turned his attention to other faculties. While preparing his application for the faculty of law in Mostar (at the time organizationally transforming from a remote unit of Sarajevo's law faculty into a separate independent educational entity) where they needed assistants for courses on constitutional law, he learned of an assistant job posting at Sarajevo University's faculty of political science for a course called "Political Parties and Organizations" and decided instead to apply there. He had friends, such as Zdravko Grebo, Rodoljub Marjanović, and Milan Tomić, already working at the faculty as assistants, while Grebo's mother was the faculty's dean.

After learning that the 'Political Parties and Organisations' course was taught by professor Atif Purivatra, a friend and political companion of Muhić, Šešelj withdrew his application, fearing a rejection that would reflect badly on future vocational efforts. Through Grebo's mother, Šešelj learned the faculty was about to establish the Department for People's Defence, where many assistants would be needed.

During this time, Šešelj also began his postgraduate studies, enrolling in November 1976 at the University of Belgrade's faculty of law. Due to employment obligations in Sarajevo, he did not move to Belgrade, but instead travelled there twice a month to attend lectures and obtain literature. He earned his master's degree in June 1977 with a thesis titled The Marxist Concept of an Armed People.

In 1978, he spent two and a half months at the Grand Valley State Colleges in the US in its exchange program with the University of Sarajevo.

Also in 1978, after returning from the U.S., Šešelj began pursuing a doctorate at the Belgrade University's faculty of law. After submitting his dissertation in early autumn 1979, he chose specialisation at the University of Greifswald in East Germany. He earned his doctorate on 26 November 1979, after successfully defending his dissertation titled The Political Essence of Militarism and Fascism, which made him the youngest PhD holder in Yugoslavia at 25 years of age.

In December 1979, Šešelj joined the Yugoslav People's Army to serve his mandatory military service and was stationed in Belgrade. He completed his army service in November 1980, but in the meantime he had lost his position at the University of Sarajevo's faculty of political sciences.

== Academic career ==
=== University of Sarajevo ===
In the early 1980s, Šešelj began to associate more with individuals from dissident intellectual circles in Belgrade, some of whom had Serbian nationalist political leanings. He repeatedly held Muslim professors at the faculty of political sciences responsible for his situation, openly criticising his former friend Atif Purivatra, as well as Hasan Sušić, and Omer Ibrahimagić, for having harmed his career and denouncing them as Pan-Islamists.

In September 1981, Šešelj joined the faculty of political sciences, as one of its youngest members. The faculty of political sciences, as a breeding ground for future politicians, was closely controlled and overseen by the Communist Party, and outspoken Šešelj quickly drew the attention of party officials.

==== Controversy and UDBA ====
The biggest controversy was raised when Šešelj came up against faculty colleague Brano Miljuš. A protege of Hamdija Pozderac and Branko Mikulić (SR Bosnia-Herzegovina's highest and most powerful political figures at the time), Miljuš was well positioned within the communist apparatus as the secretary of the Bosnia-Herzegovina Communist League's Sarajevo branch. Šešelj dissected Miljuš's master's degree thesis and accused him of plagiarising more than 40 pages in it from the published works by Edvard Kardelj.

Šešelj criticised the highest political echelons, particularly Pozderac who was the reviewer of Miljuš's master's degree thesis. A power struggle spilled outside the faculty and into the political institutions and corridors of power. Other faculty members and intellectuals to offer their support to Šešelj included Boro Gojković, Džemal Sokolović, Hidajet Repovac, Momir Zeković and Ina Ovadija-Musafija. The Pozderac side was stronger; Šešelj was expelled from the Communist League on 4 December 1981.

By spring 1982, barely six months after being re-hired, his position at the faculty of political sciences was in jeopardy. He ended up being demoted to the Institute for Social Research (Institut za društvena istraživanja), an institution affiliated with the faculty. Belgrade intellectuals, mostly writers and researchers in the social sciences, came to his defence by writing letters of protest to the government of the Socialist Republic of Bosnia and Herzegovina, to the Central Committee of the League of Communists of Bosnia and Herzegovina, and to the Faculty of Political Science in Sarajevo.

He began to be spied on by UDBA agents. Šešelj's first arrest took place on 8 February 1984, the second day of the Sarajevo Olympics. He was on a train from Sarajevo heading to Belgrade when the secret police burst on board around Podlugovi station and seized some of his writings that he had in the suitcase. Among the agents handling his arrest that day was Dragan Kijac (later Republika Srpska state security chief).

In Doboj, Šešelj was taken off the train, transferred into a police Mercedes, and transported to Belgrade where he was questioned for 27 hours before being released and informed that he would be contacted again. After getting back to Sarajevo, UDBA took him in twice more for questionings, which were handled by Rašid Musić and Milan Krnjajić. According to Šešelj, they had the transcripts of the various conversations he had with some of his closest friends in which he and his friends openly criticised subjects ranging from specific political figures and the communist regime in general, and were trying to get him to implicate them as a basis for "a group trial for ethnic balance purposes, [...] a Serbian group to persecute since they just convicted Izetbegović's Muslim one."

On 20 April 1984, he was arrested at a private apartment in Belgrade among the group of 28 individuals during the lecture given by Milovan Đilas as part of Free University, a semi-clandestine organisation that gathered intellectuals critical of the communist regime. Šešelj spent four days in prison before being released.

=== Prison ===
However, Šešelj was a free man for barely three weeks. In mid-May 1984, Stane Dolanc, the Slovene representative in Yugoslav Presidency and longtime state security chief, gave an interview to TV Belgrade regarding Šešelj's unpublished manuscript, Odgovori na anketu-intervju: Šta da se radi? in which Šešelj calls for "reorganization of the Yugoslav federalism, SFR Yugoslavia with only four constituent republics (Serbia, Macedonia, Croatia and Slovenia), abolishing of the single-party system, and the abolishing of artificial nationalities".

Two days later, on 15 May 1984, Šešelj was arrested again in Sarajevo. Several days after being jailed at Sarajevo's Central Prison, he began a hunger strike, which attracted the attention of the foreign press. In jail, he passed the time by reading without devoting much effort to preparing his defence at the impending trial. A few weeks later, his then wife Vesna Mudreša gave birth to their first child – a boy named Nikola, after Šešelj's father – however, Šešelj refused to end the hunger strike even after being told this. Weak, frail, and with rapidly deteriorating overall health, he eventually relented on the last day of the trial, ending the strike after 48 days.

Several days later, on 9 July 1984, he was given an eight-year sentence. The verdict delivered by presiding judge Milorad Potparić concluded that Šešelj "acted from the anarcho-liberal and nationalist platform thereby committing the criminal act of counterrevolutionary endangerment of the social order". The single most incriminating piece of evidence cited by the court was the unpublished manuscript that the secret police found in Šešelj's home. On appeal, the Supreme Court of SFR Yugoslavia reduced the sentence to six years, then to four, and finally two.

Šešelj served the first eight months of his sentence in Sarajevo before getting transferred to prison in Zenica in January 1985, where he was placed in quarantine and isolated from other inmates for three weeks while medical checks and general psychological observation were conducted in order to come up with a rehabilitation plan and program during his prison stay. From the start he informed the prison officials of his refusal to do any labour, reasoning that "since jailed communists didn't have to do prison labour in the pre-World War II capitalist Yugoslavia, I too, as someone espousing anti-communist ideology, refuse to do labour in a communist prison".

His conduct earned him multiple stays in solitary confinement that initially lasted two weeks but were later extended to a whole month. During his first solitary confinement stay he went on another hunger strike. A week into his strike, he was beaten by the guards in an effort to force him to stop, but he did not, lasting 16 days without food. In total, out of his fourteen months in Zenica, six and a half were spent in solitary confinement. He was released in March 1986 – two months early due to continuous pressure, protests and petitions by intellectuals throughout Yugoslavia and abroad, many of whom would later become his political opponents. Upon release from prison, Šešelj permanently moved to Belgrade. According to John Mueller, Šešelj "later seems to have become mentally unbalanced as the result of the torture and beatings he endured while in prison".

== Political career ==
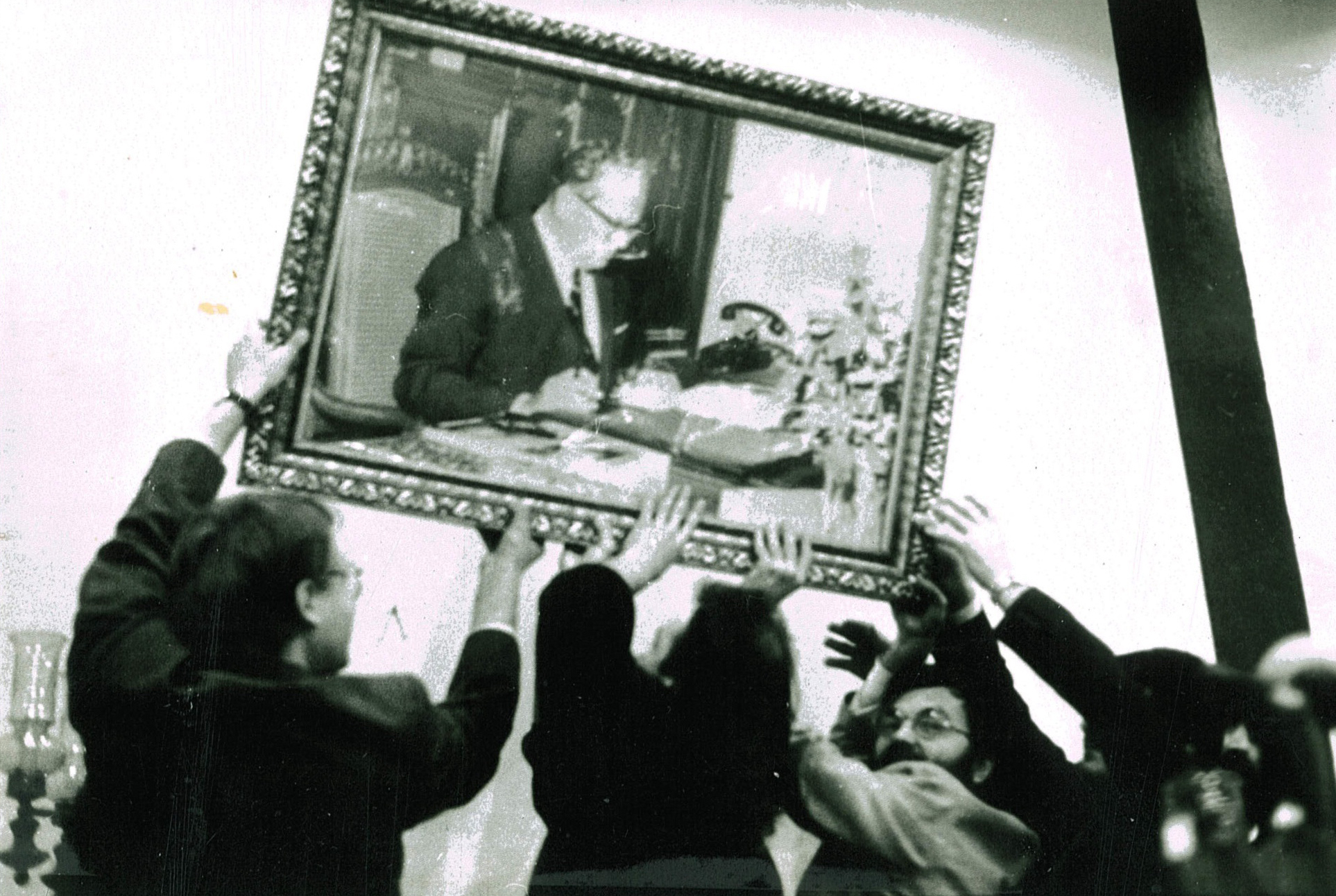
Šešelj with Vuk Drašković of Serbian Renewal Movement, and Milan Mladenović of People's Radical Party in 1990, removing picture of Josip Broz Tito from Belgrade Center of engineers and electricians.

The borders of Greater Serbia defined by the Virovitica–Karlovac–Karlobag line as propagated by Šešelj in 1992.

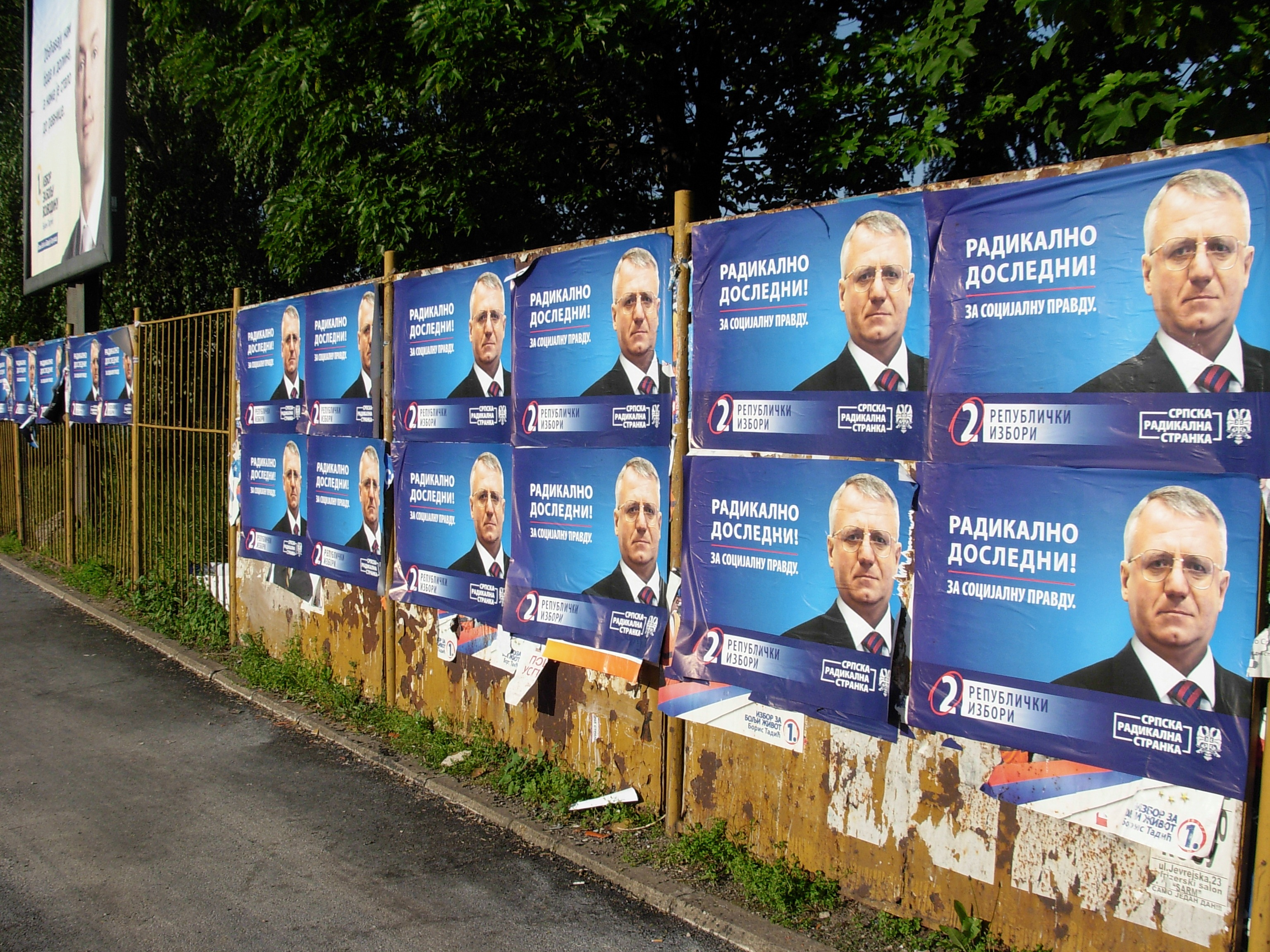
Vojislav Šešelj, president of the Serbian Radical Party, is one of the staunchest advocates of Greater Serbia.

In 1989, Šešelj returned to the United States where Momčilo Đujić, a Chetnik leader from World War II living there in exile, bestowed on Šešelj the title Chetnik vojvoda (Vojvoda of the Chetniks), the first since World War II, to make a "unitary Serbian state where all Serbs would live, occupying all the Serb lands". In 1998, Đujić said that he regretted awarding the title to Šešelj on account of his involvement with Slobodan Milošević. Together with Vuk Drašković and Mirko Jović, Šešelj founded the anti-communist Chetnik party Serbian National Renewal (SNO) in late 1989. As a prominent intellectual in a society that idolised intellectuals, Šešelj was considered to be a potential leader from the late 1980s onward. Šešelj was the youngest person to have been awarded a PhD in Yugoslavia and his career as a successful author made him widely known. In the late 1980s, Šešelj made calls for 360,000 Albanians to be deported from Kosovo.

In March 1990, together with Drašković, he however went on to form the monarchist party Serbian Renewal Movement (SPO). that he soon left again to form the more radical Serbian Chetnik Movement (SČP). Because of its name the party was denied registration, but was merged in March 1991 with the National Radical Party (NRS) creating the Serbian Radical Party (SRS) under his presidency.

He has described himself and his supporters as "not fascists, just chauvinists who hate Croats." In 1991, Šešelj founded his Chetnik militia with the aim of winning military glory that would assist with his political career. In late 1991, during the Battle of Vukovar, Šešelj went to Borovo Selo to meet with a Serbian Orthodox Church bishop and publicly described Croats as a genocidal and perverted people.

The paramilitary group White Eagles active at the time in the Yugoslav Wars was reportedly associated with him, being referred to as Šešeljevci ("Šešelj's men"). This association has been denied several times by Šešelj. Šešelj's militia was highly undisciplined and prone to substance abuse, most notably alcohol. Professional Serb Army officers fighting in Croatia and Bosnia-Herzegovina greatly disliked working with the Šešeljevci who did not always follow orders. In May and July 1992, Šešelj visited the Vojvodina village of Hrtkovci and initiated a campaign of persecution of local ethnic Croats. In the elections of December 1992, the SRS won 27 per cent of the vote versus the 40 per cent won by the Socialist Party of President Slobodan Milošević. Šešelj's relationship with Milošević was amicable during the first years of the Yugoslav Wars. The German political scientist Klaus Schlichte described Šešelj as the leader of the Serbian para-military groups fighting in Bosnia-Herzegovina "with the most outspoken political ambition. His main motive for settling up a para-military troop was certainly less personal enrichment than to cultivate the charisma of a warrior and other personal attributes that make up his political persona". Schlicte described Šešelj's relationship with the Serb state as "instrumental", namely he was willing to work with Milošević to obtain arms and permission to send his followers to the frontlines in Bosnia-Herzegovina.

Šešelj and his party were in effect Milošević's close allies who helped them orchestrate the mass layoffs of journalists in 1992, and Šešelj publicly proclaimed their backing of Milošević as late as August 1993. Šešelj publicly advocated creating a Greater Serbia through the ethnic cleansing of all Croats and Bosniaks.

In September 1993, however, Šešelj and Milošević came into conflict over Milošević's withdrawal of support for Republika Srpska in the Bosnian War, and Milošević described Šešelj as "the personification of violence and primitivism". In 1993, the Milošević regime cut off all support for Šešelj's Chetniks out of the fear that Šešelj was becoming too popular and might pose a threat to the regime. Moreover, the alliance with Milošević was ultimately tenuous. The name Chetniks for his militia was intended to suggest that it was a continuation of the Chetniks of World War Two while Milošević served as the leader of the Serb Socialist Party (the renamed League of Serb Communists who could trace their origins to the Partisans). Šešelj was jailed in 1994 and 1995 for his opposition to Milošević. The Serbian Radical Party subsequently became the main opposition party and criticised Slobodan Milošević for corruption, ties to organised crime, nepotism, and for poor economic conditions.

In 1995, Šešelj wrote in the publication Velika Srbija (Greater Serbia) a memorandum that outlined the Serbianisation of Kosovo. Šešelj called for violence and expulsion against Albanians and their leadership with aims toward discrediting them within Western public opinion.

In July 1997, Šešelj made a guest appearance on BKTV's Tête-à-tête talk duel programme with lawyer Nikola Barović as the other duelist. The duel quickly degenerated into an exchange of verbal antagonism and ad hominem attacks that culminated in Barović throwing water from a glass in Šešelj's face. Sometime later Barović was physically assaulted by Šešelj's security detail. Šešelj quipped that Barović slipped on a banana peel and tumbled down a flight of stairs.

In 1998, as violence in the Serbian province of Kosovo increased, Šešelj joined Milošević's national unity government, siding briefly with the pro-Milošević government. Šešelj was appointed deputy prime minister. In September of the same year, he objected to foreign media and human rights organisations acting in Yugoslavia, saying:

If we cannot grab all their (NATO) planes, we can grab those within our reach, like various Helsinki committees, and Quisling groups. To those who we prove have participated in the service of foreign propaganda and those are the Voice of America, Deutsche Welle, Radio Free Europe, Radio France International, and the BBC radio service etc. If we find them in the moment of aggression they shouldn't expect anything good.

Human Rights Watch condemned the statement.

During the 1999 Kosovo War and the NATO bombing of Yugoslavia, Šešelj and his political party were willing to support Milošević, but after three months of bombardment they were the only party to vote against the withdrawal of FR Yugoslav security forces from Kosovo. Šešelj advocated the forcible removal of all Albanians from Kosovo.

== ICTY/MICT ==
=== Indictment ===
In an interview for NIN which was conducted on 4 February 2003, Šešelj stated that he had inside information that he would be indicted by the Hague in the following weeks, and had already booked a flight to the Hague for 24 February. The initial indictment was filed on 14 February 2003.

The crimes in the indictment include, among others, that Šešelj, both individually and as part of a "joint criminal enterprise", engaged in "the permanent forcible removal, through the commission of crimes in violation of Articles 3 and 5 of the Statute of the Tribunal, of a majority of the Croat, Muslim and other non Serb populations from approximately one-third of the territory of the Republic of Croatia ("Croatia"), and large parts of Bosnia and Herzegovina, and from parts of Vojvodina, in the Republic of Serbia ("Serbia"), in order to make these areas part of a new Serb-dominated state".

=== Custody and trial ===
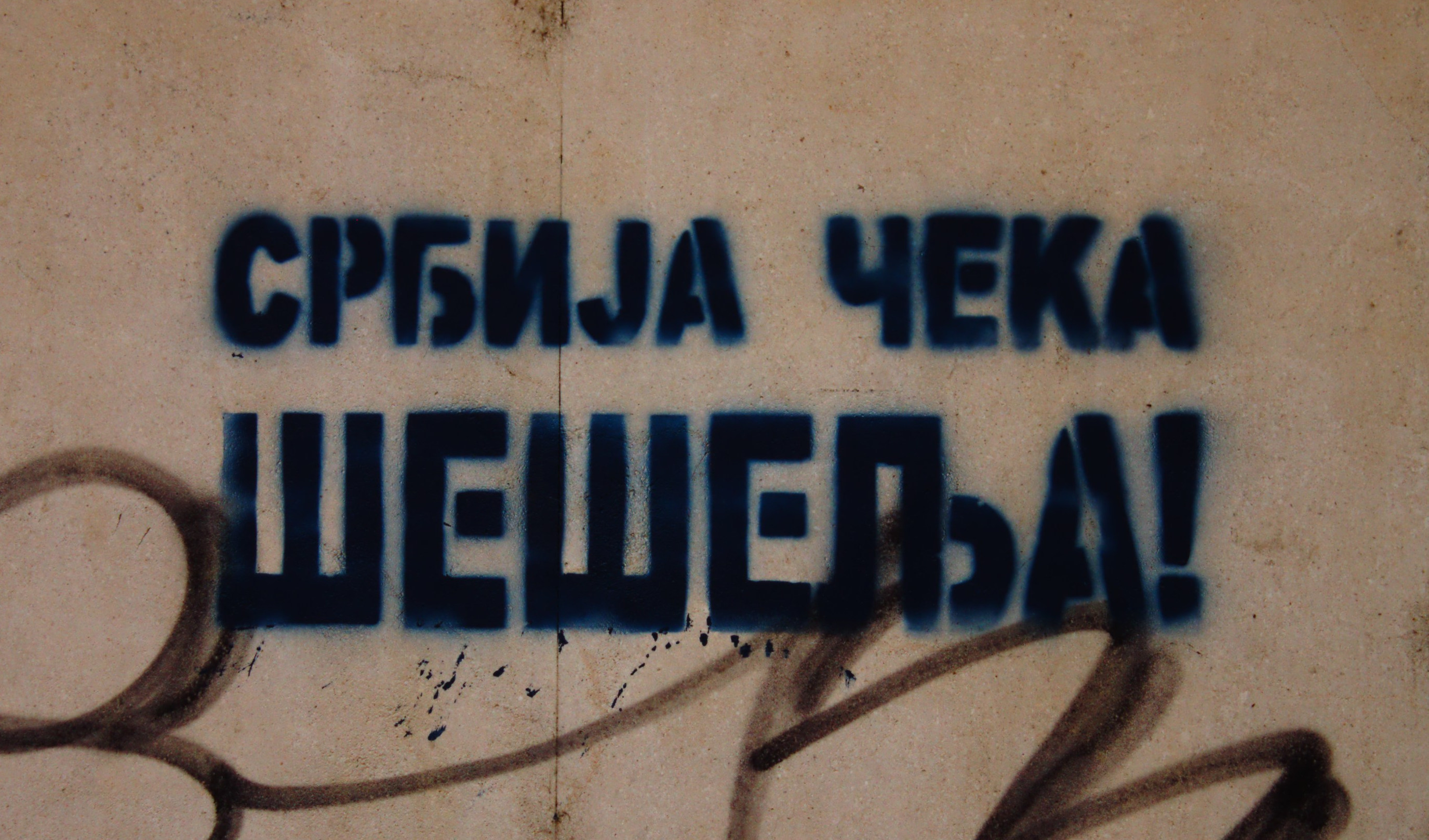
Србија чека Шешеља! (Serbia awaits Šešelj!) graffiti supporting Šešelj

On 23 February 2003, following a "farewell meeting" held on Republic Square, Šešelj surrendered to the International Criminal Tribunal for the Former Yugoslavia (ICTY) on the indictment of "eight counts of crimes against humanity and six counts of violations of the laws or customs of war for his alleged participation in a joint criminal enterprise". He was transferred to the ICTY the following day.

In 2005, Šešelj made headlines when he was asked to read a letter which he earlier sent to the ICTY that stated his contempt for the court. The letter was read in front of cameras by Šešelj and contained insults and expletives aimed at the top ICTY officials and judges. In his letter, Šešelj said the presiding judge has only "the right" (mocking the Hague's judges) to perform oral sex on him, and referred to Carla Del Ponte as "the prostitute".

During his time in custody, he wrote Kriminalac i ratni zločinac Havijer Solana (Felon and War Criminal Javier Solana), a criticism of the NATO Secretary General (and the current High Representative for the Common Foreign and Security Policy and the Secretary-General of the Council of the European Union and the Western European Union) who led the 1999 war in Kosovo.

On 2 December 2006, around 40,000 people marched in the Serbian capital of Belgrade in support of Šešelj during his 28-day hunger strike in The Hague after the ICTY denied him the right to choose his own defence counsel. Speaking at the rally, Radical Party secretary Aleksandar Vučić said "He's not fighting just for his life. But he's fighting for all of us who are gathered here. Vojislav Šešelj is fighting for Serbia!"

Šešelj ended the hunger strike on 8 December after being allowed to present his own defence. While in custody in The Hague, Šešelj led his party's list of contenders for the January 2007 general election.

Under the ICTY indictment, Šešelj was charged with 15 counts of crimes against humanity and violations of the laws or customs of war. The first of these charges is for persecution of Croats, Muslims and other non-Serbs in Vukovar, Šamac, Zvornik and Vojvodina. The other charges include murder, forced deportation, illegal imprisonment, torture and property destruction during the Yugoslav wars.

Šešelj's aide, Ljubiša Petković, was found guilty by the ICTY's Trial Chamber III of contempt for refusing to appear as a Chamber's witness in Šešelj's trial. Petković was released on 26 September from the ICTY Detention Unit. He had been sentenced to four months' imprisonment, credit being given for the three months and 14 days already spent in the Detention Unit.

His trial officially began on 7 November 2007.

On 11 February 2009, after 71 witnesses had been heard and with the expected conclusion of the prosecution's case seven hours away, the presiding judges suspended Šešelj's trial indefinitely at the request of prosecutors, who alleged that witnesses were being intimidated. Šešelj claimed the true motive of the prosecutors was that they were losing their case. He claimed the court had presented numerous false witnesses to avoid having to acquit him and said it should pay him damages for "all the suffering and six years spent in detention".

One of the three judges voted against the suspension of the trial stating that it was "unfair to interrupt the trial of someone who has spent almost six years in detention". A contempt of court case against Šešelj was opened for having revealed, in a book he had written, the identities of three witnesses whose names had been ordered suppressed by the tribunal, and for which he was sentenced to 15 months imprisonment by the ICTY.

On 24 July 2009, he was sentenced to 15 months in detention for disrespecting the court after publishing names of trial witnesses on his personal website.

On 25 November 2009, it was announced that Šešelj's trial would resume on 12 January 2010. The trial resumed on schedule and continued until 17 March 2010.

On 10 March 2010, the weekly ICTY press briefing announced that Šešelj was scheduled to appear in court on 20 April 2010 for contempt of court for allegedly disclosing court restricted information on 11 protected witnesses. This is the second time he was charged with contempt. In July 2009 he was found guilty of contempt on similar charges involving two protected witnesses and was sentenced to fifteen months in jail.

On 17 March 2010, the weekly ICTY press briefing announced that "The trial of Vojislav Šešelj has been adjourned until further notice, pending checks on the health status of the remaining four Chamber witnesses". In the weekly ICTY briefing on 24 March stated "The trial of Vojislav Šešelj is expected to continue on Tuesday at 14:15 in Courtroom I with the testimony of one of the four remaining Trial Chamber witnesses". On 14 April 2010, the weekly ICTY press briefing announced that with only one witness still to be heard, on 30 March 2010 Šešelj trial was adjourned until further notice but was likely to resume in May 2010, after Šešelj's second contempt proceeding initiated against him by the Tribunal have ended.

Prosecutors demanded a 28-year sentence against Šešelj for allegedly recruiting paramilitary groups and inciting them to commit atrocities during the Balkan wars of the early 1990s. In closing remarks at his war crimes trial on 14 March 2012, Šešelj said the Yugoslav tribunal empowered by the U.N. Security Council is actually a creation of Western intelligence agencies and it doesn't have jurisdiction in his case. He reportedly vowed "to make a mockery of his trial".

In September 2011, the ICTY rejected Šešelj's bid to have his long-running trial discontinued. In his submission to the court, Šešelj had argued that his right to be tried in a reasonable amount of time has been violated, and called the situation "incomprehensible, scandalous and inappropriate". However, the bench ruled that "there is no predetermined threshold with regard to the time period beyond which a trial may be considered unfair on account of undue delay" and declared that Šešelj "failed to provide concrete proof of abuse of process".

=== Provisional release ===
On 6 November 2014, the ICTY granted Šešelj provisional release. The decision was made on the basis of Šešelj's diagnosis of metastatic cancer and deteriorating health.

The ICTY did not reveal to the public the conditions under which Šešelj was released, but announced that no special conditions were set for him, except that he does not leave Serbia, has no contact with victims and witnesses, and that he returns to the custody of the ICTY when he is summoned.

Šešelj returned to Belgrade with thousands of sympathizers waiting for him after spending more than 11 years on what proved to be an inconclusive trial at the Hague.

=== First verdict ===
On 31 March 2016, one week after the conviction of Bosnian Serb leader Radovan Karadžić, the ICTY found Šešelj not guilty on all charges, with a majority decision on eight counts and a unanimous decision on one.

His acquittal was described by The Economist as "a victory for advocates of ethnic cleansing" which would have "broad ramifications for international justice." Aleksandar Vučić, who served as the PM at the time, commented that the case against Šešelj was inherently flawed and politicised from the beginning.

=== Reversing of acquittal ===
The previous acquittal was later appealed by prosecutors from the MICT, a United Nations Security Council agency which functions as oversight program of, and successor entity to, the ICTY. On 11 April 2018, the Appeals Chamber entered convictions against him under Counts 1, 10 and 11 for instigating deportation, persecution (forcible displacement), and other inhumane acts (forcible transfer) as crimes against humanity due to his speech in Hrtkovci on 6 May 1992, in which he called for the expulsion of Croats from Vojvodina. He was sentenced to 10 years of imprisonment, though due to his time served under the custody of the ICTY pending trial, the sentence was declared served.

In August 2018, Šešelj would submit a request to the MICT Appeals Chamber to be heard for appeal regarding the 11 April 2018 decision. This was denied due to an absence of evidence in his request that the previous appeal judgement contained errors or that his procedural rights had been violated.

== Personal life ==
Šešelj's wife, Jadranka Šešelj (Serbian Cyrillic: Јадранка Шешељ) was born in Podujevo on 13 April 1960. She participated in the President of Serbia elections in 2012 but failed to pass the first round gaining 3.78% of the votes. She is a member of the SRS.

== Health ==
Šešelj was diagnosed with metastatic cancer and underwent surgery to remove a tumor from his colon on 19 December 2013, and later underwent chemotherapy.

== Books ==
Šešelj has authored a total of 183 books, mostly in the form of (court) documents and transcripts from interviews and public appearances. Some of the book titles are formulated as insults to his opponents, ICTY judges and prosecutors, and domestic and foreign political figures.

== Honours ==
- 29 January 2015: White Angel honour received at the Mileševa Monastery by hand of the Serbian Orthodox bishop Filaret.

== Literature ==
- Bartrop, Paul R. (2012). A Biographical Encyclopedia of Contemporary Genocide. Santa Barbara: ABC-CLIO. ISBN 978-0-313-38679-4.
- Cigar, Norman (1995). Genocide in Bosnia: The Policy of "Ethnic Cleansing". College Station, Minnesota: University of Minnesota Press. ISBN 978-1-58544-004-7.
- Mueller, John (Summer 2000). "The Banality of 'Ethnic War'" (PDF). International Security. 25 (1): 42–70. doi:10.1162/016228800560381. ISSN 0162-2889. S2CID 31364272.
- Schlichte, Klaus (January 2010). "Na krilima patriotisma—On the Wings of Patriotism: Delegated and Spin-Off Violence in Serbia". Armed Forces & Society. 36 (2): 310–326. doi:10.1177/0095327X09339897.
