= Free Democrats Group =

The Free Democrats Group was a political group in the Parliamentary Assembly of the Council of Europe (PACE) that existed from 2017 to 2019.

The Free Democrats Group was founded in June 2017 and was formally recognized by the PACE on September 4, 2017. It was dissolved on 30 June 2019.
