= Ceklin =

Historical tribe and region in Montenegro

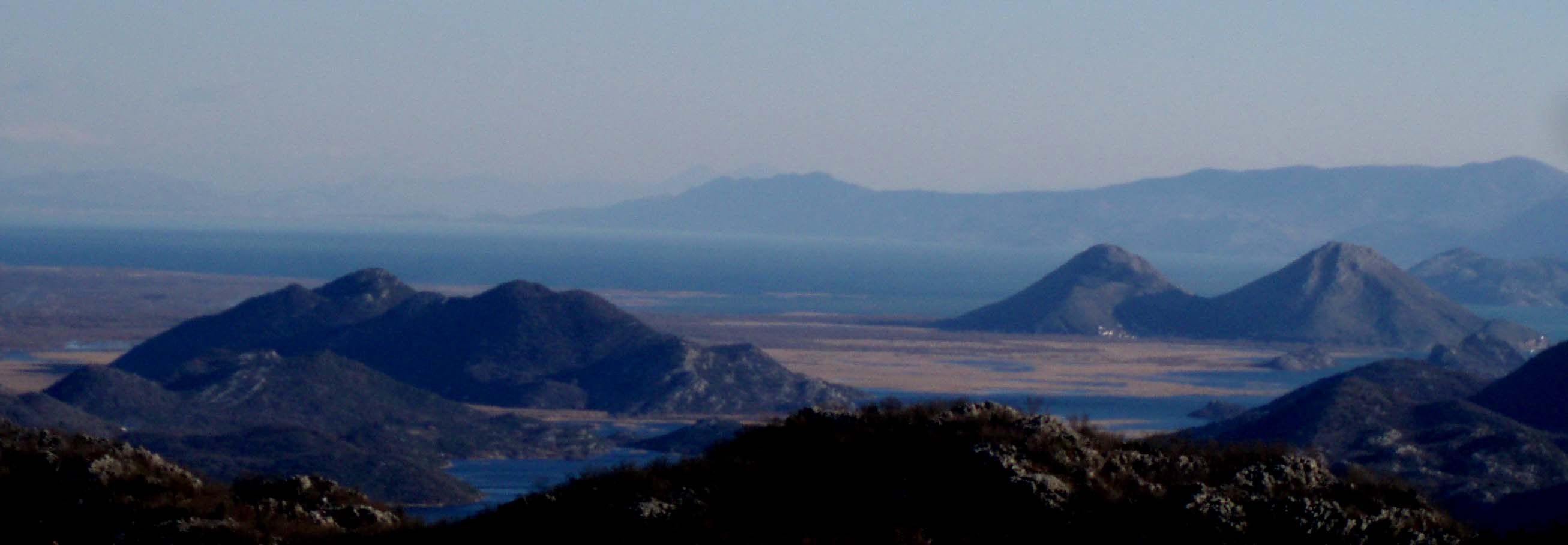
Lake Skadar. View from Ceklin

Ceklin (Montenegrin Cyrillic: Цеклин; Albanian: Ceklinë) is a historical tribe (pleme) and region in Montenegro. It is divided into two clans: Gornjaci (the Upper) and Donjaci (the Lower). The Gornjaci are descendants of Leka, who came from the Kelmendi, while the Donjaci are descended from Leka's stepson, Radivoj Liješević from Piperi clan.

Ceklin is a tribal community whose folk tradition maintains that was formed through matrilineal descent as its matriarch was married and had offspring with a man from the area of later Piperi and then her second husband came from the area of Kelmendi. The brotherhoods which claim descent from them, the Gornjaci (via the second marriage) and Donjaci (via the first) are the core of Old Ceklin. Many brotherhoods of different origins were eventually incorporated in the community and came to consider themselves to be part of the same lineages. In the 17th and 18th centuries the tribe expanded its region and numerous other villages and families fell within its territory. Ceklin is one of the very few tribes in the Western Balkans that was created through matrilineality, instead of patriarchal bonds.

== Name ==
It has been linguistically connected to Albanian ceklinë or cektinë which means shallow ground.

== Geography ==
The tribe seat is at the village of Ceklin, which comprises thirteen clans. Other villages in the tribal region are: Strugari, Ulići, Bokovo, Jankovići, Đalci, Drušići, Rvaši, Zagora, Bobija, Vranjina, Dujeva (with smaller hamlets: Mihaljevići, Trnovi Do and Riječani), town of Žabljak Crnojevića and at the end of the territory known as Riječka Okolina and Varošica Rijeka in which there are other tribes present.

== Origins ==
The brotherhoods of Ceklin proper (pravi Ceklin) are divided in the Gornjaci and Donjaci brotherhoods. The Gornjaci are most numerous brotherhood of Ceklin today. They share the same matrilineal origin from Piperi, but have different patrilineal descent from Kelmendi (Gornjaci) and Piperi (Donjaci). Thus, Ceklin became a tribe (pleme) on the basis of matrilineal descent, although it follows patrilineal inheritance customs. It follows taboos of endogamy in the same way as a community based on patrilineal descent and no intermarriage takes place between the Donjaci and the Gornjaci.

The Gornjaci brotherhoods, according to their folklore, trace their origin to a Leka, who migrated from Kelmendi (in northern Albania) first in Piperi and then in Ceklin at the end of 15th century. Leka had married the widow of chieftain Radivoj Liješević in Piperi, with whom he had a son, Krstić, whose two sons Lješ and Vulić are the direct ancestors of Gornjaci today. The widow's son from her first marriage, Vukosav, was adopted by Leka and given part of Ceklin. A possibly related oral tradition exists in Kelmendi itself. There, a Leka is considered the fifth son of the progenitor of Kelmendi who first settled in their home territory. According to the story he left from Kelmendi towards an unknown destination - likely Piperi - possibly because of a blood feud. He was already married and had a son when he left. His descendants in Kelmendi are the brotherhoods of Vrataj and Gjonaj. Like the Kelmendi of Selcë, the Gornjaci have St. Nicholas as their patron saint.

According to Donjaci folklore, Liješ, ancestor of Radivoj Liješević was from Drobnjaci. He settled in Piperi in ca. 1385 because of a murder he had committed in his home region. The Donjaci clans originate from two of Vukosav's sons, Bajo and Grujica and they have St. George (Đurđevdan) as their patron saint (slava).

The "old" Ceklinjani (Gornjaci and Donjaci) did not allow the immigrant families in Ceklin to take part in the settlement of new territory. As the Gornjaci were the bigger brotherhood they took most of the new territory as their property. In the brotherhoods of the expanded territory of Ceklin in the 18th as new families came, more than 50 families and brotherhoods traced their origin outside of pravi Ceklin or the brotherhoods of Bokovo and Ulji.

== History ==
In the area of modern Ceklin the settlement of Arbanas is mentioned in 1296 in a letter by King Milutin. During the reign of the Crnojević family in Zeta, old Ceklin was named Donje Dobro, while neighbouring Gornje Dobro later received the name Dobrsko Selo. These names are attested in Ottoman defters from the beginning of the 16th century and in Mariano Bolizza's 1614 report. At the time of Ivan Crnojević, Ceklin was only the name of one single settlement. In the charters of Ivan Crnojević from 1485 and 1489, the village of Ceklin is named Cvetlin (Цвѣтлин) and Cetlin (Цѣтлин), which are the first mentions of the village with this name. The 1489 charters mentions the "nobility of Cetlin", Radič Rašković, Radelja Mirujević, Sćepan Nikolić and Vuk Piperović.

Ceklin belonged to Riječka nahija (Rijeka district), one of the four areas that comprised Old Montenegro. The pravi (proper) Ceklinjani inhabited old (stari) Ceklin, a small area beneath the Ceklinštak mountain, divided into Gornji kraj (Upper area) and Donji kraj (Lower area), after which the main communities of Ceklin take their names: Gornjaci and Donjaci. All older clans of the tribe were formed in this area. The tribe expanded its borders in the 17th century, pushing the Bjelice tribe out from what is now Ceklin. Some communities like Bokovo and Ulji became part of Ceklin on the basis of a defense pact between them. The region expanded in the 18th and early 19th centuries. Ceklin was involved in one of the most long-standing blood feuds in Montenegro against the tribe of Njeguši to which the later ruling dynasty of Montenegro the Petrović-Njegoš belonged. The feud lasted for 32 years and ended in 1797 in a joint meeting of all tribes of Old Montenegro under vladika Petar I Petrović-Njegoš. The pacification of the feud between two of strongest tribes of the region is considered as an important step in Petar Petrović's strategy of uniting Old Montenegro.

The vojvodas and serdars of the tribe were up to mid-19th century members of the Đurašković clan. During the reign of Prince Danilo, the title of vojvoda was passed to the Strugari clan, and the title of serdar to the Jovićević clan.

== Brotherhoods ==
- The Gornjaci all have the slava (feast day) of Nikoljdan (St. Nicholas), and include the local clans of Đurašković, Janković, Kostić, Tatar (earlier Radovanović and Vodičanin), Zarlija, Jovićević, Pejović, Šofranac, Ražnatović.
- The Donjaci all have the slava of Đurđevdan (St. George), and include the local clans of Vujanović (Vujanović, Kovač, Marković, Mašanović and Petričević), Strugar (Mihailović, Pavićević, Ćiraković, Petrović, Nikolić, Todorović and Dragićević), Vukmirović, Kraljević, Dragojević and Lopičić.
- The brotherhoods of Bokovo (Bokovljani) and Ulji (Ulići) choose to become part of Ceklin in the 17th century to better defend their villages. The brotherhoods of Bukovo include the Mudreše-Margetići (slava of Spasovdan), Radivojević or Borozan-Lompar (slava of Spasovdan) and Bušković (slava of Nikoljdan).
- Brotherhoods that settled or became part of Ceklin as it expanded since the 18th century.

=== Families ===
Gornjaci

- Đurašković, descending from Đuraš Lješević
  - Adrović, descending from Andro Đurašković(emigrated from Ceklin)
- Janković, descending from Janko Lješević
- Kostić, descending from Kosta Lješević
- Tatar (earlier Radovanovići and Vodičani), descending from Radovan Lješević
- Zarlija, descending from Novak Lješević
- Jovićević, descending from Jović Vuković
- Pejović, descending from Pejo Vuković
- Šofranac, descending from Šako Vuković
- Ražnatović, descending from Ražnat Vuličević

Donjaci

- Vujanović, descending from Vujan Bajović
  - Vujanović
  - Kovač
  - Marković
  - Mašanović
  - Petričević
- Strugar, descending from Mijat Bajović
  - Mihailović
  - Pavićević
  - Ćiraković
  - Petrović
  - Nikolić
  - Todorović
  - Dragićević
- Vukmirović, descending from Vukmir Grujičić
  - Vukmirović
  - Kraljević
  - Dragojević
- Lopičić, descending from Boriša Grujičić

Bokovljani

- Mudreša and Maretić, in Bokovo: hailing from Spuž, slava of Spasovdan (earlier Đurđic; Sv. Stefan)
- Radivojević, divided into Borozan and Lompar families, in Bokovo: descending from Radivoje from Crmnica, slava of Spasovdan (earlier Đurđic)
- Bušković, in Vranjina: descending from Bojović family from Nikšić

Later immigrants

- Ulić, divided into Đikanović and Vuksanović families, in Gornji Ulići: descending from Mrke from Piperi, slava of Aranđelovdan (earlier Petrovdan)
- Gazivoda: descending from Drugović family from Njeguši, slava of Nikoljdan
- Pavišić, in Rijeka Crnojevića: descending from Paviša Gvozdenović from Ćeklići, slava of Đurđevdan (earlier Ilindan)
- Cijanović, in Rijeka Crnojevića: settled from Žabljak in ca. 1750.
- Various smaller clans, settled since the 18th century mostly in conquered territory.

There are also many families in other tribes that emigrated from Ceklin.

== Notable people ==
- Kenjo Janković, Montenegrin rebel and military leader
- Srđan Lopičić, Montenegrin footballer
- Filip Vujanović, Montenegrin president
- Andrija Lompar, Montenegrin politician
- Branko Kostić, Montenegin Serb politician
- Vlado Strugar, Serbian historian and academic
- Pavle Strugar, Montenegrin general charged for war crimes
- Ivan Strugar, Montenegrin kickboxer
- Veljko Ražnatović, a Colonel in the Yugoslav Air Force
- Željko Ražnatović Arkan, Serbian paramilitary leader and criminal
- Anastasija Ražnatović, (25 May 1998) Serbian singer
- Radovan Jovićević, Serbian pop rock\folk music composer
- Joanikije Lipovac, Metropolitan of Montenegro
- Ranko Borozan, Yugoslav footballer
- Marko Baša, Montenegrin footballer
- Miloš Karadaglić, Montenegrin classical guitarist
- Petar Mudreša, Serbian footballer
- Aleksandar Šofranac, Montenegrin football player
- Marko Mašanović, Montenegrin revolutionary
- Petar Strugar, Montenegrin and Serbian actor and presenter
- Milo Lompar, Montenegrin and Serbian, literary historian

== Annotations ==
1. Such as Bajkovići, Banovići, Bjelice, Božovići, Borišići, Brnovići, Vojvodići, Vujovići, Vukaševići, Vukićevići, Vukotići, Vukčevići, Vuletići, Generalovići, Dapčevići, Draškovići, Đurišići, Jablani, Jokmanovići, Kažije, Kaluđerovići, Klikovci, Klimovići, Kneževići, Kojičići, Kolini, Krstovići, Lađići, Lepetići, Maraši, Markovići, Mikilji, Milanovići, Milaševići, Milonjići, Nikići, Nikolići, Pavlićevići, Pajovići, Pejovići, Steševići, Perovići, Petrovići, Popovići, Počeci, Radanovići, Radomani, Radunovići, Radusini, Rađenovići, Sjekloće, Terzići, Đeletići, Ulićevići, Heraci, Cmolovići, Čelebići, Šanovići.

== Sources ==
- Babić, Nebojša (2016). "Братства племена Цеклин". Poreklo.
- Borozan, Mihailo P. (1960). Prilog istorijskog prošlosti Ceklinskog plemena: (Bokovo od naseljenja do 1941 god.).
- Erdeljanović, Jovan (1926). Стара Црна Гора. Belgrade: SANU.
- Jovićević, Andrija (1911). Ријечка нахија у Црној Гори.
- Jovićević, Andrija (1999) [1926]. Zeta i Lješkopolje, Skadarsko jezero. CID. ISBN 9788649500907.
- Lopičić, Janko K. (1973). Lopićići bratstvo u Ceklinu (Crna Gora), 1450-1970: prilog istoriji plemena Ceklina. Obod.
- Stanojević, Gligor; Vasić, Milan (1975). Istorija Crne Gore (3): od početka XVI do kraja XVIII vijeka. Titograd: Redakcija za istoriju Crne Gore. OCLC 799489791.
