= Arkan =

Serbian paramilitary commander and mobster (1952–2000)

Željko Ražnatović
- Жељко Ражнатовић
- Ražnatović in 1995

Member of the National Assembly
- In office 25 January 1993 – 20 October 1993
- President: Zoran Lilić; Zoran Aranđelović

Personal details
- Born: 17 April 1952 Brežice, PR Slovenia, Yugoslavia
- Died: 15 January 2000 (aged 47) Belgrade, Serbia, FR Yugoslavia
- Cause of death: Assassination
- Resting place: Belgrade New Cemetery
- Party: Party of Serbian Unity (1993–2000)
- Spouses: Natalija Martinović (m. 1994, divorced) Svetlana "Ceca" Veličković (m. 1995)
- Children: 9, including Anastasija
- Relatives: Veljko Ražnatović (father)
- Awards: Order of Karađorđe Star
- Nickname: Arkan

Military service
- Allegiance: FR Yugoslavia; Serbian Krajina; Republika Srpska
- Branch/service: Yugoslav People's Army (until 1992); Army of Republika Srpska (1992–1995)
- Years of service: 1991–1996
- Rank: Commander
- Unit: Arkan Tigers
- Battles/wars: Croatian War of Independence; 1991 Yugoslav campaign in Croatia; Battle of Vukovar; Battle of Jasenovac; Battle for Antunovac; Battle of Ernestinovo; Battle of Osijek; Siege of Dubrovnik; Siege of Slunj; Battles for Bogdanovci; Battle of Nuštar; Operation Steel '93; Bosnian War; 1992 Yugoslav campaign in Bosnia; Capture of Bijeljina; Capture of Zvornik; Capture of Višegrad; Defense of Foča; Operation Corridor 92; Operation Famos; Operation Spider 94; Siege of Goražde; Siege of Žepa; Siege of Srebrenica; Mala Kladuša offensive; Operation Krivaja 95; Operation Una 95; Operation Sana; Battle of Ilidža; Operation Prijedor 95
- Criminal information
- Criminal charge: see ICTY indictment section below
- Penalty: No (assassinated)

Željko Ražnatović (Serbian Cyrillic: Жељко Ражнатовић, pronounced [ʒêːʎko raʒnâːtoʋitɕ]; 17 April 1952 – 15 January 2000), better known as Arkan (Serbian Cyrillic: Аркан), was a Serbian warlord, mobster and head of the Serb Volunteer Guard during the Yugoslav Wars, considered one of the most feared and effective paramilitary forces during the wars. His paramilitary unit was responsible for numerous crimes in Eastern Bosnia, including murder, pillaging, rape and ethnic cleansings. Arkan was one of the most feared, celebrated and iconic figures in Serbia during his time.

Arkan was on Interpol's top 10 most wanted list in the 1970s and 1980s for robberies and murders committed in countries across Europe, he escaped jail twice, and was later indicted by the International Criminal Tribunal for the former Yugoslavia for crimes against humanity. Up until his assassination in January 2000, Ražnatović was the most powerful organised crime figure in the Balkans, as well as the most powerful state-sponsored gangster in Serbia. Ražnatović had links to Avraham Golan, an infamous security contractor.

== Early life ==
Željko Ražnatović was born in Brežice, a small border town in Lower Styria, PR Slovenia, FPR Yugoslavia. His father, Veljko Ražnatović, a Montenegrin Serb, served as a decorated officer in the Yugoslav Air Force, being highly ranked for his notable involvement in World War II. Veljko was stationed in Slovenian Styria at the time when his fourth child Željko was born.

Infant Ražnatović spent part of his childhood in Zagreb and Pančevo before his father's job eventually took the family to the Yugoslav capital of Belgrade, which is considered his hometown. He grew up with three older sisters in a strict, militaristic patriarchal household with regular physical abuse from his father. In a 1991 interview, he recalled: "He didn't really hit me in a classical sense, he'd basically grab me and slam me against the floor." As a child, Ražnatović was considered to be a "problem child" by his teachers who regularly complained of his unruly behavior.

In his youth, Ražnatović aspired to become a pilot, as his father had been. Due to the highly demanding and significant positions of his parents, there appeared to be very little time in which a bond was able to be established between parents and children. His parents eventually divorced during his teenage years.

Ražnatović was arrested for the first time in 1966 for snatching women's purses around Tašmajdan Park, spending a year at a juvenile detention centre not far from Belgrade. His father then sent him to the seaside town of Kotor in order to join the Yugoslav Navy, but Ražnatović had other plans (ending up in Paris at the age of 15). In 1969, Ražnatović was arrested by French police and deported home, where he was sentenced to three years at a detention centre in Valjevo for several burglaries. During this time, he organised his own gang in the prison.

In his youth, Ražnatović was a ward of his father's friend, the Slovenian politician and Federal Minister of the Interior, Stane Dolanc. Dolanc was chief of the Directorate for State Security (UDBA) and a close associate of President Josip Broz Tito. Whenever Ražnatović was in trouble, Dolanc helped him, allegedly as a reward for his services to the UDBA, as seen in the escape from the Lugano prison in 1981. Dolanc is quoted as having said: "One Arkan is worth more than the whole UDBA."

== Criminal career ==
=== Western Europe ===
In 1972, aged 20, Ražnatović migrated to Western Europe. Abroad, he was introduced to and kept contact with many well-known criminals from Yugoslavia, such as Ljuba Zemunac, Ranko Rubežić, Đorđe "Giška" Božović, and Goran Vuković, all of whom were also occasionally contracted by the UDBA, and all of whom have since been assassinated or otherwise died. Ražnatović took the nickname "Arkan" from one of his forged passports. On 28 December 1973, he was arrested in Belgium following a bank robbery, and was sentenced to ten years in prison. In 1974, Ražnatović was active in Sweden and among other crimes robbed a bank in Kungälv.

Ražnatović managed to escape from the Verviers prison on 4 July 1979. Although he was apprehended in the Netherlands on 24 October 1979, the few months he was free were enough for at least two more armed robberies in Sweden and three more in the Netherlands. Serving a seven-year sentence at a prison in Amsterdam, Ražnatović pulled off another escape on 8 May 1981 after someone slipped him a gun. Wasting no time, more robberies followed, this time in West Germany, where after less than a month of freedom he was arrested in Frankfurt on 5 June 1981 following a jewellery store stickup. In the ensuing shootout with police he was lightly wounded, resulting in his placement in the prison hospital ward. Looser security allowed Ražnatović to escape again only four days later, on 9 June, supposedly by jumping from the window, beating up the first passerby and stealing his clothing before disappearing. His final Western European arrest occurred in Basel, Switzerland, during a routine traffic check on 15 February 1983. However, he managed to escape again within months, this time from Thorberg Prison on 27 April.

It is widely speculated that Ražnatović was closely affiliated with the UDBA throughout his criminal career abroad. He had convictions or warrants in Belgium (bank robberies, prison escape), the Netherlands (armed robberies, prison escape), Sweden (twenty burglaries, seven bank robberies, prison escape, attempted murder), West Germany (armed robberies, prison escape), Austria, Switzerland (armed robberies, prison escape), and Italy. Ražnatović had achieved the status in the Belgrade underworld of earning "strahopoštovanje", a Serbo-Croatian phrase that roughly translates as being "respected for fear". Strahopoštovanje was generally achieved in the Yugoslav underworld by committing violent crimes in Western Europe, being arrested and convicted, serving a sentence in a Western European prison, and terrorising the other inmates to such an extent that the said criminal became the most feared inmate in the prison. In the macho world of the Yugoslav underworld, having strahopoštovanje status was seen as proof of a criminal's toughness and masculinity.

=== Return to Yugoslavia ===
Ražnatović returned to Belgrade in May 1983, continuing his criminal career by managing a number of illegal activities. In November of that year, six months after his return, a bank in Zagreb was robbed with the thieves leaving a rose on the counter (allegedly Ražnatović's signature from his robberies in Western Europe). Looking to question Ražnatović about his whereabouts during the robbery, two policemen, members of the Secretariat of Internal Affairs' (SUP) Tenth department from the Belgradian municipality of Palilula, showed up in civilian clothing at his mother's flat on 27 March Street in Belgrade. Ražnatović happened to not be home at the moment, so the policemen introduced themselves to his mother as "friends of her son looking to return a cash debt they owed him" and asked the woman if they could wait for him to return to the flat. Ražnatović's mother phoned him to say that two unknown males waited for him. Ražnatović showed up with a revolver and proceeded to shoot and wound both policemen. He was detained immediately; however, barely 48 hours later, he was released. The occurrence made it clear to all observers, especially his criminal rivals, that he enjoyed protection from the highest echelons of the Yugoslav state security establishment.

Ražnatović spent the mid-1980s running the Amadeus discothèque together with Žika Živac and Tapi Malešević. Located in the Tašmajdan neighbourhood, the nightclub was reportedly another perk of their contractual work for the UDBA. Moreover, Ražnatović could be seen driving around Belgrade in a pink Cadillac and gambling on roulette in casinos all over the country, from Belgrade (Hotel Slavija) and nearby Pančevo to Sveti Stefan (Hotel Maestral on the Miločer beach) and Portorož (Hotel Metropol).

An avid gambler, following a private game of poker in a flat at Ive Lole Ribara Street in Belgrade, Ražnatović got into a lift altercation with a tenant from the flat building, reportedly breaking the man's arm after beating him with a gun. Ražnatović could not avoid being charged this time and the trial saw a notable exchange between him and the judge; during the pre-session identification, Ražnatović stated he was an employee of the Secretariat of Internal Affairs (SUP). When this was challenged by the prosecutor, Ražnatović produced a document summarising a mortgage loan he obtained from the UDBA for his house at Ljutice Bogdana Street. He ended up receiving a six-month sentence, which he served at the Belgrade Central Prison. In the late 1980s, a football hooligan subculture had emerged in Yugoslavia and the unruly and rowdy fans of the Red Star Belgrade football team were seen as a major social problem. At the request of the Ministry of the Interior, Ražnatović took over the Delije (transl. Heroes) fan club of Red Star Belgrade in an attempt to impose some control on the hooligans. Ražnatović quickly became a hero to the Delije club by his ability to arrange for them to go to Western Europe whenever Red Star Belgrade played a game in a Western European city.

== Yugoslav Wars ==
=== Early ===
Only days after the 1990 Croatian multi-party election, Ražnatović, who was the leader of the Delije (hooligan supporters of the football club Red Star Belgrade), was present at the away game against Croatian side Dinamo Zagreb at Stadion Maksimir on 13 May, a match that ended in the infamous Dinamo–Red Star riot. Ražnatović and the Delije, consisting of 1,500 people, were involved in a massive fight with the home team's football hooligans, the Bad Blue Boys. On 11 October 1990, as the political situation in Yugoslavia became tense, Ražnatović created a paramilitary group named the Serb Volunteer Guard. Ražnatović was the supreme commander of the unit, which was primarily made up of members of the Delije and his personal friends.

In late October 1990, Ražnatović traveled to Knin to meet representatives of the SAO Krajina, a Serb break-away region that sought to remain in FR Yugoslavia, as opposed to the Croatian government that seceded. On 29 November, Croatian police arrested him at the Croatian-Bosnian border crossing Dvor na Uni along with local Dušan Carić and Belgraders Dušan Bandić and Zoran Stevanović. Ražnatović's entourage was sent to Sisak and was charged with conspiracy to overthrow the newly formed Croatian state. Ražnatović was sentenced to twenty months in jail. He was released from Zagreb's Remetinec prison on 14 June 1991. It has been claimed that the Croatian and Serbian governments agreed on a DM1 million settlement for his release.

In July 1991, Ražnatović stayed for some time at the Cetinje Monastery with Metropolitan of Montenegro Amfilohije Radović. His group of men, fully armed, were allowed to enter the monastery, where they served as security before travelling to the Siege of Dubrovnik.

=== War ===
"Arkan" and his Tigers, photographed by Ron Haviv in 1992.

The Serb Volunteer Guard, also known as "Arkan's Tigers", was organised as an elite paramilitary force supporting the Serb armies, set up in a former military facility in Erdut. The force, led by Ražnatović and Milorad Ulemek, consisted of a core of 600 men and perhaps totaled more than 5,000 soldiers, and it was much feared by the public. Under Arkan's command the SDG massacred hundreds of people in eastern Croatia and Bosnia and Herzegovina. It saw action from mid-1991 until late 1995, and was supplied and equipped privately, by the reserves of the Serbian police force or through capturing enemy arms.

When the Croatian War of Independence broke out in 1991, the SDG was active in the Vukovar region, committing crimes against Croat and Hungarian civilians in Dalj, Erdut, Tenja and other areas. After the Bosnian War broke out in April 1992, the unit moved between the Croatian and Bosnian fronts, engaging in multiple instances of ethnic cleansing by killing and forcefully deporting mostly Bosniak civilians. In Croatia, it fought in various areas in SAO Eastern Slavonia, Baranja and Western Syrmia. Ražnatović, reportedly, had a dispute over military operations with Krajina leader Milan Martić. In Bosnia, the SDG notably fought in battles in and around Zvornik, Bijeljina and Brčko, mostly against Bosniak and Bosnian Croat paramilitary groups, including killings of civilians.

Ražnatović was favored by the Serbian authorities because as a gangster and a football hooligan he seemed to have no political ambitions and hence posed no threat to the regime of Slobodan Milošević. However, he started to show signs of wanting to move beyond organised crime, founding his own political party, the Party for Serbian Unity, in 1992. He also became the owner of the casino in the Hotel Jugoslavija along with a radio station, a shipping company and a brand of wine named Erdut after the base of the Tiger militia. The SDG served as much of a criminal organisation as a para-military group, and was involved in smuggling petrol into Serbia from Romania and Bulgaria in defiance of the United Nations sanctions imposed on Serbia in May 1992. Ražnatović's petrol smuggling brought him into conflict with Marko Milošević, the son of Slobodan, who from 1994 onwards was said to be trying to monopolise the petrol smuggling. In the summer of 1995, the Serbian state curtailed the supply of arms to the SDG, which was said to have been a punishment for competing with Marko Milošević.

In late 1995, Ražnatović's troops fought in the area of Banja Luka, Sanski Most and Prijedor. In October 1995, he left Sanski Most as the Army of the Republic of Bosnia and Herzegovina reclaimed the city. Ražnatović personally led most of the operations, and rewarded his most efficient officers and soldiers with ranks, medals and eventually looted goods. Several younger soldiers were rewarded for their actions in and around Kopački Rit and Bijelo Brdo. Ražnatović reportedly sent one of his most trusted men, Radovan Stanišić, to Italy to start a relationship with Camorra boss Francesco Schiavone. According to Roberto Saviano, Schiavone eased arms smuggling to Serbia by stopping the Albanian mobsters' blocking of weapons routes, and helped money transfer into Serbia in the form of humanitarian aid amid the international sanctions. In exchange, the Camorra acquired companies, enterprises, shops and farms in Serbia at optimal prices.

Ražnatović has been accused of kidnapping and conscripting Serb refugees from Bosnia and Croatia. After Operation Storm in Croatia resulted in the collapse of the Republic of Serbian Krajina and an exodus of Serb refugees, the Serbian Interior Ministry rounded up over 5,000 refugees to conscript into the SDG. Military-aged men were forcibly rounded up after arriving in Serbia by local police and then sent a to detention camp in Erdut against their will and without informing their families. Once in Erdut, the refugees' heads were shaved and their valuables were confiscated. The men were then subjected to days of physical and psychological torture from SDG guards, which included extreme physical exercises, routine beatings, and humiliating acts. Ražnatović gaving speeches accusing the refugees of being cowards and traitors, blaming them for the RSK's fall. Belgrade's Humanitarian Law Centre has represented over 100 people suing the state of Serbia for forced mobilisation.

== Post-war fame ==
Ražnatović came to serve as a popular icon for both Serbs and their enemies. For some Serbs, he was a patriot and folk hero, while serving as an object of hatred and fear to Croats and Bosniaks. In the postwar period after the Dayton Agreement was signed, Ražnatović returned to his interests in sport and private business. The SDG was officially disbanded in April 1996, with the threat of being reactivated in case of war. In June of that year he took over a second division football team, FK Obilić, which he soon turned into a top caliber club, even winning the 1997–98 FR Yugoslav League championship.

According to Franklin Foer, in his book How Soccer Explains the World, Ražnatović threatened players on opposing teams if they scored against Obilić. This threat was underlined by the thousands of SDG veterans that filled his team's home field, chanting threats, and on occasion pointing pistols at opposing players during matches. One player told the British football magazine FourFourTwo that he was locked in a garage when his team played Obilić. Europe's football governing body, the Union of European Football Associations (UEFA), considered prohibiting Obilić from participation in continental competitions because of its connections to Ražnatović. In response to this, Ražnatović stepped away from the position of president and gave his seat to his wife Svetlana. In a 2006 interview, Dragoslav Šekularac (who was coach of Obilić while Ražnatović was with the club) said claims that Ražnatović verbally and physically assaulted Obilić players were false. Ražnatović was a chairman of the Yugoslav Kickboxing Association.

Many of the former members of "Arkan's Tigers" are prominent figures in Serbia, maintaining close ties between each other and with Russian nationalist organisations. Jugoslav Simić and Svetozar Pejović posed with Russian Night Wolves, Ceca performed for Vladimir Putin during his visit in Serbia, Srđan Golubović is a popular trance performer known as "DJ Max" and was identified by Rolling Stone as the SDG soldier kicking dead bodies of a Bosniak family in Bijeljina on a photo from 1992. Ražnatović came to take on the attributes of a hajduk (the term for a Serb bandit during the Ottoman empire), and he was celebrated in "militaristic nationalist circles" for his criminal-military exploits. The German political writer Klaus Schlichte wrote that Ražnatović was the "most military" of the various Serb para-military leaders in the Bosnian war, and that his primary motive in the war was greed as he seemed all too interested in looting. However, Schlichte noted that Ražnatović's attempts at political career and his frequent appearances to the Serb media suggest he had wider ambitions beyond greed.

== Kosovo War and NATO bombing ==
According to chief judge Richard May from the United Kingdom, the International Criminal Tribunal for the former Yugoslavia issued an indictment against Ražnatović on 30 September 1997 for war crimes of genocide or massacre against the Bosniak population, crimes against humanity and grave breaches of the Geneva Conventions. The warrant was not made public until 31 March 1999, a week after the NATO bombing of Yugoslavia had begun, as intervention in the Kosovo War. Ražnatović's indictment was made public by the UN court's chief prosecutor Louise Arbour. In the week before the start of NATO bombing, as the Rambouillet talks collapsed, Ražnatović appeared at the Hyatt hotel in Belgrade, where most Western journalists were staying, and ordered all of them to leave Serbia.

During the NATO bombing, Ražnatović denied the war crime charges against him in interviews he gave to foreign reporters. Ražnatović accused NATO of bombing civilians and creating refugees of all ethnicities, and stated that he would deploy his troops only in the case of a direct NATO ground invasion. After the United States bombing of the Chinese embassy in Belgrade, which killed three journalists and led to a diplomatic row between the United States and China, The Observer and Politiken newspapers claimed the building might have been targeted because the office of the Chinese military attaché was being used by Ražnatović to communicate and transmit messages to his paramilitary group in Kosovo. As neither paper offered any proof for this claim it was largely ignored by the media.

During an interview with Western journalists, while the three-month period of the NATO bombing was ongoing, Ražnatović showed a small rubber part of the F-117A downed by the Yugoslav army (one of only five NATO aircraft destroyed on 38,000 sorties), which he had taken as "a souvenir"; Yugoslav media falsely proclaimed that Ražnatović had downed the stealth fighter.

== ICTY indictment and proceedings ==
In March 1999, the Prosecutor of the International Criminal Tribunal for the former Yugoslavia (ICTY) announced that Ražnatović had been indicted by the Tribunal, although the indictment was only made public after his assassination. According to the indictment, Ražnatović was to have been prosecuted on 24 charges of crimes against humanity (Art. 5 ICTY Statute), grave breaches of the Geneva Conventions (Art. 2 ICTY Statute) and violations of the laws of war (Art. 3 ICTY Statute), for the following acts:

- Forcibly detaining approximately thirty non-Serb men and one woman, without food or water, in an inadequately ventilated boiler room of approximately five square metres (54 sq ft) in size.
- Transporting twelve non-Serb men from Sanski Most to an isolated location in the village of Trnova, where eleven of the men were shot and killed and the twelfth was critically wounded.
- Transporting approximately sixty-seven Bosniak men from Sanski Most, Šehovci, and Pobriježe to an isolated location in the village of Sasina, and shooting them, killing sixty-five of the captives and wounding two survivors.
- Forcibly detaining approximately thirty-five Muslim Bosnian men in an inadequately ventilated room of about five square metres (54 sq ft) in size, withholding from them food and water, resulting in the deaths of two men.
- The rape of a Muslim woman on a bus outside the Hotel Sanus in Sanski Most.

Following Ražnatović's assassination in 2000, ICTY Prosecutor Carla Del Ponte said she was "confident, however, that other persons who shared responsibility with [him] for his crimes will ultimately be brought to justice."

== Assassination ==
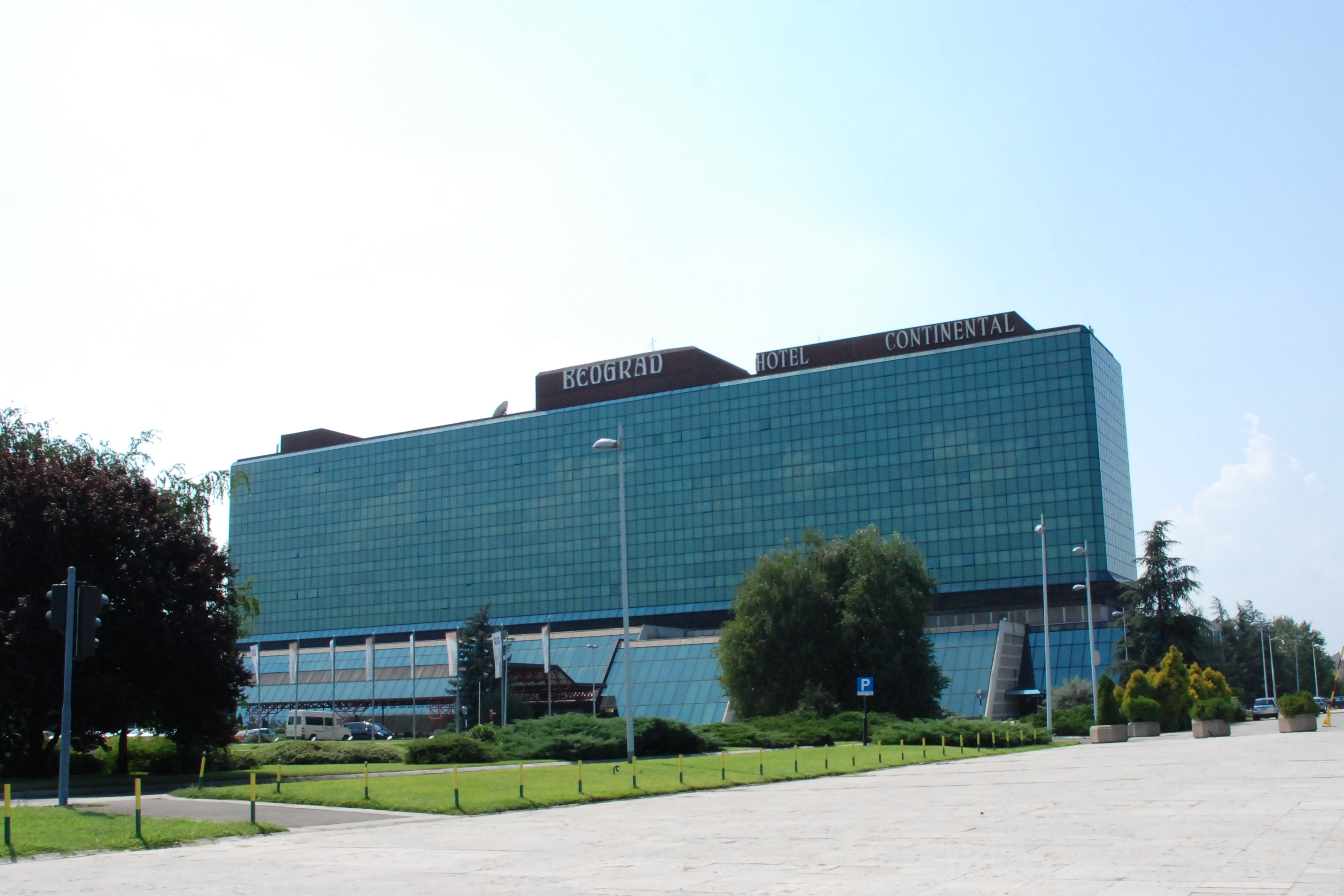
Hotel InterContinental

In the late 1990s, Ražnatović became an isolated figure in Belgrade who rarely went outside without his bodyguards. Between 1995–2000, there were over 500 gangland murders in Belgrade, virtually none of which were solved by the police. A number of the gangsters killed were associates of Ražnatović, which was seen as a sign that he had lost his political protection. Together with his wife, Ražnatović virtually lived in the lounges of international hotels in Belgrade, apparently out of the hope he would not be killed in a place where so many foreign journalists were present.

Ražnatović was assassinated, 15 January 2000, 17:05 GMT, in the lobby of the Hotel InterContinental in New Belgrade, in a location where he was surrounded by other hotel guests. The killer, Dobrosav Gavrić, a 23-year-old junior police mobile brigade member, had ties to the underworld and was on sick leave at the time. He walked up alone toward his target from behind. Ražnatović was sitting and chatting with two friends and, according to BBC Radio, was filling out a betting slip. Gavrić waited for a few minutes, calmly walked up behind the party, and rapidly fired a succession of bullets from his CZ99 pistol. Ražnatović was hit in his left eye and became unconscious on the spot. His bodyguard Zvonko Mateović put him into a car, and rushed him to a hospital; he died on the way.

According to his widow Svetlana, Ražnatović died in her arms as they were driving to hospital. His companions Milenko Mandić, a business manager, and Dragan Garić, a police inspector, were also shot dead by Gavrić, who in turn was shot and wounded by Mateović. A female bystander was also seriously wounded in the shootout. After complicated surgery, Gavrić survived, but was paralyzed from the waist down.

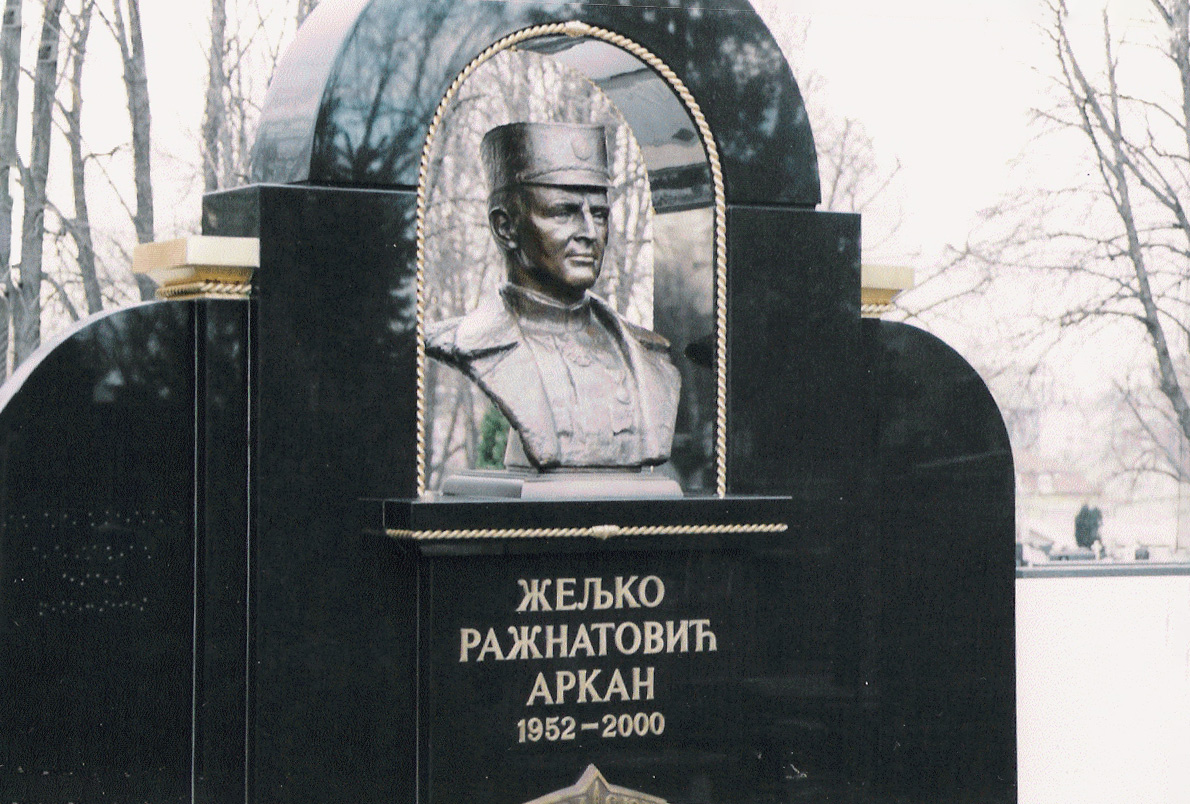
Ražnatović's grave and bust

A memorial ceremony in Ražnatović's honour was held on 19 January 2000, with writer Branislav Crnčević, Yugoslav Left official Aleksandar Vulin, singers Oliver Mandić, Toni Montano, and Zoran Kalezić, along with the entire first team of FK Obilić, including club director Dragoslav Šekularac, in attendance. Ražnatović was buried at the Belgrade New Cemetery with military honours by his volunteers and with funeral rites on 20 January 2000. Sources dispute the number of people that attended, but most sources state between 2,000 to 10,000 people attended the funeral.

=== Trials ===
Dobrosav Gavrić pleaded not guilty but was convicted and sentenced to nineteen years in prison. His accomplices received from three to fifteen years each, after a year-long trial in 2002. However, the district court verdict was overturned by the Supreme Court because of "lack of evidence and vagueness of the first trial process". A new trial was conducted in 2006, ending on 9 October 2006 with guilty verdicts upheld for Gavrić as well as his accomplices, Milan Đuričić and Dragan Nikolić. Gavrić was sentenced to thirty years in prison, as well as Đuričić and Nikolić, for murder in complicity.

Prior to carrying out his sentence, however, Gavrić obtained a passport from Bosnia and Herzegovina under the name Saša Kovačević and fled Serbia. In March 2011, he was driving a crime boss, Cyril Beeka, in Cape Town, South Africa when a gunman on a motorcycle opened fire on them, killing Beeka and wounding Gavrić. Cocaine was found in the vehicle they were in, leading to Gavrić being fingerprinted and his true identity discovered. Since that time, he has been incarcerated in South Africa and fighting his extradition to Serbia where his 2006 sentence awaits him. As of February 2021, he is still fighting his extradition to Serbia in South African courts.

== Personal life ==
=== Family ===
Ražnatović fathered nine children by five different women. His eldest son Mihajlo was born in Gothenburg, in 1975, from a relationship with a Swedish woman. In 1992, 17-year-old Mihajlo decided to move to Serbia to live with his father. During this time the teenager was photographed wearing the uniform of his father's paramilitary unit during the Yugoslav Wars and according to a Swedish tabloid report the youngster participated in combat operations in Srebrenica. Mihajlo has since lived in Belgrade where he played for the Red Star Belgrade ice-hockey club off and on between 2000 and 2009, also representing Serbia-Montenegro on the national team level between 2002 and 2004. During this time, he also ran a sushi restaurant in Belgrade called Iki Bar and dated Macedonian pop singer Karolina Gočeva. He left Serbia after that. In 2013 he was in the news in Serbia again following the conclusion of a court case that had dragged on since 2005 over Ražnatović's failure to meet the repayment terms on a RSD1.1 million car loan he took out in 2002 from Komercijalna banka. After continually failing to meet his monthly payments, the bank wanted the loan paid off in full in August 2005, and two years later took him to court. In June 2010, he was ordered to pay RSD3.3 million based upon the interest on the original loan. In the end, the verdict stated he owed the bank RSD2.9 million.

In June 1994, sometime after her separation from Ražnatović, Natalija Martinović and their four children left Serbia and moved to Athens, where he bought them a flat in the suburb of Glyfada. After his assassination, Martinović disputed his will, claiming that Svetlana doctored it. In May 2000, she sued Svetlana over Ražnatović's assets, including the villa at Ljutice Bogdana Street in which he and Svetlana lived, claiming it was built with funds from a bank loan Martinović and Ražnatović took out in 1985. The court eventually ruled against Martinović. The court agreed with her assertions that the villa was built with money from a 1985 bank loan taken out by her and Ražnatović, but ruled she had forfeited any rights in future division of that asset when she signed the property over to Ražnatović in 1994 before moving to Greece.

In 2012, Ražnatović's son Vojin Martinović again accused Svetlana of falsifying his father's will. In response, Ražnatović's former associate Borislav Pelević said that the villa at Ljutice Bogdana Street was not mentioned in the will as he had already signed it over to his second wife. Ražnatović and Ceca have a daughter and a son. Their daughter Anastasija sings on her mother's record label, and publishes the songs on YouTube.

=== Religion ===
Ražnatović was a professed Serbian Orthodox Christian and "paid great homage to the Serbian Orthodox Church". He also met with then Serbian Patriarch Pavle on one occasion, when he was gifted with an autographed icon of Saint Nicholas, and was told by Pavle that he was justified in his actions. Ražnatović saw himself as a favourite of Pavle, even viewing him as his "commander", saying that, "we are fighting for our religion, the Serbian Orthodox Church".

== In popular culture ==
- In October 1992, Arkan was confronted by Roger Cook for a special edition of ITV's The Cook Report.
- The History Channel's 2003 documentary Targeted includes a part on Željko Ražnatović, Baby Face Psycho.
- In the 2012 Japanese anime Jormungand, one of the antagonists is Dragan Nikolaevich, commander of the Balkan Dragons. His looks and even his biography bear resounding resemblance to those of Arkan.
- In the 2014 Serbian docu-drama series Dosije: Beogradski klanovi, one of the episodes tells the story of Željko Ražnatović.

== Biographies ==
- Schlichte, Klaus (January 2010). "Na krilima patriotisma—On the Wings of Patriotism: Delegated and Spin-Off Violence in Serbia". Armed Forces & Society. 36 (2): 310–326.
- Stewart, Christopher S. (8 January 2008). Hunting the Tiger: The Fast Life and Violent Death of the Balkans' Most Dangerous Man. Thomas Dunne Books. ISBN 978-0-312-35606-4.
- Vojin Ražnatović (4 July 2014). Stories About My Father: An Intimate Portrayal Of Europe's Most Controversial Paramilitary Commander. CreateSpace Independent Publishing Platform. ISBN 978-1494311209.
- Marko Lopušina (2001). Komandant Arkan (in Serbian). Čačak: Legenda. OCLC 48273593.
- Živorad Lazić. Arkane, Srbine! (in Serbian). Belgrade: Grafiprof.
- Vladan Dinić. Arkan, ni živ ni mrtav (in Serbian). Belgrade.

== Interviews ==
- Interview with Jim Laurie, 23 December 1991. Video on YouTube
- Interview with local Bosnian Serb TV after takeover of Bijeljina, 1992. Video on YouTube (in Serbian)
- Interview with RTV BK, 20 July 1997. Video on YouTube (in Serbian)
- Interview with BBC, 1999. Video on YouTube (in German and Serbian)
- Interview with ABC, 6 April 1999.
- Interview with British reporter John Simpson, March 1999. Video on YouTube
- Interview during NATO bombings, 1999. Video on YouTube (in Serbian)
- Interview with B92, April 1999. Video on YouTube (in Serbian)
