= Tenja killings =

Massacre during the Croatian War of Independence

Tenja massacre
- Part of the Croatian War of Independence
- Tenja on the map of Croatia, JNA/SAO Krajina-held areas in late 1991 are highlighted in red
- Location: Tenja, Croatia
- Date: 7 July - November 1991
- Target: Croats
- Attack type: Mass killing, ethnic cleansing
- Deaths: 29
- Perpetrators: JNA and TO, local Serb rebels, Serbian Volunteer Guard

The Tenja killings was the mass murder of Croat civilians by Serb forces between July and November 1991, in the village of Tenja.

== Background ==
During the Croatian War of Independence, Tenja was under the control of Serb rebel forces. It was a part of the self-proclaimed SAO Eastern Slavonia, Baranja and Western Syrmia (1991–1992), Republic of Serbian Krajina (1992–1995) and United Nations protectorate of Eastern Slavonia, Baranja and Western Syrmia (1995–1998).

== Killings ==
From 7 July until November 1991, Serb forces, including JNA and TO forces (belonging to the Novi Sad Corps), members of the Serbian Volunteer Guard, under the command of Željko Ražnatović "Arkan", and local Serb rebels and police, abused and killed Croat civilians, as part of a campaign to intimidate the non-Serb population into leaving the village.

Croat and other non-Serb civilians were illegally detained in basements in their homes, makeshift prisons and other buildings in the village, where they were kept in unsanitary conditions, brutally beaten, robbed of their valuables, forced to conduct forced labour and were routinely denied food and medication. A number of civilians died under these conditions.

On 7 July 1991, Serb TO forces abducted eleven (mostly elderly) Croat civilians, drove them to the nearby village of Bobota and executed them there.

In July or August 1991, Serb forces detained and murdered seven Croat civilians; their bodies were found in February 1998 in the area of Betin Dvor.

In October 1991, JNA forces imprisoned, interrogated and executed four Croat prisoners.

The Belgrade-based Humanitarian Law Center (HLC) stated that at least 29 Croat and other non-Serb civilians were killed by Serb forces between July and November 1991, dozens more had been illegally detained and abused, in addition to some 3,000 residents who were displaced from the village during the occupation. The bodies of 13 killed persons have not yet been found.

== Aftermath ==
In 2011, the HLC filed a criminal complaint with the Office of the War Crimes Prosecutor of the Republic of Serbia, against 30 individuals for crimes committed in Tenja.

The Tenja case was transferred from Croatia to Serbia on the basis of an agreement on cooperation and prosecution of war crimes, crimes against humanity and genocide signed between the prosecution offices of the two countries signed on October 13, 2006.

Serbian prosecutors charged Božo Vidaković and Žarko Čubrilo, both member of Serb territorial defence units, for committing war crimes, including the killings of 18 civilians and one POW. In 2015, Čubrilo was acquitted in a ruling that was criticized by the HLC.

In 2010, Darko Radivoje was sentenced by a Belgrade court to 10 years imprisonment for war crimes committed in Tenja.
