= Battle of Ilidža =

Battle during the Siege of Sarajevo

- Part of Bosnian War and Siege of Sarajevo
| Date | First battle: 22 April; Second battle: 14 May 1992 |
| Location | Ilidža, Sarajevo |
| Result | Serbian victory in both battles |

Belligerents
| (Socialist Federal Republic of Yugoslavia) SFR Yugoslavia (first battle); Republika Srpska | Republic of Bosnia and Herzegovina (Croatian Republic of Herzeg-Bosnia) Croatian Community of Herzeg-Bosnia |

Commanders and leaders
| Željko Ražnatović | unknown |

Units involved
| Yugoslav People's Army (first battle); Army of Republika Srpska (second battle): (Republika Srpska) Ilidža Brigade; Serb Volunteer Guard | Army of the Republic of Bosnia and Herzegovina; HVO Sarajevo |

Casualties and losses
| 12 killed, 42 wounded (first battle) | Unknown |

The Battle of Ilidža was a battle between the Army of the Republic of Bosnia and Herzegovina and the Yugoslav People's Army for control of Ilidža, a suburb of Sarajevo, during the Bosnian War. In the first battle on 22 April, the Yugoslav People's Army defended Ilidža and expelled the ARBiH and the HVO. On 14 May, the ARBiH and HVO launched another assault on the town but were again defeated, this time by the Army of Republika Srpska. These battles played an important role in the subsequent Siege of Sarajevo.

== Battle ==
=== First attack ===
In the early morning of 22 April 1992, around 05:00, Ilidža was attacked by joint Croatian–Muslim forces. A few minutes later, Serbian soldiers arrived. The ARBiH and the Croatian Defence Council were stopped by Serbian forces at the line of the Swimming Pool, the Institute for Physiatrics, and the Toptola Hotel, and at no point broke through the Serbian defensive line.

The battle ended in the early afternoon when the Croatian–Muslim forces withdrew to their starting positions: Sokolović Kolonija, the Road to Glavogodina, Kovači, and Stojčevac, where they remained until the end of the war. The Serbian side suffered 12 killed and 42 wounded.

=== Second attack ===
After their defeat, Bosniak forces again attacked Ilidža on 14 May 1992. Western media appeared on the scene and filmed the event. Robert Stelios, who was recording, was wounded in the arm by a Bosniak sniper near the Kristal Hotel. Serbs transported him to Belgrade for treatment, after which he returned to London. The ARBiH failed to reach the road at Velika Aleja Street and was again defeated, this time by the newly formed Ilidža Brigade.

== Aftermath ==
Following the Dayton Agreement of 1995, the municipality was divided between Bosniaks (Ilidža Municipality) and Serbs (East Ilidža Municipality). When the town of Ilidža was assigned to the territory of the Federation of Bosnia and Herzegovina, the vast majority of Serbs fled in order to live in Republika Srpska.
