= Battle of Nuštar =

- Part of the Croatian War of Independence
Date	2–12 November 1991
Location	Nuštar, Croatia 45°20′N 18°50′E
Result	Croatian victory

Belligerents
Croatia	(Socialist Federal Republic of Yugoslavia) Yugoslavia (Republic of Serbian Krajina) SAO Krajina

Units involved
Croatian National Guard; Croatian Defence Forces; Croatian Army; Croatian Police	Yugoslav People's Army; Yugoslav Air Force; Krajina Territorial Defense; Serb Volunteer Guard

Strength
400 soldiers	500–1,000 soldiers

Casualties and losses
90 killed	Unknown

The Battle of Nuštar was a major battle during the Croatian War of Independence, fought from the 2nd to the 5th of November 1991 between Croatia and SAO Krajina which was supported by the Yugoslav People’s Army. Nuštar was situated near Vukovar and Vinkovci, it was a major necessity to the Croatian defenders at Vukovar and Vinkovci, due to its road that led to nearby villages and towns, which had supplied the Croats in Vukovar. Nuštar saw major artillery shelling from the Yugoslav People’s Army, along with air strikes conducted by the Yugoslav Air Force. Despite the major bombing and shelling from the Yugoslav People’s Army and the Yugoslav Air Force, The Croatian garrison in Nuštar never fell, but it suffered massive infrastructural damage.

== Background ==
In 1990, ethnic tensions between Serbs and Croats worsened after the electoral defeat of the government of the Socialist Republic of Croatia by the Croatian Democratic Union (Croatian: Hrvatska demokratska zajednica – HDZ). The Yugoslav People's Army (Serbian: Jugoslovenska Narodna Armija – JNA) confiscated Croatia's Territorial Defence (Croatian: Teritorijalna obrana – TO) weapons to minimize resistance. On 17 August, the tensions escalated into an open revolt of the Croatian Serbs, centred on the predominantly Serb-populated areas of the Dalmatian hinterland around Knin (approximately 60 kilometres (37 miles) north-east of Split), parts of the Lika, Kordun, Banovina and eastern Croatia. In January 1991, Serbia, supported by Montenegro and Serbia's provinces of Vojvodina and Kosovo, unsuccessfully tried to obtain the Yugoslav Presidency's approval for a JNA operation to disarm Croatian security forces. The request was denied and a bloodless skirmish between Serb insurgents and Croatian special police in March prompted the JNA itself to ask the Federal Presidency to give it wartime authority and declare a state of emergency. Even though the request was backed by Serbia and its allies, the JNA request was refused on 15 March. Serbian President Slobodan Milošević, preferring a campaign to expand Serbia rather than to preserve Yugoslavia with Croatia as a federal unit, publicly threatened to replace the JNA with a Serbian army and declared that he no longer recognized the authority of the federal Presidency. The threat caused the JNA to abandon plans to preserve Yugoslavia in favour of expansion of Serbia as the JNA came under Milošević's control. By the end of March, the conflict had escalated with the first fatalities. In early April, leaders of the Serb revolt in Croatia declared their intention to amalgamate the areas under their control with Serbia. These were viewed by the Government of Croatia as breakaway regions.

At the beginning of 1991, Croatia had no regular army. To bolster its defence, Croatia doubled its police numbers to about 20,000. The most effective part of the Croatian police force was 3,000-strong special police comprising twelve battalions organised along military lines. There were also 9,000–10,000 regionally organised reserve police in 16 battalions and 10 companies, but they lacked weapons. In response to the deteriorating situation, the Croatian government established the Croatian National Guard (Croatian: Zbor narodne garde – ZNG) in May by expanding the special police battalions into four all-professional guards brigades. Under Ministry of Defence control and commanded by retired JNA General Martin Špegelj, the four guards brigades comprised approximately 8,000 troops. The reserve police, also expanded to 40,000, was attached to the ZNG and reorganised into 19 brigades and 14 independent battalions. The guards brigades were the only units of the ZNG that were fully equipped with small arms; throughout the ZNG there was a lack of heavier weapons and there was poor command and control structure above the brigade level. The shortage of heavy weapons was so severe that the ZNG resorted to using World War II weapons taken from museums and film studios. At the time, the Croatian weapon stockpile consisted of 30,000 small arms purchased abroad and 15,000 previously owned by the police. To replace the personnel lost to the guards brigades, a new 10,000-strong special police was established.

== Prelude ==
Croatian Forces supplied Weapons, ammunition, and food to the soldiers fighting in Vukovar via roads near Vinkovci and Nuštar, this prompted Serbian forces to attack Nuštar as it was the main base for the rearming of the Croatian Soldiers at Vukovar. This prompted the Yugoslav People’s Army to launch a series of attacks in the area.

== Timeline ==
Prior to the ground assault, the Yugoslav People's Army (JNA) subjected Nuštar to intense artillery shelling, firing over 3,000 projectiles and deploying fuel-air explosives. Despite the severe bombardment, Croatian forces quickly reorganized and replenished their ammunition.

The primary armored offensive was launched just after 9:00 am, utilizing a combined force of tanks and infantry originating from Marinci and the Henrikovci Estate. Approximately 50 tanks and armored personnel carriers (APCs) provided a moving shield for an infantry force of 500 to 1,000 JNA troops and Serb paramilitaries. Upon entering the village, the advancing column quickly overwhelmed a Croatian National Guard (ZNG) cannon positioned at the entrance.

After passing the local cemetery, the JNA and paramilitary forces split to execute a two-pronged attack. One armored group advanced down the main street, while another moved along the side of the cemetery toward Ban Jelačić Street. This maneuver was designed to form a pincer movement with paramilitary units advancing from recently captured Cerić. Concurrently, a third detachment entered Marin Držić Street to reinforce the push into the village center.

The strategic objective of the JNA was to seize the village center and capture the local castle, which housed the Croatian field headquarters. Success would have completely severed the vital supply route connecting Vinkovci to the besieged garrison at the Battle of Vukovar.

However, the advance broke down due to determined resistance from ZNG and Croatian Defence Forces (HOS) defenders. The battle quickly degenerated into fierce, close-quarters street fighting, particularly along Marin Držić Street. Utilizing light infantry weapons, hand grenades, and shoulder-fired anti-tank rocket launchers, the defenders systematically repelled the armored thrusts. Although arriving reserve troops from the ZNG 109th Brigade suffered casualties from Serb snipers, the Croatian lines held, and the JNA offensive failed to secure its objectives.

== Aftermath ==
The City of Nuštar had been completely destroyed during the battle, with approximately +5,000 bombs and shells hitting the town, including the killing of Croatians by the White Eagles and the Serb Volunteer Guard

== Sources ==
- Central Intelligence Agency, Office of Russian and European Analysis (2002). Balkan Battlegrounds: A Military History of the Yugoslav Conflict, 1990–1995. Washington, D.C.: Central Intelligence Agency. ISBN 9780160664724. OCLC 50396958.
- Eastern Europe and the Commonwealth of Independent States. London, England: Routledge. 1999. ISBN 978-1-85743-058-5.
- Engelberg, Stephen (3 March 1991). "Belgrade Sends Troops to Croatia Town". The New York Times. Archived from the original on 2 October 2013.
- Hoare, Marko Attila (2010). "The War of Yugoslav Succession". In Ramet, Sabrina P. (ed.). Central and Southeast European Politics Since 1989. Cambridge University Press. ISBN 978-1-139-48750-4.
- Ramet, Sabrina P. (2006). The Three Yugoslavias: State-Building And Legitimation, 1918–2006. Bloomington, Indiana: Indiana University Press. ISBN 978-0-253-34656-8.
- Sudetic, Chuck (2 April 1991). "Rebel Serbs Complicate Rift on Yugoslav Unity". The New York Times. Archived from the original on 2 October 2013.
- "Roads Sealed as Yugoslav Unrest Mounts". The New York Times. Reuters. 19 August 1990. Archived from the original on 21 September 2013.
- "The Prosecutor vs. Milan Martic – Judgement" (PDF). International Criminal Tribunal for the former Yugoslavia. 12 June 2007.
