= Clashes in Bogdanovci =

1991 event the Croatian War of Independence

- Part of the Croatian War of Independence
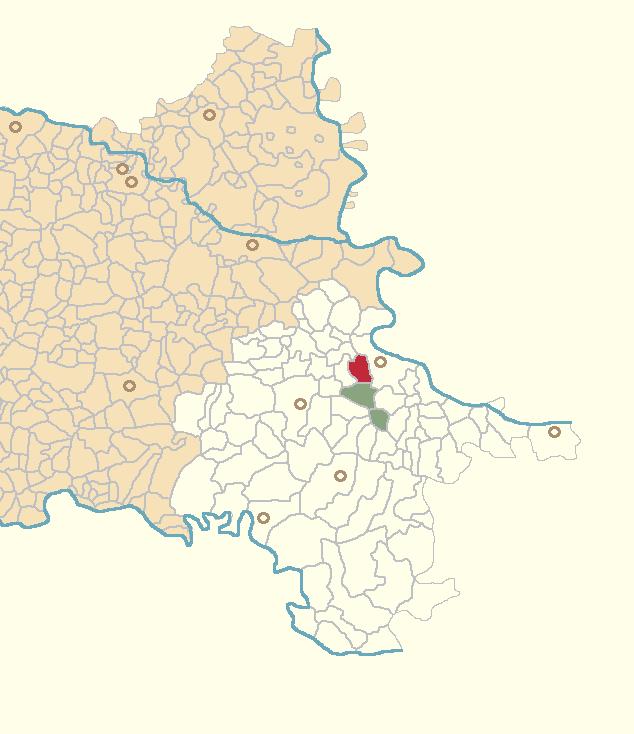
- The location of Bogdanovci within Croatia
Date	19 October – 10 November 1991
Location	Bogdanovci, Croatia
Result	Yugoslav-SAO Krajina victory

Belligerents
(Socialist Federal Republic of Yugoslavia) Yugoslavia; SAO Eastern Slavonia, Baranja and Western Syrmia	Croatia

Commanders and leaders
(Socialist Federal Republic of Yugoslavia) Željko Ražnatović	Unknown

Units involved
Yugoslav People's Army: Yugoslav Ground Forces; Serb Volunteer Guard	Croatian National Guard (until November 1991); Armed Forces of Croatia (from November 1991): Croatian Army

Casualties and losses
Unknown	70 soldiers killed
- 89 Croat civilians killed or missing

The Clashes in Bogdanovci occurred during the Croatian War of Independence on 18 November 1991. They were fought between Croatia, and SAO Krajina which was supported by the Yugoslav People's Army. The battle ended with a Serbian victory and the taking over of Bogdanovci.

== Prelude to the battle ==
The only connection with the outside world was the so-called "corn road." It was a field road hidden by corn that went through Bogdanovaci, Marinci, and Nuštar. With the fall of the Marinci at the end of October, that connection was cut off.

== Clashes ==
From 19 October 1991, the connection between Bogdanovaci and Vukovar was completely severed. The company of the 204th brigade of the National Guard Corps, which was located in the besieged Bogdanovci, then resisted the attacks of the Serbian army independently with the help of local patriots. Despite a month of brave defense, in which locals, members of the police, the National Guard Corps, and HOS participated, Bogdanovci—a town of 3,200 inhabitants as of 1991— fell on 10 November 1991, into the hands of the SAO Eastern Slavonia, Baranja and Western Syrmia units supported by Yugoslav People's Army.

Approximately 89 Croat civilians were killed or remain missing. Civilian deaths were caused by indiscriminate Serb shelling, against people trying to flee the village as well as in mass killings when Serb forces entered and occupied Bogdanovci. A number of Croat civilians were killed when Serb forces would throw hand grenades into basements where civilians had taken refuge, others were removed from their basements and homes and subsequently killed. Most civilian victims were ethnic Croats, but also included the killing of nine Albanian civilians.

In addition to the 89 victims from Bogdanovci, 70 Croat soldiers who came to aid in the defense were also killed. The number of casualties on the Serb side is unknown.
