= Veljko Ražnatović =

Montenegrin Colonel in the Yugoslav Air Force

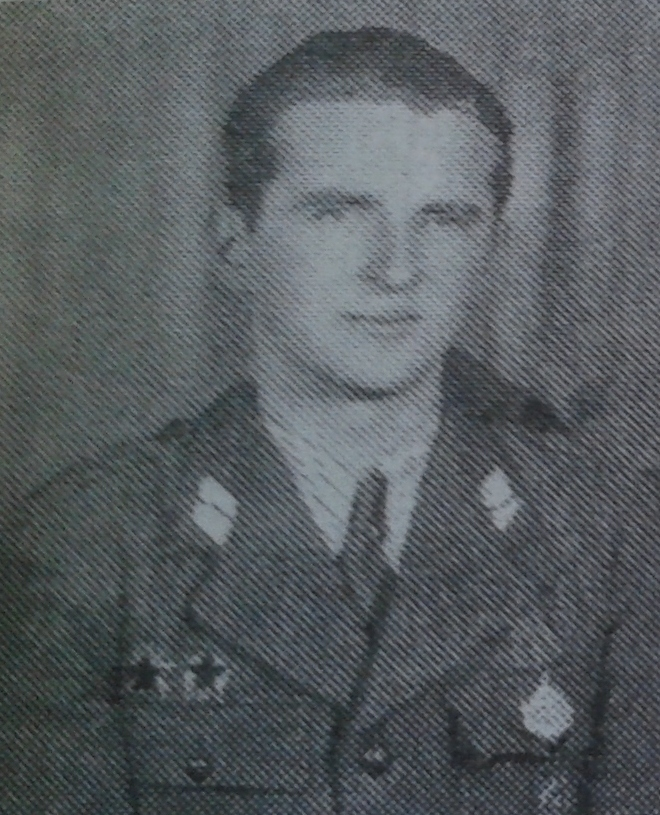
- Born: 20 May 1920; Rijeka Crnojevića, Kingdom of Serbs, Croats and Slovenes
- Died: 17 June 1986 (aged 66); Belgrade, SR Serbia, SFR Yugoslavia
- Military career
- Allegiance: SFR Yugoslavia
- Branch: Yugoslav Air Force
- Rank: Colonel
- Conflicts: World War II in Yugoslavia

Veljko Ražnatović (Serbian Cyrillic: Вељко Ражнатовић; May 20, 1920 – June 17, 1986) was a Montenegrin Serb Colonel in the Yugoslav Air Force.

He is perhaps most remembered as the father of the mobster Željko "Arkan" Ražnatović, a paramilitary commander and head of the Serb paramilitary force called the Serb Volunteer Guard during the Yugoslav Wars.

== Biography ==
He was born on May 20, 1920 in Rijeka Crnojevića, near Cetinje in present-day Montenegro.

As a young man, he joined the youth revolutionary movement and in 1939 he became a member of the League of Communist Youth of Yugoslavia. He became a member of the Communist Party of Yugoslavia in May 1941.

After the invasion and occupation of Yugoslavia, in 1941, he participated in the preparations for the armed uprising. He was a participant in the Uprising in Montenegro, and then worked as an illegal in Cetinje, where he was a member of the District Committee of the Communist Party of Yugoslavia for Cetinje.

He later transferred to the unit, where he performed the duties of deputy commander and company commander. He was then a member of the Politodel of the Tenth Krajina Strike Brigade, a member of the Politodel of the 23rd Serbian Division and the Deputy Political Commissar of the 46th Serbian Division.

In August 1945, he was appointed political commissar of the Air Force Military School and worked on the creation of new regiments and air bases. He was especially engaged in organizing the Command of the Aviation Military Academy, as well as the teaching department and teaching.

He later served in Brežice, Zagreb and Pančevo and was commissar of the 37th Aviation Division until 1953.

He was awarded the Commemorative Medal of the Partisans of 1941 and other Yugoslav decorations, including the Order of Brotherhood and Unity of the First Degree, the Order of the Partisan Star of the Second Degree, the Order of Merit for the People of the Second Degree, the Order of Bravery and the Order of the Partisan Star of the Third Degree.

== Personal life ==
He was married to Slavka (née Josifović; 1925–2012) with whom he had three daughters named Mirjana, Jasna and Biljana and a son, Željko. Ražnatović died on June 17, 1986 in Belgrade, aged 66.
