= Kenjo Janković =

Montenegrin warrior and military leader

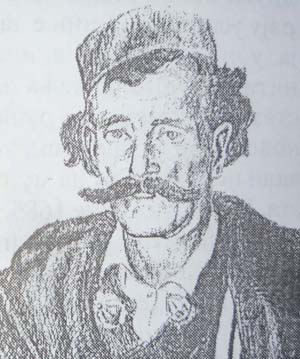
- Born: Krsto Janković; 1797; Rvaši, Ceklin, Montenegro
- Died: 12 May 1861 (aged 63–64); Strugari, Ceklin, Montenegro
- Military career
- Allegiance: Prince-Bishopric of Montenegro (1814–52); Principality of Montenegro (1852–61)
- Service years: 1814–61
- Nickname: Kenjo Stankov
- Conflicts: Invasion of Žabljak (1835); Invasion of Žabljak (1852)
- Awards: Obilić Medal

Kenjo Stankov Janković (Serbian cyrillic: Кењо Станков Јанковић; 1797 in Ceklin – 12 May 1861 in Ceklin) was a Serbian warrior and military leader. Janković is most notable for leading a small band of Montenegrin rebels which captured the Ottoman-occupied town of Žabljak Crnojevića on two occasions, in 1835 and 1852.

== Biography ==
Janković was born in 1797 in the village of Rvaši in Ceklin, to father Stanko and mother Bistra. He was a Montenegrin rebel and military leader of the Montenegrin Ceklin clan, which faced constant clashes with nearby Ottoman Sanjak of Scutari, first taking up arms at the age of 17, and continuing his guerilla activity until the end of his life. His most notable achievements were two successful invasions of the fortified town of Žabljak Crnojevića, which his company occupied in 1835 and 1852. For his achievements he was decorated with the Obilić medal, the highest military decoration in Montenegro at the time.

== Legacy ==
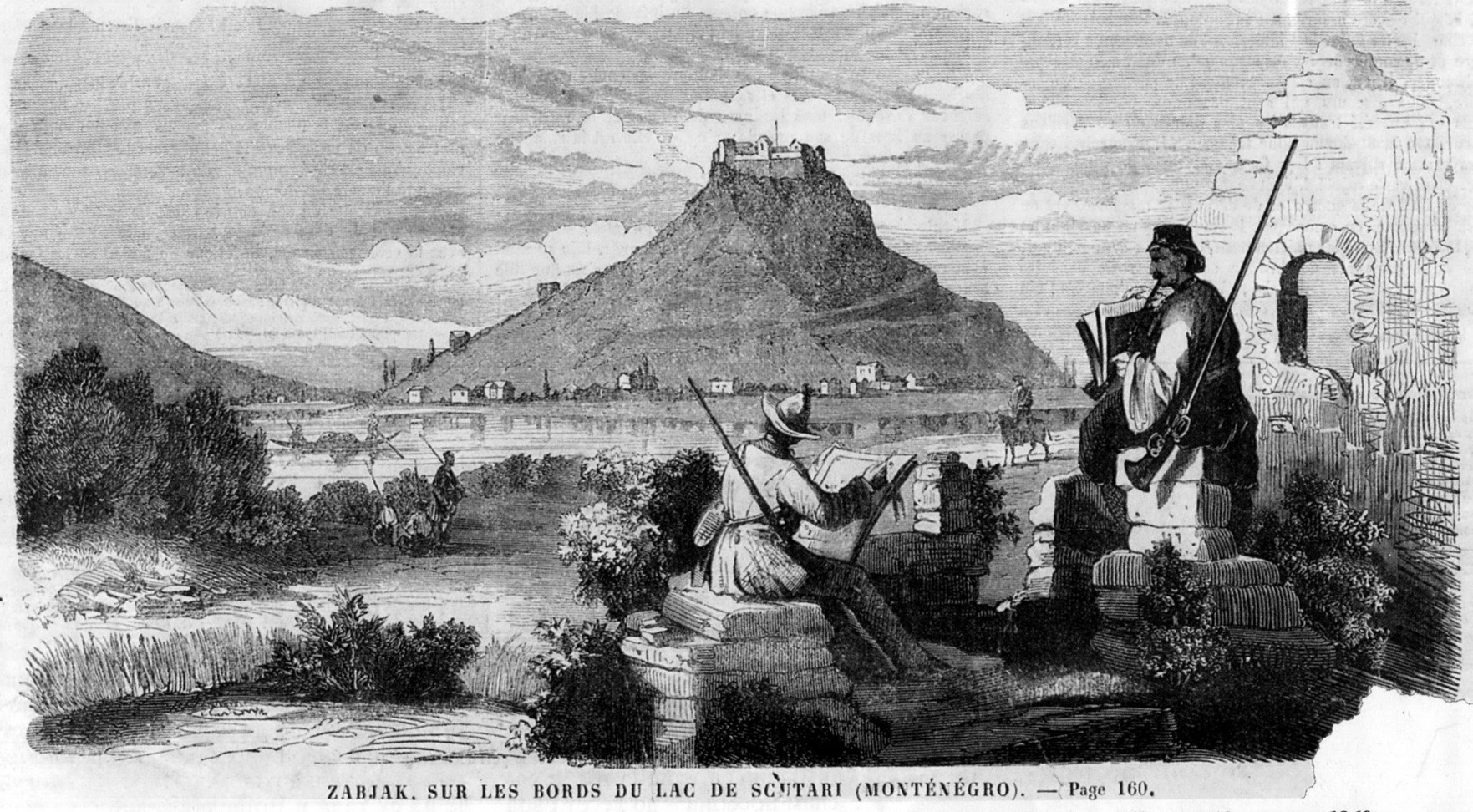
Žabljak, the fortified town Janković and his troops successfully captured in 1835 and 1852.

Janković was buried in his home village of Rvaši, where Prince Nikola I erected a monument to his memory in 1874. Monument to Janković and other rebels who liberated Žabljak Crnojevića on two occasions was erected in the town.
