= 96th Fighter-Bomber Aviation Regiment =

96th Fighter-Bomber Aviation Regiment: 96. lovačko-bombarderski avijacijski puk
- Active: 1944-1959
- Disbanded: 1959
- Country: Soviet Union; Yugoslavia
- Branch: Soviet Air Force; Yugoslav Air Force
- Type: Regiment
- Role: Assault; Fighter-Bomber
- Part of: 37th Aviation Division
- Engagements: Syrmian Front

The 96th Fighter-Bomber Aviation Regiment (Serbo-Croatian: 96. lovačko-bombarderski avijacijski puk / 96. ловачко-бомбардерски авијацијски пук) was established in 1944 as the 423rd Assault Aviation Regiment (Serbo-Croatian: 423. vazduhoplovni jurišni puk / 423. ваздухопловни јуришни пук), It was formed from Yugoslav partisan aviators and trained and equipped by the Soviet Air Force.

== History ==
=== 423rd Assault Aviation Regiment ===
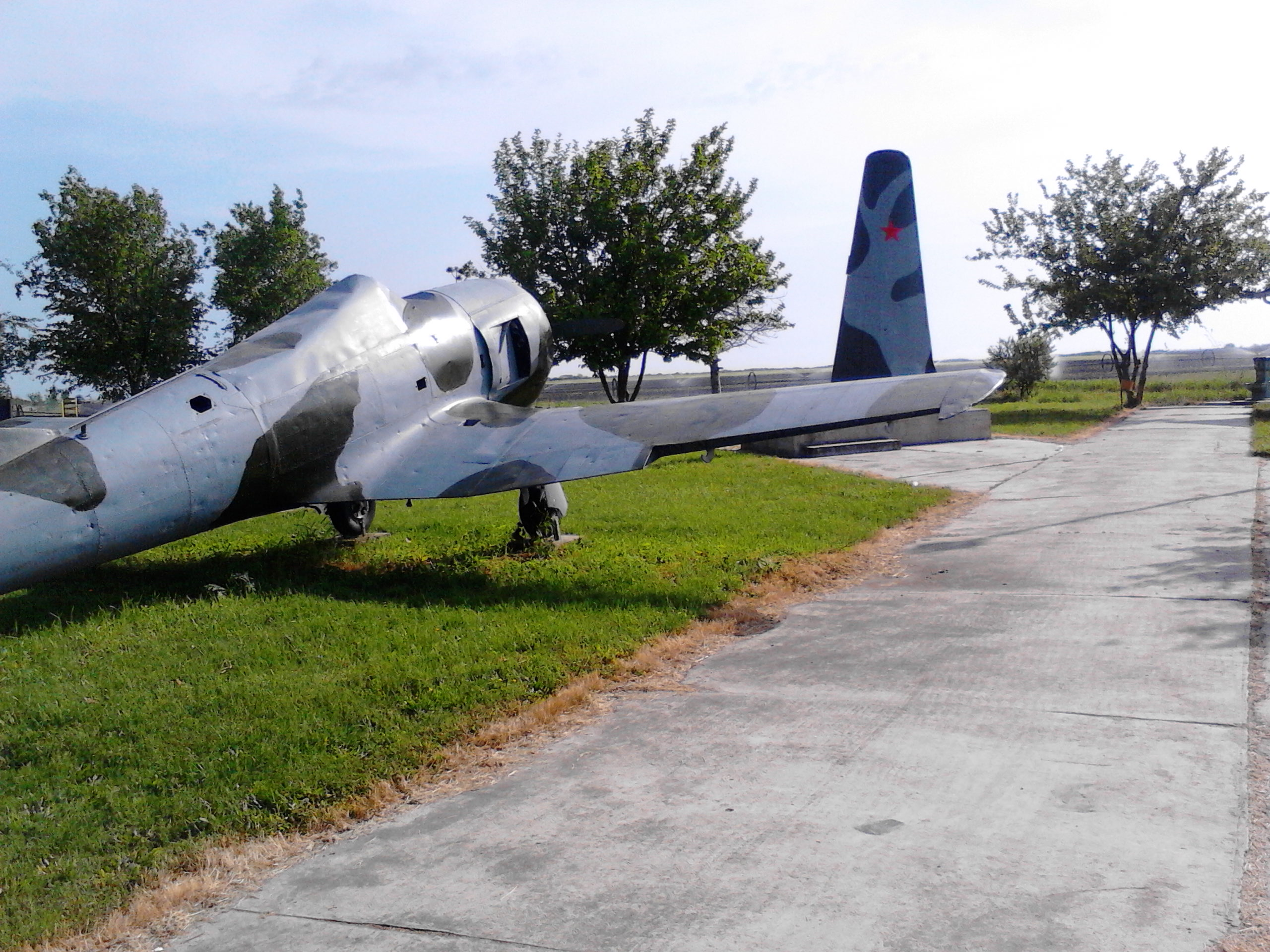
A Soko 522 converted into monument to 423rd Assault Aviation Regiment in village Gospođinci.

The unit was established on December 9 1944, in Ruma, from Yugoslav partisan aviators with the Soviet Air Force 17th Air Army's 167th Guards Assault Aviation Regiment (167.GShAP). It became independent from Soviet command and personnel in May 1945. The regiment was part of the 42nd Aviation Assault Division, and was equipped with Soviet Il-2 Shturmovik ground-attack aircraft. The regiment took part in final operations for the liberation of Yugoslavia. During combat operations it was based at Ruma, Gospođinci, Bački Brestovac, Ilinovac, Velika Gorica/Pleso and Ljubljana airfields.

After the war the regiment moved to Pleso.

By 1948 this regiment was renamed like all other units of the Yugoslav Army, becoming the 96th Assault Aviation Regiment.

=== 96th Assault and Fighter-Bomber Aviation Regiment ===
The 96th Assault Aviation Regiment was formed by renaming the 423rd Assault Aviation Regiment at Pleso airport as part of the 37th Aviation Division. By 1949 the regiment moved to Lučko near Zagreb, and in 1952 it was relocated to Cerklje, where it remained until it was disbanded. In 1954 the Il-2s were replaced by US-built F-47D Thunderbolt fighters. The regiment was renamed the 96th Fighter-Bomber Aviation Regiment (Serbo-Croatian: 96. lovačko-bombarderski avijacijski puk / 96. ловачко-бомбардерски авијацијски пук).

It was disbanded on October 22 1959.

== Assignments ==
- 42nd Aviation Assault Division (1945)
- 2nd Aviation Assault Division (1945–1948)
- 37th Aviation Division (1948–1959)

== Previous designations ==
- 423rd Assault Aviation Regiment (1944-1948)
- 96th Assault Aviation Regiment (1948-1954)
- 96th Fighter-Bomber Aviation Regiment (1954-1959)

== Bases stationed ==
- Ruma (1944)
- Gospođinci (1944)
- Bački Brestovac (1944)
- Ilinovac (1944)
- Velika Gorica/Pleso (Zagreb) (1944)
- Ljubljana (1945)
- Pleso (1945-1949)
- Lučko (1949-1951)
- Cerklje (1952-1959)

== Commanding officers ==
Date appointed	Name
	Milan Malnarić
	Milan Marjanović
	Blažo Kovačević
	Aleksandar Radičević
	Vlado Bakarić
	Ilija Zelenika
	Luka Popov
	Luka Stojanović-Muratov
	Drago Laušević
	Borivoje Tošić
	Milan Aćimović
	Nikola Vučević
	Teodor Majev
	Dragoljub Zvicer

== Aircraft ==
- Ilyushin Il-2 (1944–1954)
- P-47/F-47D Thunderbolt (1954–1959)
