= 37th Aviation Division =

37th Aviation Division: 37. vazduhoplovna divizija
- Active: 1944–1959
- Disbanded: 1959
- Country: Soviet Union; Yugoslavia
- Branch: Soviet Air Force; Yugoslav Air Force
- Type: Division
- Size: 3 regiments
- HQ: Cerklje
- Engagements: Syrmian Front

The 37th Aviation Division (Serbo-Croatian Latin: 37. vazduhoplovna divizija, 37. ваздухопловна дивизија) was a unit originally established in 1944 as the 42nd Aviation Assault Division (Serbo-Croatian Latin: 42. vazduhoplovna jurišna divizija, 42. ваздухопловна јуришна дивизија). It was formed from Yugoslav Partisan aviators, trained and equipped by the Soviet Air Force.

== History ==
=== 42nd Aviation Assault Division ===
The 42nd Aviation Assault Division was established during the December 1944, in Novi Sad, from Yugoslav Partisan aviators with the assistance of the Soviet Air Force 17th Air Army's 10th Guards Assault Aviation Division. It became independent of Soviet command and personnel in May 1945. The division was part of the Soviet Group of Aviation Divisions, and consisted of three fighter regiments. It took part in the final operations for the liberation of Yugoslavia. During combat operations, its headquarters was at Novi Sad.

The division had about 1100 personnel, 114 officers, 254 NCO's and 732 soldiers. Of that number, 253 were pilots and 653 were technicians. It was equipped with 125 Ilyushin Il-2 assault aircraft. In August 1945, the division was reorganized and renamed as the 2nd Aviation Mixed Division (Serbo-Croatian Latin: 2. vazduhoplovna mešovita divizija, 2. ваздухопловна мешовита дивизија).

The commander of the division in this period was Jevrem Bjelica, and the political commissar was Enver Ćemalović.

=== 2nd Aviation Division ===
The 2nd Aviation Mixed Division was formed on August 3, 1945, from the 42nd Aviation Assault Division with its headquarters in Zagreb. The division was directly under the Command of the Yugoslav Air Force. In 1947, the division was renamed the 2nd Aviation Assault Division (Serbo-Croatian Latin: 2. vazduhoplovna jurišna divizija, 2. ваздухопловна јуришна дивизија).

In 1948, the division was again renamed, becoming the 37th Assault Aviation Division (Serbo-Croatian Latin: 37. vazduhoplovna jurišna divizija, 37. ваздухопловна јуришна дивизија).

The commanders of the division in this period were Jevrem Bjelica and Viktor Bubanj. The political commissars were Enver Ćemalović and Stane Bobnar.

=== 37th Aviation Division ===
The 37th Aviation Assault Division was formed by renaming the 2nd Aviation Assault Division in 1948. It underwent some minor organisational changes at this time.

In 1949, the division was attached to the 3rd Aviation Corps. It relocated its headquarters from Zagreb to Cerklje. In 1954, it was renamed as the Aviation Fighter-Bomber Division due to the replacement of Soviet aircraft with US-made fighter-bombers.

It was disbanded on June 27, 1959, under the "Drvar" reorganization plan. Its command was transformed into the headquarters of the 7th Air Command and its units were attached to the 5th Air Command.

The commanders of the division in this period were Viktor Bubanj, Vladimir Bakarić, Zlatko Predavec, Milan Simović and Svetozar Radojević. Its commissars were Enver Ćemalović and Veljko Ražnatović until 1953.

== Assignments ==
- Group of aviation divisions (1944-1945)
- Command of Yugoslav Air Force (1945-1949)
- 3rd Aviation Corps (1949–1959)

== Previous designations ==
- 42nd Aviation Assault Division (1944-1945)
- 2nd Aviation Mixed Division (1945-1947)
- 2nd Aviation Assault Division (1947-1948)
- 37th Aviation Assault Division (1948-1954)
- 37th Aviation Fighter-Bomber Division (1954-1959)

== Organization ==
=== 1944-1945 ===
- 42nd Aviation Assault Division
  - 421st Assault Aviation Regiment
  - 422nd Assault Aviation Regiment
  - 423rd Assault Aviation Regiment

=== 1945 ===
- 42nd Aviation Assault Division
  - 422nd Assault Aviation Regiment
  - 423rd Assault Aviation Regiment
  - 112th Fighter Aviation Regiment

=== 1945-1947 ===
- 2nd Aviation Mixed Division
  - 113th Fighter Aviation Regiment
  - 421st Assault Aviation Regiment
  - 422nd Assault Aviation Regiment
  - 423rd Assault Aviation Regiment

=== 1947-1948 ===
- 2nd Aviation Assault Division
  - 421st Assault Aviation Regiment
  - 422nd Assault Aviation Regiment
  - 423rd Assault Aviation Regiment

=== 1948-1959 ===
- 37th Aviation Assault/Fighter-Bomber Division
    - Training Squadron of 37th Aviation Division (1953-1959)
    - 715th Independent Reconnaissance Squadron (1949-1952)
  - 96th Assault Aviation Regiment
  - 111th Assault Aviation Regiment
  - 138th Assault Aviation Regiment (1949–1958)
  - 474th Air Base

== Headquarters ==
- Novi Sad (1944-1945)
- Zagreb (1945-1951)
- Cerklje (1951-1959)

== Commanding officers ==
- Colonel Jevrem Bjelica
- Colonel Viktor Bubanj
- Colonel Vladimir Bakarić
- Major Zlatko Predavec (defected with Po-2 aircraft to Austria in 1950.)
- Colonel Milan Simović
- Colonel Svetozar Radojević

=== Political commissars ===
- Lieutenant-Colonel Enver Ćemalović
- Colonel Stane Bobnar
- Colonel Enver Ćemalović
- Colonel Veljko Ražnatović
