= 715th Independent Reconnaissance Squadron =

715th Independent Reconnaissance Squadron: 715. samostalna izviđačka avijacijska eskadrila
- Active: December, 1949 – February, 1952
- Disbanded: February, 1952
- Country: Yugoslavia
- Branch: Yugoslav Air Force
- Type: Squadron
- Role: Reconnaissance
- Part of: 37th Aviation Division
- Garrison/HQ: Pleso

The 715th Independent Reconnaissance Squadron (Serbo-Croatian: 715. samostalna izviđačka eskadrila / 715. самостална извиђачка ескадрила) was an aviation squadron of Yugoslav Air Force formed in December, 1949 by order from July 24, same year at Pleso airfield.

Squadron was part of 37th Aviation Division. By war timetable it supposed to be part of 103rd Reconnaissance Aviation Regiment. It was equipped with Soviet-made Petlyakov Pe-2 bomber aircraft.

By February, 1952 squadron was disbanded and with 184th Light Night Bomber Aviation Regiment it has formed 184th Reconnaissance Aviation Regiment.

== Equipment ==
- Petlyakov Pe-2
