= Žabljak Crnojevića =

- Жабљак Црнојевића
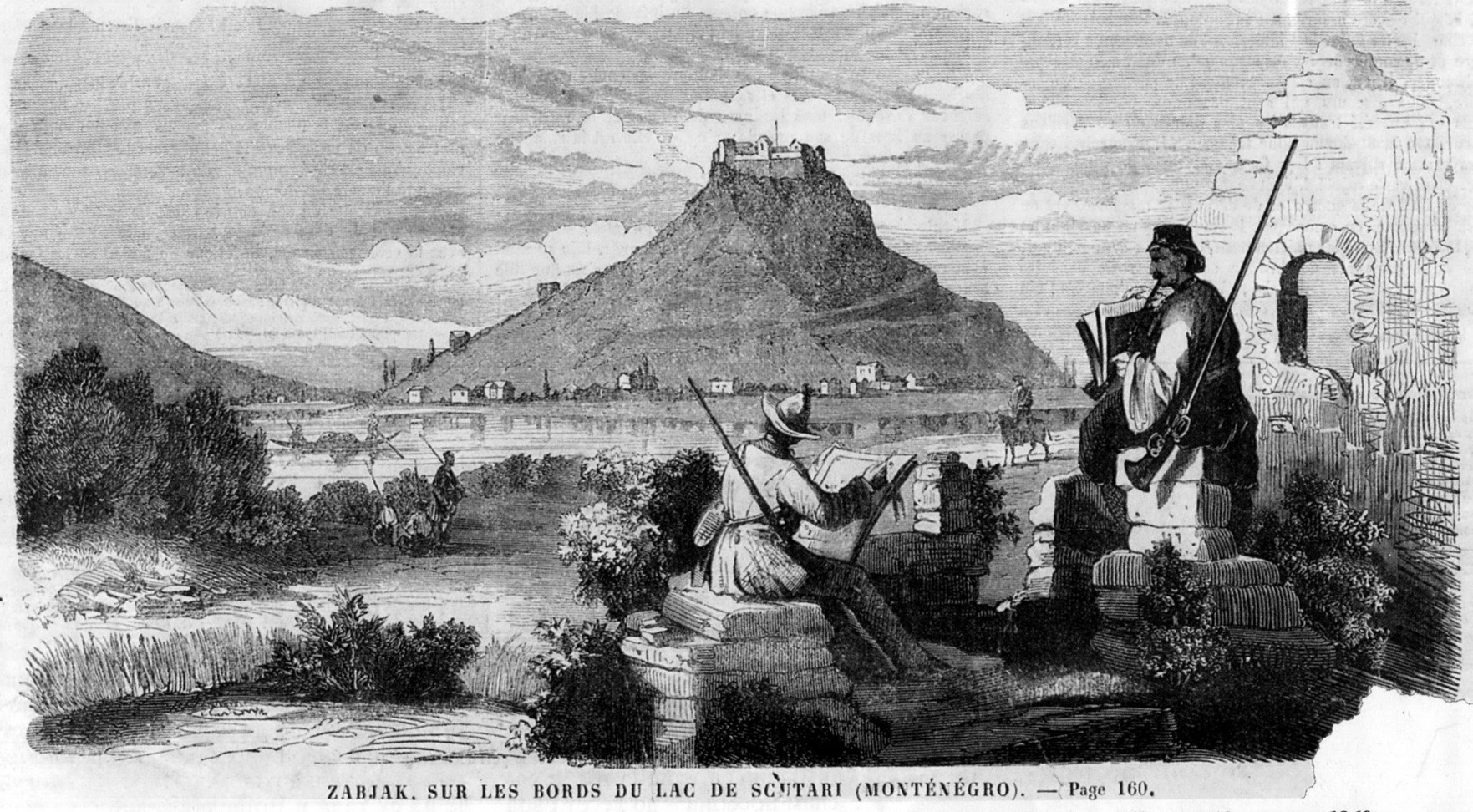
- Žabljak Crnojevića in 1860.

Location
- Location within Montenegro
- Coordinates: 42.317°N 19.158°E

Site history
- Built: 15th century
- Battles/wars: Siege of Shkodra (1474); Siege of Shkodra; Invasion of Žabljak (1835); Invasion of Žabljak (1852)

Žabljak Crnojevića (Montenegrin Cyrillic: Жабљак Црнојевића, pronounced [ʒâbʎaːk t͡sr̂nɔjɛv̞it͡ɕaː]), commonly referred to as Žabljak, is an abandoned medieval fortified town (fortress) in Montenegro. The fortress is located on the confluence of the Morača river in lake Skadar.

== History ==
It is believed that this fortress was founded in the 10th century during the reign of the Vojislavljević dynasty in then-known Dioclea, whereas the first known written testimony of the fortress originate from mid-14th century. The fortress served as the capital of Zeta under the Crnojević dynasty from 1466 till 1478, being the seat of Stefan and Ivan Crnojević. However, Ivan Crnojević was forced to move the capital in 1478 when the Ottomans seized the town during the siege of Shkodra, holding it until the decision of the Berlin Congress in 1878 when it fell under Montenegrin administration once again after 400 years of Turkish rule. The town has tall walls with towers, as well as one gate. Within the walls can be found: Ivan Crnojević's court, Church of Saint George (was turned into a mosque during Ottoman rule), housing and military facilities, a warehouse for clothes and a water tank, most of which are preserved.

In the past Žabljak was home to a significant Albanian community. They were largely expelled in different waves during the late 19th century expulsion of the Albanians fleeing to Turkey, Kosovo (Pristina) and Macedonia.

== Demographics ==
Ethnicity in 2011
Ethnicity	Number	Percentage
Montenegrins	17	65.4%
Serbs	9	34.6%
Total	26	100%

== Gallery ==
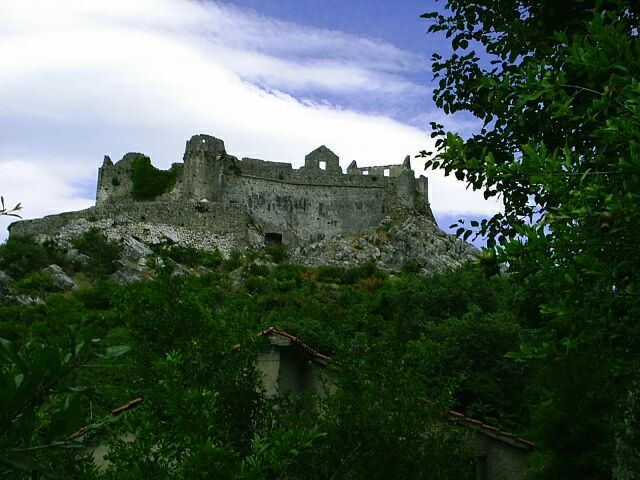
View of the castle from the village

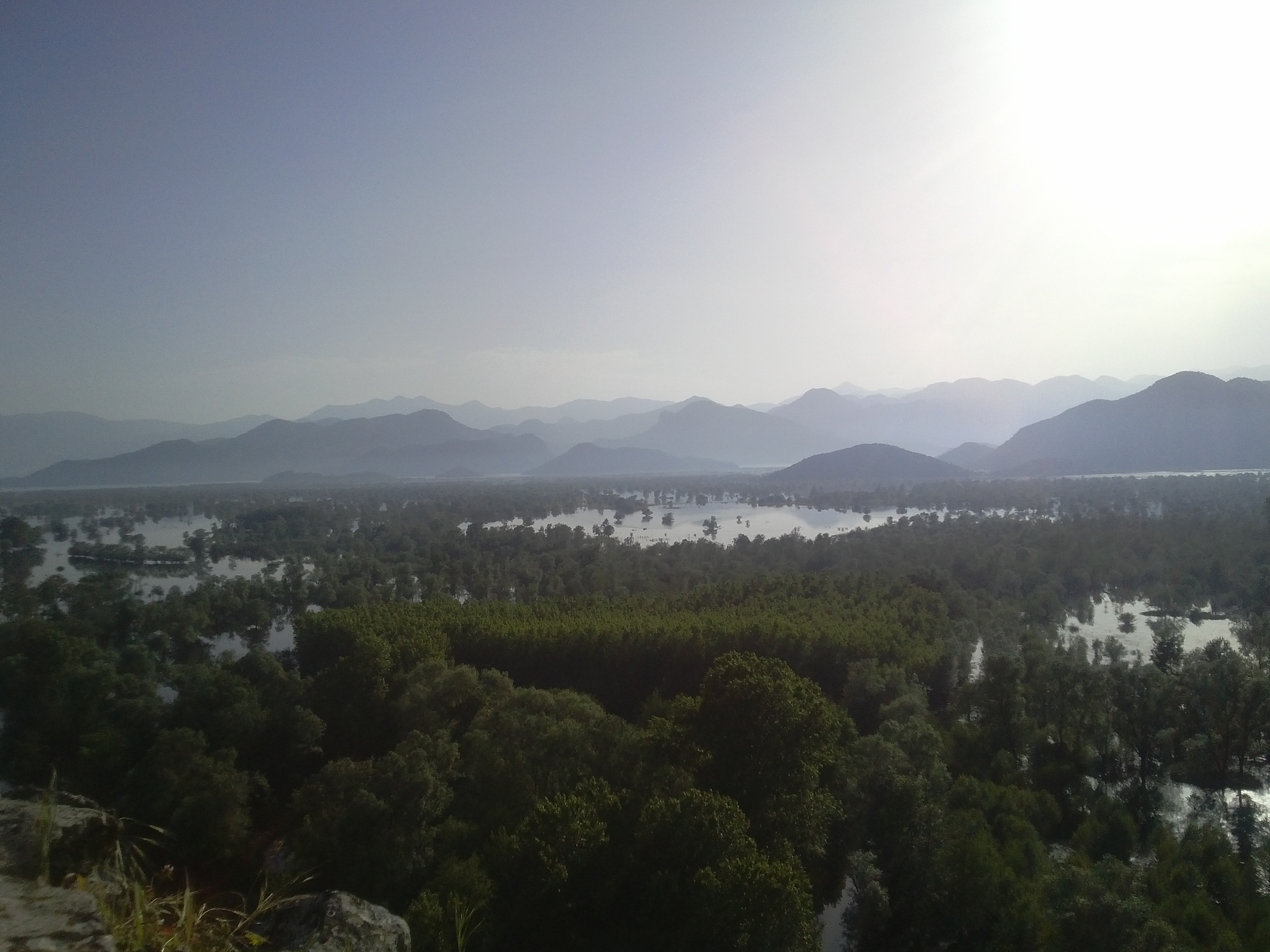
View from the castle to the Skadar lake

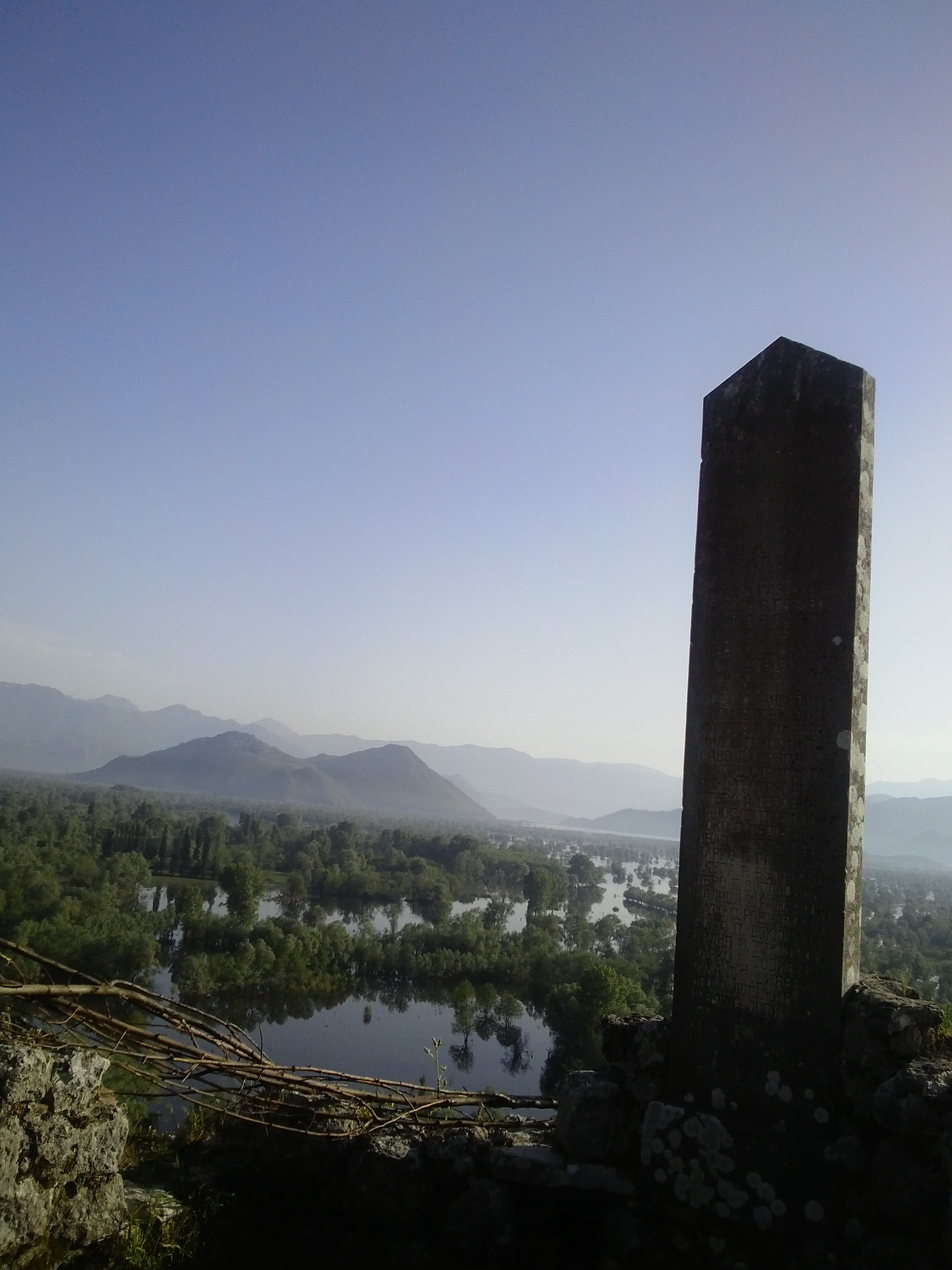
Monument to Kenjo Janković and Ceklin rebels

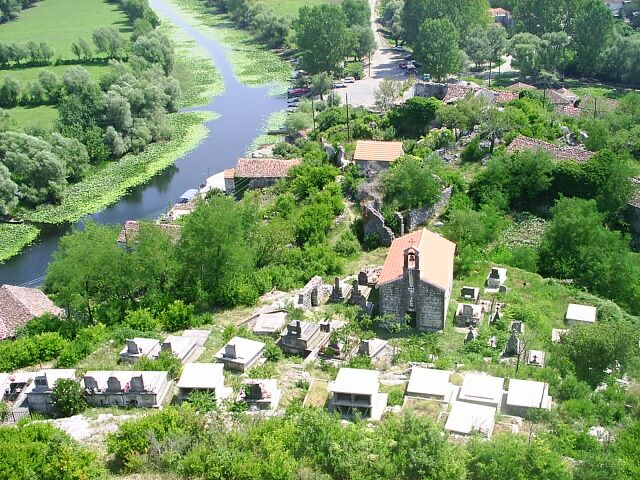
The village church and graveyard under the castle
