= Šehovci =

- Village
- Location within Bosnia and Herzegovina
- Coordinates: 44.778099°N 16.667724°E
- Country: Bosnia and Herzegovina
- Entity: Federation of Bosnia and Herzegovina
- Canton: Una-Sana
- Municipality: Sanski Most

Area
  - Total: 1.22 sq mi (3.17 km^{2})

Population (2013)
  - Total: 251
  - Density: 205/sq mi (79.2/km^{2})
- Time zone: UTC+1 (CET)
  - Summer (DST): UTC+2 (CEST)

Šehovci is a village in the municipality of Sanski Most, Federation of Bosnia and Herzegovina, Bosnia and Herzegovina.

== Demographics ==
According to the 2013 census, its population was 251.

Ethnicity in 2013
Ethnicity	Number	Percentage
Serbs	251	100%
