= Klaus Schlichte =

German political scientist

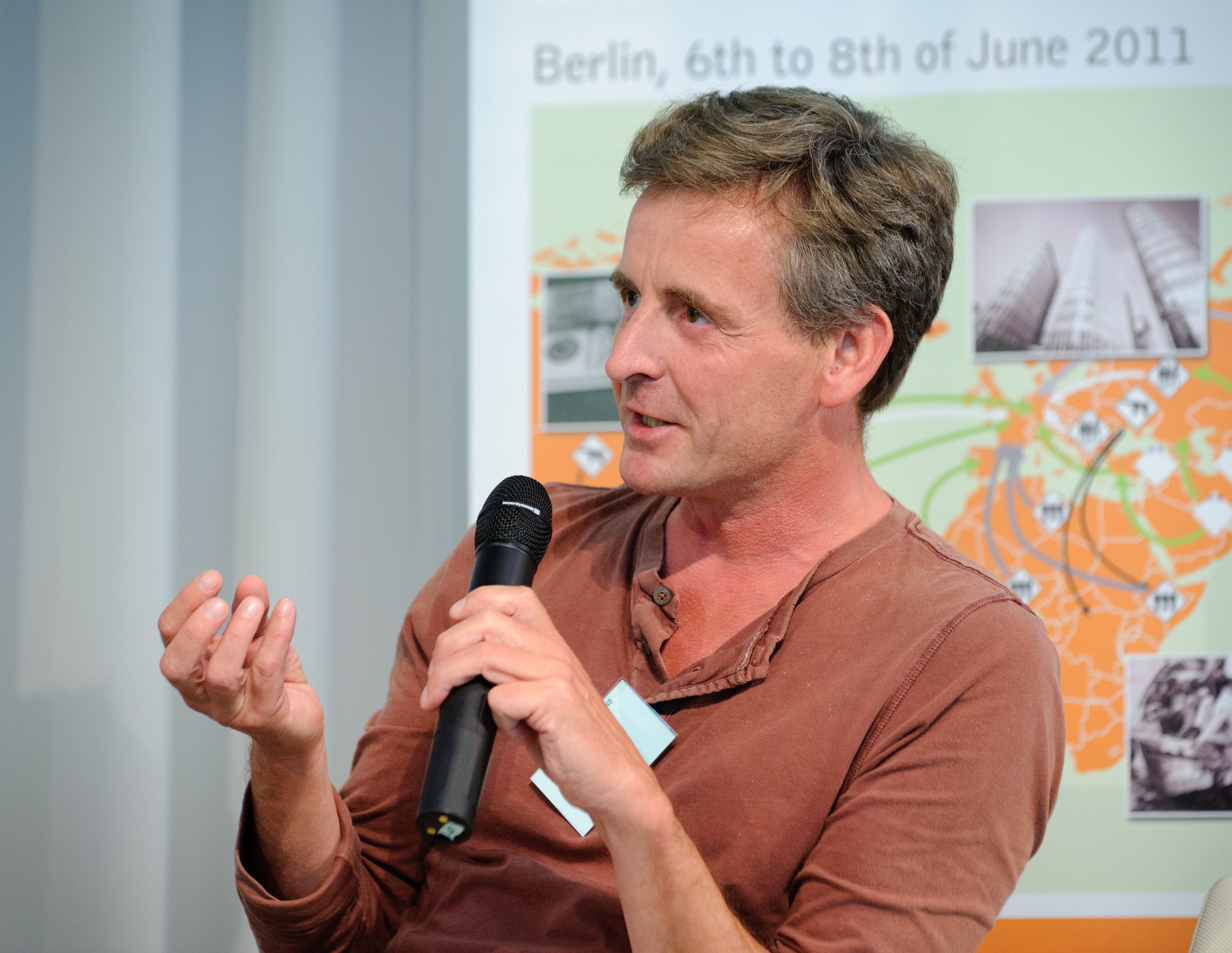
- Klaus Schlichte, 2011
- Education: University of Hamburg
- Scientific career
- Fields: Political science
- Workplaces: University of Bremen

Klaus Schlichte is a German political scientist. He is a professor of international relations at the University of Bremen.

== Education ==
Schlichte earned his PhD from the University of Hamburg in 1995. He then earned his habilitation from the Goethe University Frankfurt in 2006.

== Career ==
From 2001 to 2007 Schlichte worked as a researcher at the Humboldt University of Berlin. From 2007 to 2010, he was a professor of international relations at the Otto von Guericke University Magdeburg. Since 2010 he has been a professor of international relations at the University of Bremen. His research is on German security policy, social dynamics in African societies, and war.
