= Serb Volunteer Guard =

Serbian volunteer paramilitary force during the Yugoslav Wars

- Српска добровољачка гарда - Srpska Dobrovoljačka Garda
- Insignia of the Serb Volunteer Guard
- Founded: 11 October 1990
- Disbanded: 20 April 1996
- Allegiance: SFR Yugoslavia; FR Yugoslavia; Serbian Krajina; Republika Srpska
- Branch: State Security Directorate
- Type: Paramilitary; Mechanized; Armoured
- Size: 4,000–5,000
- Garrison/HQ: Erdut
- Nicknames: Arkan's Tigers; Arkan's men
- Mottos: Где је један, ту су сви, Арканови тигрови! (Where one is, we are all – Arkan's Tigers!" )
- Colours: Red; Blue; White
- March: Arkanove Delije
- Mascot: Tiger
- Equipment: BOV VP, M53/59 Praga, TAM 150 T11, BVP M-80, OT M-60, BTR-60, T-55, T-62, M-84
- Engagements: Croatian War; 1991 Yugoslav campaign in Croatia; Battle of Jasenovac; Battles for Bogdanovac; Battle of Ernestinovo; Battle of Vukovar; Siege of Slunj; Siege of Osijek; Siege of Dubrovnik; Bosnian War; 1992 Yugoslav campaign in Bosnia; Capture of Bijeljina; Capture of Zvornik; Siege of Goražde; Siege of Žepa; Siege of Srebrenica; Operation Corridor 92; Operation Spider; Operation Sword–1; Operation Una; Operation Sana; Operation Prijedor 95

Commanders
- 1st Commander: Željko Ražnatović
- 2nd Commander: Borislav Pelević
- 3rd Commander: Milorad Ulemek
- 4th Commander: Zvezdan Jovanović

Insignia
- Colours

The Serb Volunteer Guard (Note: Serbian: Српска добровољачка гарда, Srpska dobrovoljačka garda, SDG. Also known as Arkan's Tigers (Serbian: Арканови тигрови, romanized: Arkanovi Tigrovi) or Arkan's men (Serbian: Аркановци, romanized: Arkanovci).) was an elite Serbian volunteer paramilitary unit founded and led by Željko Ražnatović (better known as "Arkan"). It was recognized for its superior bearing and discipline, fighting in the Croatian War and the Bosnian War during the Yugoslav Wars. Considered one of the most feared and effective paramilitary forces during the conflicts, the unit was also responsible for numerous war crimes and massacres. The group operated with backing from elements of the Serbian State Security Directorate and was disbanded in April 1996. Arkan was later indicted for war crimes but was assassinated before he could stand trial.

== History and organization ==
Promotional poster of the Serb Volunteer Guard

The SDG was created on 11 October 1990 by twenty members of the Red Star Belgrade football club Ultra group Delije Sever. The rowdy football hooligans of the Delije ("Heroes") club-who were devoted to the Red Star Belgrade football team-were seen as a serious social problem by the late 1980s, and the gangster Ražnatović had taken over the Delije club at the request of the Ministry of the Interior as a way to control the hooligans. Ražnatović was already a living legend in the Belgrade underworld on the account of his criminal exploits both in Yugoslavia and in Western Europe, and he rapidly became a hero to the Delije club by his ability to arrange for them to go to Western Europe whenever Red Star Belgrade played a game in a Western European city with Ražnatović paying for their transport and motel costs. In Communist Yugoslavia, organised crime had an institutionalised role in the economy to provide goods and services that were otherwise difficult to obtain. This was especially the case as the policy of "market socialism" that was introduced in 1964 led to a hybrid economy with a capitalist economy co-existing with a communist economy. The policy of "market socialism" led to the emergence of a "grey economy" as many businesses sought to circumvent the rules as the law that forbade businesses from having more that five employees at any time, which to the corruption being institutionalised as the boundaries between what was legal and what was illegal were frequently blurred. Another factor that contributed to institutionalised corruption was the so-called "Balkan Express" as Yugoslavia was a key cross-over point in the heroin smuggling business. Heroin was grown in the so-called "Golden Crescent" of Afghanistan, Pakistan and Iran and smuggled into Western Europe via Turkey and the Balkans. By the 1970s-1980s, the Serbian mafia was making about $7 billion US per annum from smuggling heroin into Western Europe, which made the Serbian mafia into one of the most powerful organised crime groups in Europe, whose activities were tolerated by the Yugoslav authorities in exchange for a cut of the profits. For all these reasons, organised crime came to play an institutionalised role in Communist Yugoslavia analogous to the role played by the Mafia in Sicily, and it was quite common for state officials to have close ties with gangsters.

The group was under the command of the Territorial Defense, a regular military in charge of the territories of Croatia populated predominantly by Serbs during the first half of the 1990s. According to historian Tony Judt, the group was one of several irregular units which "were little more than organized bands of thugs and criminals, armed by Belgrade." The majority of those who joined the SDG were men under the age of 25 with a disproportionate number being football hooligan fans of the Red Star Belgrade football team. The 1980s and the early 1990s were a period of economic crisis and decline in Yugoslavia and those who joined the SDG were what was known in Yugoslavia as "deca kriza" ("crisis kids"), namely the generation of young people who came of age in the 1980s and early 1990s who were unable to find proper employment. Most of the "deca kriza" who joined the SDH were young men who were unable to find a job and hence self-respect, leading them to turn to the football hooligan subculture as a way to maintain a positive self-image. Most of the volunteers for the SDG came from Novi Beograd, a working class suburb of Belgrade hard hit by the double punch of rising unemployment and rising inflation. The majority of those who joined the SDG did so in 1991 and 1992 with a sharp drop in the number of volunteers in 1993 as the unglamorous reality of war set in.

Though commonly described as a Serbian ultra-nationalist group, the SDG seemed to have been more interested in plundering, rape, and murder with nationalism serving as a convenient justification for their crimes. In this, the SDG differed significantly from the Serbian Chetnik Movement and the White Eagles associated with Vojislav Šešelj and the Serbian Guard led by Vuk Drašković, both of which seemed to be more sincere in their nationalism. The gangster Ražnatović had functioned since the 1970s as a sort of state-sanctioned criminal whose criminal activities were tolerated by the Yugoslav state in exchange for him performing services as assassinations that the Yugoslav state did not wish to be seen doing itself. The SDG was the best equipped of the various para-military militias founded in the early 1990s, being supplied by the Yugoslav People's Army with guns, ammunition, lorries, light artillery, and shells. The German political scientist Klaus Schlichte wrote that Ražnatović in founding and leading the SDG was almost certainly continuing his traditional role as a state-sanctioned criminal who was performing tasks on behalf of the state that the state did not wish to be seen doing itself. Ražnatović openly recruited for his militia with no interference from the authorities and obtained weapons from the Yugoslav Army, which suggested that his activities were sanctioned at the highest level in Belgrade. A former secretary for Ražnatović known only as B129 due to a court order testified at the International Criminal Tribunal for the former Yugoslavia in 2003 that the SDG was under the operational order of the state security officials and that Ražnatović was in no way independent.

Unlike the para-military groups led by Šešelj and Drašković, the Serbian authorities clearly favored the SDG in terms of weapons and other support, which was due to the fact that Ražnatović was a gangster and football hooligan who in the early 1990s had no apparent political ambitions, unlike the politicians Šešelj and Drašković. Drašković in particular was opposed to the Serb leader Slobodan Milošević, whom he had run against in the 1990 election, and his Serbian Guard militia was not favored by the state with weapons at all. Šešelj was more willing to work with Milošević, but as the name of his group, the Chetniks, suggests he saw himself and his followers as a continuation of the Chetniks of World War Two, which was a source of distrust with Milošević who was the leader of the Serbian Socialist Party (the renamed League of Serb Communists who could trace their descent back to the Partisans of World War Two). Šešelj had founded his Chetnik militia as a way to contribute to his popularity, which was so successful that in 1993 Milošević cut him from the supply of arms and blamed him for the ethnic cleansing in the Bosnian War.

The SDG set up their headquarters and training camp in a former military facility in Erdut. It saw action from mid-1991 to late 1995, initially in the Vukovar region of Croatia. It was supplied and equipped from the reserves of the Serbian police force during the Yugoslav Wars in Bosnia and Croatia.

After the war broke out in the former Yugoslav Republic of Croatia in the autumn of 1991 and in the Republic of Bosnia and Herzegovina in April 1992, Arkan and his units moved to attack different territories in these countries. In Croatia, Arkan's Tigers fought in various locales in Eastern Slavonia.

Paramilitary units are responsible for some of the most brutal aspects of ethnic cleansing. Two of the units that have played a major role in the ethnic cleansing campaign in BiH, the Chetniks associated with Vojislav Šešelj and the Tigers associated with Željko Ražnatović (Arkan), have been active in the Republic of Serbia as well...Arkan's Tigers have staged military training exercises allegedly designed to intimidate Albanian residents in Kosovo.

— Report of United Nations Commission on ethnic cleansing in Bosnia

Such was the ferocity of Serbian ethnic cleansing in the first months of the Bosnian war that some 70% of the 2.2 million displaced during the war were expelled between April–August 1992 with the remaining 30% being expelled between September 1992-October 1995. The standard practice of the SDG was to take a town or village; search thoroughly for any people; massacre the men; and take the women and children to a concentration camp. The women taken to the camps were invariably gang-raped. Between April–August 1992, some 850 Bosnian Muslim or Bosnian Croat villages were destroyed in this manner. The British journalist Timothy Donais wrote about the "Tiger" militia that: “Payment often came in the form of being allowed to be the first to loot, while many paramilitary leaders, Arkan being among the most prominent, took advantage of wartime conditions to engage heavily in smuggling and other black-market activities, often cooperating across confrontation lines." Owing to the way that inflation had destroyed the value of the Yugoslav dinar in the 1980s, the SDG was primarily paid in the form of looted jewelry, gold, and automobiles while selling other looted goods on the black market of Belgrade.

The SDG, under the command of Arkan, massacred hundreds of people in eastern Croatia and Bosnia and Herzegovina while in the early ethnic cleansing campaigns in eastern Bosnia this unit had a major role. The massacres were not incidental to the campaigns waged by the SDG, but were rather the group's primary purpose as the Serb war aims were the creation of an "ethically cleansed" greater Serbia that would incorporate much of Croatia and Bosnia-Herzegovina sans the Croat and Bosnian Muslim populations. The SDG functioned as much of a criminal organisation as a para-military one with Arkan and the other "Tigers" being deeply involved in smuggling petrol into Serbia from Bulgaria and Romania in defiance of the United Nations sanctions imposed on Serbia in May 1992. Arkan's smuggling activities led to his downfall as he came into conflict with Marko Milošević, the son of the Serb leader Slobodan Milošević, who was widely believed to be also engaged in the business of smuggling petrol. Starting in the summer of 1995, the Serbian state sharply curtailed the supply of the arms to the SDG, which was widely interpreted as a punishment for selling contraband petrol at a lower price than sold by the ring said to be controlled by Marko Milošević. In autumn 1995, Arkan's troops fought in the area of Banja Luka, Sanski Most, and Prijedor where they were routed. Arkan personally led most war actions, and rewarded his most efficient officers and soldiers with ranks, medals and eventually the products of lootings.

The SDG was officially disbanded in April 1996, and all of its members were ordered to join the Yugoslav Army. Besides Arkan, a notable member of the SDG was his right-hand man, Colonel Nebojša Djordjević, who was murdered in late 1996. Another notable member was Milorad Ulemek, who is now serving a 40-year sentence for his involvement in the assassination of Serbia's pro-Western prime minister Zoran Đinđić in 2003.

== War crimes charges ==
Željko Ražnatović was indicted in 1997 by the International Criminal Tribunal for the former Yugoslavia for his command of the Guard, as the unit was allegedly responsible for numerous crimes against humanity, grave breaches of the Geneva Convention and violations of the laws or customs of war, including active participation in the ethnic cleansing in Bijeljina and Zvornik in 1992.

The International Criminal Tribunal for the former Yugoslavia charged the SDG, under the command or supervision of Željko Ražnatović with the following:

- Forcibly detaining approximately thirty non-Serb men and one woman, without food or water, in an inadequately ventilated boiler room of approximately five square metres (54 sq ft) in size.
- Transporting twelve non-Serb men from Sanski Most to an isolated location in the village of Trnova, where they shot and killed eleven of the men and critically wounded the twelfth.
- Transporting approximately sixty-seven non-Serb men and one woman from Sanski Most, Šehovci, and Pobrijeze to an isolated location in the village of Sasina and shooting them, killing sixty-five of the captives and wounding two survivors.
- Forcibly detaining approximately thirty-five Muslim Bosnian men in an inadequately ventilated boiler room around five square metres (54 sq ft), beating them while also depriving them of food and water, resulting in the deaths of two men.
- The rape of a Muslim Bosnian woman on a bus outside the Hotel Sanus in Sanski Most.

== Prominent members ==
- Željko Ražnatović – SDG Commander
- Borislav Pelević – Serbian presidential candidate in 2002 and 2004
- Milorad Ulemek – JSO Commander
- Zvezdan Jovanović – JSO Commander
- Mihajlo Ulemek – SDG Colonel and media personality
- Srđan Golubović - Trance DJ (not to be mistaken with a film director of the same name)

Many of the former members of "Arkan Tigers" are prominent figures in Serbia, maintaining close ties between each other and with Russian nationalist organisations. Jugoslav Simić and Svetozar Pejović posed with Russian Night Wolves, Ceca (Arkan's widow) performed for Vladimir Putin during his visit in Serbia, Srđan Golubović is a popular trance performer known as "DJ Max" and was identified by Rolling Stone as the SDG soldier kicking dead bodies of a Bosniak family in Bijeljina on a photo from 1992.

== In popular culture ==
- In the 2001 film Behind Enemy Lines (loosely based on the story of pilot Scott O'Grady during the Bosnian War), the unit appears as the main antagonists, led by the fictional Miroslav Lokar.
- In the fourteenth episode of the first season of the crime procedural Law & Order: Criminal Intent, "Homo Homini Lupis", the suspect of the investigation is accused of raping a young girl. In the course of the detectives' interrogation, they identify the suspect as a former member of the volunteer guard due to a tiger tattoo on his back and attempt to establish a pattern of behavior by pointing to the war crimes that occurred in Bosnia.
- In the 2008 Serbian film The Tour, a group of Serbian actors go on a tour in war-torn Bosnia. Among other factions, they meet an unnamed paramilitary unit wearing insignia similar to those of the Serb Volunteer Guard. The unit's commander (played by Sergej Trifunović) is clearly based on Arkan.
- In the 2012 Japanese anime Jormungand, one of the antagonists is Dragan Nikolaevich, commander of the Balkan Dragons. His looks and even his biography bear resounding resemblance to those of Arkan.
- The 2012 film Twice Born is based on a novel by Margaret Mazzantini set in the background of Bosnian War.

== See also ==
- Serbia in the Yugoslav Wars
- List of Serbian paramilitary formations
