= 2001 Special Operations Unit mutiny (Serbia) =

Anti-ICTY mutiny in Serbia and Montenegro

- Special Operations Unit blocking the highway in Belgrade
- Date: 9 November 2001 – 17 November 2001
- Location: Serbia, FR Yugoslavia
- Caused by: Arrest of the Banović brothers; Cooperation with the ICTY; Opposition to the Government of Serbia
- Methods: Mutiny; roadblocks
- Result: Protest ended: Tactical JSO victory, some objectives are achieved; Dismissals of the heads of the State Security Directorate; Assassination of Zoran Đinđić in 2003

Parties
Special Operations Unit; Zemun Clan Support: President of FR Yugoslavia; Democratic Party of Serbia; Socialist Party of Serbia; Serbian Radical Party; New Serbia	(Republic of Serbia (1992–2006)) Government of Serbia Support: Democratic Party; New Democracy; Christian Democratic Party of Serbia

Lead figures
Milorad Ulemek; Franko Simatović; Dušan Maričić; Zvezdan Jovanović; Dušan Spasojević; Miladin Suvajdžić; Zoran Vukojević	Zoran Đinđić; Čedomir Jovanović; Vladan Batić; Dušan Mihajlović; Sreten Lukić; Goran Petrović; Zoran Mijatović

On 9 November 2001, soldiers of the Special Operations Unit (JSO), an elite special forces police unit of the FR Yugoslavia State Security Directorate (RDB), also known as the Red Berets, raised a mutiny in response to the arrest and extradition of the Banović brothers, indicted for war crimes before the International Criminal Tribunal for the former Yugoslavia (ICTY) and the group's opposition to the Government of Serbia headed by Prime Minister Zoran Đinđić. The mutiny ended on 17 November 2001 after certain concessions had been given to the Unit and the key figures in the State Security Directorate were dismissed.

The mutiny was the forerunner of major political upheavals in Serbia, one of which was the assassination of Zoran Đinđić in 2003.

== Background ==
=== Overthrow of Milošević ===
During the overthrow of Slobodan Milošević in October 2000, the Special Operations Unit (JSO) played a significant role. The Unit's commander Milorad Ulemek made an agreement with opposition leader Zoran Đinđić which resulted in Ulemek refusing to carry out Milošević's order to open fire on the anti-government protesters in Belgrade.

=== Arrest of Milošević and split within the transitional government ===
The following year, Milošević was arrested and transferred to the International Criminal Tribunal for the former Yugoslavia (ICTY) in the Hague in late June 2001. This became a wedge issue, leading to a split within the transitional authorities and the formation of an "anti-Hague lobby" centered around Yugoslav President Vojislav Koštunica. As Koštunica distanced himself from the ruling DOS coalition, he created a kind of shadow government grouped around his presidential cabinet. This opened an opportunity for remnants of the Milošević regime to capitalize on the ongoing power struggle between Prime Minister Đinđić and President Koštunica, with the ultimate goal of preserving their interests.

=== Milorad Ulemek's resignation and criminal activities ===
During the year following the overthrow of Milošević, Milorad Ulemek increasingly associated with Dušan Spasojević, allegedly a former JSO member, who was a leader of the Zemun Clan. This was first made clear during the arrest of Spasojević and several Zemun Clan members in May 2001 in France, when Ulemek argued for their release in front of Interior Minister Dušan Mihajlović. After hearing of their arrest, Ulemek started a fire in the disco "Tvrđava" (Fortress) in Kula. He started several incidents in Belgrade's cafes, culminating on 15 June in the cafe "Bojan Stupica", during Ceca Ražnatović's birthday party. The Stupica incident, which included Ulemek threatening police officers while armed, led to his resignation from the Ministry of the Interior on 26 June 2001. Still, Ulemek kept his influence in the JSO, now led by Dušan Maričić "Gumar", and remained its de facto commander. After his resignation, Ulemek continued to enjoy certain privileges afforded to former high-ranking State Security operatives, such as armed guards dispatched from the police force.

Ulemek spent the several following months in Greece, where he was arrested in August 2001 for possessing a forged passport. Ulemek was released after State Security director Goran Petrović submitted a written request to Greek authorities. This arrest further upset him because he had long suspected that he, too, was wanted by the ICTY, and that he could be charged for the Ibar Highway attack. Increasingly paranoid, Ulemek met with Čedomir Jovanović, a member of Đinđić's inner circle, on 5 October 2001 in the Zemun Clan headquarters in Šilerova street. According to Jovanović, Ulemek relayed these fears to him during their meeting, meanwhile boasting of his alliance with Security Directorate chief Aco Tomić.

Another event that made Ulemek feel threatened was ICTY prosecutor Carla Del Ponte's request for information from Interior Minister Mihajlović during her stay in Serbia on 19 October 2001. The information concerned around 200 individuals, including members of the JSO. Ulemek was also scheduled to appear before the court as a witness in the Ibar Highway case on 12 November. He was later himself indicted in the case and was sentenced to 40 years in prison.

== Immediate causes ==
The immediate cause for the mutiny was the arrest of Predrag Banović and Nenad Banović, two brothers who were indicted for war crimes committed during the Bosnian War in Keraterm camp, and their subsequent extradition to the ICTY. The arrest was carried out by the JSO on 8 November 2001 in Obrenovac. During the mutiny, the JSO claimed they had no knowledge that the brothers would be extradited to the ICTY following their arrest, and that they considered the extradition to be "unlawful and unconstitutional". However, according to deputy State Security director Zoran Mijatović, the JSO was informed of the fact in a meeting on 7 November attended by commander Dušan Maričić and reserve commander Zvezdan Jovanović, and had not protested during the meeting.

Another possible underlying reason for the mutiny was that the Banović brothers were former members of the Wolves of Vučjak paramilitary unit, closely aligned with the JSO, which could have raised fears that some members of the JSO might be arrested in the future.

== Mutiny ==
On the evening of 9 November 2001, the Special Operations Unit disobeyed the State Security Service and most of its members withdrew from their jobs, including drivers and bodyguards of Serbian government officials. When the mutiny arose, Prime Minister Zoran Đinđić and Interior Minister Dušan Mihajlović were on official business while Goran Petrović, director of the State Security Directorate, was on vacation. Petrović informed deputy director Zoran Mijatović in the evening. Around that time, he also informed Čedomir Jovanović who tried to establish contact with the Zemun Clan in Šilerova, where he left a message for Ulemek.

That same evening, the JSO barricaded themselves inside their headquarters, a training center built on the site of the former salaš Štolc in Kula. There, they held a press conference from the memorial room, a space decorated with images of members who were killed in action, as well as maps describing their activities during the Yugoslav Wars. Their demands were read out to a group of journalists by a man who introduced himself as "major Batić", later identified as Vladimir Potić. These included the enactment of a law on cooperation with the ICTY and the dismissal of Interior Minister Dušan Mihajlović. The demand for a law on cooperation with the ICTY corresponded to President Koštunica's views on this matter. While there is no evidence that he was directly involved, his support for the mutineers gave the JSO additional legitimacy in the eyes of the public. In fact, his command over the army stopped the Government from resorting to a military solution to the crisis. Additional informal demands were established later, including the removal of Goran Petrović from his position of director.

On 10 November, the JSO refused all communication with the government institutions. That day, the Unit blocked a loop of the E75 highway near Vrbas from around 1 PM to 3 PM.

Prime Minister Zoran Đinđić returned from his visit to the United States on 11 November. In the afternoon, he chaired a meeting held at the Ministry of Internal Affairs. At this meeting, Đinđić asked Sreten Lukić for a direct answer to the question of whether the police could prevent JSO in its potential attempt to occupy the government building and he received a negative answer. Čedomir Jovanović got a coded letter from Milorad Ulemek during the day inviting him and Đinđić to the JSO headquarters to negotiate. In the evening, Đinđić visited the center of the Special Operations Units in Kula. Talks were held for three hours in order to calm the situation and find a solution. The statement, which was distributed to the journalists points out that Đinđić accepted the reasons for the protest, but was not ready to support them.

=== Highway blockade in Belgrade ===
On Monday, 12 November at around 5:20 AM, about 70 armed members of the Special Operations Unit blocked the highway through Belgrade near Sava Centar in the direction of the Gazela Bridge with their Humvee vehicles. Among the rebels was Zvezdan Jovanović, later sentenced to 40 years in prison for the assassination of Đinđić. At around 7:30 AM, Goran Petrović sent his deputy Zoran Mijatović to negotiate with the Unit. Mijatović came to the blockade at around 8 AM, where he talked to Maričić and threatened him with an ICTY indictment. Mijatović was incorrect, seeing as neither Maričić nor any other members of the JSO, apart from Franko Simatović, were ever indicted by the ICTY. During the negotiations on the highway, Mijatović also threatened Maričić saying the population in the surrounding buildings consisted mainly of former and current army officers, many of whom owned weapons. Meanwhile, the Special Anti-Terrorist Unit of the Ministry of the Interior was on full alert that day and the day before. The JSO cleared the highway around 3 PM on 12 November.

That afternoon, Milorad Ulemek testified at the trial for the murders on the Ibar Highway. He came to court together with several armed men, which affected other witnesses who refused to testify at the hearing out of fear. After leaving the courtroom, Ulemek told the media that he supported the mutiny and that everyone had the right to protest in their uniforms. This sentiment was echoed several days later by President Vojislav Koštunica, who justified the JSO protesting armed and uniformed by comparing them to doctors who would protest in their lab coats.

=== Agreements and the end of the mutiny ===
On 13 November, Deputy Prime Minister Čedomir Jovanović and Interior Minister Dušan Mihajlović went to Kula to negotiate an end to the mutiny. The JSO demanded that Mihajlović resign from the position of minister, to which he agreed. However, Jovanović took the written resignation from his hands and tore it up. A fight broke out and Zvezdan Jovanović threatened Čedomir Jovanović with a knife. It was agreed that Mihajlović should present a letter of resignation to the Government.

The following day, the Government of Serbia declined Mihajlović's resignation, but accepted the resignation of State Security director Goran Petrović and his deputy Zoran Mijatović. Mihajlović made Andreja Savić acting director the day after on 15 November.

Following the negotiations with the Special Operations Unit, some concessions were given and Goran Petrović was removed from the position of director of the State Security and Andreja Savić was appointed in his place permanently, while Milorad Bracanović was appointed his deputy. Bracanović was a security officer for the JSO before the mutiny. This position was later occupied by Veselin Lečić. The Unit was reassigned from the State Security Directorate to the Public Security Service and it was agreed upon that the Unit can be used only be the order of the minister and with the approval of the Government of Serbia. Đinđić refrained from dissolving the JSO in the name of preserving stability.

The mutiny ended on 17 November 2001, at around 7 AM, when armored personnel carriers and armed guards who had been there throughout the uprising were removed from the entrance to the JSO base. The base was visited by Andreja Savić and Sreten Lukić.

=== Role of the Zemun Clan ===
Dušan Spasojević, the leader of the Zemun Clan, was one of the main organizers of the mutiny. In the intercepted telephone conversations between him and JSO commander Dušan Maričić, held on 9 and 11 November, Spasojević discussed the mutiny, the next steps JSO needs to take and how to tactically coordinate the event's media coverage.

According to the testimony of Zoran Vukojević "Vuk", a protected witness in the trial for the assassination of Zoran Đinđić, members of the Zemun Clan visited the Special Operations Unit base in Kula every day during the uprising and influenced journalists. He also testified that Spasojević was planning on making lawyer Gradimir Nalić the Interior Minister if Mihajlović were to resign.

Additionally, on 12 November, district prosecutor Rade Terzić informed the Fourth Municipal Prosecutors' Office that the JSO was demanding the release of Mile Luković "Kum" and several other Zemun Clan members from custody. His request was declined. Terzić later released Luković from custody himself, due to lack of evidence, on 16 November.

== Responses and reactions ==
President of FR Yugoslavia Vojislav Koštunica supported the rebellion, saying that "these were people who did not endanger the country's security". At one point, he seemingly quoted a public statement by Milorad Ulemek on the matter, justifying the JSO protesting fully armed and uniformed. Later, Koštunica would assess the coincidence of his statement with Ulemek's as "unimportant". Rade Bulatović, Koštunica's security advisor and later State Security Service director, supported Savić and Bracanović at the helm of the Service, publishing the article "Pobeda patriotizma" (Victory of Patriotism) on the topic in the March 2002 issue of NIN magazine. Koštunica's potential role in the mutiny would repeatedly come into question in the following years. Goran Petrović has described the event as a "counter-revolution" prepared by Koštunica.

The president of New Serbia Velimir Ilić supported the mutiny, with the caveat that it would "complicate the security situation in the country".

The Socialist Party of Serbia also supported the mutiny.

Vice president of the Christian Democratic Party of Serbia Živojin Stijepić opposed the mutiny and said the leaders of the JSO should be replaced.

Deputy Prime Minister Momčilo Perišić attributed the event to post-traumatic stress disorder.

Minister of Agriculture Dragan Veselinov and the Social Democratic Union led by Deputy Prime Minister Žarko Korać advocated for a dissolution of the JSO following the mutiny.

Milorad Ulemek was interviewed for the magazine ID on 21 November by Gradiša Katić, later arrested during Operation Sabre. In the interview, he insisted the event was a protest instead of a mutiny, saying "if it were a mutiny, we would have taken over all Government offices by Saturday".

== Aftermath ==
On 12 March 2003, Đinđić was assassinated in the yard of the Serbian government headquarters. He was killed by Zvezdan Jovanović, the then assistant commander of the Special Operations Unit. On 25 March 2003, the Special Operations Unit was disbanded.

In June 2003, a document from the Military Security Administration was uncovered describing a meeting that took place in November 2001 between Security Directorate chief Aco Tomić, President Koštunica's advisor Rade Bulatović, former RSK Prime Minister Borislav Mikelić, Milorad Ulemek and Dušan Spasojević, during which Tomić guaranteed that the Cobras military police unit would not intervene against the JSO. Tomić denied the validity of this document, stating that the meeting took place only in August or September 2002 when Spasojević wished to congratulate him for the arrest of Momčilo Perišić and Mikelić agreed to introduce the two.

The indictment for the assassination of Prime Minister Đinđić states that the JSO mutiny was the "beginning of creating a political environment for the assassination". On 11 November 2010, Đinđić's mother's and sister's lawyer, Srđa Popović, filed a criminal complaint with the Special Prosecutor's Office for Organized Crime against Ulemek, Maričić, Koštunica, Tomić and five others for the participation in the mutiny.

The indictment was raised on 9 March 2012, but ultimately discarded the complaint against Vojislav Koštunica and Aco Tomić. The Higher Court in Belgrade found the accused not guilty in the first instance in July 2018, after which the Appellate Court acquitted them in June 2019.

== Literature ==
- Vasić, Miloš (2005). Atentat na Zorana (in Serbian). Belgrade: Politika, Vreme, B92, Narodna knjiga. ISBN 978-86-331-1949-8.
- Ostojić, Mladen (2014). Between Justice and Stability: The Politics of War Crimes Prosecutions in Post-Milošević Serbia. Farnham: Ashgate Publishing. pp. 68–74. ISBN 9781409467434.
