= Čedomir Jovanović =

Serbian politician (born 1971)

- Чедомир Јовановић
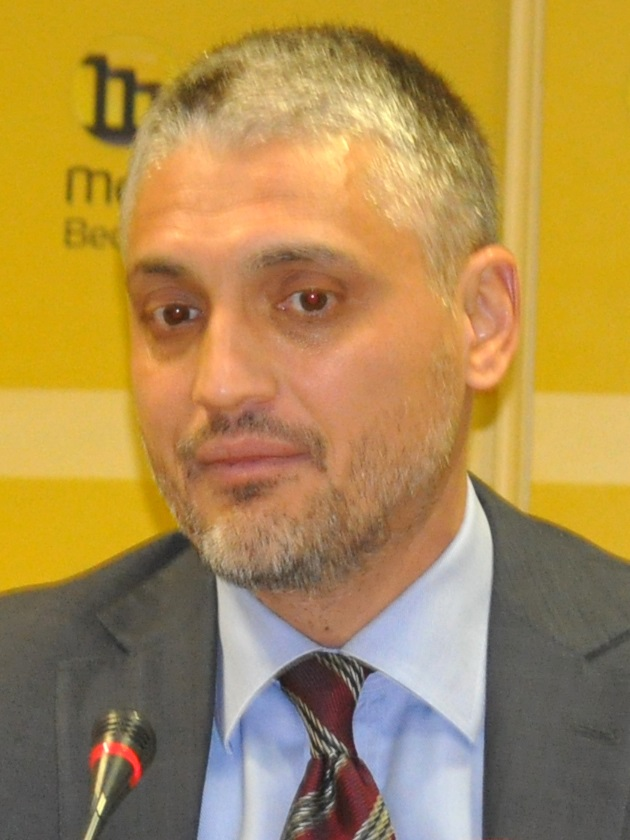
- Jovanović in 2015

Deputy Prime Minister of Serbia
- In office 18 March 2003 – 3 March 2004
- Prime Minister: Zoran Živković

Personal details
- Born: 13 April 1971 (age 55) Belgrade, SR Serbia, Yugoslavia
- Party: DS (1998–2005); LDP (2005–present)
- Spouse: Jelena Savić
- Education: University of Arts in Belgrade
- Occupation: politician; businessman
- Profession: dramaturg; playwriter
- Nickname: Čeda

Military service
- Allegiance: SFR Yugoslavia
- Branch/service: Yugoslav People's Army
- Years of service: 1992
- Battles/wars: Bosnian War

Čedomir "Čeda" Jovanović (Serbian Cyrillic: Чедомир Чеда Јовановић, pronounced [tʃědomir tʃěːda joʋǎːnoʋitɕ]; born 13 April 1971) is a Serbian politician and businessman.

During the presidency of Slobodan Milošević in Yugoslavia, Jovanović became one of the student leaders of the 1996–1997 protests in Serbia at the age of 25. Jovanović along with fellow student Čedomir Antić were one of the founding members of the "Student Political Club", abbreviated in Serbian as SPK, which successfully organised a massive boycott of the 1997 Serbian general election. In February 1998, the bulk of the SPK membership along with Jovanović himself joined the Democratic Party.

After the overthrow of Slobodan Milošević, Jovanović was selected by the Democratic Opposition of Serbia to be one of its MPs, and he subsequently became the youngest parliamentary caucus leader in Serbian history, at the age of 29. In the post-Milošević period, he was a target of several assassination attempts and attacks. On 6 February 2001, an explosive device destroyed Jovanović's automobile. On 31 March 2001, he was left unscathed from a minor shooting incident at the scene of Milošević's arrest, during which he was a negotiator. In July 2002, Minister of Interior Dušan Mihajlović commented that "Jovanović was on all the hit lists" of "centers of power".

Jovanović was expelled from the Democratic Party in 2004 due to breaking party protocols. He subsequently founded his own political party in November 2005, called the Liberal Democratic Party. He was his party's candidate in Serbia's presidential elections in 2008 and 2012.

== Early life ==
Jovanović was born in a middle-class family in Belgrade. His parents Jovica and Milena (née Mršić) Jovanović were both economists by profession. As a boy, he grew up in the New Belgrade neighbourhood and completed the Ivan Gundulić Primary School with average grades. Afterwards, he started attending the Ninth Belgrade Gymnasium, but soon after transferred to the Third Economics High School, from which he eventually graduated. He then enrolled at the University of Belgrade's Faculty of Economics, but after only a week of classes, decided to quit.

Jovanović served in the Yugoslav People's Army in 1992 in Gradiška during the Bosnian War. In one of his memoirs, Čedomir Antić wrote that Jovanović was once proud of his military career in the Bosnian War, but that he experienced an ideological change about the war years later.

Jovanović eventually started attending Belgrade's Arts University's Faculty of Dramatic Arts (FDU), enrolling in its dramaturgy program, from which he graduated in 1998 at the age of 27. He never actually worked in his chosen profession, writing only a couple of plays that were never staged or published.

== Activism ==
Jovanović was one of the student leaders of student protests in Belgrade during the winter of 1996–1997. The leaders of the demonstrations mostly composed of the membership of the SPK, an abbreviation for the Serbian Political Club. During the three months of demonstrations, Jovanović, Čedomir Antić, and other SPK members were unwittingly followed and tracked by the State Security Service. Throughout the winter of 1996–1997, violent clashes with the state police and military occurred on multiple occasions. As a result of the clashes Jovanović was one of five representatives of the protest movement which met with General Momčilo Perišić and Internal Affairs Minister Zoran Sokolović. General Perišić told Jovanović that both the military and students "are above politics", and claimed to sympathise with the protest movement. However, the meeting with Minister Sokolović was far more tense, as Sokolović largely stonewalled Jovanović on the question of a protester named Predrag Starčević, who was killed on 24 December 1996.

After the protests died out in early 1997, Jovanović intended on quitting political activity for good. However, in a series of SPK meetings, Jovanović and Čedomir Antić debated on the future of the SPK, with Jovanović arguing that the SPK should join the Democratic Party. Antić eventually agreed, however the SPK virtually ceased to exist as a result, with many members dropping out when SPK joined the Democratic Party. Three SPK members ended up joining the Democratic Party of Serbia, which years later would be involved in an intense schism with the rest of the DOS coalition.

== Political career ==
=== Democratic Opposition of Serbia ===
He was elected to the Serbian Parliament in the 23 December 2000, parliamentary elections, on the list of the Democratic Opposition of Serbia (DOS), and also held the post of DOS' parliamentary caucus leader until 2003. At only 29, he was the youngest person ever in Serbian politics to hold such a position.

==== Car bombing ====
On the morning of 6 February 2001, Jovanović sat in a restaurant by the business club "Lutra" to attend a discussion with State Security executive Franko Simatović, the Minister of Interior Dušan Mihajlović, and Milorad Ulemek, who organised the meeting. Jovanović and Mihajlović asked Simatović about the Ibar Highway assassination attempt on Vuk Drašković, the murder of Slavko Ćuruvija and the disappearance of Ivan Stambolić. Simatović claimed not to know about any of the liquidations, to which Jovanović remarked, "Frenki, you know so little for someone who was second man in the State Security Service."

After the meeting, Jovanović got in his Mitsubishi Pajero to drive his wife to Avalska street in Belgrade. After having walked approximately ten meters away from his vehicle, the Pajero exploded, destroying several other cars in the vicinity. Approximately 30 minutes had elapsed from the meeting with Simatović and the car bomb detonation. The vehicle was left in a parking lot for four days, after which it was taken for investigation by the Yugoslav Institute for Safety. Mitsubishi's European division also investigated and concluded that the cause of the explosion was that of a time bomb. The former head of the Yugoslav State Security Service, Jovica Stanišić, later commented that "someone from our agency did it".

==== Negotiation of Milošević's arrest ====
On 31 March 2001, after a masked government unit stormed Slobodan Milošević's fortified villa, Jovanović negotiated with the former Yugoslav president for him to surrender peacefully. In an interview conducted by Ekspres in June 2016, Jovanović said that as Milošević surrendered himself to the police, his daughter Marija asked him explicitly to commit suicide instead of surrendering. When Milošević gave himself up to the authorities, Jovanović was removed by security after which Marija fired a pistol at the vehicle Jovanović was sitting in. In the same interview, Jovanović admitted that he feared more that Marija would get shot by the bodyguards than he did for his own life during the Milošević villa standoff.

In 2014, Jovanović appeared on a televised episode of Goli život (Naked Life in English) on TV Happy, during which he talked about some of his life experiences. In the interview, Jovanović talked about Milošević and his arrest:

"He was the only Serbian politician who looked like a president. After that I never said anything ugly about him and I refused to testify against Marija Milošević, who on that fateful night shot at me. I knew it was out of desperation and I did not want to make an already hard situation for her even harder."

==== Incidents with the Zemun Clan and JSO ====
In March 2003, following the assassination of Prime Minister Zoran Đinđić, Jovanović advanced to the position of Deputy Prime Minister in the government of the new PM Zoran Živković. It has been alleged that during his mandate as Member of Parliament, in addition to his regular duties, Jovanović assumed the role of Prime Minister Đinđić's government liaison - dealing with, and meeting individuals connected to Serbian organised crime circles.

When the press got a hold of this information, a storm of controversy was created by raising many questions about Jovanovic's role in Government's dealing with the mafia. Political opponents directly accused him of criminal involvement and of providing favours for shady individuals such as Dušan Spasojević (late leader of the Zemun mafia clan) and Milorad Ulemek (now convicted as the person who organised the assassination of Zoran Đinđić). Various rumours, mostly carried and exploited by daily tabloids, included even those that he is using heavy drugs.

After continuous pressure from the media, Jovanović admitted to attending some meetings, but denied any wrongdoing, claiming that these contacts were made on behalf of the government in order to curb mafia activities and to secure political stability from the individuals left over from the Milošević's era. During one of his speeches, he stated: "my hands are dirty, but my conscience is clear (because I was cleaning up Serbia)".

The electorate did not exactly see it that way and Jovanović's popularity dropped drastically as a result of this episode.

Realizing this, the Democratic Party brass marginalised his role within its ranks before the parliamentary elections in December 2003 by not even entering his name on the party's electoral ballot. He did not complain, at least not publicly, opting to instead focus on the coming party congress in February 2004 that was to determine its new post-Đinđić leadership. Jovanović was hoping to get a seat on the main board, but did not receive enough delegate support.

=== Split with the Democratic Party ===
Dissatisfied with the party's new direction under the leadership of Boris Tadić, Jovanović criticised him publicly, most notably for his policy of political cohabitation with Prime Minister Vojislav Koštunica's government. Being a fierce Koštunica opponent, Jovanović felt that the Democratic Party should actively seek ways to bring down his government, especially when Boris Tadić was elected President of the Republic in June 2004. A couple of months after Tadić's inauguration, Jovanović wrote his party colleague an open public letter on a per tu basis criticising his political choices. Tadić never even acknowledged the letter publicly until he was directly asked about it during an interview on a weekly political TV talk show Utisak nedelje. He admitted that he had not really bothered to read it and added: "When someone writes a letter, supposedly to me, by first making sure it gets published in the papers, then that's really not a letter but a political bid".

After his unsuccessful attempt to take over the DS leadership, Jovanović formed the "Liberal Democratic faction" within DS - knowingly breaching the party statute. The act was obviously not welcomed by the leadership and he was eventually expelled on 3 December 2004.

In the following period, Jovanović's political activity became distinctly more direct. He gave bombastic interviews and in his strongly worded press releases frequently went after PM Koštunica's government officials, Koštunica himself, and the Serbian security apparatus. He repeatedly criticised the Serbian Orthodox Church, calling it dishonest, backward and dogmatic, protesting what he sees to be its interference in the country's politics.

Parallel to all of this Jovanović also founded a non-governmental organisation called Center for Modern Politics (Centar za modernu politiku, CMP), but its activities were sporadic at best and it eventually folded.

In July 2005, Jovanović published a book, Moj sukob sa prošlošću ("My Confrontation with the Past"). He came out in favour of Kosovo's independence, thus becoming the only notable Serbian political party leader to do so and because of that he gained sympathies from many Albanians.

=== Founding of the Liberal Democratic Party ===
On 5 November 2005, Jovanović and his supporters founded the Liberal Democratic Party (LDP) to much fanfare, and Jovanović was elected as its first president at the age of 34.

Soon after, in December, he was the subject of a lengthy, very affirmative piece penned by Zoran Ćirjaković in the influential American weekly magazine Newsweek which, among other things, Jovanović used to further reiterate his stance on Kosovo and to declare his opinion that Bosnian Serb ties with Belgrade should effectively be severed.

The first parliamentary elections Jovanović led his party in were held in January 2007. LDP's electoral list also featured several minority parties and Nenad Čanak's League of Vojvodina's Socialdemocrats (LSV). With an aggressive "Od nas zavisi" campaign, he was hoping to ensure enough votes for LDP to become a significant factor when it comes to forming the ruling coalition. However, LDP received about 5-6% of the total vote, barely clearing the 5% threshold required to enter the parliament.

==== November 2007 Mišković affair ====
In November 2007, in anticipation of presidential election, Jovanović opened a public row with powerful and politically connected Serbian tycoon Miroslav Mišković. On Sunday, 18 November 2007, while guest on Utisak nedelje, a weekly television political talk-show, Jovanović claimed Mišković tried to get himself off the US entry visa blacklist, in exchange offering the American embassy in Belgrade to arrange prime minister Koštunica's cooperative and soft stance when it comes to the final status of the Serbian province of Kosovo whose independence America firmly supported.

Amid the controversy that was immediately raised, the next day, Monday, Jovanović went on B92 radio's morning talk-show Kažiprst, claiming that Mišković's liaison in this particular endeavour with the Americans was a well-known Belgrade journalist, stopping short of revealing his name. However, later that day, talking in the Serbian parliament, Jovanović revealed the journalist to be Bratislav "Braca" Grubačić. Mišković responded late in the day with a strongly worded press release, directly addressing Jovanović on a per tu basis, accusing him of being involved in Mišković's eighteen-hour kidnapping in 2001 and of pocketing DM5 million from the ransom payment. Jovanović responded by filing an official complaint against Mišković in the Serbian police and publicly releasing a 4-page supposed internal Belgrade's American embassy document dated May 2007 in support of his earlier statements. The document was posted on Blic and B92 web sites. The US embassy in Belgrade, at the time headed by ambassador Cameron Munter, denied Jovanović's claims as well as the authenticity of the document Jovanović forwarded to the Serbian media.

Years later in 2011, a leaked diplomatic cable written by Munter from the Belgrade embassy claimed that Jovanović used a forged document in his accusations against Mišković.

== 2008 presidential campaign ==
Jovanović was a candidate in the 2008 Serbian Presidential elections held in January. He was running under the slogan "Život je zakon!" (eng. "Life Rules") while emphasising his determination to bring down every person inside or outside the Serbian government who "oppose the idea of providing a better life for the people of Serbia". Once again, Jovanović has directly accused Miroslav Mišković, a Serbian tycoon, of being one of the most responsible persons for the underdevelopment of Serbia in the recent years.

He finished fifth with 5.34% of the total votes, well behind Boris Tadić and Tomislav Nikolić who went into the second round runoff. Ahead of the second round vote, despite expectations from some circles, Jovanović decided not to throw his support behind Tadić, opting instead to stay neutral. Tadić ended up winning the election regardless.

== 2012 presidential campaign ==
For the second presidential election in a row, Jovanović was a candidate in the 2012 presidential elections in Serbia, held in May that year. His campaign included an internationally televised debate with President of Republika Srpska Milorad Dodik. In the debate, Jovanović defended a previous statement he made saying that "Republika Srpska was founded on genocide and ethnic cleansing", referring particularly to the Srebrenica massacre. The debate exceeded its allotted time on television as the moderator failed to control the dialogue.

Jovanović finished in sixth overall in the 2012 presidential election, recording 5.03% of the national vote.

== Controversy ==
In March 2011, during a parliamentary session about the 2011 Libyan civil war, Jovanović tried to criticise Serbia's Foreign Minister Vuk Jeremić on his visits to various countries in Africa at the time. Jovanović said "instead of going to the cannibals in Africa, he should react to the plight of the civilians in Libya." The Algerian Ambassador to Serbia, Abdelkader Mesdoua, subsequently issued a statement to Vuk Jeremić, saying that Jovanović's statements were racist and that he should apologise in the National Assembly of Serbia.

On 2 June 2021, Jovanović participated in a fight in Belgrade during which he destroyed the glass window of a fast-food restaurant by throwing a chair at it.

== Personal life ==
His wife, Jelena, is from Nevesinje, Bosnia and Herzegovina She is the owner of "Agroposlovi", a Belgrade based business that operates a larger company named Fidelinka from Subotica, Serbia. Fidelinka offers flour products, pasta, breads, pastries, confectioneries, and starch. Jovanović is cited as a manager in Fidelinka. He is the father of four children. He has received death threats on several occasions because of his political commitment, in particular because of his support for Kosovo's independence. In 2001 he survived an assassination attempt when a bomb was activated in his car. He and his family have since lived under police protection.
