= Radomir Marković =

Serbian intelligence officer (born 1946)

- Born: 11 August 1946 (age 80); Lukavac, PR Bosnia and Herzegovina, Yugoslavia
- Citizenship: Serbian
- Occupation: Head of the State Security Directorate
- Years active: 1998–2001
- Status: Incarcerated
- Criminal charges: Orchestration of the Ibar Highway assassination attempt
- Penalty: 40 years imprisonment

Details
- Victims: 4
- Date: 3 October 1999; 12:15 PM (Central European Time)
- Country: Serbia
- Locations: near the village of Petka, near Lazarevac, FR Yugoslavia
- Target: Vuk Drašković
- Killed: 4 (Drašković's associates)
- Injured: 1 (Drašković)

Radomir "Rade" Marković (Serbian Cyrillic: Радомир Марковић; born 11 August 1946) is a Serbian former intelligence officer who served as the head of the state security agency SDB within the Ministry of Internal Affairs of Serbia from 1998 to 2001. In 2008, the Supreme Court of Serbia sentenced Marković to 40 years' imprisonment for orchestrating a 1999 attack on Serbian opposition politician Vuk Drašković. During his career which lasted from 1970 until 2001, he served several and head positions of the Serbian Police during the 1990s and as the assistant Minister of Internal Affairs (August 1993 – 1994).

== Head of security service ==
Marković was born to a Bosnian Serb family in Lukavac, Yugoslavia, in present-day Bosnia and Herzegovina. Under Yugoslav president Slobodan Milošević, Marković was appointed to succeed Jovica Stanišić as the head of the RDB on 27 October 1998. After Milošević lost the 2000 Yugoslav presidential election to challenger Vojislav Koštunica, Marković formally resigned his position on 25 January 2001.

== Arrest and trials ==
Marković was arrested by Yugoslav police in February 2001 and was charged with committing "the criminal act of abuse of official position" by organising the 1999 Ibar Highway assassination attempt of Vuk Drašković, which resulted in the deaths of four people. Marković was found guilty by the Belgrade District Court and on 18 July 2005 was sentenced to 15 years' imprisonment. However, in May 2006, the Supreme Court of Serbia set aside the District Court verdict and ordered a retrial. At his retrial, Marković was again convicted and sentenced to eight years' imprisonment.

The verdict of the District Court was again overturned by the Supreme Court, and Marković was tried again, this time by a panel of Supreme Court judges. On 19 June 2008, Marković was convicted by the Supreme Court and sentenced to the maximum 40 years' imprisonment.

== Witness in Milošević trial ==
On 26 July 2002, Marković appeared as a witness before the International Criminal Tribunal for the former Yugoslavia in the trial of Slobodan Milošević. During his testimony, Marković admitted to have signed a document against the former Yugoslav president under pressure, being threatened because of his judicial position. He also stated that for his anti-Milošević testimony he and his family were offered a new life, with a new identity and money in a foreign country.
