= Čedomir Antić =

Serbian historian and political activist

Čedomir Antić PhD
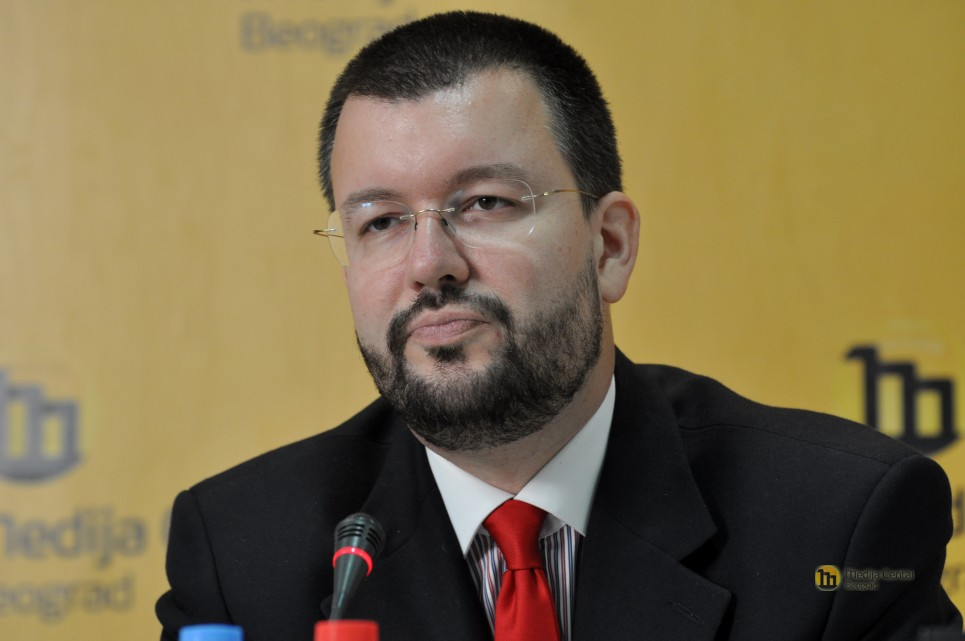
- Antić at a conference in 2014

Personal details
- Born: 9 October 1974 (age 52) Belgrade, SFR Yugoslavia
- Spouse: Ivana Antić

Čedomir Antić (Serbian Cyrillic: Чедомир Антић, Serbian pronunciation: [tʃědomir ǎːntitɕ]; born 9 October 1974) is a Serbian historian, professor at The University of Belgrade Faculty of Philosophy and a political activist.

== Student activism ==
During the 1996–1997 protests in Serbia, Antić was the long-standing chairman of the protest's Main Council (Parliament). Previously, Antić was one of the protest leaders at the Faculty of Philosophy. After the student protest had reached its triumphant end, Antić had, together with several colleagues (Čedomir Jovanović, Vladimir Dobrosavljević, Igor Žeželj, Saša Ćirić, and others) organized the Student Political Club (SPK). SPK was the first student party in history of Serbia. It led a boycott campaign of the 1997 elections. SPK called for political reforms and opted for new national, economic and regional policy. In 1998, SPK merged into the Democratic Party, at the time the strongest non-parliamentary political party in Serbia. Zoran Đinđić, then the party leader, named Antić as the party spokesman.

== Scholarly career ==
Čedomir Antić graduated from History at the University of Belgrade in 1999 as the first in his generation. Antić attended an MA course in Contemporary history at the University of Bristol (2001/02). He also took an MPhil in Modern history (2003) at the University of Belgrade. In 2008 Antić obtained a PhD in history from the University of Belgrade. His PhD thesis is titled Great Britain and Serbia during the 1914–18 War. Čedomir Antić has been a fellow at the Institute for Balkan Studies of the Serbian Academy of Sciences and Arts since 2000.

In 2000, the Association of University Professors and Scientist of Serbia (Udruženje univerzitetskih profesora i naučnika Srbije) awarded Antić with the title of the best student in Serbia. Antić's book, Ralph Paget: A Diplomat in Serbia, was awarded by North American Society for Serbian Studies as the best monograph published in 2006 written in English.

Since November 2022, Čedomir Antić is a professor at the Department of History, Faculty of Philosophy in Belgrade. He was elected associate professor in 2018, and assistant professor in 2013.

Antić has published several books on the modern and contemporary political history of Serbia and the Serbs, including Tha History of The Republic of Srpska (Istorija Republike Srpske, 2015), Republicanism in Serbia (Republikanizam u Srbiji, 2022), and the New Serbian Historical Atlas (Novi srpski istorijski atlas, 2022).

== Political stance ==
Čedomir Antić was regarded as an intellectual among the leadership of the Student Protest 1996/1997. He was prominent for his reformist attitude, but it was indicated that he was an enlightened patriot as well. When the Student Political Club joined the Democratic Party, Antić was the only one who was given a high position in the party. However, due to Čedomir Jovanović's personal dealings and ambitions in the Democratic Party, SPK members failed to create a wing in the party, and Antić was soon marginalized. Antić withdrew from political life after 2000. He was a member of the first executive board of the University of Belgrade since the beginning of the democratic changes and took part in the governmental commission for drafting the Public Holidays Law.

Dissatisfied by aspects of political transition in Serbia and disillusioned after corruption scandals in the Democratic Party, Antić entered politics again. In 2002 he published his state and national program "The Draft: Independent Serbia in the European Union" ("Nacrt: Nezavisna Srbija u Evropskoj uniji"). In the Draft he advocated for the dissolution of the dysfunctional union between Serbia and Montenegro and a "historical compromise" between the Republic of Serbia and ethnic Albanians from Kosovo. Even though he left the possibility for the reintegration of Kosovo into Serbia, Antić opted for a peaceful and democratic division of Kosovo. He advocated for a new political beginning for Serbia, the establishment of a firm, functional, but economically and politically fully regionalised state.

The Draft was adopted as political program of the newly established party G17 Plus. G17 Plus came fourth in parliamentary elections of 2003 (its political club in parliament was the third in number of MPs). Soon after, Antić was elected the youngest member of the G17 Plus presidency. After the establishment of the first Koštunica government (DSS – G17 – SPO/NS), Antic became the political advisor of Deputy Prime Minister Miroljub Labus. In government, Antic was known as an independent and bold critic of the general politics and policies. He played an important role in writing the Labus Plan for Kosovo (2004), defended the government in the crisis over cooperation with the ICTY (from January to March 2005), and was firm in M. Labus public defence during "the Ericsson Scandal" in 2005. However, his firm stand over Montenegro and Kosovo, and popularity within G17 Plus, alienated the party leadership from Antic. After Labus resigned and left the party leadership in May 2006, Antic supported the party's Vice-President Mlađan Dinkic. Nevertheless, Antic's candidacy for vice-presidency was "banned" and abolished in September 2006 from within the party. Čedomir Antic resisted, rejected to stay in the party leadership and later on left the party.

During the 2024 student protests and faculty blockades, which were sparked by the tragic deaths of 15 individuals in Novi Sad, Čedomir Antić publicly voiced his opposition to the blockades.

== Progressive Club ==
In July 2007 Čedomir Antić founded the Progressive Club (Napredni Klub, NK), a political NGO which continues conservative and modernist traditions of the 19th century Serbian Progressive Party.. NK regularly publishes annual reports about the Political rights of Serbs in the region (Izveštaj o političkim pravima srpskog naroda u regionu), and has published several influential documents and platforms regarding social and political reform in Serbia.

Čedomir Antić has been the youngest member of the Crown Council of H.R.H. Prince Alexander II of Serbia since 2002.

== Books ==
History

- A Country of Holidays and a City of Monuments, Velika Plana 2004.
- Velika Britanija, Srbija i Krimski rat (1853–1856), Belgrade 2004.
- Kratka istorija Srbije (1804–2004), Belgrade 2004.
- Istorija i zabluda, Belgrade 2005.
- Ralph Paget: A Diplomat in Serbia, Belgrade 2006.
- Neutrality as Independence: Great Britain, Serbia and the Crimean War, Belgrade, 2007.
- Četrnaesti vojvoda i devet baba: iz društvene istorije novovekovne Srbije, Belgrade, 2009.
- Neizabrana saveznica: Srbija i Velika Britanija u Prvom svetskom ratu, Belgrade, 2012.
- Антић, Чедомир; Кецмановић, Ненад (2015). Историја Републике Српске (1 ed.). Београд: SAS Intelligence, Српска књижевна задруга.
  - Антић, Чедомир; Кецмановић, Ненад (2016a). Историја Републике Српске (The History of the Republic of Srpska) (2 ed.). Београд: Двије круне.
    - Антић, Чедомир; Кецмановић, Ненад (2016b). Историја Републике Српске (3 ed.). Београд: Недељник.
- Uvod u istorijske studije, Belgrade, 2017.

Politics

- Nezavisna Srbija, Beograd 2006.
- Studentska fronda: secanje na Studentski protest 1996/1997 – o petnaestogodisnjici

== See also ==
- Progressive Club
- Politics of Serbia
