= Danica Drašković =

Serbian lawyer and politician

- Даница Драшковић
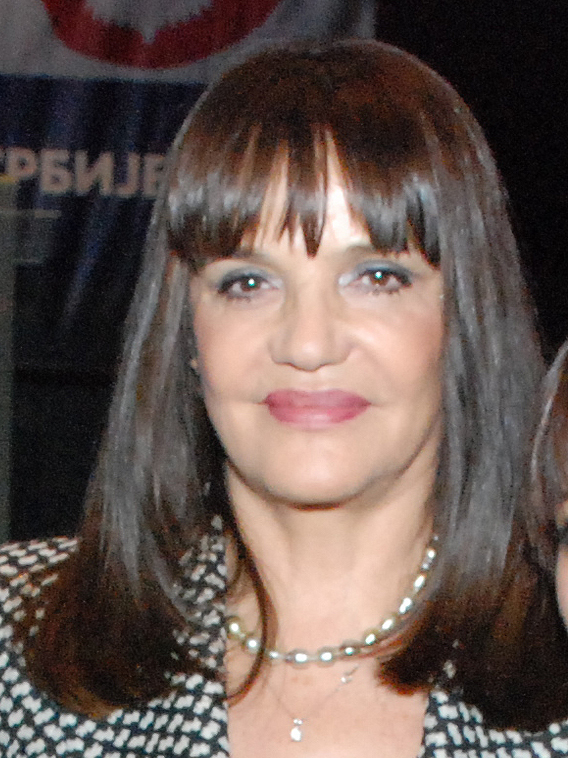
- Drašković in 2010
- Born: Danica Bošković; 14 November 1945 (age 80); Kolašin, FS Montenegro, DF Yugoslavia
- Other name: Dana
- Education: University of Belgrade
- Occupations: Lawyer; politician; journalist
- Political party: Serbian Renewal Movement
- Spouse: Vuk Drašković (m. 1973)

Danica Drašković (Serbian Cyrillic: Даница Драшковић, née Bošković; born 14 November 1945) is a Serbian lawyer, writer, and politician. She is the wife of Vuk Drašković, the co-founder and former president of the Serbian Renewal Movement and former minister of foreign affairs of Serbia.

Born in Kolašin, Montenegro, Drašković was educated at the Faculty of Law of the University of Belgrade. She became prominent in Serbian politics in the 1990s as the wife of Vuk Drašković and because of her newspaper columns. Drašković served as a member of the management board of Naftna Industrija Srbije (NIS) from 2009 to 2013, and since 2014 she has served as a member of the Board of Directors of NIS. On June 20, 2025, Danica Drašković and the former mayor of Zrenjanin Goran Knežević were dismissed from the position of members of the board of directors of the company NIS. Their place was occupied by the former Minister of Environmental Protection Irena Vujović and the former mayor of Novi Sad Milan Đurić.

== Early life and education ==
Danica Bošković was born on 14 November 1945 in Kolašin, Federated State of Montenegro, Democratic Federal Yugoslavia as the third child in a wealthy family. Her father was a Chetnik. After finishing her education in a gymnasium in Bijelo Polje, she rolled into the Faculty of Law of the University of Belgrade. She graduated from the University of Belgrade in 1968.

== Career ==
=== Post-graduation ===
After graduating from the University of Belgrade, Drašković worked as a financial inspector in the Social Accounting Service and as a city judge for misdemeanours in the City Assembly of Belgrade until 1974. With her now-husband Vuk Drašković, she lived in Zambia until 1977, due to Drašković being a correspondent for news agency Tanjug. She worked as a lawyer after returning to Belgrade.

=== 1990s ===
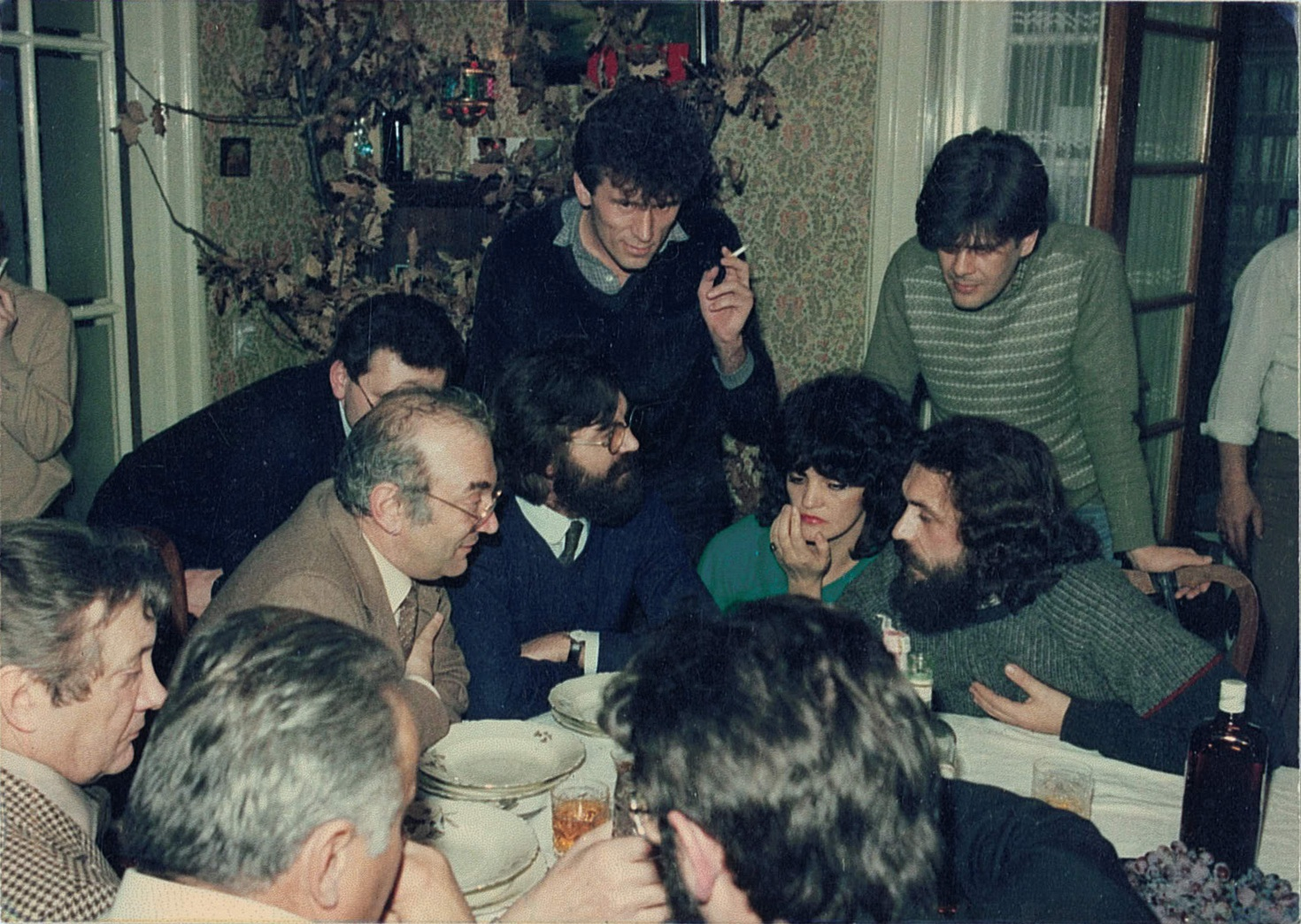
Drašković and her husband in 1984

Drašković officially entered politics once the Serbian Renewal Movement (SPO) was founded in March 1990. Her husband has been the president of SPO since its establishment. Despite being most known for being Drašković's wife, she has made a political profile for herself in the early 1990s. She participated with musician Olivera Katarina at a women's rights rally, has taken part in a Novi Sad rally against Vojvodina autonomists, and has protested in front of the embassies of Albania and Romania. She was also involved in attacking special forces and policemen at Ravna Gora. Throughout the rest of the 1990s, Drašković has taken part in various anti-government protests.

Despite not holding any important positions inside SPO, Drašković has influenced the ideology and actions of the party. She has been cited as the main reason behind the dissolution of the Together coalition in 1997, the successful motion of no confidence of mayor of Belgrade Zoran Đinđić, and the decision for SPO to join the federal government led by Slobodan Milošević's Socialist Party of Serbia. In October 1999, her husband was the target in the Ibar Highway assassination attempt; the assassination was made on the orders of Milošević.

=== 2000s ===
SPO submitted a request to appoint Drašković as the director of the Institute of Security in 2004. Drašković has described herself as an "expert in that place" due to her previous work as a lawyer and a judge. This request became a subject of ridicule in Serbian politics. Once SPO joined Vojislav Koštunica's government in 2004, it was alleged that Drašković was the one who chose her husband's diplomatic team. Media speculated that Drašković would be appointed director of Telekom Srbija in 2008. In response to the speculations, Drašković has said that she is "competent enough to perform the function of the director"; she was never appointed director of Telekom Srbija.

=== Since 2009 ===
Drašković was appointed member of the management board of Naftna Industrija Srbije (NIS) on 1 April 2009. Journalist Tamara Skrozza has said that the public made speculations and theories about the reason of her appointment. She served in the management board until 2013 and in 2014 she became a member of the board of directors of NIS. As the member of the Board of Directors of NIS, she earns RSD 771,000 a month. She has been re-appointed several times since then, most recently being in 2023. Due to her earning of RSD 771,000 a month, she is a millionaire, having earned more than a million euros since her initial appointment in 2009. Zorana Mihajlović, a government minister, unsuccessfully tried to dismiss Drašković and two other members from their positions in late 2020. The assembly of NIS later re-selected Drašković and the two members to continue serving their positions.

In June 2025, Danica Drašković and the former mayor of Zrenjanin Goran Knežević were dismissed from the position of members of the board of directors of the company NIS. Their place was occupied by the former Minister of Environmental Protection Irena Vujović and the former mayor of Novi Sad Milan Đurić.

She has written opinion articles for newspaper Danas.

== Political positions ==
Drašković is an anti-communist. Skrozza has written that Drašković received controversy due to "not caring about the consequences for her or her husband" about the hardline views she expressed in her columns. "I do not change my views and opinions even under coercion", Drašković has said. When her husband called for nonviolent resistance against Milošević, Drašković has said that "Miloševićs deserved nothing more than to be crucified by the people on their horses' tails". She has also criticised the nationalism of Milošević and Dobrica Ćosić. Sociologist Ana Vuković has claimed that Drašković had left a rather negative image of female politicians in Serbia.

Drašković has criticised Aleksandar Vulin, a government minister and president of the Movement of Socialists; she has described him as a fascist and as "Mirjana Marković's commissioner".

== Personal life ==
Her nickname is Dana. By occupation, Drašković is also a journalist and a writer. She received an invalidity pension from 1990 to 2014. She was the owner of Srpska reč (lit. 'Serbian Word') publishing house, through which she wrote columns and published her three books. Srpska reč and her cafe Zmaj were bought in 2024 by Predrag Ranković "Peconi", a businessman closely connected to the ruling Serbian Progressive Party.

=== Family ===
During her studies at the University of Belgrade, she met Drašković, whom she dated until the student demonstrations in 1968. The separation between the two occurred due to Drašković's support for Josip Broz Tito. Their relationship was renewed in 1973; they married on 10 June 1973 and Bošković adopted Drašković's surname. Drašković's brother, Veselin Bošković, was killed during the Ibar Highway assassination attempt.

=== Incidents ===
During the transfer of relics of Nikolaj Velimirović in 1991, she broke a bottle on the head of her interlocutor after a heated discussion. After a SPO gathering in the summer of 1993, Drašković and her husband were beaten and arrested; they were in jail for 38 days. The Chamber of the District Court concluded in 2002 that the government of Serbia had to pay Drašković RSD 1,250,000 due to injuries that she sustained. In 2013, 2019, and 2021, Drašković was involved in traffic accidents.

== Bibliography ==
- Neću da ćutim [I Will Not Be Silent] (in Serbian) (1 ed.). Belgrade: Srpska reč. 2002. ISBN 9788649100466. OCLC 53894554.
- Pisanje u vetar [Writing In the Wind] (in Serbian) (1 ed.). Belgrade: Srpska reč. 2009. ISBN 9788649100619. OCLC 705718676.
- Obešena žena [The Hanged Woman] (in Serbian) (1 ed.). Belgrade: Srpska reč. 2018. ISBN 9788649100879. OCLC 1138948789.
