= State Security Directorate (Serbia) =

Security agency of Serbia (1991-2002)

- Ресор државне безбедности

Secret police overview
- Formed: 13 March 1991
- Preceding Secret police: State Security Service
- Dissolved: 1 August 2002
- Superseding Secret police: Security and Intelligence Agency
- Jurisdiction: Serbia
- Headquarters: Belgrade

The State Security Directorate (Serbian: Ресор државне безбедности, romanized: Resor državne bezbednosti; abbr. РДБ / RDB), or simply State Security (Serbian: Државна безбедност, romanized: Državna bezbednost; abbr. ДБ / DB), was a security agency within the Ministry of Internal Affairs of Serbia tasked with protecting the country from internal threats. Formed in 1991, it was dissolved in 2002 and replaced by the Security and Intelligence Agency (BIA).

== History ==
The State Security Directorate was formed in March 1991 after the dissolution of State Security Service (SDB).

According to the indictment in the series of trials before the International Tribunal for the Former Yugoslavia, the Serbian Special Forces, also known as Serbian Paramilitaries, were secretly established by or with the assistance of the State Security Directorate. Among those were Serb Volunteer Guard (Arkan's Tigers), Special Operations Unit (Red Berets) and Scorpions.

Officially, the Special Operations Unit was incorporated into the State Security Directorate at least since 1996.

On 3 October 1999, a vehicle column of Serbian Renewal Movement, one of largest opposition parties at the time, was attacked while moving down Ibar Highway. Four party officials were killed in the staged accident and party president Vuk Drašković was injured. In a 2007 ruling by the Belgrade District Court former State Security officer and unit's commander Milorad Ulemek, was sentenced to 15 years in prison, former Head of the State Security Directorate Radomir Marković received eight years while other members of the unit were sentenced to 14 years in prison.

On 25 August 2000, former president of Serbia and once a rival of Slobodan Milošević, Ivan Stambolić, was detained by the police. Soon after, he was gone missing during his every-day jogging routine. His remains were uncovered in 2003, in Fruška Gora. After a yearlong trial in special court in Belgrade, a judge found Radomir Marković and Milorad Ulemek, guilty of planning and carrying out the assassination of Ivan Stambolić.

The RDB was dissolved and replaced with Security and Intelligence Agency on 1 August 2002.

== Heads ==
Name	Tenure
Jovica Stanišić	1991–1998
Radomir Marković	1998–2001 (Note: Resigned in the aftermath of the overthrow of Slobodan Milošević.)
Goran Petrović	2001 (Note: Dismissed in the aftermath of the JSO mutiny.)
Andreja Savić	2001–2002

== See also ==
- State Security Service
- Security and Intelligence Agency
