= Progressive Club =

Serbian nongovernmental organization

The Progressive Club (Serbian: Напредни клуб / Napredni klub) is a non-governmental organization in Serbia. It was founded in 2007 by Dr. Čedomir Antić. According to its Statute the organization promotes the modernization and reformation of the Serbian state, his politics, economy and the culture. The Progressive Club considers itself as conservative movement in tradition of the Serbian Progressive Party from 1906.
