= Miroljub Labus =

Serbian politician and economist

- Мирољуб Лабус
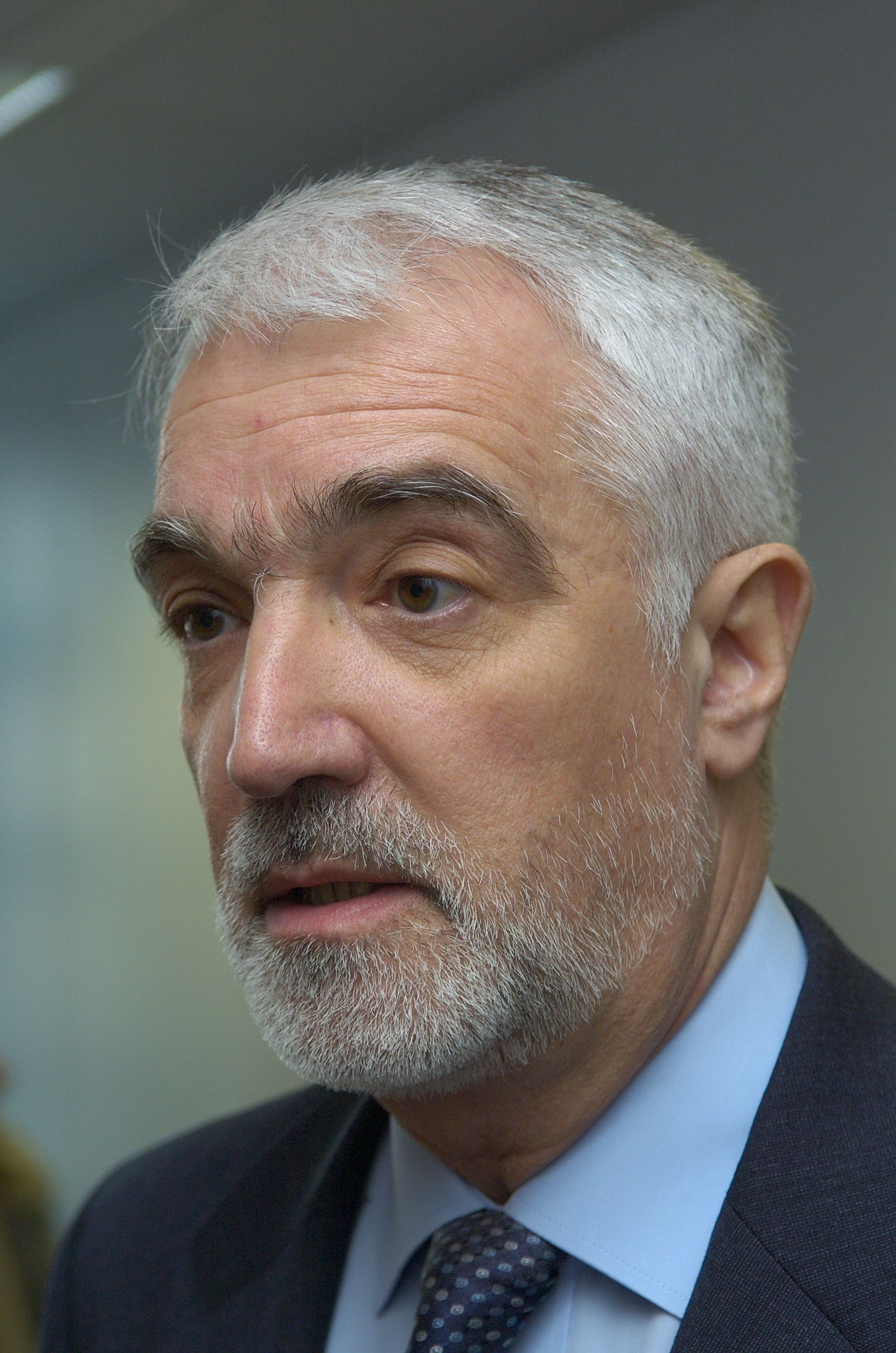
- Labus in 2004

Deputy Prime Minister of Serbia
- In office 3 March 2004 – 3 May 2006
- Prime Minister: Vojislav Koštunica
- Preceded by: Nebojša Čović; Žarko Korać; Dušan Mihajlović; Jožef Kasa; Miodrag Isakov; Čedomir Jovanović
- Succeeded by: Ivana Dulić-Marković

Deputy Prime Minister of FR Yugoslavia
- In office 4 November 2000 – 17 March 2003
- Prime Minister: Dragiša Pešić
- Preceded by: Vladan Kutlešić; Zoran Lilić; Danilo Vuksanović; Jovan Zebić; Maja Gojković; Tomislav Nikolić
- Succeeded by: position abolished

Personal details
- Born: 28 February 1947 (age 79) Mala Krsna, PR Serbia, FPR Yugoslavia
- Party: G17 Plus (2002–2006); Democratic Party (1990–1997)
- Education: University of Belgrade
- Profession: Economist

Miroljub Labus (Serbian Cyrillic: Мирољуб Лабус; born 28 February 1947) is a Serbian economist and former politician. He is a retired University of Belgrade professor, who lectured political economy at the University of Belgrade Faculty of Law. He is also the owner of consulting firm Belox Advisory Service.

Labus was the Deputy Prime Minister of Serbia from March 2004, serving under PM Vojislav Koštunica. He resigned on May 3, 2006, after EU suspended enlargement talks with Serbia over Ratko Mladić. Labus also resigned from the position of President of G17 Plus.

== Early life and education ==
Labus was born in Mala Krsna, near Smederevo, PR Serbia, FPR Yugoslavia. He graduated from law school in 1970 from the University of Belgrade Faculty of Law. This was followed by two postgraduate qualifications in economics.

== Academic and administrative career ==
Labus began his career in academia as a university professor. In 1983, he was a Fulbright fellow at Cornell University.

Labus was a senior adviser at the Federal Statistics Bureau (Savezni zavod za statistiku) in Belgrade between 1986 and 1994. Since 1993, he has been a researcher at Belgrade's Economics Institute. He edited the Federal Bureau of Statistics's Economic Trend publication from 1990 to 1996, and the Belgrade Economics Institute's Economic Barometer from 1994 to 2000. Labus has also been involved with the National Bank of Yugoslavia in Serbia and Montenegro and the World Bank.

== Political career ==
Already politically involved as a macroeconomic policy adviser to SFR Yugoslavia's federal government, he joined the recently established Democratic Party (DS) in 1990.

=== Democratic Party ===
In 1992, Labus was elected as MP to the FR Yugoslavia's federal parliament. While in this role, he was also a member of the parliamentary Monetary Policy Committee. In 1994, he was promoted to Vice-President of the Democratic Party under Zoran Đinđić. He held this position until 1997.

=== G17 Plus ===
In 1999, Labus became President of the Administrative Board of the G17 Plus movement. At this time, the G17 Plus movement was a lobby group focused on encouraging economic reforms within Serbia. G17 Plus soon become powerful, with significant public support. In 2000, he left the board of G17 Plus, taking up a position as Deputy Prime Minister of FR Yugoslavia and Minister for International Economic Relations (in the federal government following the overthrow of Slobodan Milošević).

Leading up to the 2002 Serbian presidential elections, it was apparent that the current Serbian Prime Minister, Zoran Đinđić, did not have the appeal to match Koštunica, another candidate. Đinđić agreed to back Koštunica's former ally, Labus, as an alternative candidate. In the resulting election, Koštunica defeated Labus. However, the election did not gain the required 50% voter turnout and the results were declared void. Labus continued on in his position for another year.

Labus continued working with G17 Plus and, in late 2002, he began transforming the lobby group into a full-fledged centrist political party, becoming its President. After the elections of December 2003, Labus and his party formed a minority coalition with the Democratic Party of Serbia and several other minor parties, in order to keep ultra-nationalist Tomislav Nikolić out of power. As a result, he retained his current positions. In 2006, Labus resigned from the position of President of G17 Plus party.

== Books ==
- Fundamentals of Economics, (1995, 1997) (Original: Osnovi ekonomije)
- Fundamentals of Political Economy, (with D. Šoškić) (1992) (Original: Osnovi političke ekonomije)
- Contemporary Political Economy (1990) (Original: Savremena politička ekonomija)
- General Equilibrium of Economy, (with D. Vujović) (1990) (Original: Opšta privredna ravnoteža)
- Social or Collective Ownership Rights (1987) (Original: Društvena ili kolektivna vlasnička prava)
