= Deputy Prime Minister of Serbia and Montenegro =

- Final holder: Miroljub Labus
- Abolished: 17 March 2003

The Prime Minister of the Federal Republic of Yugoslavia had a deputy. Thus, the post existed from 1992 until 2003.

The office of the Deputy Prime Minister of FR Yugoslavia was abolished with the constitutional reforms of 2003. Therefore, the last Deputy Prime Minister was Miroljub Labus, who served from 4 November 2000 to 17 March 2003.

== List of Deputy Prime Ministers ==
| Picture | Name (Birth–Death) | Term of Office | | Political Party |
|---|---|---|---|---|
| | Oskar Kovač (1937–) | 14 July 1992 | 30 November 1992 | Socialist Party of Serbia |
| | Radoje Kontić (1937–) | 14 July 1992 | 7 February 1993 | Democratic Party of Socialists of Montenegro |
| | Jovan Zebić (1939–2007) | 2 March 1993 | 20 March 1997 | Socialist Party of Serbia |
| | Asim Telaćević (1939–) | 2 March 1993 | 15 September 1994 | Democratic Party of Socialists of Montenegro |
| | Vladislav Jovanović (1933–) | 2 March 1993 | 6 July 1993 | Socialist Party of Serbia |
| | Željko Simić (1958–) | 6 July 1993 | 15 September 1994 | Socialist Party of Serbia |
| | Nikola Šainović (1948–) | 22 February 1994 | 4 November 2000 | Socialist Party of Serbia |
| | Uroš Klikovac (1935–2004) | 15 September 1994 | 20 March 1997 | Democratic Party of Socialists of Montenegro |
| | Vojin Đukanović (1942–) | 20 March 1997 | 19 May 1998 | Democratic Party of Socialists of Montenegro |
| | Danko Đunić (1949–) | 20 March 1997 | 19 May 1998 | Independent |
| | Vladan Kutlešić (1955–) | 20 March 1997 | 4 November 2000 | Socialist Party of Serbia |
| | Zoran Lilić (1953–) | 11 November 1997 | 4 November 2000 | Socialist Party of Serbia |
| | Danilo Vuksanović (1946–) | 19 May 1998 | 4 November 2000 | Socialist People's Party of Montenegro |
| | Jovan Zebić (1939–2007) | 19 May 1998 | 4 November 2000 | Socialist Party of Serbia |
| | Vuk Drašković (1946–) | 18 January 1998 | 28 April 1999 | Serbian Renewal Movement |
| | Maja Gojković (1963–) | 12 August 1999 | 4 November 2000 | Serbian Radical Party |
| | Tomislav Nikolić (1952–) | 12 August 1999 | 4 November 2000 | Serbian Radical Party |
| | Miroljub Labus (1947–) | 4 November 2000 | 17 March 2003 | G17 Plus |

== See also ==
- Prime Minister of Serbia and Montenegro
- Deputy Prime Minister of Yugoslavia
