= Ibar Highway assassination attempt =

1999 attempted murder in Serbia

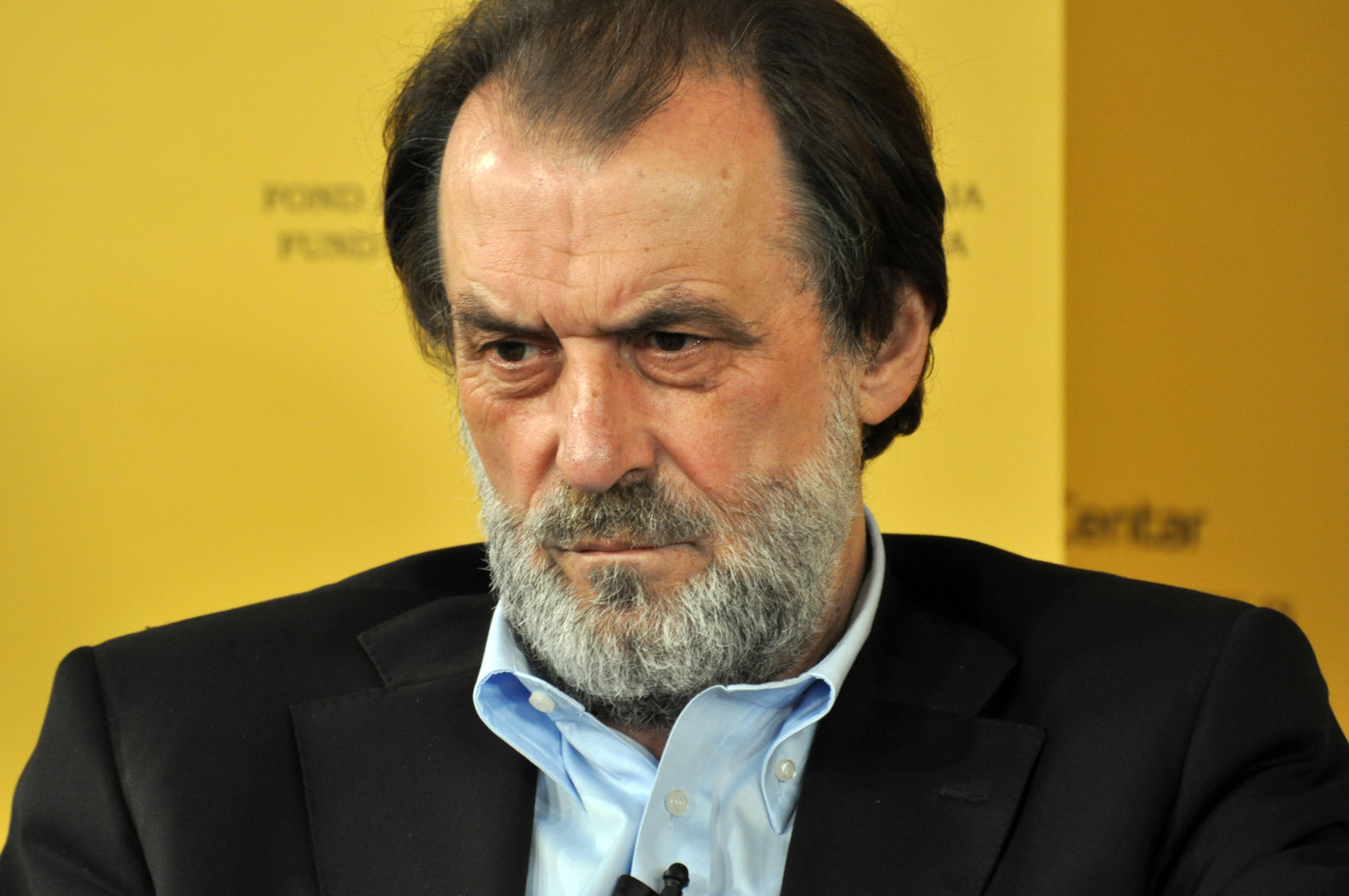
- Vuk Drašković was the planned target of the assassination
- Location: near the village of Petka, near Lazarevac, Serbia, FR Yugoslavia
- Date: 3 October 1999; 12:15 PM (Central European Time)
- Target: Vuk Drašković
- Deaths: 4
- Injuries: 1 (Drašković)
- Perpetrator: Special Operations Unit (JSO)

The Ibar highway assassination attempt refers to the events that occurred on the Ibar Highway in Serbia, a federal unit of FR Yugoslavia on 3 October 1999, when active members of the Yugoslav state security's Special Operations Unit (JSO) attempted to murder politician Vuk Drašković on the Ibar Highway by slamming a truck full of sand into his two-car motorcade. Their intention was to make it appear as though it were a traffic accident.

Instead of killing Drašković, who managed to survive the crash, they ended up killing four of his associates: high-ranking Serbian Renewal Movement member Veselin Bošković (who was also Drašković's brother-in-law), along with three bodyguards (Zvonko Osmajlić, Vučko Rakočević, and Dragan Vušurović).

== Event ==
On Sunday, 3 October 1999, in the early afternoon hours, Vuk Drašković and his entourage were traveling in three cars southbound on the Ibar Highway. The trip began in front of Drašković's house in Belgrade and the destination was Ravna Gora.

The original plan was to travel in two cars with Drašković, his wife Danica Drašković, SPO federal MP Gordana Aničić, and Drašković's personal driver Bane in the jeep followed by the three bodyguards in the black BMW 520 right behind. However, immediately before setting off, Veselin Bošković, Drašković's brother-in-law, showed up in his Audi 8 in front of the house and joined the group. He also requested that Vuk Drašković come over to his car, so they can ride together, which Drašković did.

Thus, the modified driving arrangement was: a jeep with Danica, Gordana, and driver Bane first, followed by the Audi with Bošković and Drašković inside it, and finally the three bodyguards Osmajlić, Rakočević, and Vušurović in the BMW just behind. Bošković was driving cautiously, and quickly gave up trying to keep up with the jeep driven by Bane that pulled way ahead and out of sight. The bodyguards in the BMW were right behind Bošković and Drašković, throughout.

Around fifteen minutes past noon, as the two cars were driving down the Ibar Highway through the municipal territory of the village of Petka near Lazarevac, a huge crash occurred. A green-coloured truck traveling in the opposite direction, toward Belgrade, abruptly swerved left into oncoming traffic five meters before the two cars, plowing into and over them. It hit the first car (an Audi) on the driver's side, bouncing it into the corn field, and then slammed into the second car (a BMW) with full force. The BMW went underneath the truck and exploded, incinerating the three people inside it.

== Reaction ==
Initially reported in Sunday bulletins as a traffic accident with four casualties, it soon became clear that there was much more to the crash. The very next day, on Monday, Drašković himself called it a "clear attempt on my life". He accused the authorities of 'state terrorism'.

Other political factors in Serbia at the time also reacted on the same day. The opposition coalition Alliance for Changes (SZP) called on the Serbian police authorities to "investigate every single detail of the crash". Speaking as a SZP representative, Democratic Party president Zoran Đinđić said that the traffic accident near Lazarevac looked suspicious. He also relayed his expectation about the authorities "providing an immediate and convincing explanation of the event because if that doesn't happen, there will be suspicions that something abnormal occurred". Democratic Party of Serbia (DSS) vice president Milorad Jovanović said that "it's too early to discuss the reasons for this tragedy since the police didn't yet provide all the information". The release by the New Democracy political party was the strongest: it clearly referred to the event as an "assassination attempt on Drašković" and strongly condemned it.

On 5 October, Veselin Bošković was buried at Topčider cemetery in Belgrade. Many opposition leaders came to the funeral, however no one from the ruling coalition showed up. Eulogizing his brother-in-law, Drašković gave an impassioned speech:

May those evil people be damned, those lucifers who've been building their own happiness for the last 10 years on the misery and sorrow of others. They've killed so much humanity, they've taken so much blood, they've destroyed countries, they've been producing only hatred - for how much longer? And, God, to you I pose a question: why do you let the worst kill our best. If it's because the foundation of a new Serbia needs to have the best laid into it - then I say to you - you've already taken too many of the good ones, don't let the evil ones kill the good ones any longer, enough of the good ones have already been laid into the foundation.

On the following day on 6 October, Zvonko Osmajlić, Vučko Rakočević, and Dragan Vušurović were being laid to rest at the same cemetery, and Drašković delivered another impassioned eulogy:

All of those who killed these individuals will pay with their heads. That will not be revenge, but justice. The majority of citizens, not just SPO, have had it with the empire of evil that has torn down everything that we built up since Karađorđe, onwards. That empire will be torn down.

== Trial (2002–03) ==
The trial started with four individuals on the indictment list: Nenad Bujošević, Nenad Ilić, Radomir Marković, and Milan Radonjić.

The verdict in what turned out to be only the first trial (presided by judge Miroslav Cvetković) was delivered on 30 January 2003. The immediate assassins Nenad Bujošević and Nenad Ilić were sentenced to 15 years in prison each, State Security chief Radomir Marković received 7 years, while State Security Belgrade Branch chief Milan Radonjić was found not guilty of all charges. The Supreme Court above verdict was subsequently annulled before the Supreme Court and a retrial was ordered.

== Retrial (2005) ==
The re-trial, which consisted of an expanded indictment list that now also included 8 more individuals (Milorad Ulemek, Mihalj Kertes, Branko Đurić, Dragiša Dinić, Vidan Mijailović, and 3 more JSO members), wrapped up on 29 June 2005 in the Belgrade District Court. It resulted in first degree sentences for the following individuals:

- Milorad Ulemek (a former JSO commander), received 15 years for taking part in the assassination attempt.
- five other JSO members (Nenad Ilić, Nenad Bujošević, Duško Maričić, Branko Berček, and Leonid Milivojević) also received 15 years each for taking part in the assassination attempt.
- Radomir Marković (the former Serbian State Security Directorate chief), received 10 years for helping those that directly carried out the crime by aiding them after they committed it. He was also indicted with a much more serious charge of organizing the assassination attempt, but the court found him not guilty of that.
- Mihalj Kertes (the former Federal Customs director), received 3 years also for aiding the immediate executioners of the assassination attempt after the crime was committed.
- Dragiša Dinić (former chief of Serbian Interior Ministry traffic police), received 2 years.
- Vidan Mijailović (member of Serbian Interior Ministry traffic police), received 1 year.

The remaining two individuals on the indictment list were absolved of any responsibility: Milan Radonjić (the former State Security's Belgrade Branch chief) and Branko Đurić (the former Police Chief in Belgrade).

The sentence was made official on 23 November 2005, almost 5 months after it was delivered, because presiding judge Bojan Mišić took an unusually long amount of time to write it up. This led to veiled public accusations of time wasting with the intent of sabotaging the appeals process which has a 1-year window from the date of the verdict being delivered, but can only start once the verdict is official. By taking almost 5 months to make the verdict official, judge Mišić effectively made that time period unavailable for appeals, leaving only 7 months for the appeals instead of a full year.

=== Supreme Court appeals ===
Everyone involved with the case (public prosecutor, lawyers, and the accused) appealed the verdict, and the case went before the Supreme Court again between 27 March and 31 March 2006. The Supreme Court's 5-judge council had three options in regards to the district court verdict: upholding the verdict, modifying the verdict, or ordering a partial/full re-trial by partially/fully annulling the verdict.

On 16 May 2006, the Supreme Court made its decision public - it fully annulled the verdict and ordered a full re-trial for the second time. The prison detentions for all of the accused were extended.

== Third trial (2006–07) ==
The third trial, again under the presiding judge Bojan Mišić, ended on 14 February 2007. The verdict was delivered on 16 February, 2007. It resulted in the following sentences:

- Milorad Ulemek (former JSO commander), received 15 years for taking part in the assassination attempt.
- Nenad Ilić, JSO member and the driver of the truck also received 15 years.
- 4 other JSO members (Nenad Bujošević, Duško Maričić, Branko Berček, and Leonid Milivojević) all received 14 years each for taking part in the assassination respectfully.
- Radomir Marković (former Serbian State Security Service chief), received 10 years for helping those that directly carried out the crime by aiding them after they committed it.
- Mihalj Kertes (former Federal Customs director), received 2 and a half years for aiding the immediate executioners of the assassination attempt after the crime was committed.
- Dragiša Dinić (former chief of Serbian Interior Ministry traffic police), received 19 months.
- Vidan Mijailović (member of Serbian Interior Ministry traffic police), received 9 months.

The remaining two individuals on the indictment list were again absolved of responsibility: Milan Radonjić (former State Security's Belgrade branch chief) and Branko Đurić (former Police Chief in Belgrade). On appeal, the Supreme Court made a decision that the case should be again be re-tried in front of the Supreme Court rather than sending it back to the District Court.

== Fourth trial (2008) ==
On 3 March 2008, the fourth trial in the Ibar Highway case opened - this time in front of the Serbian Supreme Court's five-person council, which was presided over by judge Dragomir Milojević. According to the presiding judge the case was to be heard again from beginning to end with old evidence as well as new evidence that surfaced in the meantime.

On 19 June 2008, the Supreme Court delivered a verdict sentencing Rade Marković, Milorad Ulemek, Branko Berček, and Nenad Ilić to 40 years for the murder of 4 men and the attempted murder of Vuk Drašković. Nenad Bujošević was sentenced to 35 years for the same crime, while Duško Maričić and Leonid Milivojević got 30 years.

Furthermore, the Supreme Court gave out sentences for hiding the evidence: Mihalj Kertes - 18 months, Dragiša Dinić - 10 months, and Vidan Mijailović - 6 months. Branko Đurić and Milan Radonjić were once again absolved of responsibility due to lack of any evidence against them.

This sentence was final for Kertes, Mijailović, and Dinić while all others had a right to appeal it and did so. The supreme court met in late October 2009 to discuss their appeals. On 21 December 2009, the appeal verdict was announced and it confirmed all of the sentences for all accused, meaning that their sentences now became final.
