= Petka, Lazarevac =

Coordinates: 44.3736°N 20.2317°E

Petka
- Village
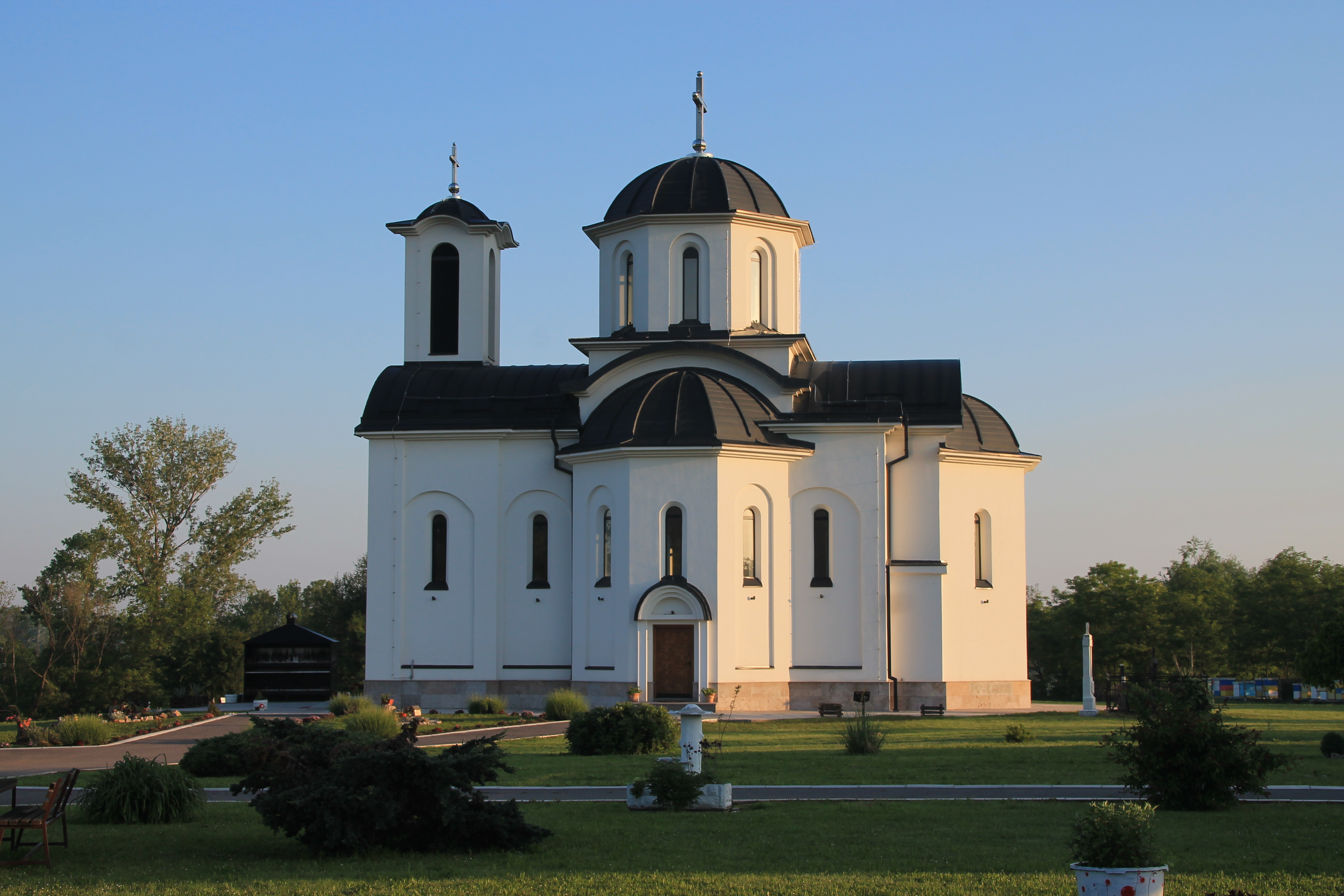
- Church in Petka
- Interactive map of Petka
- Country: Serbia
- Municipality: Lazarevac

Area
  - Total: 7.56 km^{2} (2.92 sq mi)
- Elevation: 155 m (509 ft)

Population (2011)
  - Total: 1,422
  - Density: 188/km^{2} (487/sq mi)
- Time zone: UTC+1 (CET)
  - Summer (DST): UTC+2 (CEST)

Petka is a village situated in Lazarevac municipality in Serbia.
