= Mala Krsna =

Mala Krsna Мала Крсна
- Village (Selo)
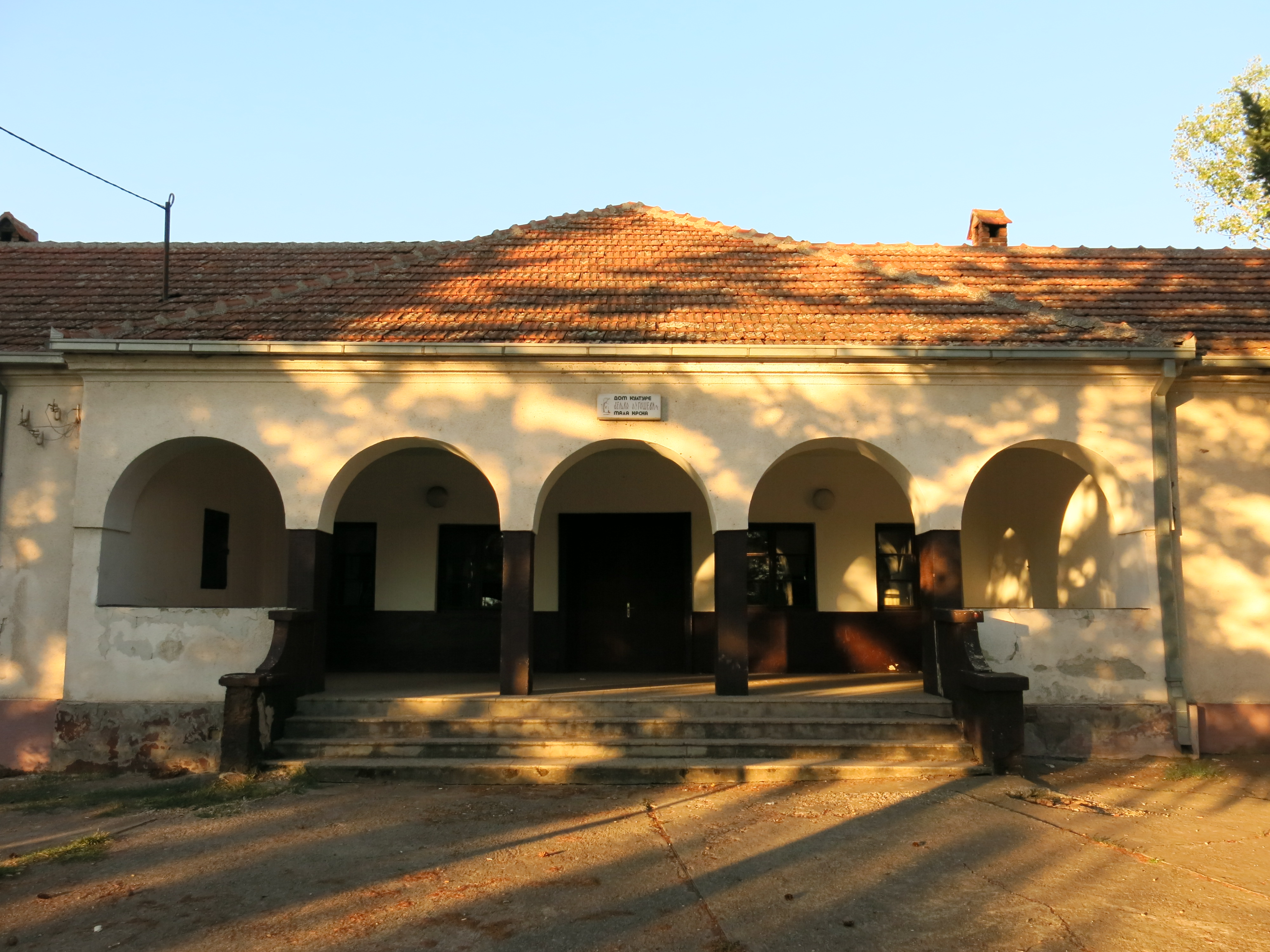
- Cultural center Veljko Dugošević

- Location of Mala Krsna within Serbia
- Coordinates: 44°35′N 21°2′E
- Country: Serbia
- District: Podunavlje
- Municipality: Smederevo

Area
  - Total: 12.80 km^{2} (4.94 sq mi)
- Elevation: 73 m (240 ft)

Population (2022 census)
  - Total: 1,550
  - Density: 121/km^{2} (314/sq mi)
- Time zone: UTC+1 (CET)
  - Summer (DST): UTC+2 (CEST)
- Postal code: 11313
- Area code: +381(0)26
- Car plates: SD

Mala Krsna (Serbian Cyrillic: Мала Крсна) is a village located in the city of Smederevo, Serbia. As of 2011 census, it has a population of 1,552 inhabitants.

It is said to be the second-largest railroad junction in Serbia.
