= Zoran Ćirjaković =

Serbian journalist and former professor

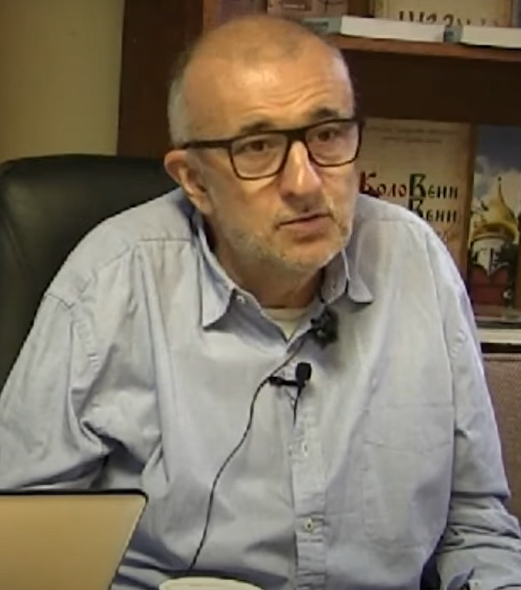
- Ćirjaković in 2021
- Born: 22 December 1965 (age 60); Belgrade, SR Serbia, SFR Yugoslavia
- Education: University of Belgrade Faculty of Electrical Engineering
- Occupations: Journalist, publicist, university lecturer, academic researcher

Zoran Ćirjaković (Serbian Cyrillic: Зоран Ћирјаковић; born 22 December 1965) is a Serbian journalist, author, academic researcher, world traveler and former university lecturer. He is a former correspondent for Newsweek and the Los Angeles Times, as well as a lecturer at the Faculty of Media and Communication of Singidunum University.

== Biography ==
He is from a pre-war communist family from the region of Dragačevo. His grandfather-uncle was the political commissar of the Dragačevo Partisan Company. Ćirjaković's father was a police inspector for economic crime, and his mother was a doctor originally from the village of Zaskok in Kosovo, which today is part of Uroševac.

He mostly spent his childhood in Kosjerić, where his parents worked, and he completed the first four grades of elementary school at the "Nada Matić" Elementary School in Užice. The family then moved to Block 45 in New Belgrade, and Ćirjaković finished the "Branko Radičević" Elementary School there. He learned English at an early age, because already after the 7th grade he went to a British family in Brighton to learn the language. After finishing high school at the "Petar Drapšin" Educational Center, he enrolled in sociology and electrical engineering studies, but opted for the latter. He went to serve his military service in Pula, and then continues his studies. He graduated from the Electrical Engineering Faculty of the University of Belgrade. During his studies, he completed general and specialist training for a tourist guide at the tourism department of the Faculty of Economics and worked as a guide in Belgrade and in Western Europe. He completed his postgraduate (master's degree) studies at the Faculty of Political Sciences, University of Belgrade.

In June 1993, he got a job as an electrical engineer at the Federal Customs Administration in Vračar, and after only a few weeks he started working as a fixer (driver and translator) for foreign correspondents from the Yugoslav battlefields. Ćirjaković was later a war correspondent himself, and he published articles for Newsweek and the Los Angeles Times. He wrote about events and crimes in the war in Bosnia and Herzegovina and the war in Kosovo and Metohija. He later continues to report on war conflicts and crises from sub-Saharan Africa, Asia and Latin America. He stayed in many crisis areas, including certain bases controlled by Hamas.

He published articles in the newspaper Danas, and wrote for NIN, Politika and Vreme. Since 2009, he has been publishing his texts on his blog Неписме "Nepismeni diavolji advokat" (Illiterate devil's advocate).

He worked as a lecturer at the Faculty of Media and Communication, Singidunum University. He taught a number of courses and summer schools in the field of globalization at the Faculty of Political Sciences of the University of Belgrade. As a guest lecturer, he lectured at faculties in Bosnia and Herzegovina and the United Kingdom, and collaborated with the Human Rights Watch organization.

His specialized topics are alternative modernities, Sub-Saharan Africa and intercultural communication.

According to Biljana Srbljanović (and Ćirjaković himself), he is one of the first people in Serbia who experienced cancellation, after a sharp conflict of opinion with a group of women influential in the Serbian public life.

Ćirjaković invented two terms which have caused debates in Serbia and the region: autochauvinism (a term simial to self-hating Jew) and coincidental Serb.

He is married to Serbian actress Nataša Marković.

== Works ==
=== Books ===
- Globalna Afrika: posledice globalizacijskih i modernizacijskih procesa južno od Sahare, Arhipelag, 2013, ISBN 978-86-523-0088-4;
- Otkrivanje autošovinizma: od pojave do pojma, Catena Mundi, 2021, ISBN 978-86-6343-148-5
- Neokolonijalna Srbija: država i društvo u vreme Aleksandra Vučića, Filip Višnjić, 2022, ISBN 978-86-6309-270-9.
- Protiv doma spremni: srpski autošovinizam, njegovi koreni i posledice, Pešić i Sinovi, 2024, ISBN 978-86-7540-397-5.

=== Selected scientific works and other publications ===
- 'Kosovized' Bosnia
- Islamski fundamentalizam: ključ budućnosti Bosne
- “Serbian autumn” delayed: a lesson in uncivil democracy-building
- Svođenje postjugoslovenskih država i njihovog stanovništva na „pravu meru”
- Drugi život javnih intelektualaca: televizijski intelektualci u eri društvenih medija
- Muški snovi, neoliberalne fantazije i zvuk oklevetane modernosti: turbo-folk u raljama subalternosti, preduzetništva drugosti i zločina
- Subalterne studije i tumačenje postjugoslovenskog prostora
- Primena modela dimenzija nacionalnih kultura Herta Hofštedea u istraživanju političkog obrasca u Srbiji: postoji li softver srpskog političkog uma?
- Globalna Afrika: posledice globalizacijskih i modernizacijskih procesa južno od Sahare
- Uloga društvenih medija u izborima u Srbiji 2014. Godine: sve značajniji, ali i dalje sekundarni
- Normativno nasilje u eri globalizacije
- Društveni mediji kao oružje slabih u defektnoj demokratiji: bitke za cenzus, otpor razočaranih i homonacionalističko povlačenje na izborima u Srbiji 2016. Godine
- Decentriranje sveta posle kolonijalizma: strategije suprotstavljanja od kraha civilizatorske misije do uspona novog orijentalizma
- Afričke nevolje s Nobelovom nagradom za mir: „perverzni nobel“ u Hagu umesto puta u Oslo
- Beli šum na društvenim mrežama: uloga društvenog kapitala u izbornim kampanjama
- Liminalni prostor kao tera inkognita: ni debalkanizacija ni evropeizacija
- Značaj kulturalnosti diskursa za razumevanje globalizacije „univerzalnih“ političkih normi
- Decentriranje shvatanja levice i pogled na levicu u Srbiji kroz latinoameričku prizmu
- U slavu hibrida, estetizacije i obmana: subverzija istorije, zapadnog pogleda i afrocentričnosti u radovima Jinke Šonibarea
- Transitional justice against democracy in Serbia: Aiding transitions or facilitating neocolonial interventions
- ANTI-WAR ACTIVISM AS VANISHING MEDIATOR OF AUTOCHAUVINISM: FROM SOCIALIST YUGOSLAVISM TO SERBIA THAT DOES NOT RECONCILE ITSELF TO THE SERBS AND SERBIA
- Otkud autošovinizam: Od socijalističkog jugoslovenstva do Srbije koja se ne miri sa Srbima
