= Vuk Drašković =

Serbian writer and politician

- Вук Драшковић
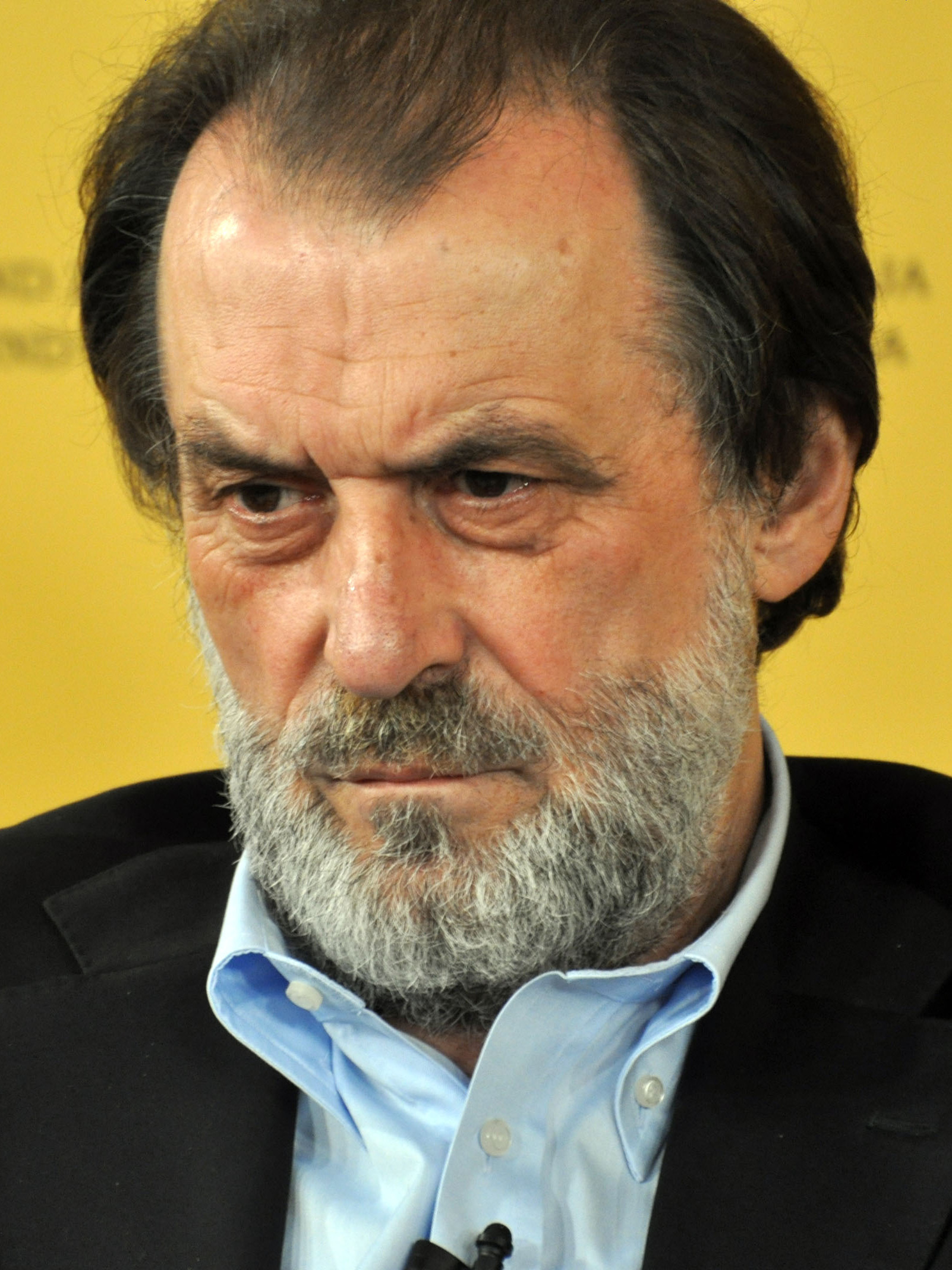
- Drašković in 2010

Minister of Foreign Affairs of Serbia
- In office 5 June 2006 – 16 May 2007
- Prime Minister: Vojislav Koštunica
- Preceded by: Position established
- Succeeded by: Vuk Jeremić

Minister of Foreign Affairs of Serbia and Montenegro
- In office 3 March 2004 – 5 June 2006
- Prime Minister: Svetozar Marović
- Preceded by: Goran Svilanović
- Succeeded by: Position abolished

Deputy Prime Minister of the Federal Republic of Yugoslavia
- In office 18 January 1999 – 28 April 1999
- Prime Minister: Momir Bulatović

Personal details
- Born: 29 November 1946 (age 79) Međa, PR Serbia, Yugoslavia
- Party: SKJ (until 1982); SNO (1990); SPO (1990–present)
- Spouse: Danica Drašković (m. 1973)
- Education: LLB of Univ. of Belgrade Fac. of Law
- Occupation: Politician
- Profession: Writer

Vuk Drašković (Serbian Cyrillic: Вук Драшковић, pronounced [ʋûːk drâʃkoʋitɕ]; born 29 November 1946) is a Serbian writer and politician.

He graduated from the University of Belgrade Faculty of Law in 1968. From 1969 to 1980, he worked as a journalist in the Yugoslav news agency Tanjug. He was a member of the League of Communists of Yugoslavia and worked as the chief of staff of the Yugoslav President Mika Špiljak. He is the co-founder and former leader of the Serbian Renewal Movement, serving as president from 1990 to 2024. He also served as the Deputy Prime Minister of the Federal Republic of Yugoslavia in 1999 during Kosovo War and the rule of Slobodan Milošević. He was later the Minister of Foreign Affairs of both Serbia and Montenegro and Serbia from 2004 to 2007.

Drašković is also a prolific writer and has published 23 books.

== Early life and career ==
Drašković was born in the small village of Medja in the Banat region to a family of settlers from Herzegovina. He was three months old when his mother, Stoja Nikitović, died.

His father, Vidak, remarried and had two more sons - Rodoljub and Dragan; and three daughters - Radmila, Tanja and Ljiljana with Dara Drašković, meaning that young Vuk grew up with five half-siblings.

Shortly after Vuk's birth, the entire family went back to Herzegovina where he finished primary school in the village of Slivlje. He graduated high school in Gacko.

At his father's insistence, Drašković considered studying medicine in Sarajevo; however, the city was too "uptight and cramped" for his liking, so he went to study law in Belgrade instead.

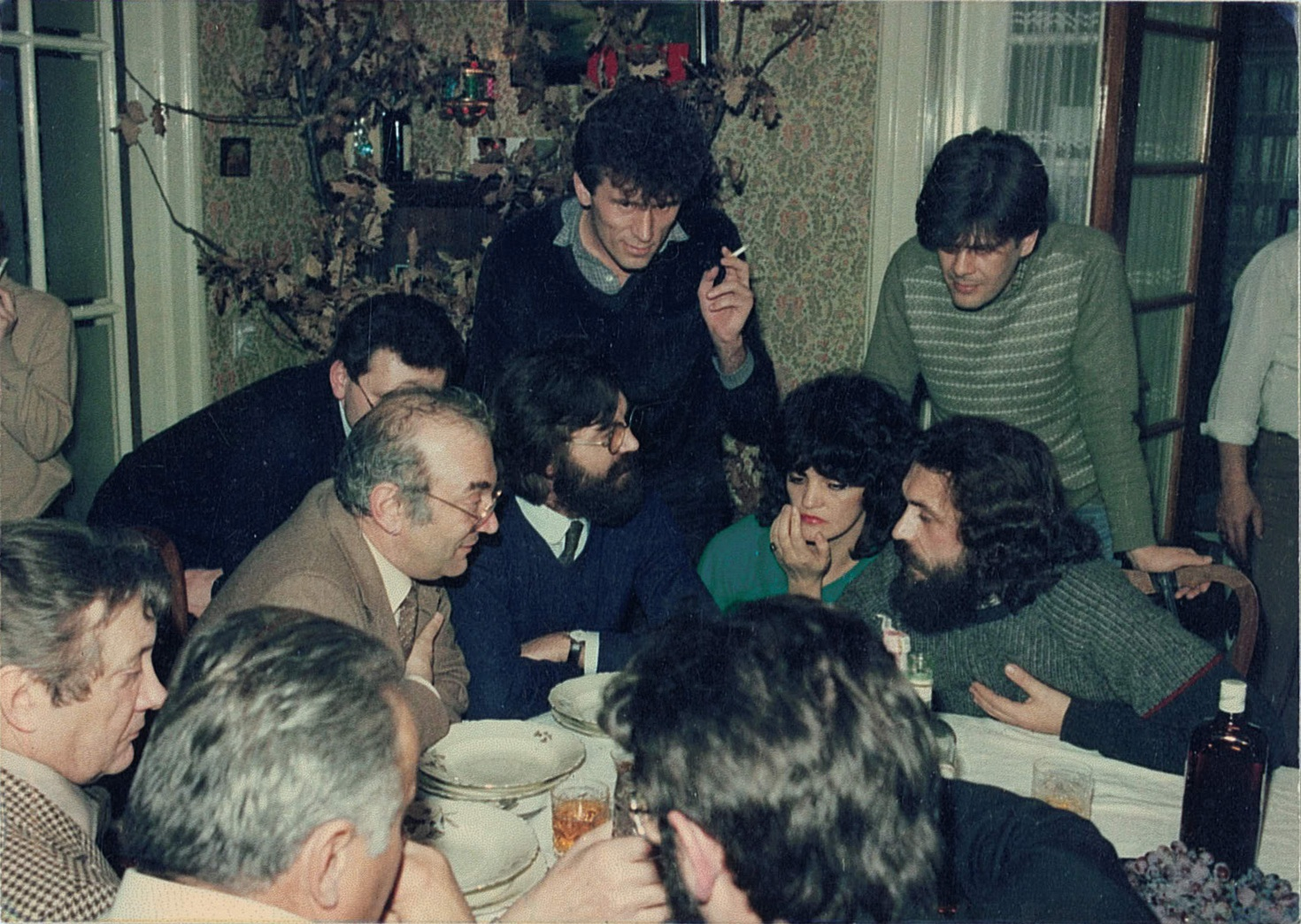
Drašković with his wife, Danica, and Soviet-turned-Swiss chess grandmaster Viktor Korchnoi during an Orthodox Christmas eve party in January 1984 at Villa Dragoslava, a villa in the Belgrade neighbourhood of Banovo Brdo that often served as meeting point for individuals critical of SFR Yugoslavia's system of governance as well as communism and socialism in general.

In 1968, Drašković participated in anti-bureaucratic student revolts in Yugoslavia. After Josip Broz Tito promised reforms, Drašković initiated people to dance the Kozaračko kolo at the Faculty of Law. Drašković was a member of the Communist Youth Organization and later joined the League of Communists of Yugoslavia.

Between 1969 and 1978, he was involved with journalism. He first worked for the state news agency Tanjug as its African correspondent stationed in Lusaka, Zambia. He was discharged from his post after publishing misleading information regarding the Rhodesian Bush War, creating a diplomatic incident.

He then took a job as press adviser to the Yugoslav Union of Trade Unions (Savez Sindikata Jugoslavije) and then became editor-in-chief of Rad, a trade union paper. During his time as press adviser, Drašković spent some time as the personal secretary to the organisation's president Mika Špiljak.

In 1981, Drašković published his first novel Sudije (Judges) which described a judge resisting political pressure.

In 1982, Drašković was expelled from the Communist party after he published his second novel Nož (Knife). The novel tells the story of a man who is raised as a Bosnian Muslim who comes to believe that Serbs killed his family, only to later learn that his ethnic heritage is Serbian and that his adoptive family was guilty of murdering his birth-family. The book caused controversy as it reignited divisive ethno-nationalist issues which Tito and the Communist Party tried to suppress. The party condemned and subsequently banned the book, which was also published in English. The book was made into a movie in 1999 entitled The Dagger or The Knife in English.

His novels Molitva 1–2 (Prayer 1–2, 1985) and Ruski konsul (Russian consul, 1988) also explored the suffering of Serbs during World War II, while Noć đenerala (The General's Nights) published in 1994 dealt with Draža Mihailović's last days.

== Political career ==
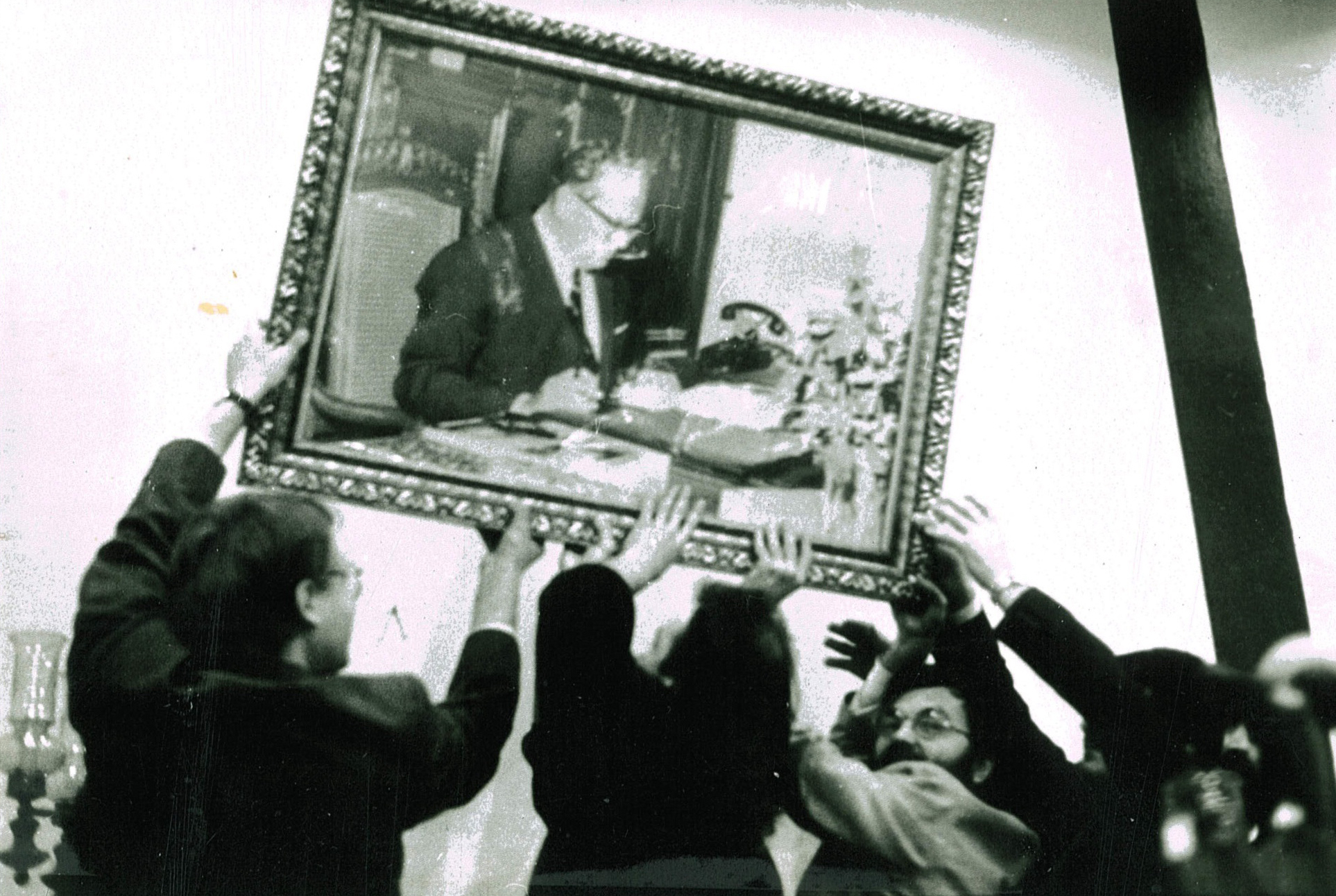
Drašković with Šešelj, in 1990, removing picture of Josip Broz Tito from Belgrade Center of engineers and electricians.

In March 1989, Drašković along with Mirko Jović and Vojislav Šešelj founded the Sava Association. The group dedicated itself to the protection of the Serbian language and the defense of Kosovo and Metohija. In the late 1980s, Drašković was in agreement with Šešelj's sentiments about deporting Albanians from Kosovo and suggested that "a special fund" was needed "to finance the repopulation of Kosovo by Serbs". However, Jović, Šešelj and Drašković disagreed with each other and their party split into three. The Sava Association became the Serbian National Renewal Party under the leadership of Jović in January 1990. Drašković founded the Serbian Renewal Movement (Srpski Pokret Obnove, SPO, a democratic nationalist party) in March, and then in February 1991 Šešelj created his Serbian Radical Party.

On 26 September 1990, Drašković declared that his armed "volunteers" would be willing to defend Krajina Serbs, and three days later in an interview with Delo, Drašković stated: "Serbia must obtain all territories in what is today Herzegovina, Bosnia, Slavonia, Dalmatia, in these parts of Croatia where the Serbs made a majority of the population until 6 April 1941, when the Ustasha genocide against them began...Wherever the Serb blood was shed by the Ustashas knives, wherever there are our graves there are our borders". He also claimed that most Bosnian Muslims are "burdened with Serbian origin" and that "they run away from themselves because they know that they are Orthodox and Serbs". The Serbian Renewal Movement (SPO) participated in the first post-communist democratic elections, held on 9 December 1990, but finished a distant second amidst the total blackout from the pro-Milošević state media. Following that failure Drašković kept pressure on Serbian President Slobodan Milošević via street protests, organizing mass demonstrations in Belgrade on 9 March 1991. The police intervened, and clashed with demonstrators with some damage to public buildings resulting in the Yugoslav People's Army being brought in. Clashes between police and protesters resulted in the deaths of a student and an officer, and injuries to over 200 people. Demonstrations ended after the government agreed to concessions.

Drašković became a leading opponent of Milošević. His fiery and emotional speeches earned him the moniker "Czar of the Streets".

While Drašković was a nationalist, he also held pro-Western and anti-war views. His plan was to rapidly transform the biggest and most populous part of Yugoslavia (i.e. Serbia) according to Western standards so that eventual international involvement in the Yugoslav crisis would favour Serbian interests and produce a peaceful solution. His ideological opponents often cite his strong nationalist feelings (including attempting rehabilitation of Serb-nationalist Chetniks) as contradictory to his insistence on peaceful solutions. Political opponents have claimed Drašković's political engagement at this early stage of his political career was full of inconsistencies and diametrically opposing views and actions. According to Drašković, his stance as pro-Western and peaceful never wavered, from the start of the political crisis in Yugoslavia. He insisted that a Serbian government should promote radical democratic shift, and renew traditional alliances with Western nations (including entry into NATO) as a way of preserving some form of Yugoslav confederation rather than pursuing direct confrontation with the Croats.

His party SPO organized a paramilitary unit called the Serbian Guard, led by former criminals such as Đorđe "Giška" Božović and Branislav "Beli" Matić. Božović died in Croatia in September 1991. Matić was killed by Milošević's secret police in April 1991. Although Drašković initially claimed that this militia was an incitement to Serbian authorities to form a non-ideological national armed force other than the Yugoslav People's Army, he eventually distanced himself from the paramilitary formation altogether.

According to historian Dubravka Stojanović, while Drašković's anti-war views were sincere, he also supported a nationalist program little different in its goals to those of Milošević, and he and his party were never able to reconcile these opposing currents.

His anti-war views came to the fore in mid to late 1991, particularly in November of that year when he wrote a passionate condemnation of the bloody siege of Vukovar in the Serbian daily Borba.

In early 1992, he called on all citizens of Bosnia to reject nationalism. In 1993, he and his wife Danica Drašković were arrested, beaten and sent to a high-security prison following street riots in Belgrade. His hunger strike, and international outrage over the situation, pressured the government to release the couple.

In 1996, SPO formed an opposition alliance Zajedno ("Together") with the Democratic Party of Zoran Đinđić and the Civic Alliance of Serbia under Vesna Pešić, which achieved major successes in the local elections in November of that year, but later split.

Drašković's SPO participated on its own at the September 1997 election, boycotted by his former partners despite an array of local electronic media outlets being in opposition hands.

In January 1999, SPO, a parliamentary party, was asked to join a coalition with Milošević's Socialist Party of Serbia as tension with US and NATO increased, to use his influence with Western politicians. In early 1999, Drašković became the deputy prime minister of the Federal Republic of Yugoslavia. He did so in response to Milošević's appeal for national unity in the face of Albanian uprising in Kosovo and a looming confrontation with NATO. He was sacked by the Prime Minister Momir Bulatović on 28 April 1999.

=== Attempts of assassination ===
See: Ibar Highway assassination attempt

There were two attempts to assassinate Drašković: on 3 October 1999 on the Ibar highway when four of his close associates were murdered, and on 15 June 2000 in Budva.

In 2005, Milorad Ulemek was sentenced to 40 years in prison for the murder of Đinđić and Ivan Stambolić and for the assassination attempt on Drašković in 2000.

=== Democratic changes ===
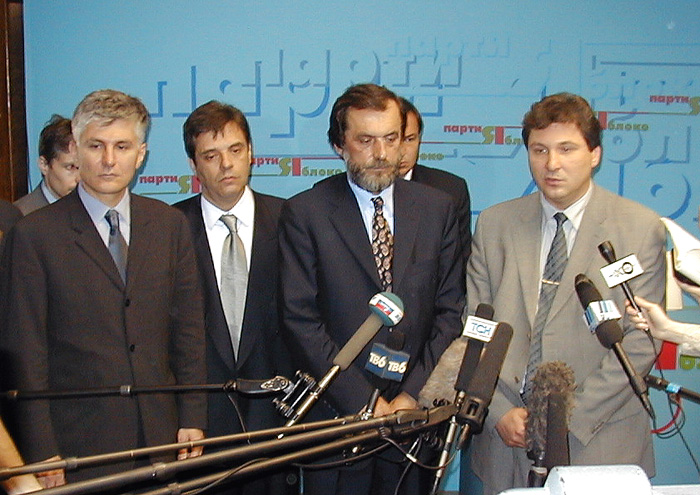
The bearers of democratic changes in the year 2000. from left to right: Zoran Đinđić, Vojislav Koštunica, Drašković, Grigory Yavlinsky.

In what he himself later termed "a bad political move", Drašković kept his SPO out of the wide anti-Milošević Democratic Opposition of Serbia (DOS) coalition that formed in 2000; his candidate in the 24 September 2000 federal presidential elections, Vojislav Mihailović, achieved little success, and the SPO was unsuccessful in the subsequent parliamentary election which the DOS won overwhelmingly. Because of this, Drašković and his party were marginalized over the next three years.

In the fall of 2002, he attempted a comeback as one of eleven candidates in a Serbian presidential election; this election was later declared invalid due to low voter turnout. Despite a polished marketing campaign that saw Drašković change his personal appearance and tone down his fiery rhetoric, he ended up with only 4.5% of the total vote, well behind Vojislav Koštunica (31.2%) and Miroljub Labus (27.7%), both of whom moved on to the second-round runoff.

His next chance for political redemption came in late 2003. Fully aware of SPO's weak political standing (as well as his own) after more than 3 years in political oblivion, Drašković entered his party into a pre-election coalition with New Serbia (NS), thus reuniting with old party colleague Velimir Ilić. Joining forces for the 2003 parliamentary election, they achieved limited success, but did manage to get into the coalition that formed the minority government (along with DSS, G17 Plus), providing it with critical parliamentary seats to keep the far-right radicals (SRS) at bay.

In the subsequent division of power, Drašković became foreign minister, a position he held until May 2007. In response to Montenegro's vote for independence, Drašković called for a restoration of Serbia's monarchy: "This is an historic moment for Serbia itself, a beginning which would be based on the historically-proven and victorious pillars of the Serbian state and I am talking about the pillars of a kingdom."

In August 2010, Drašković argued in favour of changing the Serbian Constitution of 2006 to remove references to Kosovo as a part of Serbia because according to him "Serbia has no national sovereignty over Kosovo whatsoever. All of Serbia knows that Kosovo is not really a province within Serbia, that it is completely beyond the control of the government and the state of Serbia".

== Personal life ==
Drašković is married to Danica (née Bošković). The two met in 1968 during student protests.

== Literary works ==
- Me, a philistine (1981)
- Judge (1981)
- Knife (1982)
- Prayer (1985)
- Prayer 2 (1986)
- Answers (1986)
- Russian Consul (1988)
- Everywhere Serbia (1989)
- Night of general (1994)
- Reminders (2001)
- Target (2007)
- Dr Aron (2009)
- Via Romana (2012)
- Far away (2013)
- The memoirs of Jesus (2015)
- Stories about Kosovo (2016)
- Slice of time (2016)
- Who killed Katarina? (2017)
- Aleksandar of Yugoslavia (2018)
- I grob i rob (2020)
- Ožiljci života (2022)
- Monah Hokaj (2023)
- Suđenje (2025)

== See also ==
- March 9th Protest
- Ibar Highway assassination attempt

Government offices
New seat	Deputy Prime Minister of Serbia and Montenegro; 1999 – 1999; With: Zoran Lilić; Jovan Zebić; Nikola Šainović; Danilo Vuksanović; Vladan Kutlešić	Succeeded by Maja Gojković
New seat	Deputy Prime Minister of Serbia and Montenegro; 1999 – 1999; With: Zoran Lilić; Jovan Zebić; Nikola Šainović; Danilo Vuksanović; Vladan Kutlešić	Succeeded by Tomislav Nikolić
Preceded by Goran Svilanović	Minister of Foreign Affairs of Serbia and Montenegro; 2004 – 2006	Union of Serbia and Montenegro abolished
New ministerial post	Minister of Foreign Affairs of Serbia; 2006 – 2007	Succeeded by Vuk Jeremić
