= Niš =

City in southern Serbia

Niš Ниш (Serbian)
- City
- Град Ниш; Grad Niš; City of Niš
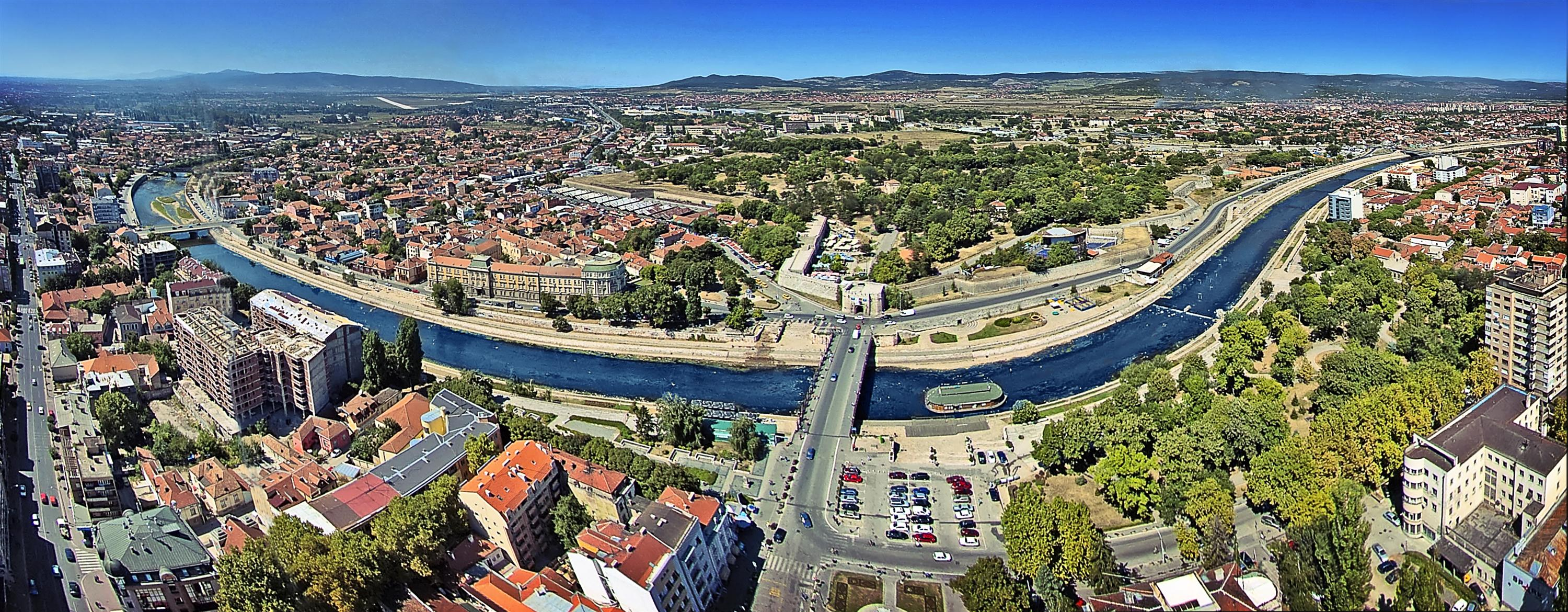
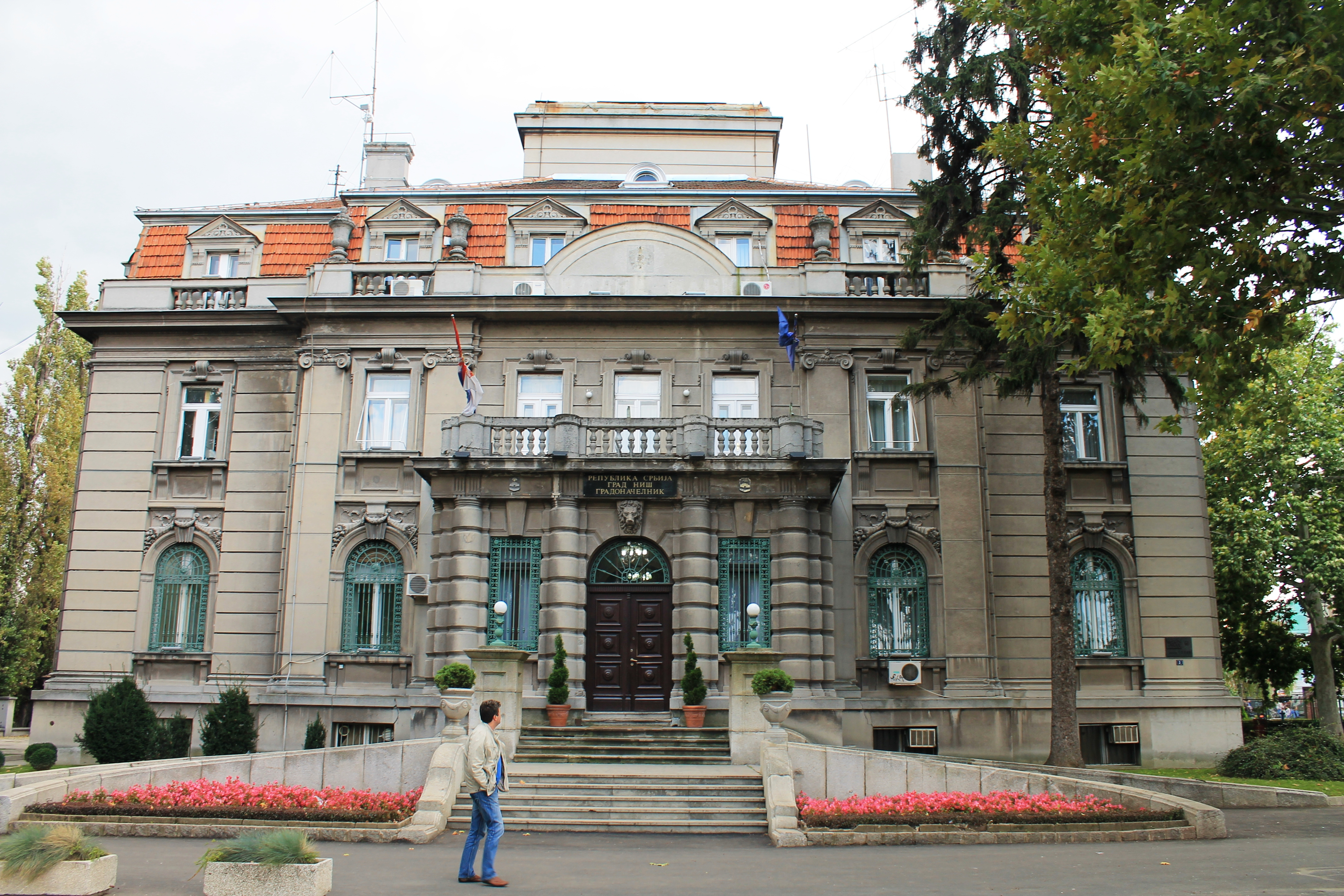
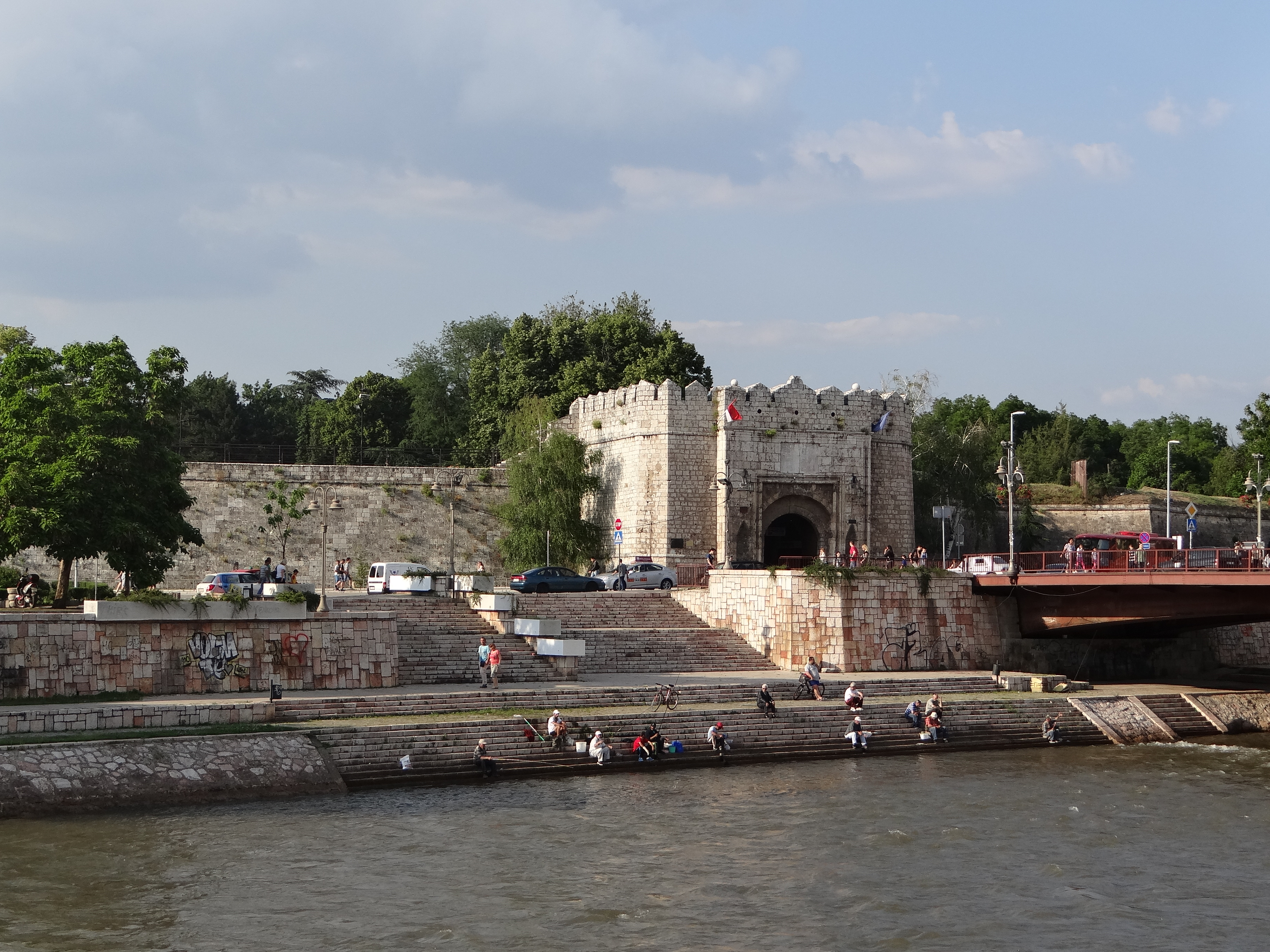
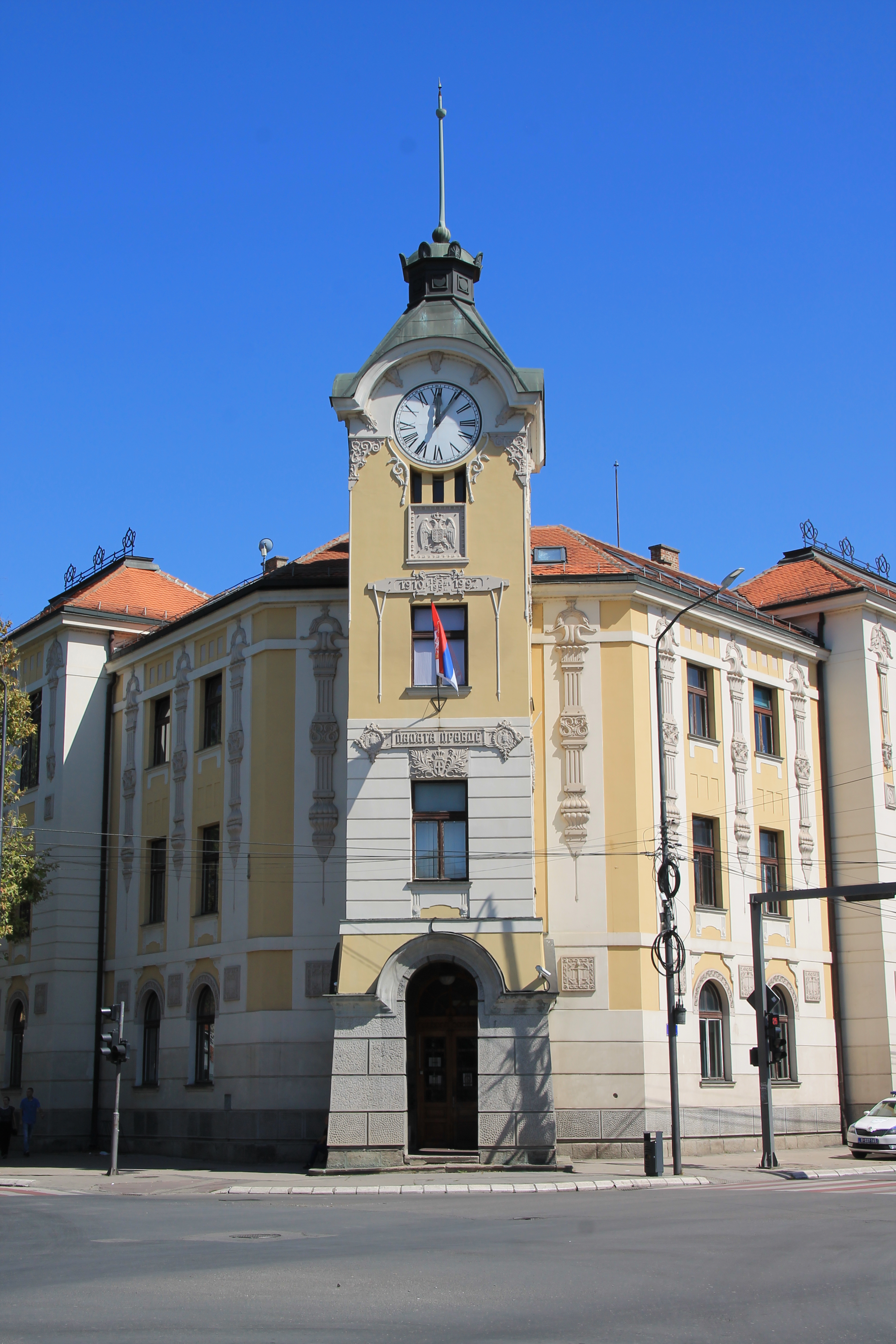
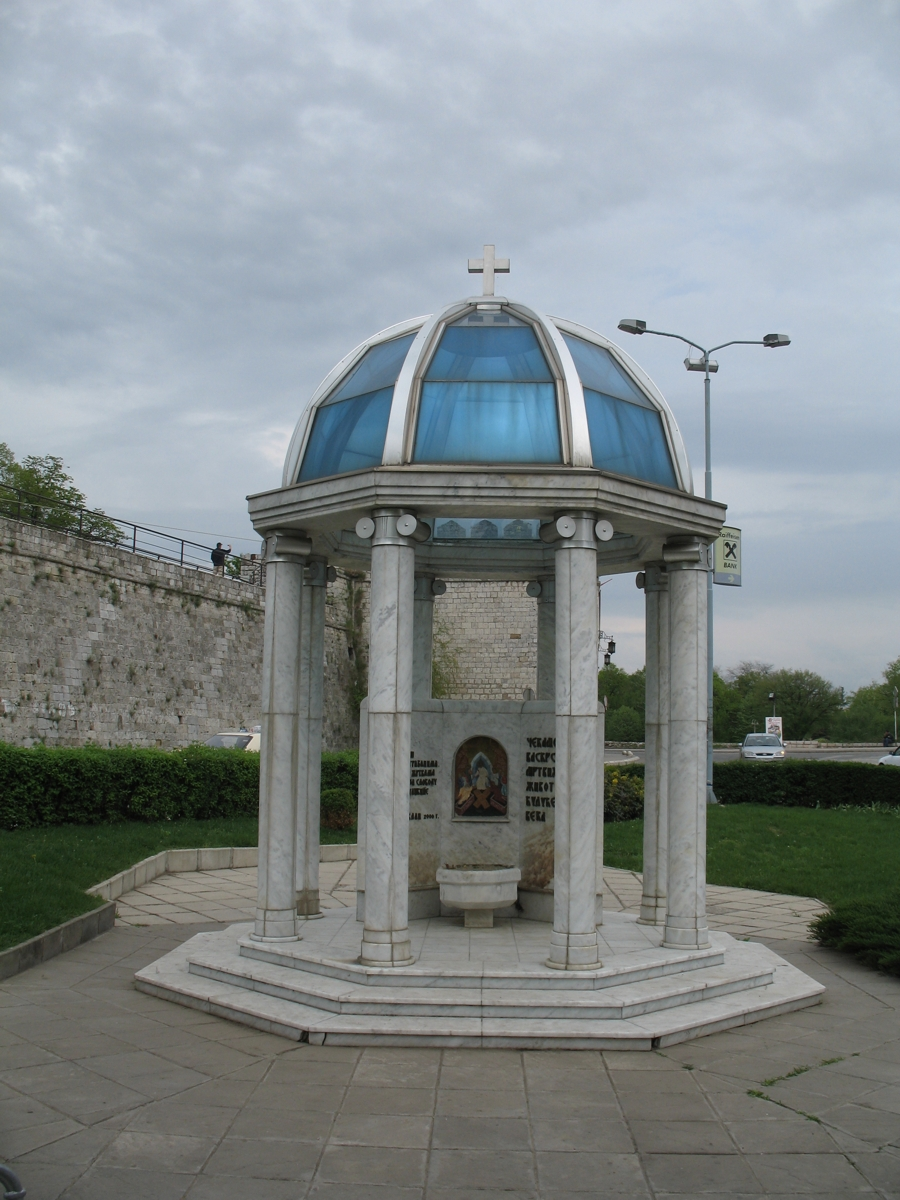
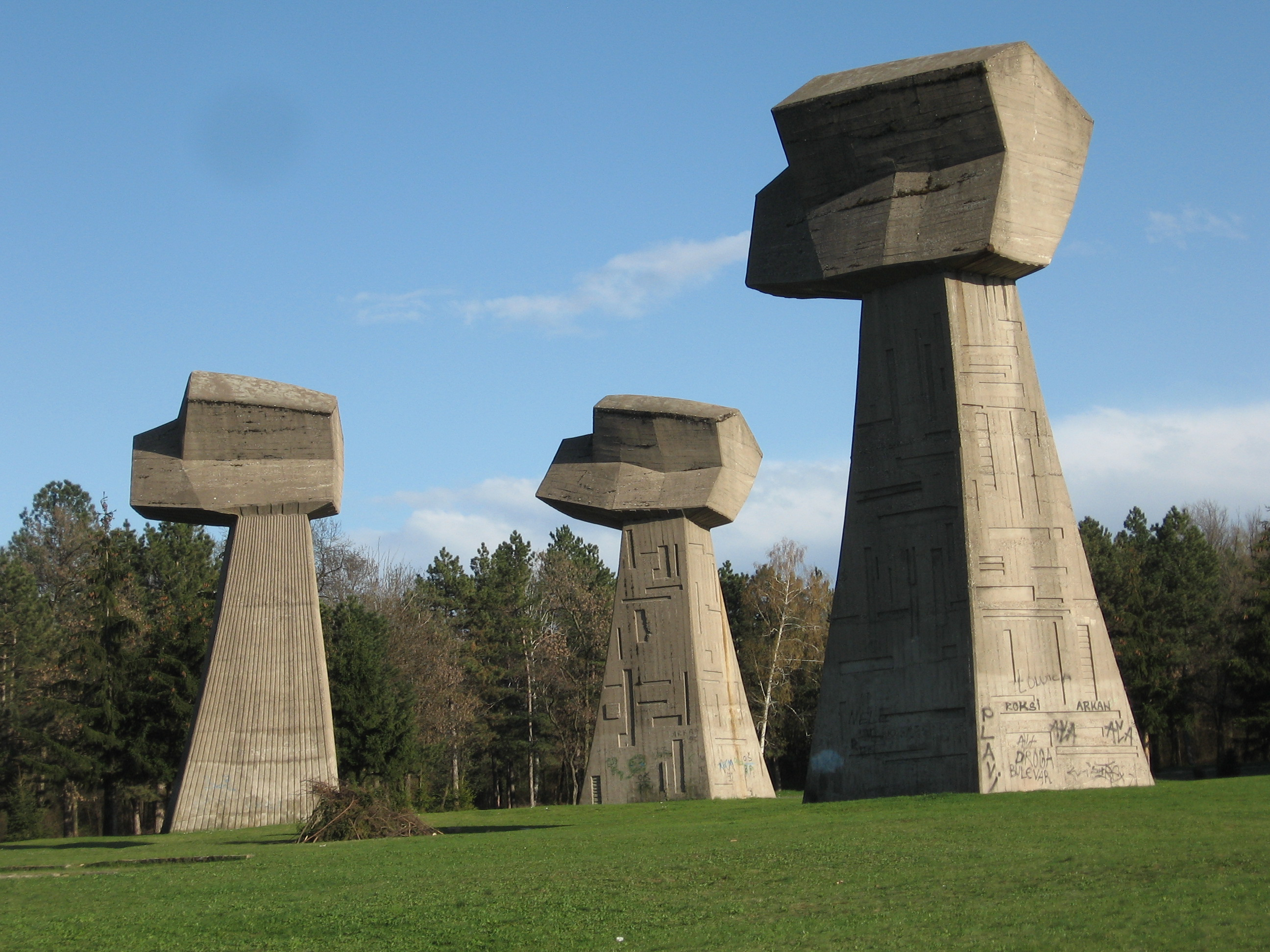
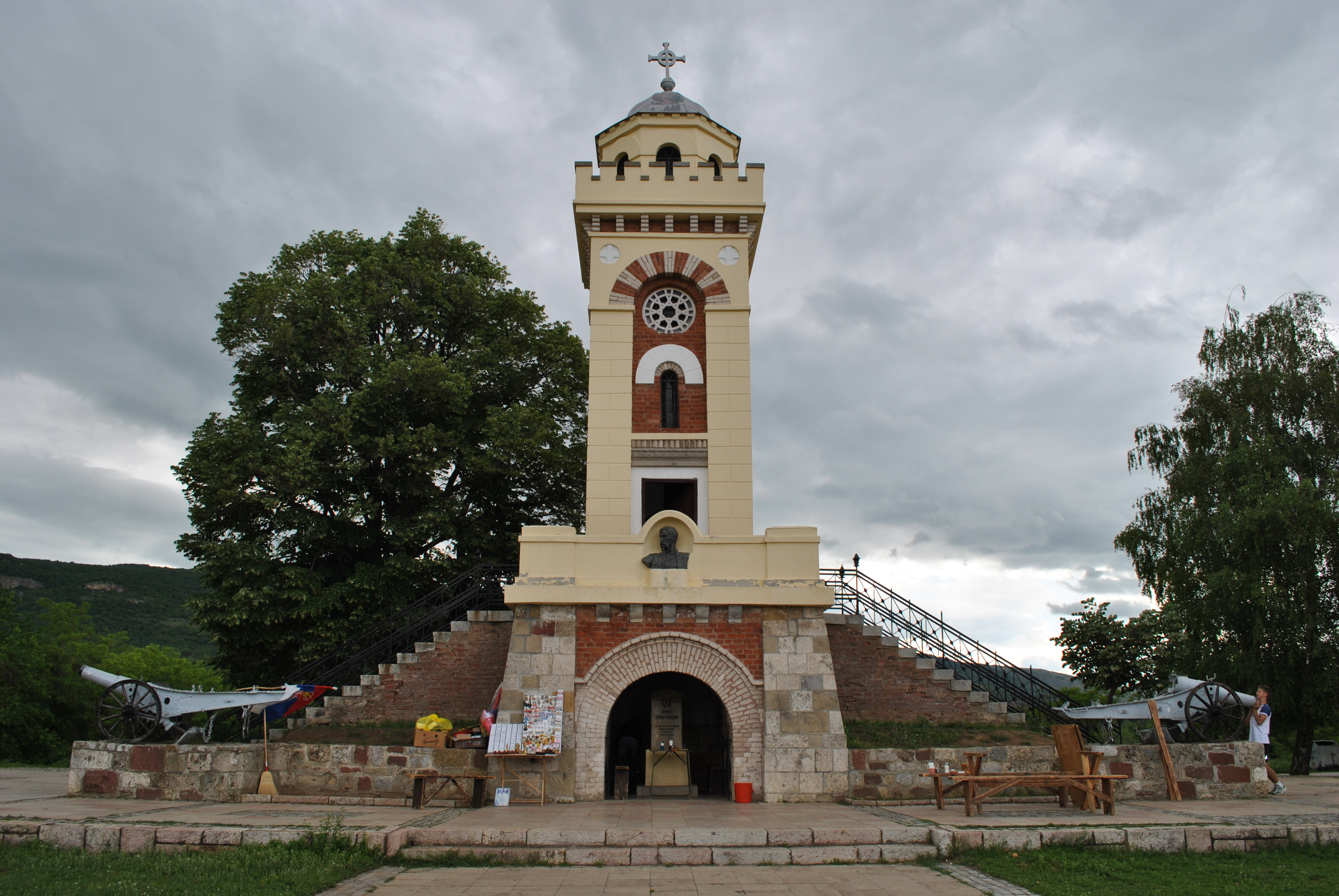
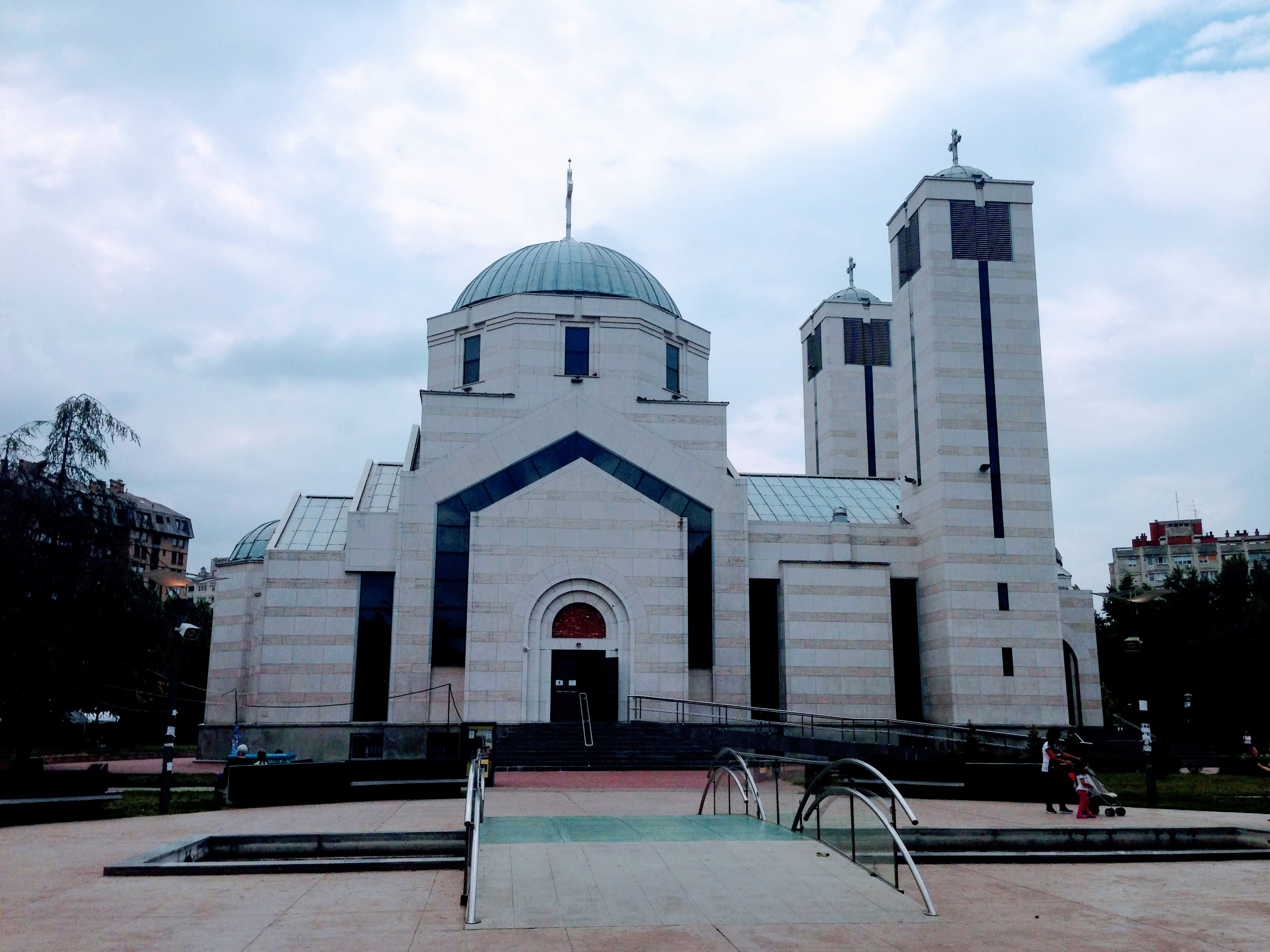
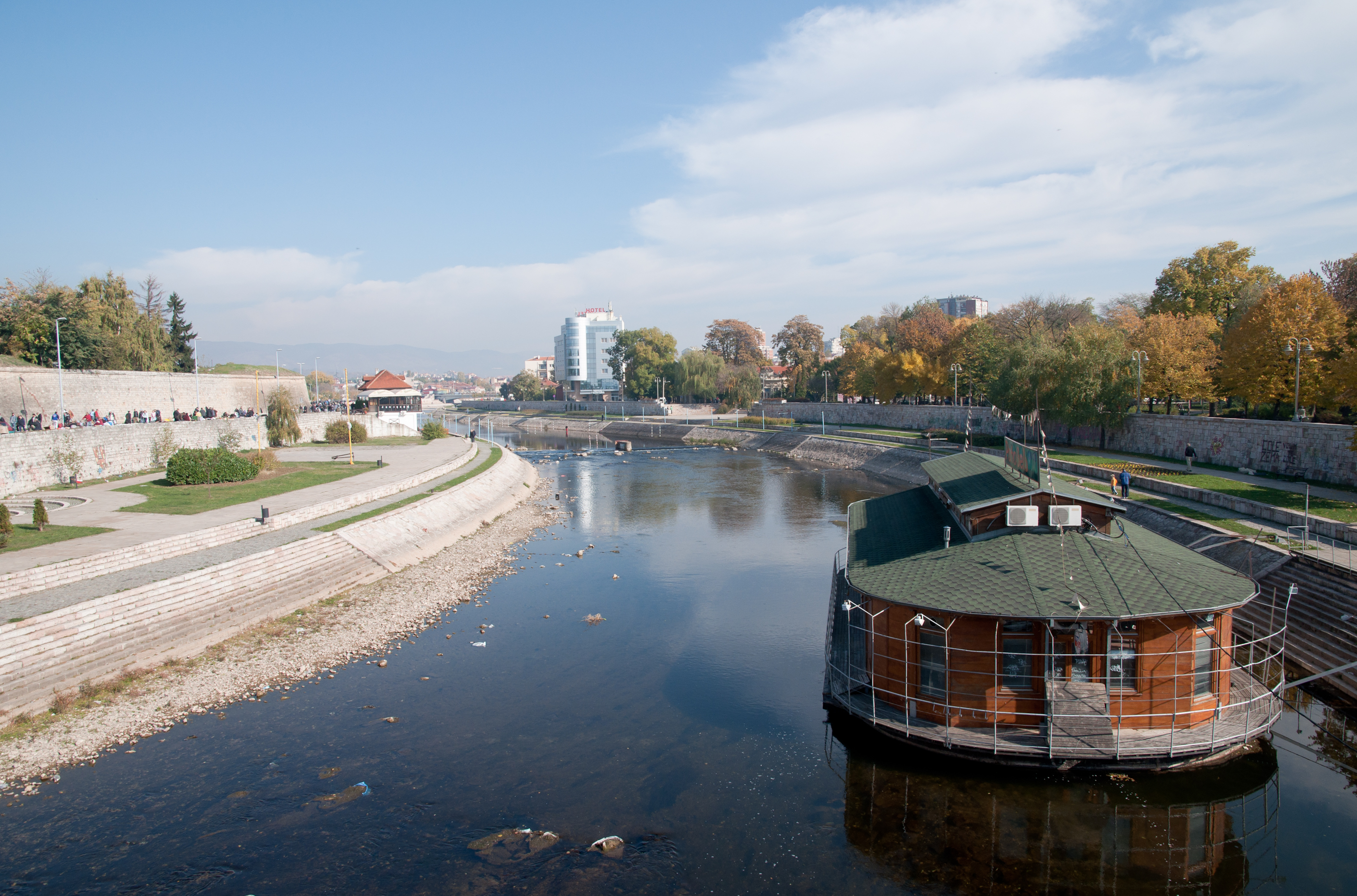
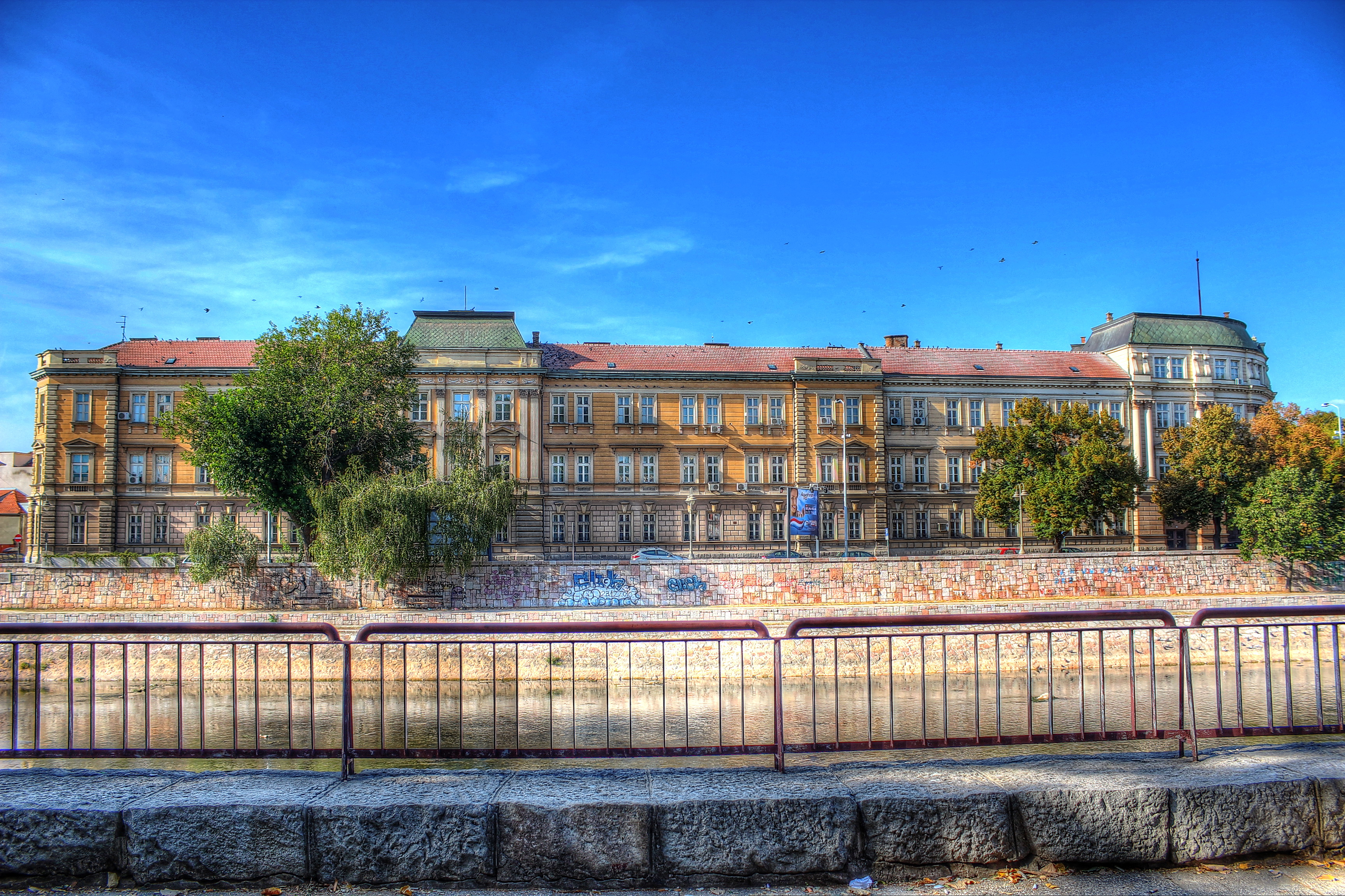
- Panorama of Niš Niš City Hall Niš Fortress Palace of Justice Memorial Chapel Bubanj Memorial Park Monument on Čegar Church of the Holy Emperor Constantine and Empress Helena Nišava river University of Niš

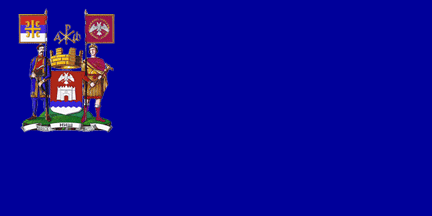
- Flag Coat of arms
- Nicknames: "Second capital" "Imperial City"
- Location within Serbia Location within Europe Niš (Europe)
- Coordinates: 43°19′15″N 21°53′45″E
- Country: Serbia
- Geographical Region: Southern Serbia
- Statistical Region: Southern and Eastern
- District: Nišava
- Municipalities: 5
- First mention: 2nd century AD
- Liberation from Ottomans: 11 January 1878

Government
  - Mayor: Dragoslav Pavlović (SNS)
  - Ruling parties: SNS/SPS/SRS
  - Legislature: City Assembly of Niš

Area
  - City: 42 km^{2} (16 sq mi)
  - Urban: 596.6 km^{2} (230.3 sq mi)
  - Rank: 51st in Serbia
- Elevation: 195 m (640 ft)

Population (2022)
  - City: 178,976
  - Rank: 3rd in Serbia
  - Density: 4,261/km^{2} (11,040/sq mi)
  - Urban: 249,501
  - Urban density: 418.2/km^{2} (1,083/sq mi)
- Demonym(s): Nišlijka (female); Nišlija (male)
- Time zone: UTC+1 (CET)
  - Summer (DST): UTC+2 (CEST)
- Postal code: 18000
- Area code: +381(0)18
- ISO 3166 code: SRB
- Car plates: NI
- Official languages: Serbian
- Patron Saint: Procopius of Scythopolis
- Website: www.ni.rs

Niš (/ˈniːʃ/; Serbian Cyrillic: Ниш, Serbian pronunciation: [nîːʃ]; names in other languages), less often spelled in English as Nish, is the third largest city in Serbia and the administrative center of the Nišava District. It is located in the southern part of Serbia. According to the 2022 census, the city proper has a population of 178,976, while its administrative area has a population of 249,501 inhabitants.

Several Roman emperors were born in Niš or used it as a residence: Constantine the Great, the first Christian emperor and the founder of Constantinople, Constantius III, Constans, Vetranio, Julian, Valentinian I, Valens; and Justin I. Emperor Claudius Gothicus decisively defeated the Goths at the Battle of Naissus (present-day Niš). Later playing a prominent role in the history of the Byzantine Empire, the city's past would earn it the nickname Imperial City.

After about 400 years of Ottoman rule, the city was liberated in 1878 and became part of the Principality of Serbia, though not without great bloodshed—remnants of which can be found throughout the city. Today, Niš is one of the most important economic centers in Serbia, especially in the electronics, mechanical engineering, textile, and tobacco industries. Constantine the Great Airport is Niš's international airport. The city is also the seat of the University of Niš, the Eparchy of Niš and the Command of Serbian Army.

In 2013, the city was host to the celebration of 1,700 years of Constantine's Edict of Milan.

== Name ==
Niš was known as Нишь or Ньшь (Nyšь) in Old Serbian and Old Bulgarian. Nāissus is the ancient name of the city. Naissus is itself probably a derivative of the older *Nāviskos, from *Nāvia ("trough valley"), the Celtic name of the Nišava River, which flows through the city. In historical sources, the town is mentioned as Naissus, Ναϊσσός, Naessus, urbs Naisitana, Нишь, Ньшь, Nisso and Nix.

Niš evolved from the toponym attested in Ancient Greek as ΝΑΙΣΣΟΣ (Naissos), achieving its present form via phonetic changes in Proto-Albanian, after which the place name entered Slavic. Nish might indicate that Proto-Albanian was spoken in the region in pre-Slavic antiquity. According to Ismajli (2015), when this settlement happened is a matter of debate, as Proto-Albanians might have moved relatively late in antiquity in the area which might have been an eastern expansion of Proto-Albanian settlement as no other toponyms known in antiquity in the area presuppose an Albanian development. It cannot be ruled out however that the development of Nish < Naiss- may also represent a regional development in late antiquity Balkans which, while closely related to Albanian (i.e. characterized by the same phonetic system), may not have been identical to it. Attempts have been made to explain the place name in various ways as "a purely Slavic development", such as by Serbian linguist Aleksandar Loma; however, Austrian linguist Joachim Matzinger, who maintains the Albanian transmission of Naiss > Niš, states that "a discussion with historical South Slavic linguistics is an urgent desideratum".

== History ==
=== Early history ===
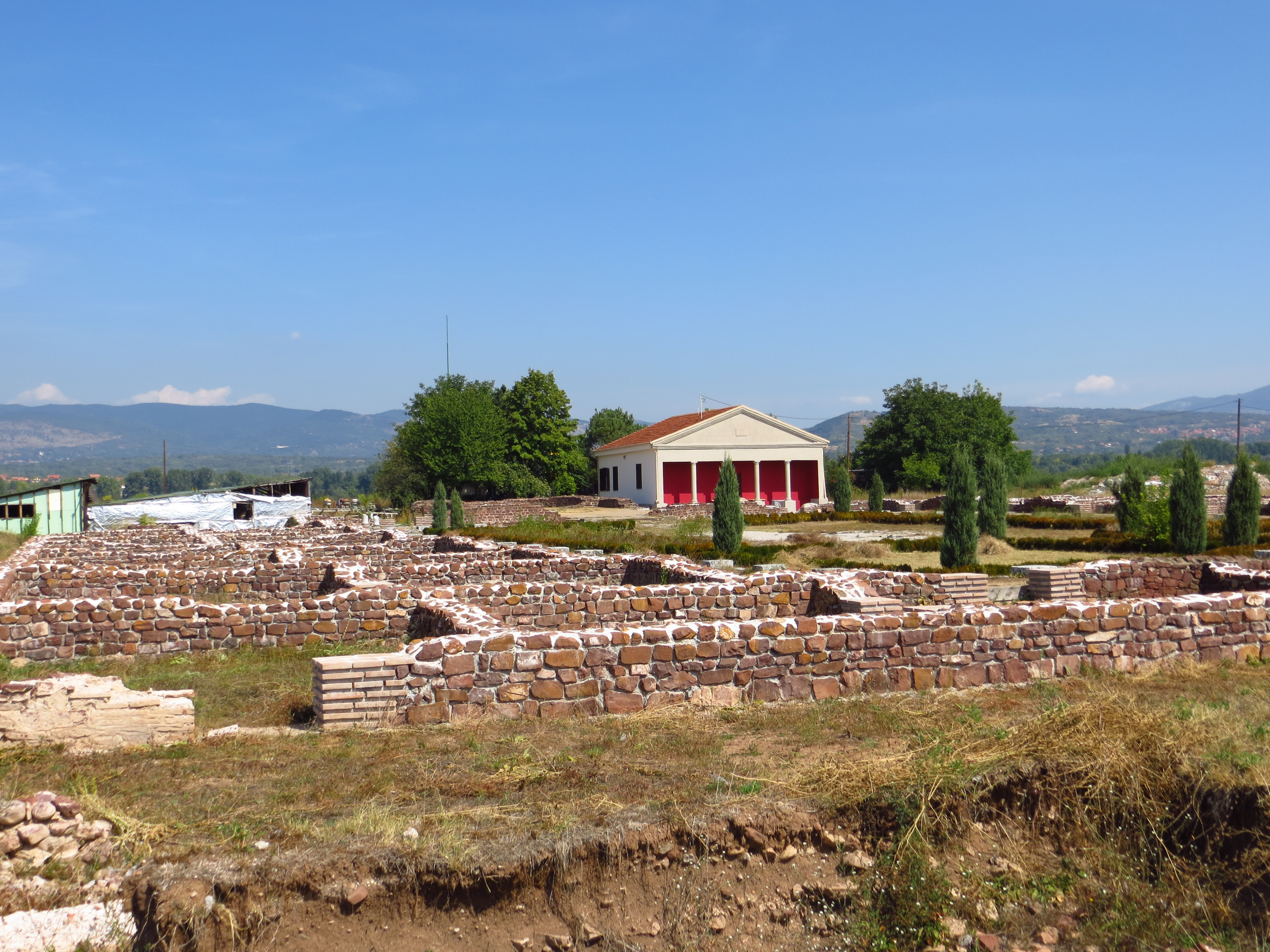
Remains of the luxurious residence palace of Mediana, erected by Constantine I near his birth town of Naissus.

The first settlement on the site of today's Niš may have been founded by the Celts at the end of the 3rd century BC. There is, however, very little archaeological evidence that can be used to reconstruct the pre-Roman history of Niš. During the Roman era, the city of Naissus became a large urban center. During the Roman conquest of the Balkans, between 168 and 75 BC, the city was used as a base of operations. Naissus was first mentioned in Roman documents near the beginning of the 2nd century CE, and was considered a place worthy of note in the Geography of Ptolemy of Alexandria.

The Romans occupied the town during the Dardanian campaign (75–73 BC), and set up a legionary camp in the city. The city, called refugia and vici in pre-Roman relation, as a result of its strategic position (the Thracians were based to the south) developed as an important garrison and market town in the province of Moesia Superior. In 169 AD, Naissus was established as a municipium and from Diocletian onwards it belonged to the province of Dardania. In 272, the future Emperor Constantine the Great was born in Naissus. Constantine created the Dacia Mediterranea province, of which Naissus was the capital, which also included Remesiana on the Via Militaris and the towns of Pautalia and Germania. He lived in Naissus briefly from 316 to 322.

The city was of great importance for the Constantinian dynasty. It is the birthplace of Constantine the Great who turned it from a middle-sized town to a large city with many public buildings. The city flourished greatly in the Constantinian period. A bronze bust of Constantine was erected in the city. It was his temporary residence and the city where he promulgated many laws, preserved in the Theodosian code. In Constantinian narratives, Naissus was the city where the usurper Vetranio abdicated to Constantius II after a powerful speech he gave to the rebel armies. Julian, the last Constantinian emperor, used Naissus, which had arms factories, as his base in the civil war and recruited Illyrians and others as soldiers for his campaign.

In 364 AD, the imperial Villa Mediana 3 km (2 mi) was the site where emperors Valentinian and Valens met and divided the Roman Empire into halves which they would rule as co-emperors.

It was besieged by the Huns in 441 and devastated in 448, and again in 480 when the partially-rebuilt town was demolished by the Barbarians. Byzantine Emperor Justinian I restored the town but it was destroyed by the Avars once again. The Slavs, in their campaign against Byzantium, conquered Niš and settled here in 540.

=== Middle Ages ===
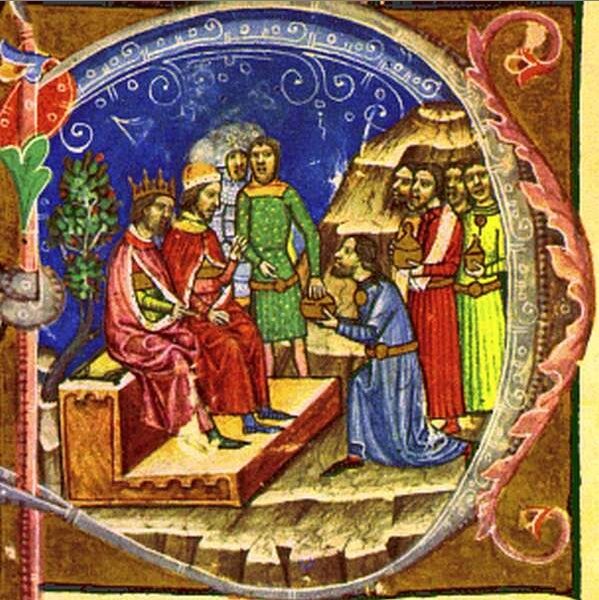
King Solomon and Prince Géza receive gifts from the locals at Niš in 1072 (Chronicon Pictum, 1358)

In 805, the town and its surroundings were taken by Bulgarian Emperor Krum. In the 11th century Byzantium reclaimed control over Naissus and the surrounding area.

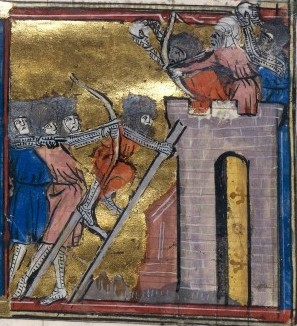
Siege of Niš, Crusaders attacking Naissus on 4 July 1096

King Solomon of Hungary and Prince Géza marched along the valley of the river Great Morava as far as Niš. The Hungarians seized the Byzantine city without any resistance in 1072. During the People's Crusade, on 3 July 1096, Peter the Hermit clashed with Byzantine forces at Naissus. Manuel I fortified the town, but under his successor Andronikos I it was seized by the Hungarian king Béla III. Byzantine control was eventually reestablished, but in 1185 it fell under Serbian control. By 1188, Niš became the capital of Serbian king Stefan Nemanja. On 27 July 1189, Nemanja received German emperor Frederick Barbarossa and his 100,000 crusaders at Niš. Niš is mentioned in descriptions of Serbia under Vukan in 1202, highlighting its special status. In 1203, Kaloyan of Bulgaria annexed Niš. Stefan Nemanjić later regained the region.

=== Ottoman period ===
The fall of the Serbian Empire, which was conquered by Ottoman Sultan Murad I in 1385, decided the fate of Niš as well. After a 25-day-long siege the city fell to the Ottomans. It was returned to Serbian rule in 1443. Niš again fell under Ottoman rule in 1448, and remained thusly for 241 years. During Ottoman rule Niš was a seat of the empire's military and civil administration. A Silesian traveler stated in 1596 that the route from Sofia to Niš was littered with corpses and described the gates of Niš as bedecked with the freshly-severed heads of poor Bulgarian peasants. In 1689, Niš was seized by the Austrian army during the Great Turkish War, but the Ottomans regained it in 1690. In 1737, Niš was again seized by the Austrians, who attempted to rebuild the fortifications around the city. The same year, the Ottomans reclaimed the city without resistance. The existing fortification is of Ottoman Turkish origin, dating from the first decades of the 18th century (1719–1723). It is well known as one of the most significant and best preserved monuments of this kind in the mid-Balkans. The Fortress was erected on the site of earlier fortifications – the ancient Roman, Byzantine, and later yet Medieval forts.

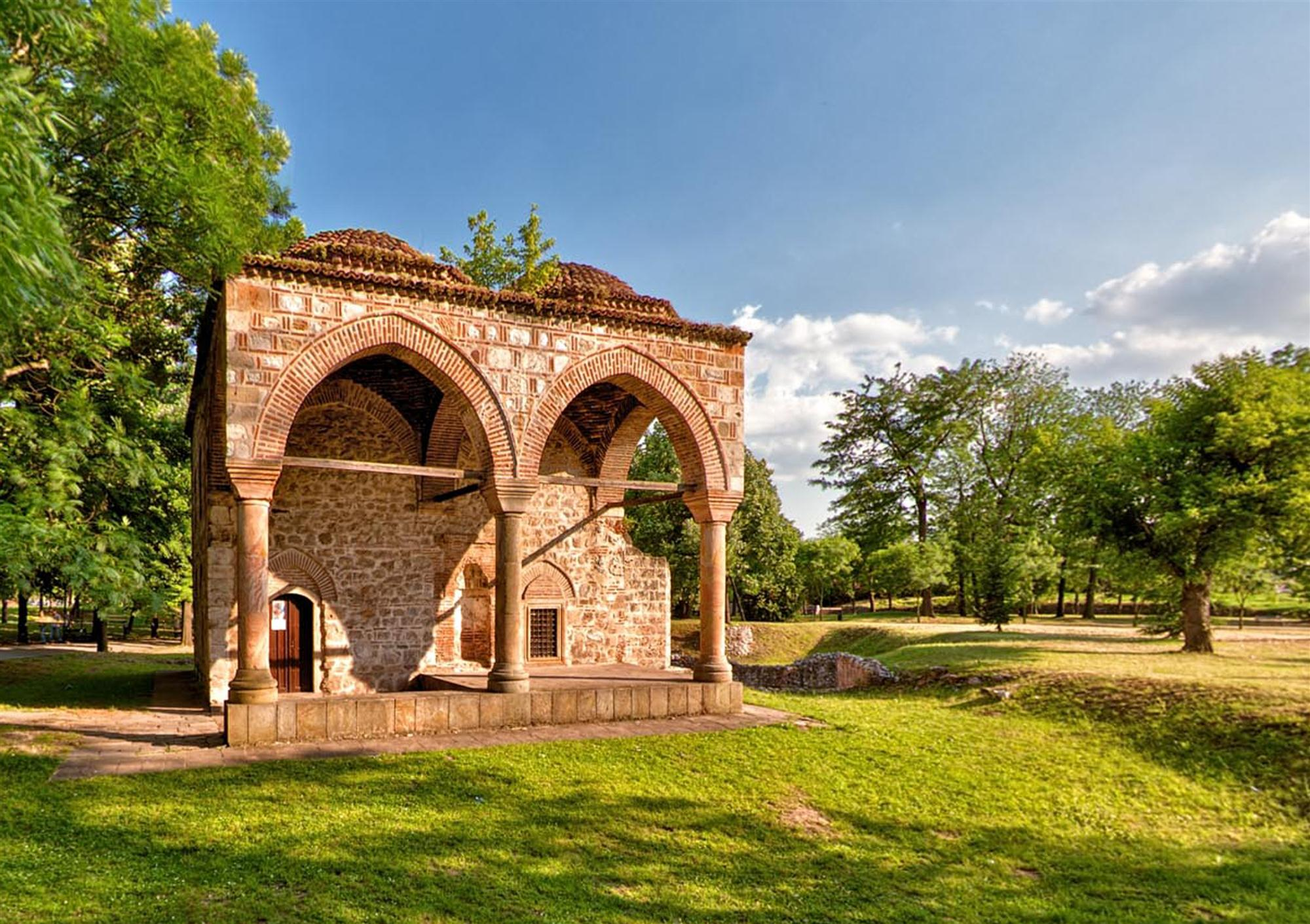
Bali-begova mosque

During the First Serbian uprising in 1809, Serbian revolutionaries attempted to liberate Niš in the Battle of Čegar. After the defeat of the Serbian forces, the Ottoman commander of Niš ordered the heads of the slain Serbs mounted on a tower to serve as a warning. The structure became known as Skull Tower (Serbian: Ćele Kula). In 1821, the Ottomans arrested the Bishop of Niš, Milentija, as well as 200 Serbian patriots, on charges of preparing an uprising in the Niš area in support of the Greek War of Independence. On June 13 of that year, Bishop Milentija and other Serbian leaders were hanged in public.

In the 19th century Niš was an important town, but populated by Bulgarians in the 19th century, when the Niš rebellion broke out in 1841. According to Ottoman statistics during the Tanzimat the population of Sanjak of Niš was treated as Bulgarian, and according to French travelers such as Jérôme-Adolphe Blanqui and Ami Boue in 1837/1841. According to all authors between 1840 and 1872 the delineation between Bulgarians and Serbs is undisputed and ran north of Nis, although one author Cyprien Robert claims that half of the population of the town was made up by Serbians. Serbian cartographers of the time (such as Dimitrije Davidović in 1828 and Milan Savić in 1878) also accepted South Morava river as such delineation and added Niš outside the borders of the Serbian people. In 1862 some Muslim families from Belgrade and Smederevo settled in Nis due to the forced displacement of Muslims in the Principality of Serbia. The urban population of Niš consisted of 17,107 Christian and 4,291 Muslim males, with total number of 3,500 Serbian houses and 2,000 Muslim houses. Muslim population of Niš consisted mainly of Turks, of which a part were of Albanian origin, and the rest were Muslim Albanians and Muslim Romani.

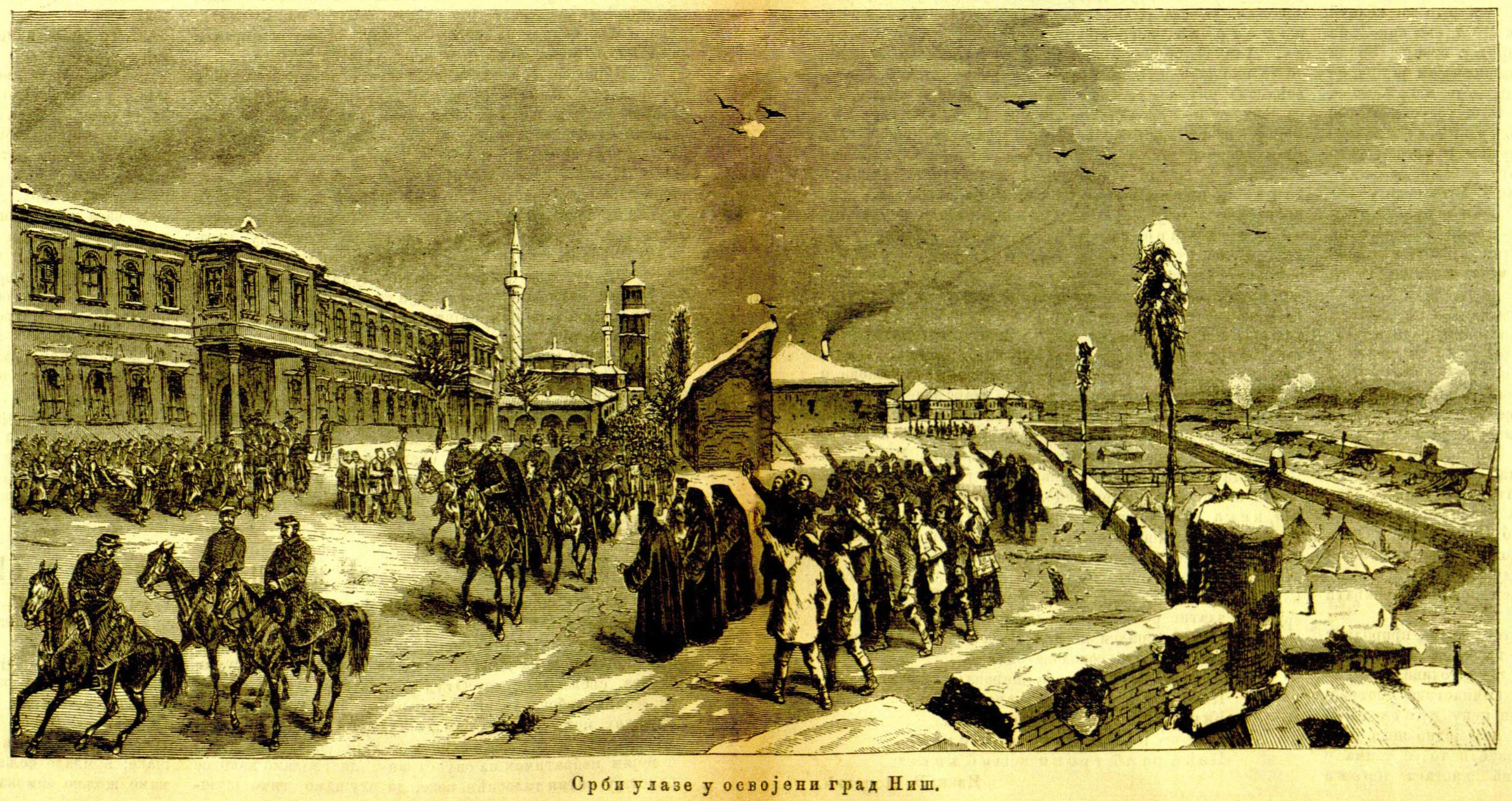
The Serbian army liberated Niš in the Serbian–Turkish Wars

In 1870, Niš was included in the Bulgarian Exarchate. Before the area had been under the Ecumenical Patriarchate of Constantinople and the Serbian Patriarchate of Peć. The city was also stipulated the area to be ceded to Bulgaria according to the Constantinople Conference in 1876.

Niš was finally taken by the Serbian Army during the Serbo–Ottoman War of 1876–1878. The battle for the liberation of Niš started on 29 December 1877, and the Serbian Army entered Niš on 11 January 1878, and it became a part of Serbia. The Albanian quarter was burned and some of the town's Muslim population, which the majority were Albanians, were forced to flee to the Ottoman vilayet of Kosovo, resettling in Pristina, while others went to Skopje. The descendants of the Albanians that resettled in parts of now Kosovo, are now known as Muhaxhir. The number of remaining Muslims counted were 1,168, with many being Muslim Romani, out of the pre-war ca. 8,500. The Albanian bazaar in Niš was destroyed. 12 out of 15 mosques and about 1,300 out of 4,000 houses were torn down, while the rest of the Muslim houses were sold at discounted prices. The destruction of buildings owned by Muslims, Jews and recalcitrant Christians was followed by the widening of streets and other measures to "modernise" the town and weaken its Ottoman outlook. Albanian traders who wanted to stay were subjected to a targeted campaign of murder. The Serbian authorities subjected the Jewish community to extortion of money, arbitrary arrests, confiscation of property, forced labour and desecration of graves. The demographics of Niš underwent change whereby Serbs who formed half the urban population prior to 1878 became 80 percent in 1884.

=== Independent Serbia ===
In the following years, the city saw rapid development. The city library was founded in 1879 and the famous Serbian writer Stevan Sremac, a native of Niš, was its first clerk. The first hotel, Europe, was built in 1879; shortly after the first district hospital and the first bank started operating in 1881. In 1878, the first Grammar School (Gimnazija), in 1882 the Teacher Training College, and in 1894, the Girls' College were founded in Niš. The City Hall was built from 1882 to 1887.

In 1883, Kosta Čendaš established the first printing house. In 1884, the first newspaper in the city Niški Vesnik was started. In 1884, Jovan Apel built a brewery. A railway line to Niš was built in 1884, as well as the city's railway station; on 8 August 1884, the first train arrived from Belgrade. In 1885, Niš became the last station of the Orient Express, until the railroad was built between Niš and Sofia in 1888. In 1887, the Niš Theatre Sinđelić was built.

In 1897 Mita Ristić founded the Nitex textile factory. In 1905 the female painter Nadežda Petrović established the Sićevo art colony. The first film was screened in 1897, and the first permanent cinema started operating in 1906. The hydroelectric dam in Sićevo Gorge on the Nišava was built in 1908; at the time, it was the largest in Serbia. The airfield was built in 1912 on the Trupale field, and the first aeroplane arrived on 29 December 1912. The city's museum was founded in 1913.

During the First Balkan War, Niš was the seat of The Main Headquarters of the Serbian Army, which led military operations against the Ottoman Empire. In World War I, Niš was the wartime capital of Serbia, hosting the Government and the National Assembly, until Central Powers conquered Serbia in November 1915, when the city was ceded to Bulgaria. After the breakthrough of the Salonika front, the First Serbian Army commanded by general Petar Bojović liberated Niš on 12 October 1918.

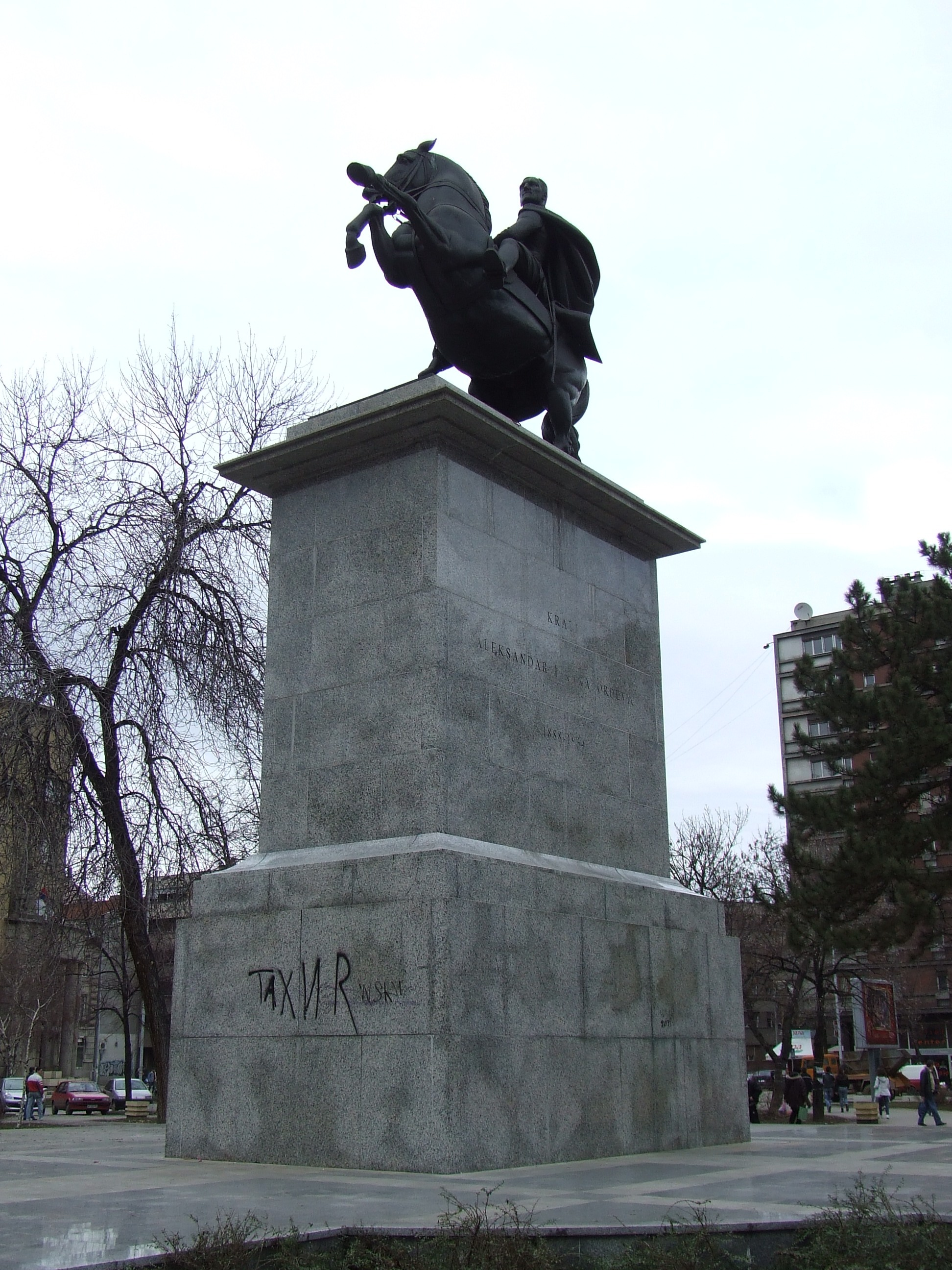
Monument to Alexander I of Yugoslavia, King Alexander Square

=== During the age and breakup of Yugoslavia ===
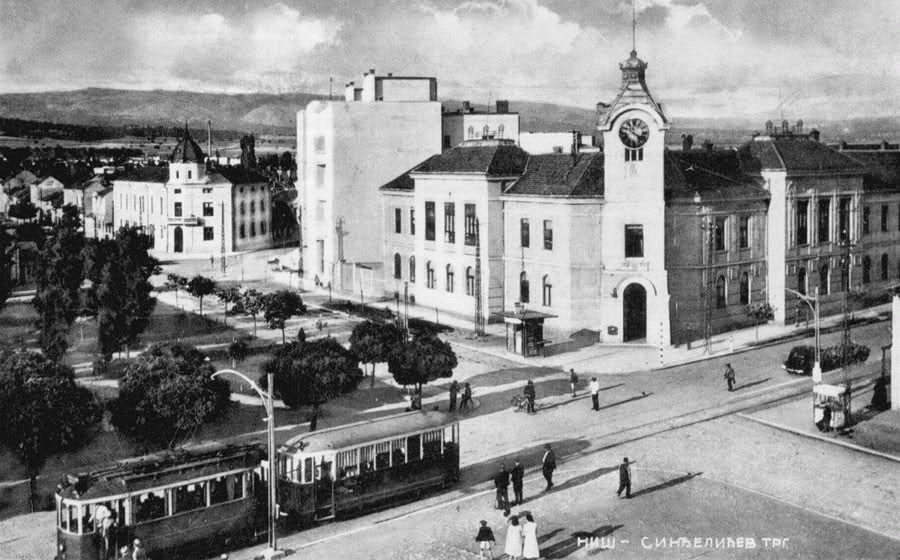
Tram in Niš 1930.

In the first few years after the war, Niš was recovering from the damage. In 1921, Niš became the centre of the Region (oblast), governed by a grand-župan, appointed by royal decree. From 1929 to 1941, Niš was the capital of the Morava Banovina of the Kingdom of Yugoslavia. The tram system in Niš started to run in November 1930. The national airline Aeroput included Niš as a regular destination for the route Belgrade—Niš—Skopje—Thessaloniki in 1930. During the time of German occupation in World War II, the first Nazi Crveni Krst concentration camp in Yugoslavia was in Niš. About 30,000 people passed through this camp, of whom over 10,000 were shot on nearby Bubanj hill. On 12 February 1942, 147 prisoners staged a mass escape. In 1944, the city was heavily bombed by the Allies. In September 1943, the Germans established the Dulag 413 transit camp for Italian Military Internees in the city.

On 14 October 1944, after a long and exhausting battle, the 7th German SS Division 'Prinz Eugen' was defeated and Niš was liberated by Bulgarian Army, and Partisans. The city was also the site of a unique and accidental friendly fire air war on November 7, 1944 between the air forces of the United States and Soviet Union. On 23 June 1948, Niš was the site of a catastrophic flood during which the Nišava river's water level raised by an unprecedented 5.5 meters.

After World War II, the University of Niš was founded on 15 June 1965.

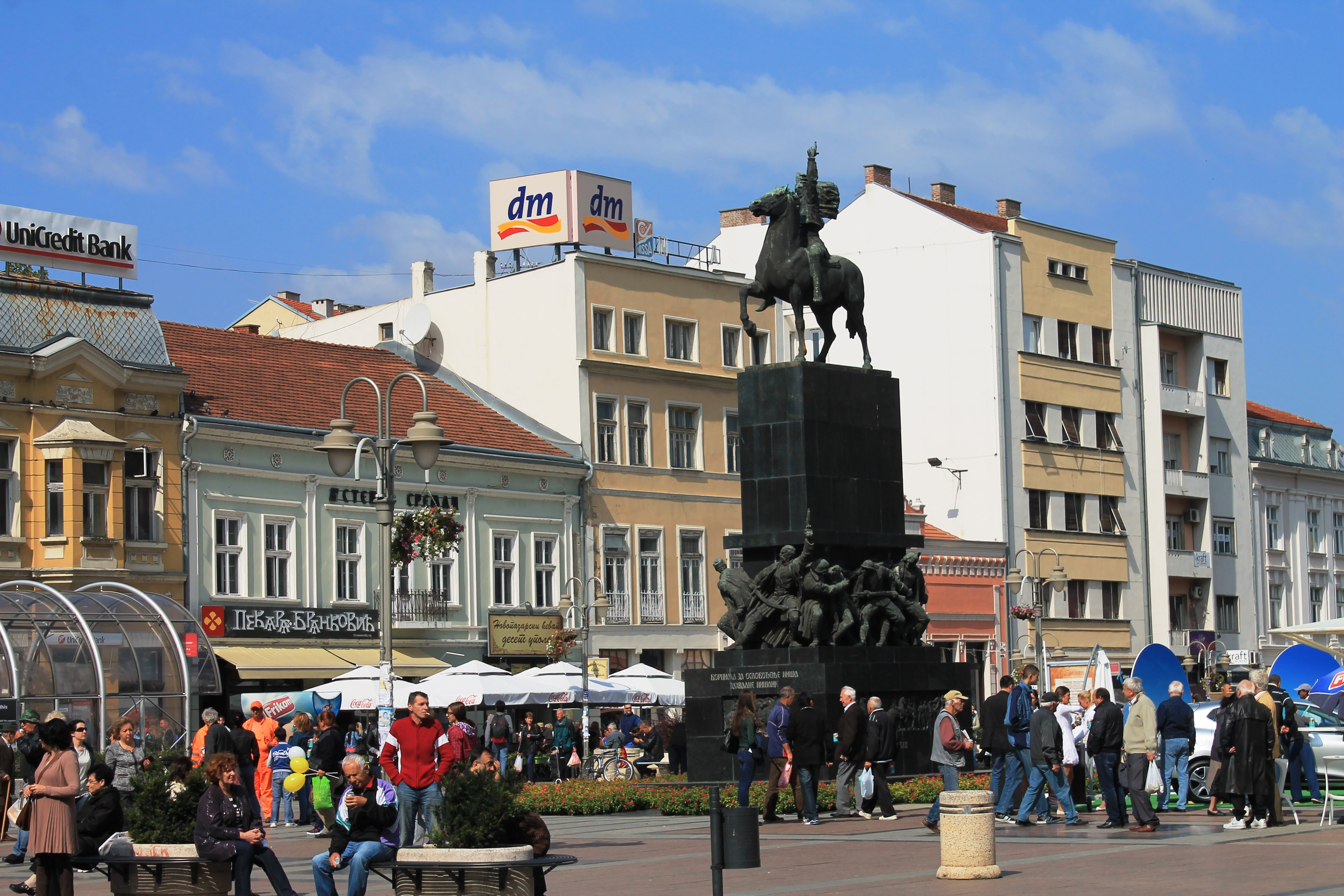
Niš main square.

Over the course of the 1999 NATO bombing of Yugoslavia, Niš was subject to airstrikes on 40 occasions. On 7 May 1999, the city was the site of a NATO cluster bomb raid which killed 16 civilians. By the end of the NATO bombing campaign, a total of 56 people in Niš had been killed from airstrikes.

=== 2000–present ===
In April 2012, the Russian-Serbian Humanitarian Center was established in the city of Niš. In December 2017, a new building of Clinical Centre of Niš spreading over 45,000 square meters was opened.

== Geography ==
The road running from the North, from Western and Central Europe and Belgrade down to the Morava River valley, forks into two major lines at Niš: the southern line, leading to Thessalonica and Athens, and the eastern one leading towards Sofia and Istanbul.

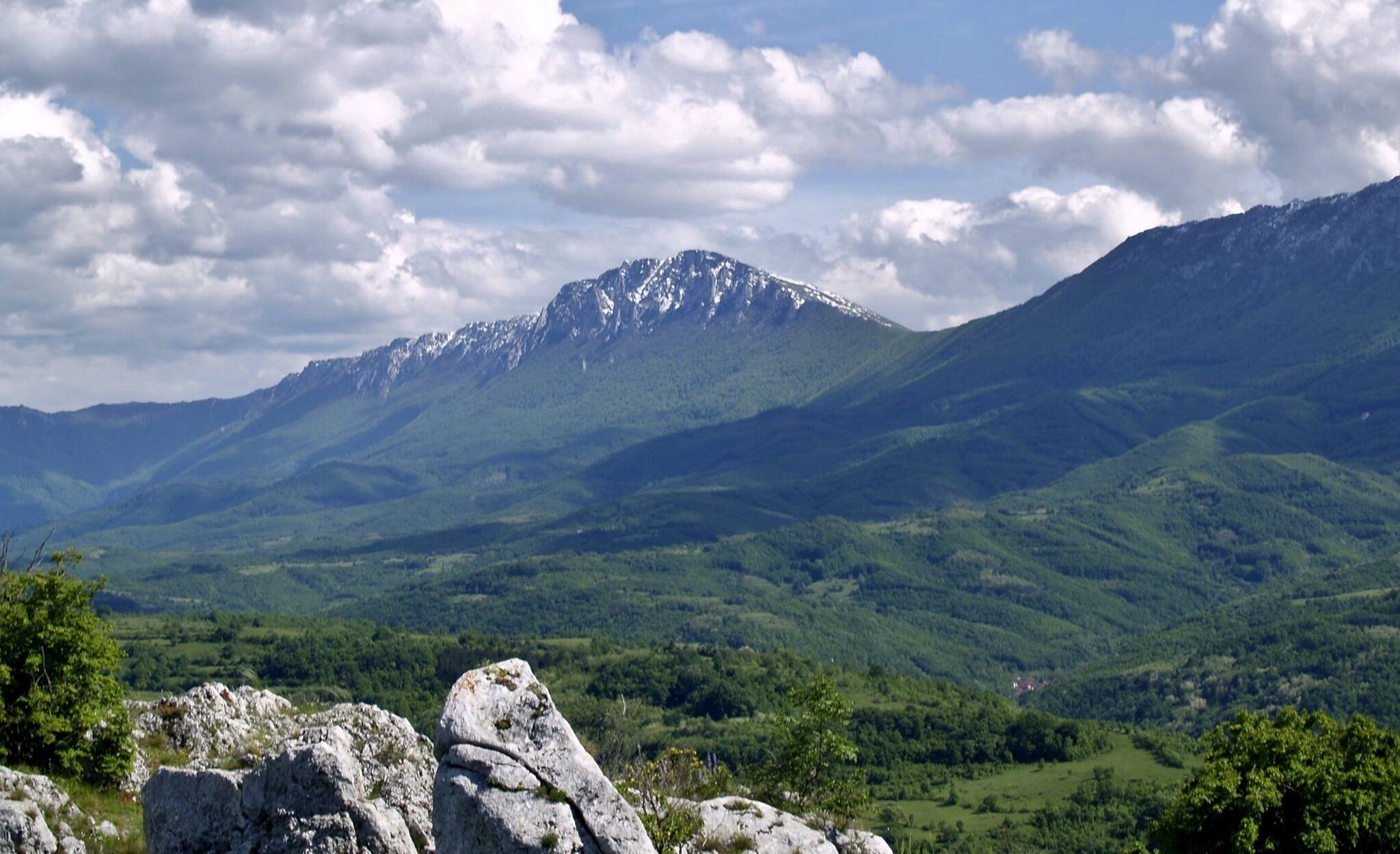
Suva Planina (Dry Mountain) surrounds the city

Niš is situated at the 43°19' latitude north and 21°54' longitude east, in the Nišava valley, near the spot where it joins the South Morava. The main city square, the city's central part, is at 194 m (636 ft) above sea level. The highest point in the city area is "Sokolov kamen" (Falcon's rock) on the Suva Planina (Dry Mountain) (1,523 m (4,997 ft)) while the lowest spot is at Trupale, near the mouth of the Nišava (173 m (568 ft)). The city covers 596.71 square kilometres (230 sq mi) of five municipalities. Below Niska Banja and Nis, under the ground is a natural source of hot water, unique potential of clean and renewable geothermal energy at the surface of up to 65 square kilometers. According to some sources, the natural reservoir is at a depth of 500 to 800 meters, and the estimated capacity is about 400 million cubic meters of thermal mineral water.

=== Climate ===
Niš has a humid subtropical climate, but with continental influences. Average annual temperature in the area of Niš is 12.4 °C (54.3 °F). July is the warmest month of the year, with an average of 23.1 °C (73.6 °F). The coldest month is January, averaging at 0.9 °C (33.6 °F). The average of the annual rainfall is 613.8 mm (24.17 in). The average barometer value is 992.74 mb. On average, there are 134 days with rain and snow cover lasts for 41 days.

Average temperatures in Niš are rising and they are about 1 °C higher in last 15 years than in period from 1991 to 2020. Number of snow days and days with frost is decreasing, since January is the only month with average lows below 0 °C.

Climate data for Niš, Serbia (2010-2024)
Month	Jan	Feb	Mar	Apr	May	Jun	Jul	Aug	Sep	Oct	Nov	Dec	Year
Mean daily maximum °C (°F)	5.5 (41.9)	9.6 (49.3)	13.9 (57.0)	19.3 (66.7)	23.4 (74.1)	28.2 (82.8)	31.2 (88.2)	31.6 (88.9)	26.5 (79.7)	19.9 (67.8)	13.6 (56.5)	7.2 (45.0)	19.2 (66.6)
Daily mean °C (°F)	2.1 (35.8)	5.1 (41.2)	8.5 (47.3)	13.2 (55.8)	17.5 (63.5)	21.9 (71.4)	24.2 (75.6)	24.3 (75.7)	19.8 (67.6)	13.9 (57.0)	9.1 (48.4)	3.8 (38.8)	13.6 (56.5)
Mean daily minimum °C (°F)	−1.5 (29.3)	0.5 (32.9)	3.1 (37.6)	7.1 (44.8)	11.6 (52.9)	15.6 (60.1)	17.2 (63.0)	16.9 (62.4)	13.1 (55.6)	7.9 (46.2)	4.5 (40.1)	0.5 (32.9)	8.1 (46.6)
Average precipitation mm (inches)	59.5 (2.34)	39.3 (1.55)	54.9 (2.16)	51.0 (2.01)	68.6 (2.70)	57.4 (2.26)	50.0 (1.97)	35.1 (1.38)	36.9 (1.45)	45.7 (1.80)	58.7 (2.31)	56.3 (2.22)	613.4 (24.15)
Source: "www.weatheronline.co.uk".

Climate data for Niš (1991–2020, extremes 1940–present)
Month	Jan	Feb	Mar	Apr	May	Jun	Jul	Aug	Sep	Oct	Nov	Dec	Year
Record high °C (°F)	21.7 (71.1)	24.0 (75.2)	33.5 (92.3)	33.0 (91.4)	35.3 (95.5)	40.3 (104.5)	44.2 (111.6)	42.2 (108.0)	39.6 (103.3)	35.0 (95.0)	29.0 (84.2)	22.2 (72.0)	44.2 (111.6)
Mean daily maximum °C (°F)	5.3 (41.5)	8.3 (46.9)	13.6 (56.5)	19.0 (66.2)	23.8 (74.8)	27.9 (82.2)	30.4 (86.7)	30.9 (87.6)	25.4 (77.7)	19.5 (67.1)	13.0 (55.4)	6.3 (43.3)	18.6 (65.5)
Daily mean °C (°F)	0.9 (33.6)	3.1 (37.6)	7.5 (45.5)	12.6 (54.7)	17.2 (63.0)	21.1 (70.0)	23.1 (73.6)	23.1 (73.6)	18.0 (64.4)	12.6 (54.7)	7.4 (45.3)	2.3 (36.1)	12.4 (54.3)
Mean daily minimum °C (°F)	−2.5 (27.5)	−1.1 (30.0)	2.4 (36.3)	6.7 (44.1)	11.1 (52.0)	14.6 (58.3)	16.2 (61.2)	16.2 (61.2)	12.1 (53.8)	7.6 (45.7)	3.3 (37.9)	−0.9 (30.4)	7.1 (44.8)
Record low °C (°F)	−23.7 (−10.7)	−21.6 (−6.9)	−13.2 (8.2)	−5.6 (21.9)	−1.0 (30.2)	4.2 (39.6)	4.1 (39.4)	4.6 (40.3)	−2.2 (28.0)	−6.8 (19.8)	−14.0 (6.8)	−16.6 (2.1)	−23.7 (−10.7)
Average precipitation mm (inches)	42.9 (1.69)	39.0 (1.54)	47.6 (1.87)	55.9 (2.20)	69.8 (2.75)	57.6 (2.27)	49.4 (1.94)	43.9 (1.73)	49.0 (1.93)	55.8 (2.20)	49.0 (1.93)	53.9 (2.12)	613.8 (24.17)
Average precipitation days (≥ 0.1 mm)	13.1	12.4	12.3	12.6	13.2	10.9	9.0	7.5	9.5	9.6	10.4	13.6	134.1
Average snowy days	9.8	8.0	4.9	0.9	0.0	0.0	0.0	0.0	0.0	0.3	3.0	8.2	35.1
Average relative humidity (%)	79.1	73.3	65.3	63.0	66.0	64.6	60.6	60.3	66.8	73.5	76.5	80.3	69.1
Mean monthly sunshine hours	67.5	93.7	156.0	179.2	212.5	250.2	272.7	275.6	200.6	142.4	84.4	51.6	1,986.4
Source 1: Republic Hydrometeorological Service of Serbia
Source 2: Meteo Climat (record highs and lows)

== Demographics ==
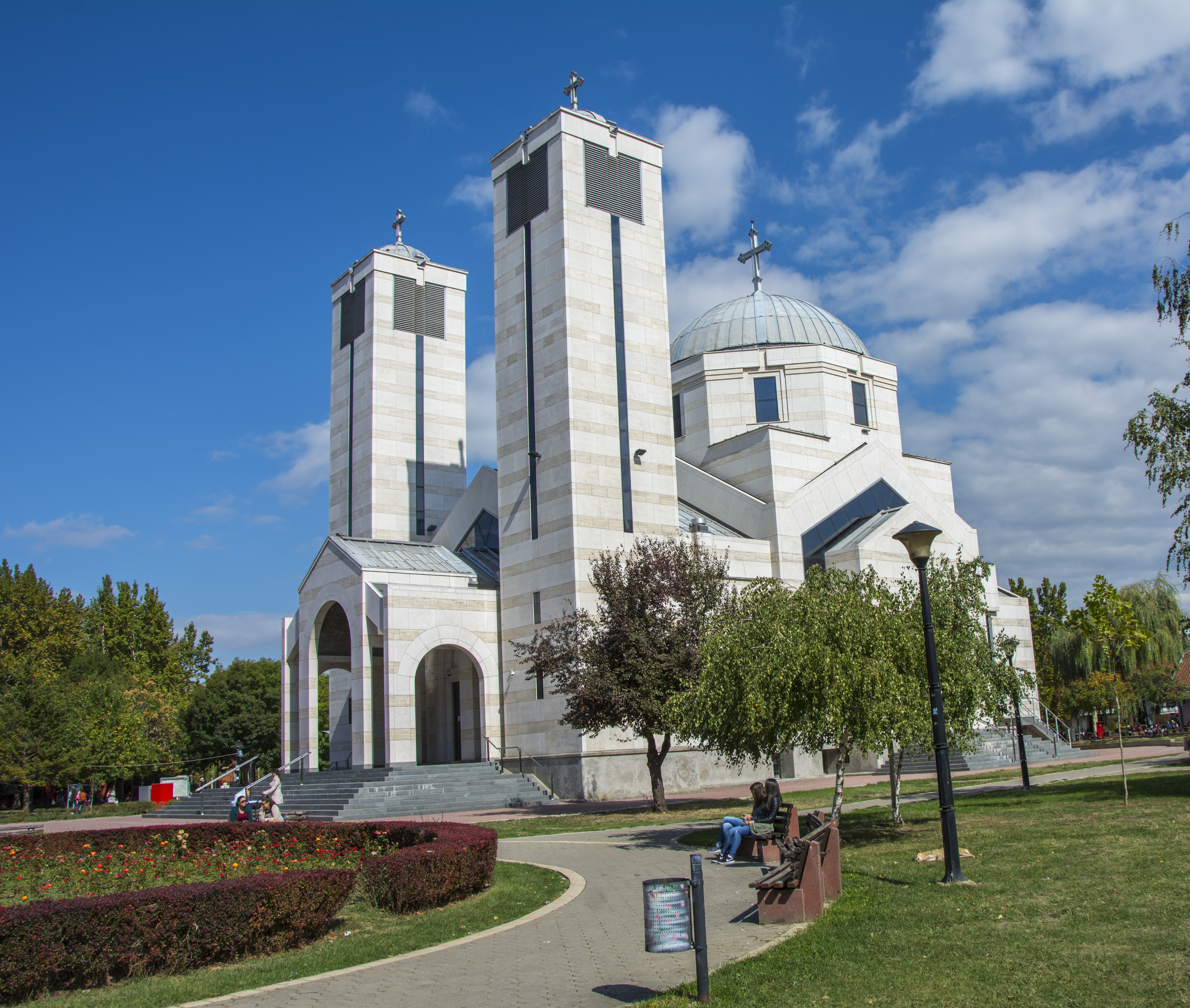
Orthodox Church of Holy Emperor Constantine and Empress Helena.

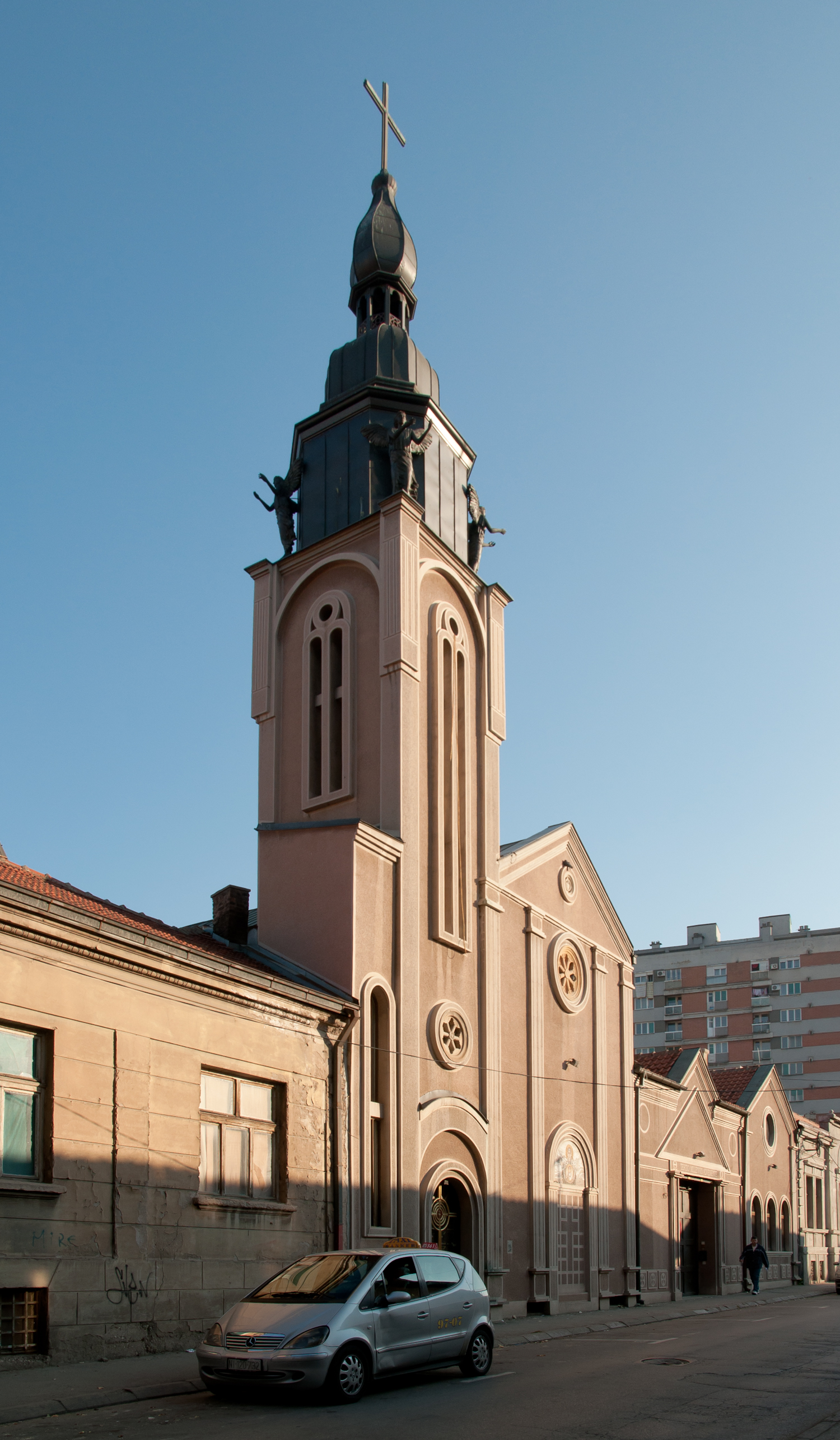
Sacred Heart Catholic Church.

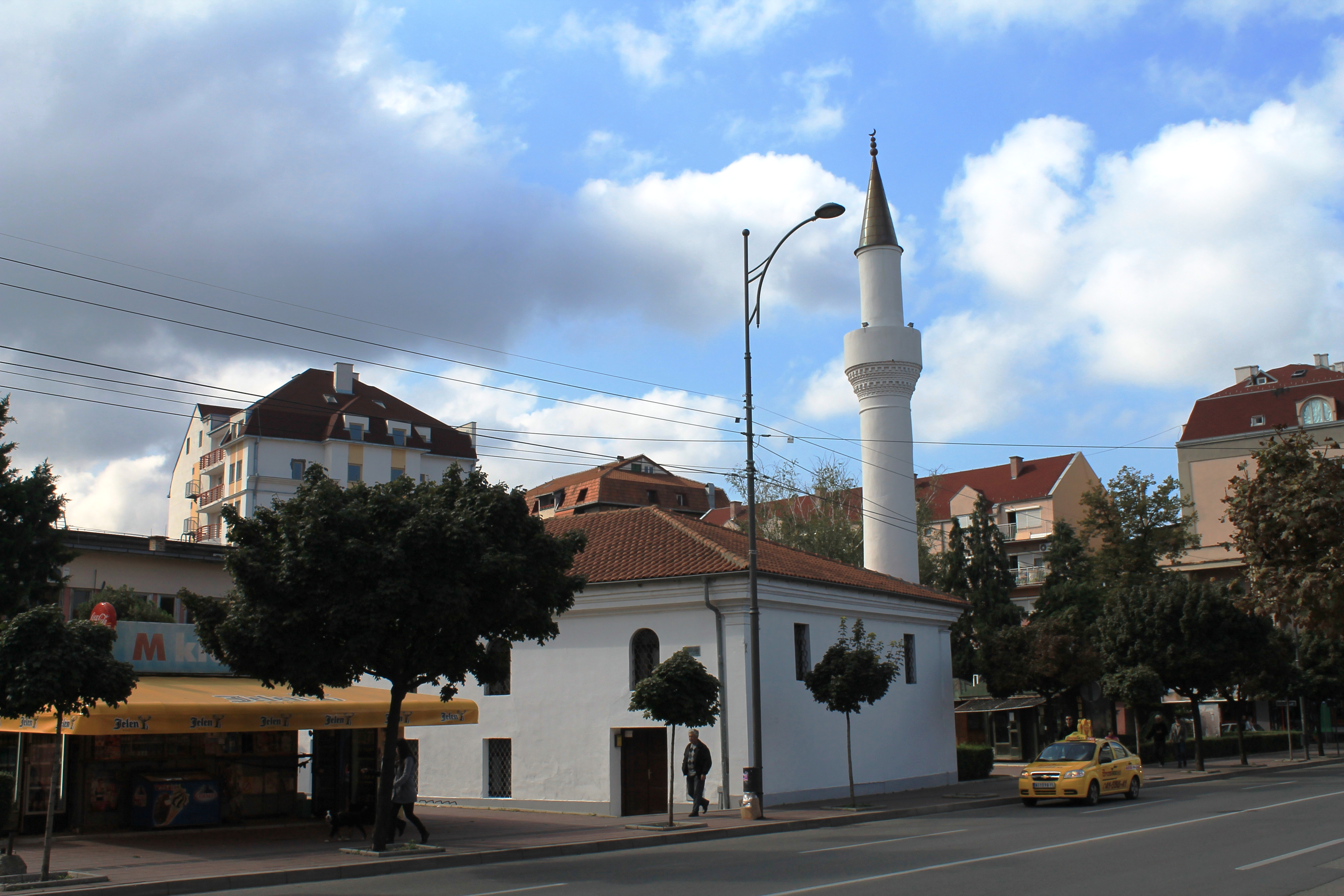
Islam-aga's Mosque.

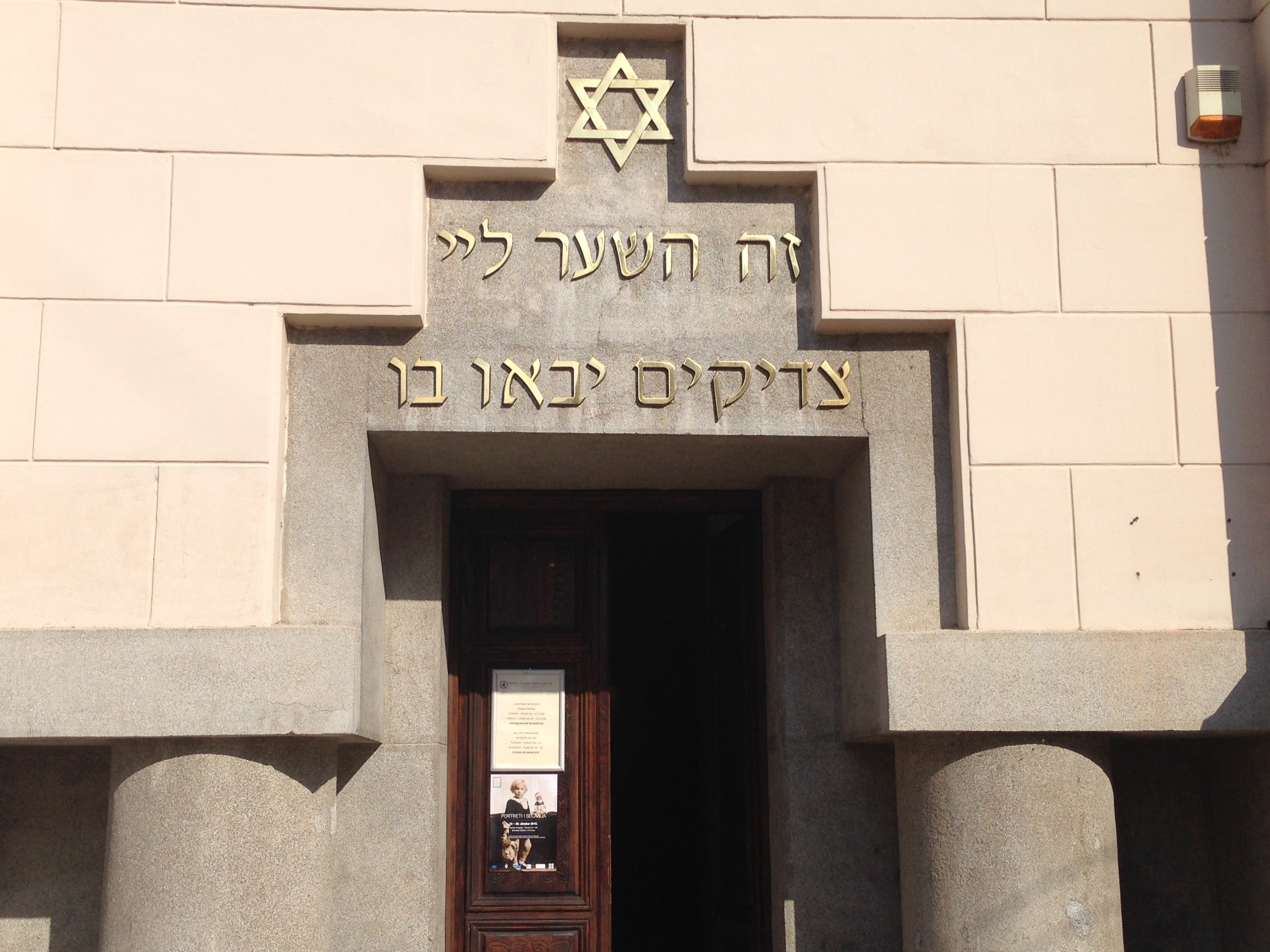
The Synagogue in Niš.

Historical population of city proper
Year	Pop.	±%
1878	12,801	—
1884	16,178	+26.4%
1890	19,877	+22.9%
1900	24,573	+23.6%
1948	47,296	+92.5%
1953	56,589	+19.6%
1961	78,712	+39.1%
1971	124,264	+57.9%
1981	157,326	+26.6%
1991	175,649	+11.6%
2002	175,631	−0.0%
2011	183,164	+4.3%
2022	178,976	−2.3%

According to the final results from the 2022 census, the population of city proper of Niš was 182,797, while its administrative area had a population of 260,237.

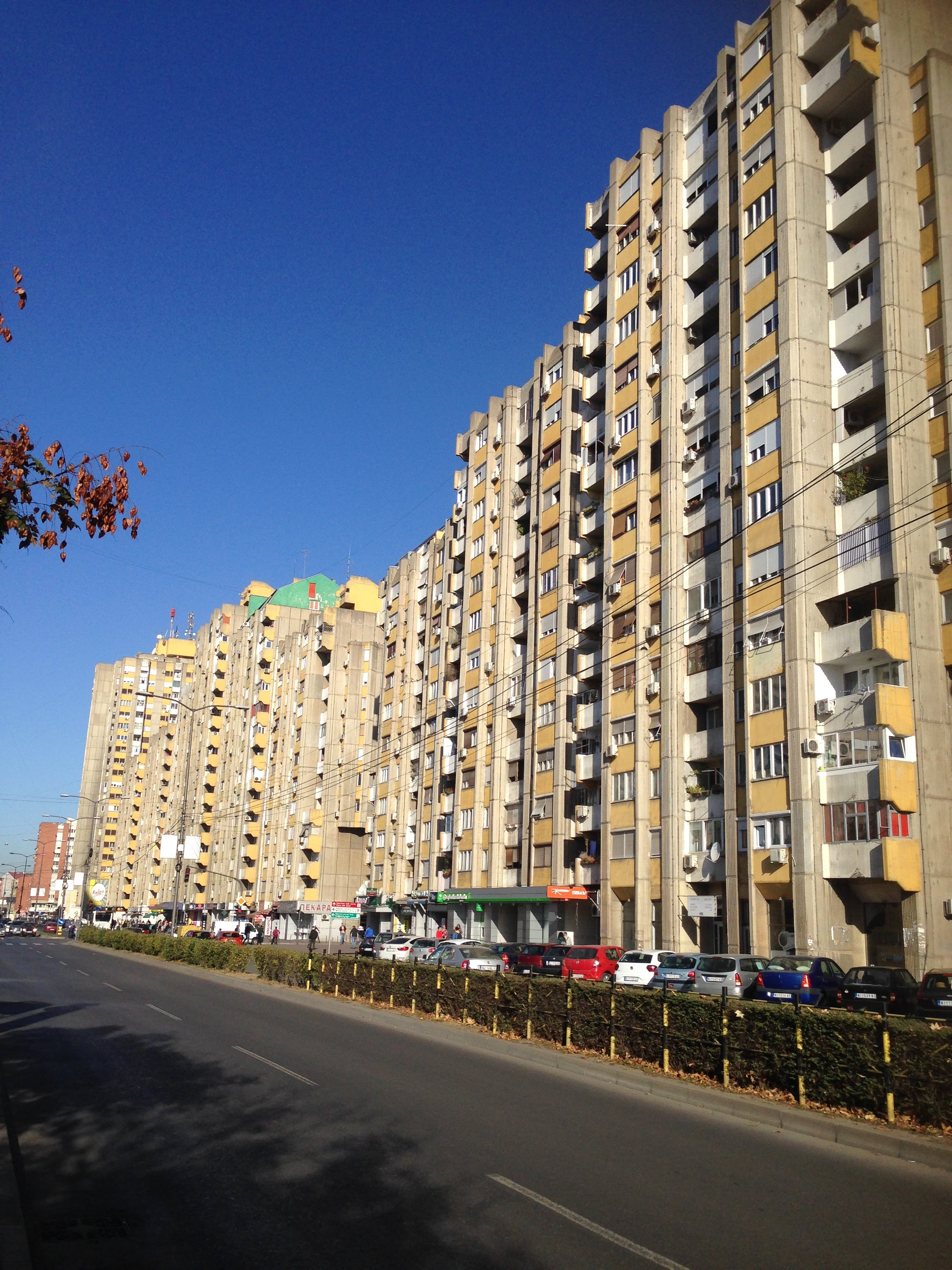
Zoran Đinđić Boulevard

The city of Niš has 87,975 households with 2,96 members on average, while the number of homes is 119,196.

Religion structure in the city of Niš is predominantly Serbian Orthodox (240,765), with minorities like Muslims (2,486), Catholics (809), Protestants (258), Atheists (109) and others. Most of the population speaks Serbian language (249,949).

The composition of population by sex and average age:

- Male – 126,645 (40.90 years) and
- Female – 133,592 (42.81 years).

A total of 120,562 citizens (older than 15 years) have secondary education (53.81%), while the 51,471 citizens have higher education (23.0%). Of those with higher education, 34,409 (15.4%) have university education.

=== Ethnic composition ===
The ethnic composition of the city of Niš:

Demographics of Niš
Ethnic group	City	Urban
Serbs	243,381	174,225
Romani	6,996	5,490
Montenegrins	659	579
Bulgarians	927	741
Yugoslavs	202	202
Croats	398	344
Others	7,674	1,963
Total	260,237	183,544

== Administrative divisions ==
The city of Niš consists of five municipalities. The first four municipalities are in the urban area of Niš, while Niška Banja is a suburban municipality. Before 2002, the city of Niš had only two municipalities, one of them named "Niš" and another named "Niška Banja". The city of Niš includes further neighborhoods:
Medijana	Palilula	Pantelej	Crveni Krst	Niška Banja
Center	Palilula	Pantelej	Crveni Krst	Niška Banja
Marger	Staro Groblje	Jagodin Mala (partly)	Beograd Mala	Nikola Tesla (broj 6)
Trg Kralja Aleksandra	Crni put	Durlan	Jagodin Mala (partly)	Jelašnica
Kičevo	Bubanj	Komren (partly)	Komren (mostly)	Sićevo
Čair	Ledena Stena	Čalije	Šljaka	Ostrovica
Bulevar Nemanjića	Suvi Do	Somborski bulevar	Medoševac	Prva Kutina
Bulevar Djindjica	Apelovac	Vrežina	Ratko Jović	Radikina Bara
Medijana	Kovanluk	Branko Bjegović	Stevan Sindjelić	Prosek
Trošarina	Tutunović Podrum	Podvinik		Čukljenik
Duvanište	Kalač Brdo	Beverli Hils		Donja and Gornja Studena
Brzi Brod	Gabrovačka reka			

== Economy ==
The city of Niš is the administrative, industrial, commercial, financial and cultural center of the south-eastern part of Republic of Serbia. The position of Niš is strategically important, at the intersection of European highway and railway networks connecting Europe with Asia. Niš is easily accessible, having an airport – Niš Constantine the Great Airport and being a point of intersection of numerous railroad and highway lines.

It is in Niš that the trunk road running from the north down the Morava River valley forks into two major lines:

- the south one, leading to Thessalonica and Athens, along the Vardar River valley,
- and the east one, running along the Nišava and the Marica, leading towards Sofia and Istanbul, and further on, towards the Near East.

These roads have been widely known from ancient times, because they represented the beaten tracks along which peoples, goods and armies moved. Known as 'Via Militaris' in Roman and Byzantine periods, or 'Constantinople road' in Middle Ages, these roads still represent major European traffic arteries. Niš thus stands at a point of intersection of the roads connecting Asia Minor to Europe, and the Black Sea to the Mediterranean. Nis had been a relatively developed city in the former Yugoslavia. In 1981, its GDP per capita was 110% of the Yugoslav average.

As of September 2017, Niš has one of 14 free economic zones established in Serbia.

Economic preview

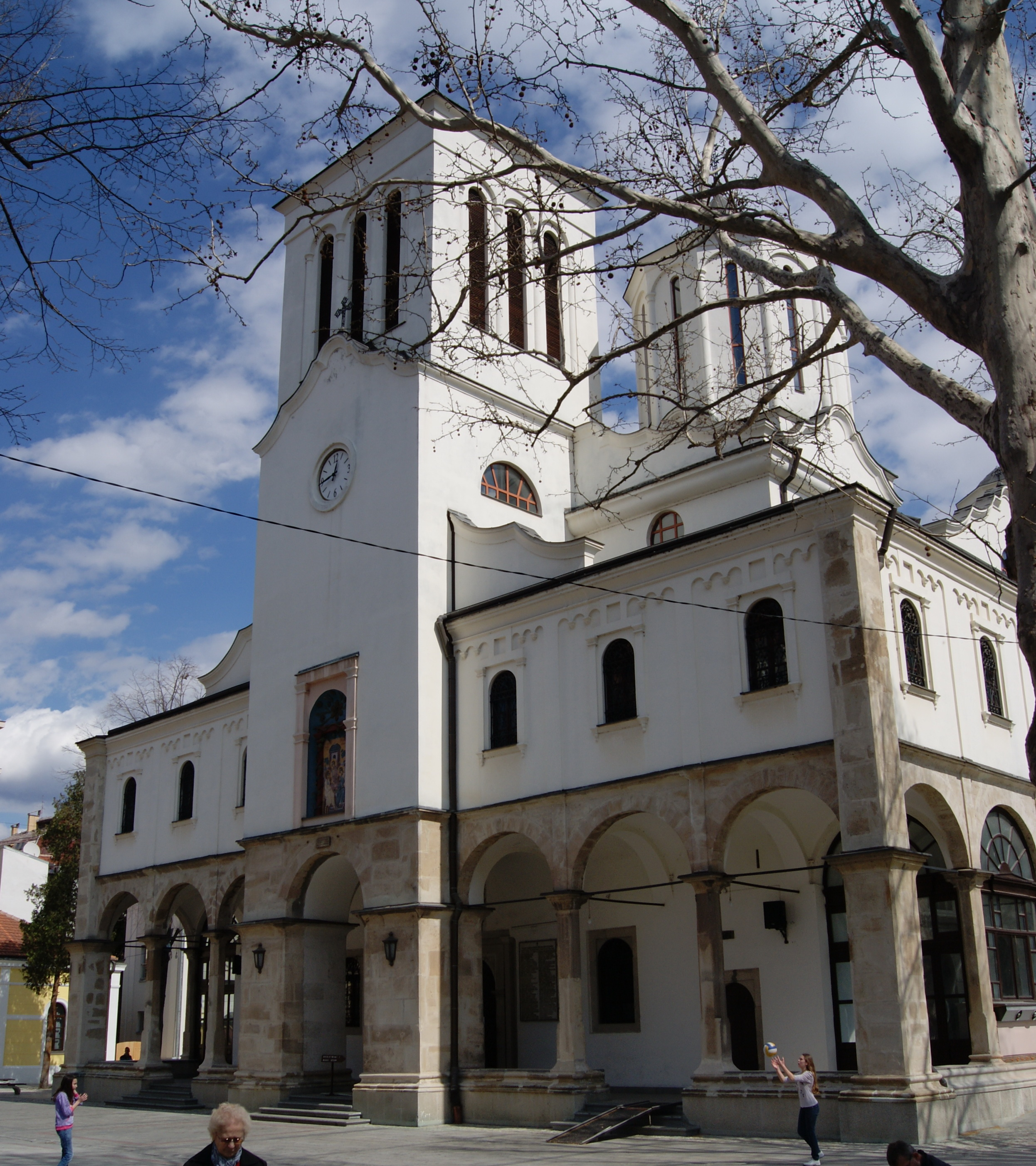
Holy Trinity Cathedral

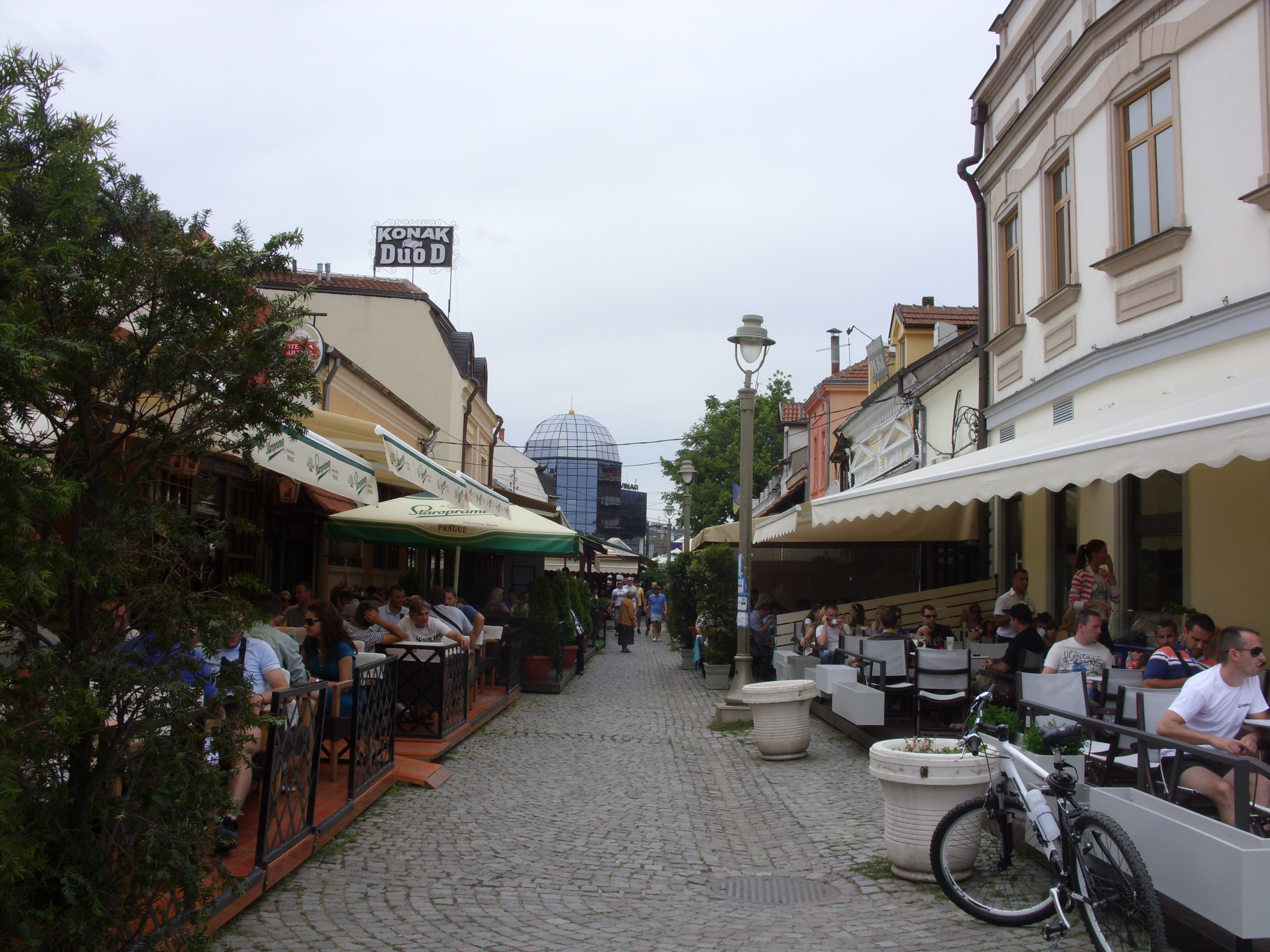
Tinkers Alley, old urban downtown built in the first half of the 18th century.

The following table gives a preview of total number of registered people employed in legal entities per their core activity (as of 2022):

Activity	Total
Agriculture, forestry and fishing	184
Mining and quarrying	44
Manufacturing	23,556
Electricity, gas, steam and air conditioning supply	977
Water supply; sewerage, waste management and remediation activities	2,149
Construction	3,394
Wholesale and retail trade, repair of motor vehicles and motorcycles	14,604
Transportation and storage	5,183
Accommodation and food services	3,560
Information and communication	4,992
Financial and insurance activities	1,539
Real estate activities	319
Professional, scientific and technical activities	4,286
Administrative and support service activities	2,393
Public administration and defense; compulsory social security	3,974
Education	7,478
Human health and social work activities	7,993
Arts, entertainment and recreation	1,382
Other service activities	1,714
Individual agricultural workers	65
Total	89,785

=== Companies ===
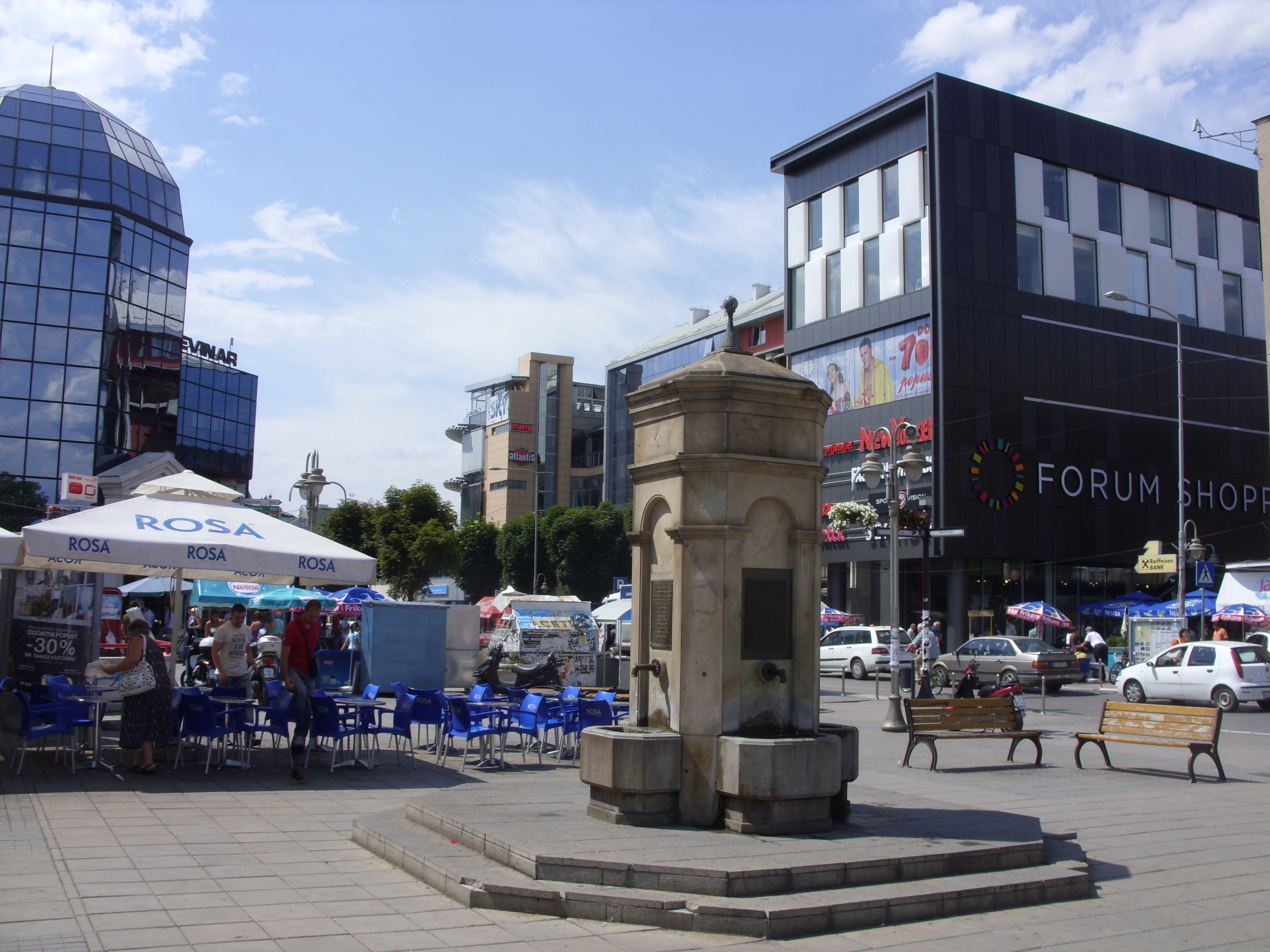
Niš Forum shopping centre

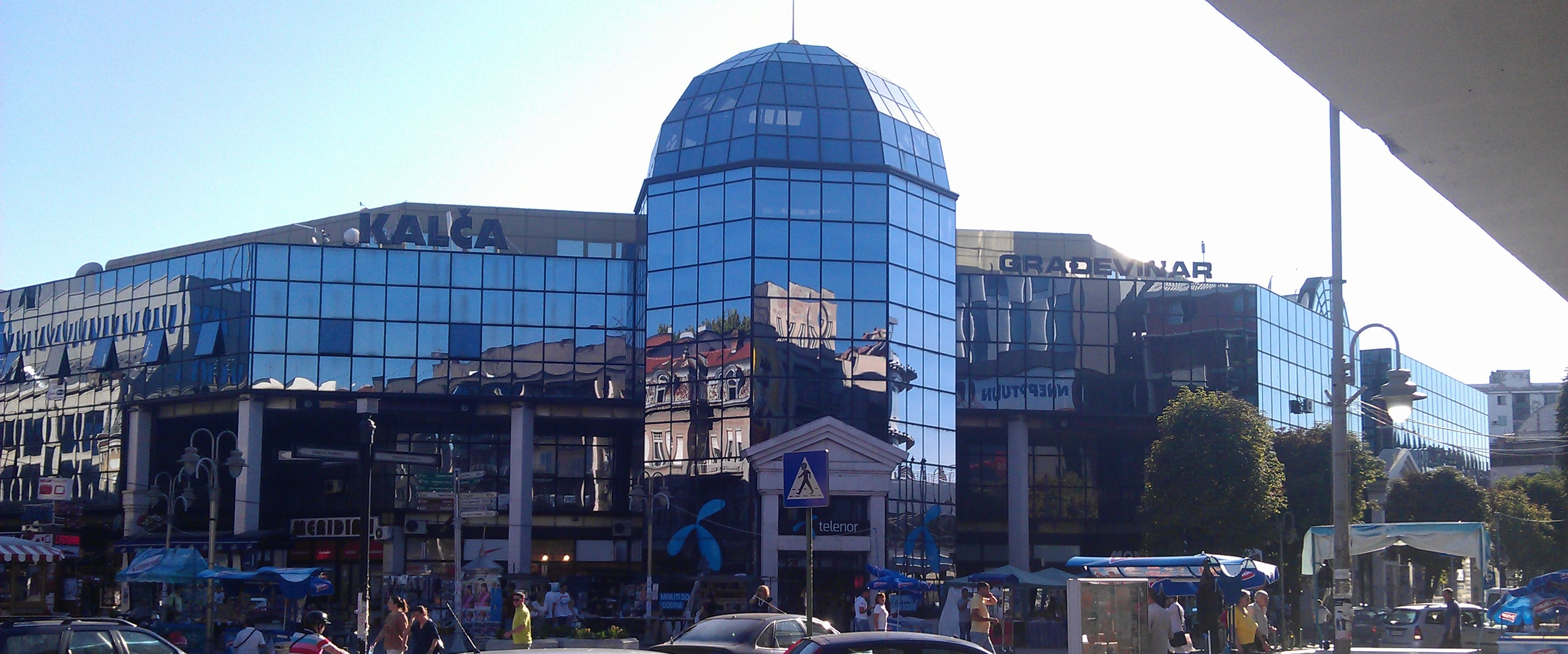
Business center Kalča

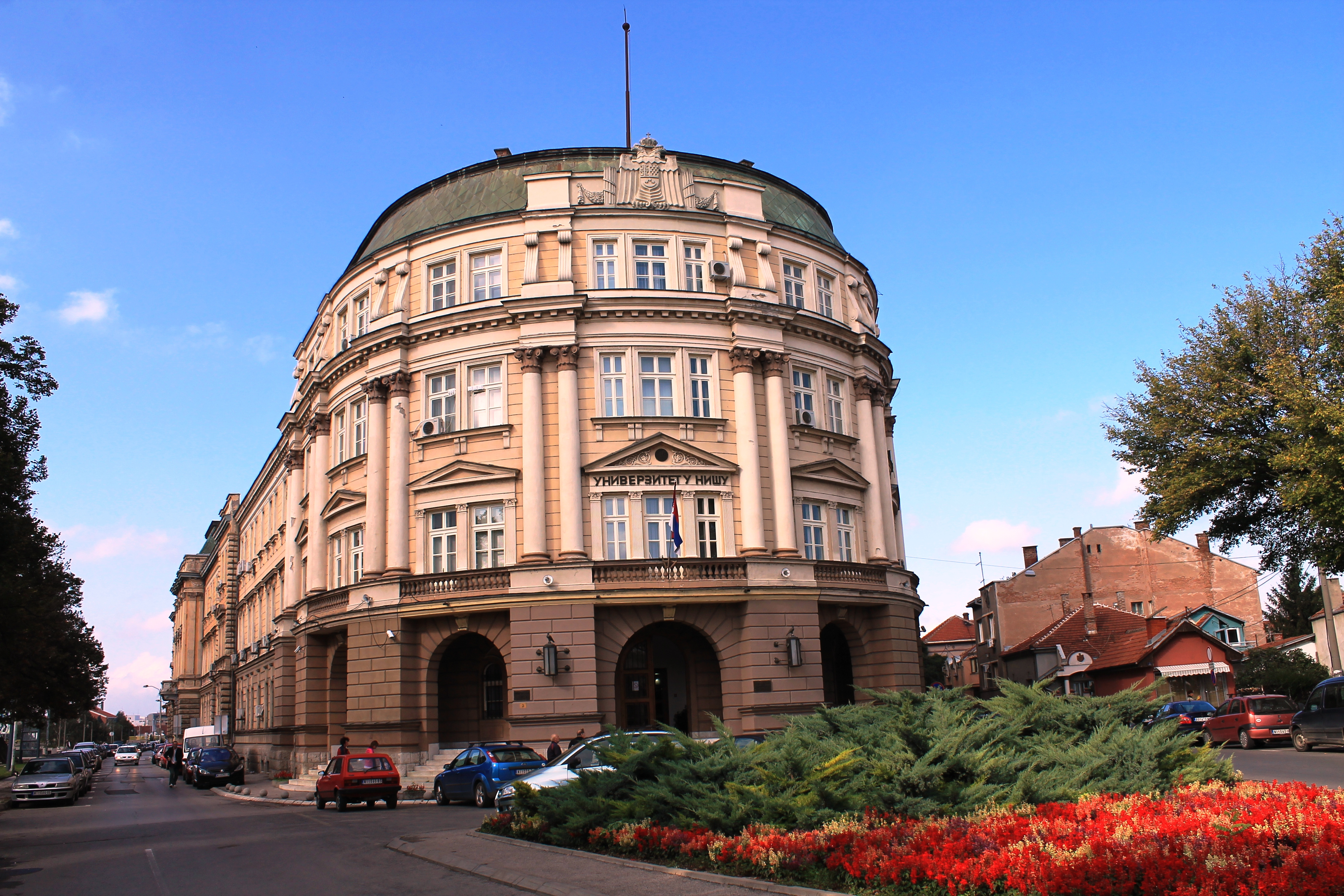
University of Niš

Niš is one of the most important industrial centers in Serbia, well known for its tobacco, electronics, construction, mechanical-engineering, textile, nonferrous-metal, food-processing and rubber-goods industries.

Among the manufacturing companies which had a huge impact during the second half of the 20th century on Niš's development are: EI Niš (electronics industry), Mechanical Industry Niš, "Građevinar" (construction company), Niš Tobacco Factory, "Nitex – Niš" (textile industry), "Niš Brewery" (beverages) and "Žitopek" (bakery). Other prominent companies which went bankrupt during the 1990s and 2000s are: "Vulkan" (rubber-goods manufacturer), "NISSAL" (nonferrous-metal industry).

Prominent tobacco manufacturer "Niš Tobacco Factory" was sold to Philip Morris in August 2003 for 518 million euros, while Nitex was sold to Benetton Group. In recent years, Integrated Micro-Electronics, Inc., Yura Corporation, Zumtobel Group, Johnson Electric and Shinwon opened their plants in Niš. Currently, Chinese manufacturer, Xingyu Automotive Lighting Systems, is building its factory.

In former Electronic and Mechanical Industry complexes, many smaller manufacturers opened their plants.

In 2019, companies with highest operating income were Philip Morris International, with over 190,000,000 Euros and Johnson Electric with over 140,000,000 Euros.

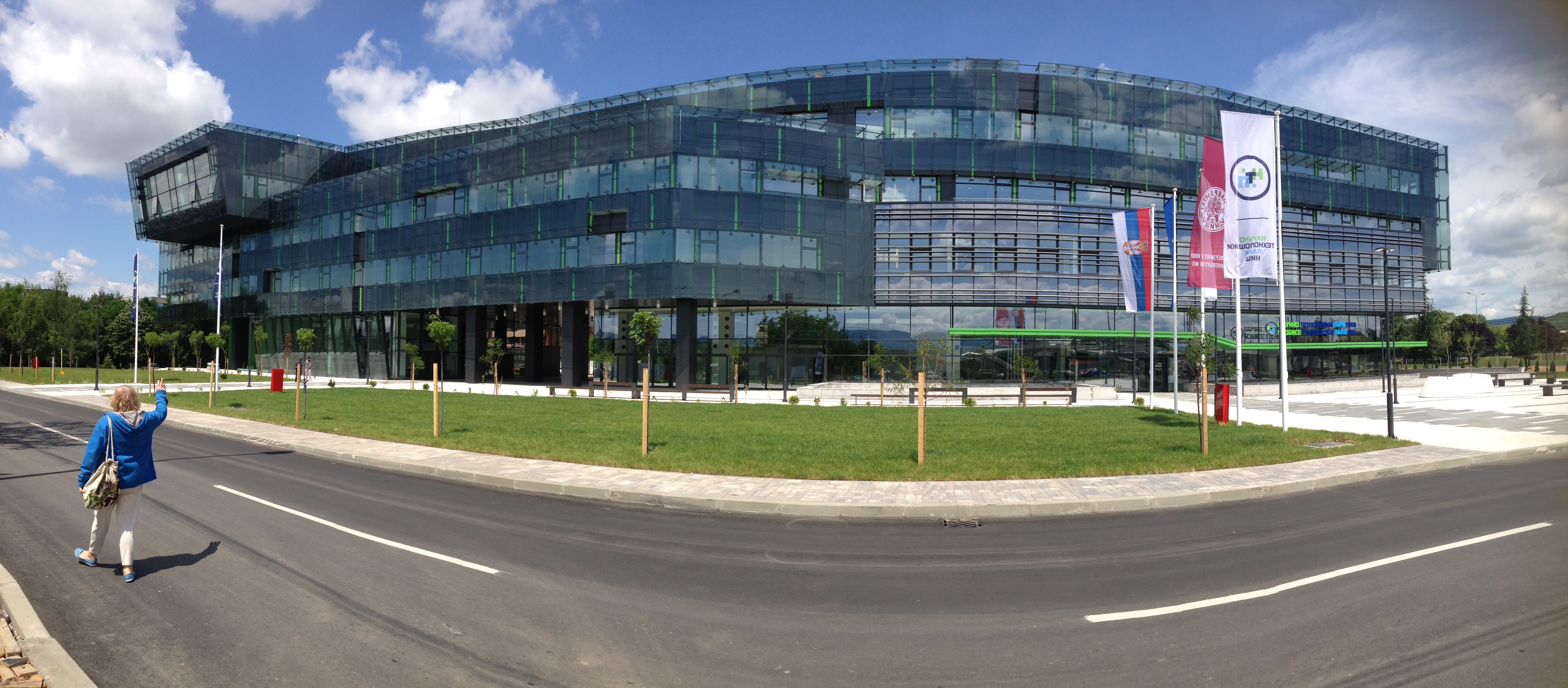
Science and Technology Park

== Transportation ==
Niš is strategically between the Morava river valley in North and the Vardar river valley in the south, on the main route between Greece and Central Europe. In the Niš area, this major transportation and communication route is linked with the natural corridor formed by the Nišava river valley, which runs Eastwards in the direction of Sofia and Istanbul. The city has been a passing station for the Orient Express.

The first highways date back to the 1950s when Niš was linked with capital Belgrade through the Brotherhood and Unity Highway, the first in Southeastern Europe.

Historically, because of its location, the city had always great importance in the region. The first to take advantage of it was the Roman Empire that built the important road Via Militaris, linking the city with Singidunum (current Belgrade) to the North and Constantinople (current Istanbul) to the southeast. Nowadays, the city is connected by the highway E75 with Belgrade and Central Europe in north, and Skopje, Thessaloniki and Athens in the south. The road E80 connects Niš with Sofia, Istanbul towards the Middle East, and Pristina, Montenegro and the Adriatic Sea to the West. The road E771 connects the city with Zaječar, Kladovo and Drobeta-Turnu Severin in Romania.

The city is also a major regional railway junction linking Serbia to Sofia and Istanbul.

The Niš Constantine the Great Airport is the second most important airport in Serbia. The first airfield serving the city of Niš was established in 1910, near the village of Donje Međurovo. In the 1930s then-national airline company Aeroput used the airport for civil service. In 1935 Aeroput included a stop in Niš in its route linking Belgrade with Skoplje.

The city public transportation consists nowadays of 13 bus lines. A tram system existed in Niš between 1930 and 1958. Niš Bus Station is the city's largest and main bus station which offers both local urban and intercity transport to international destinations. The largest intercity bus carrier based in the city is Niš-Ekspres, which operates to various cities and villages in Serbia, Montenegro, and Bosnia and Herzegovina.

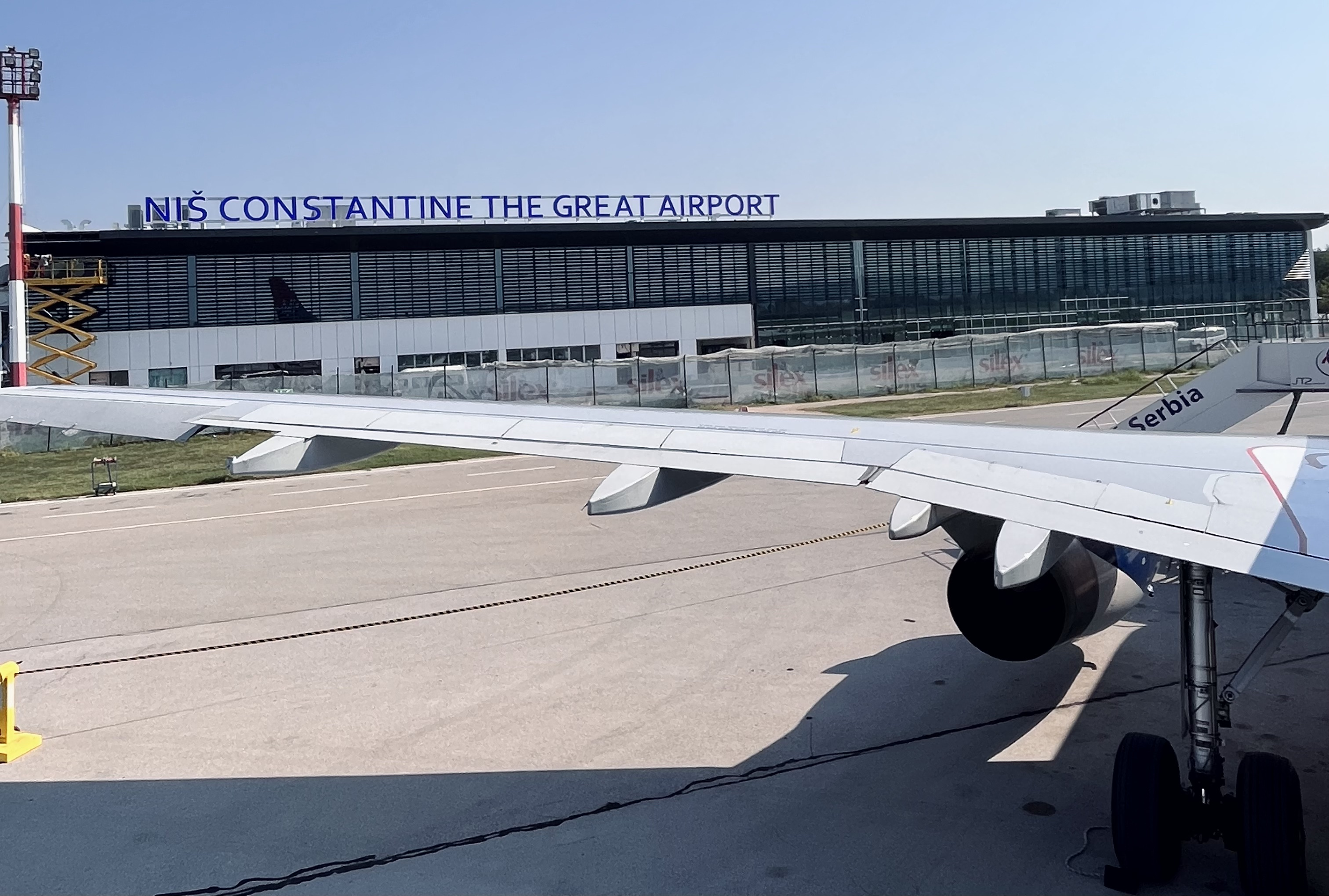
Niš Constantine the Great Airport

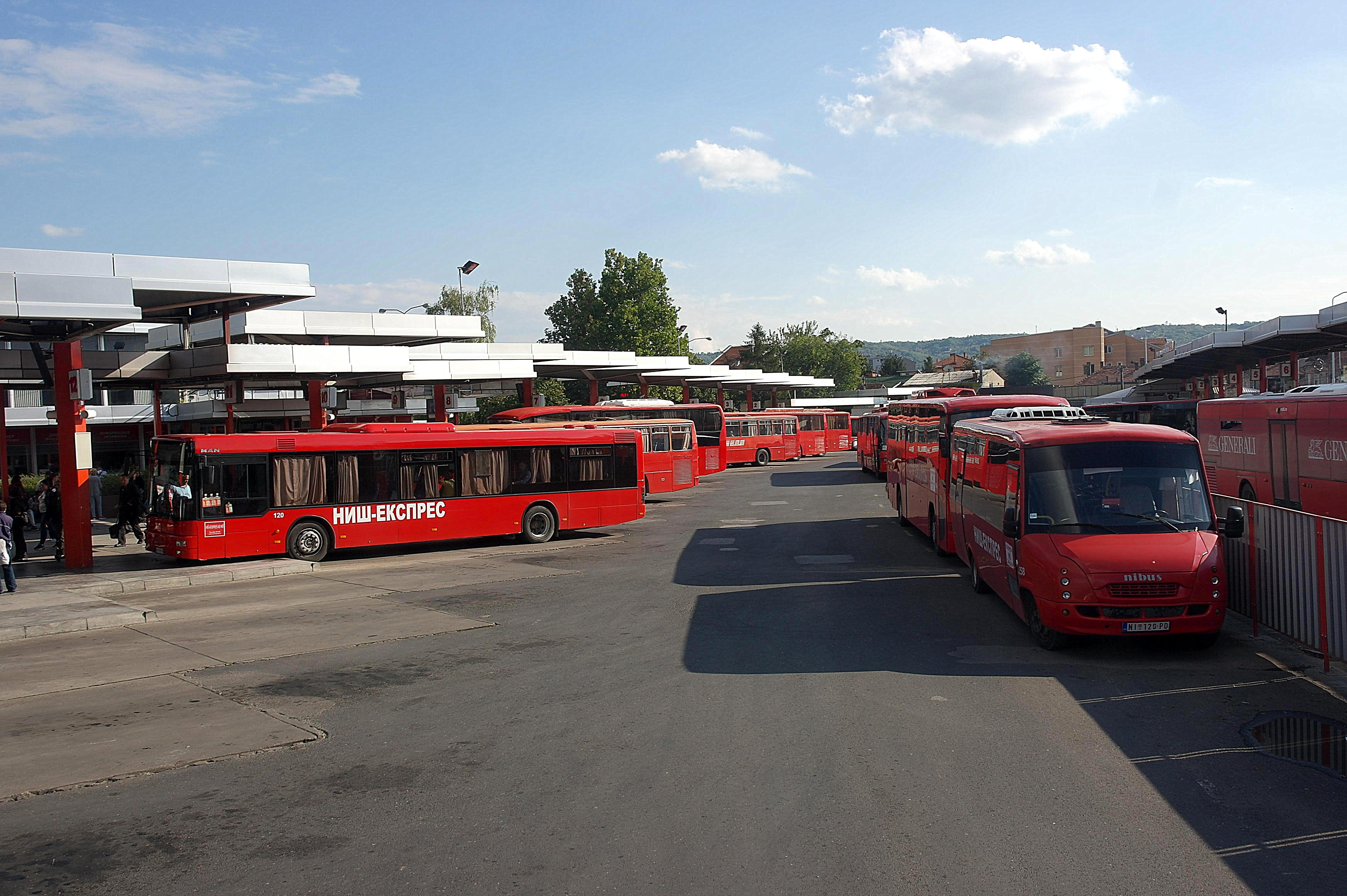
Central Bus Station

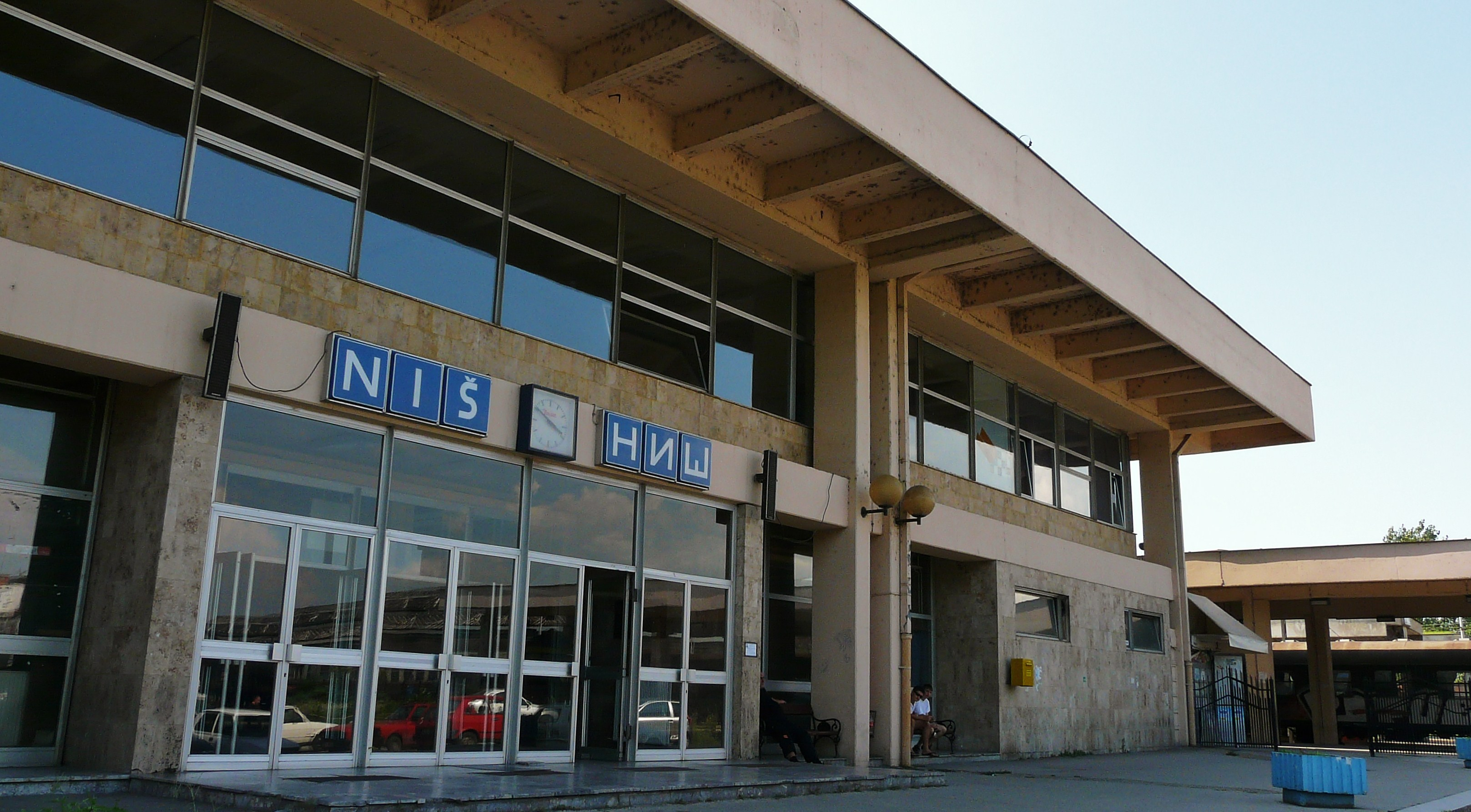
Main Railway Station

== Culture ==
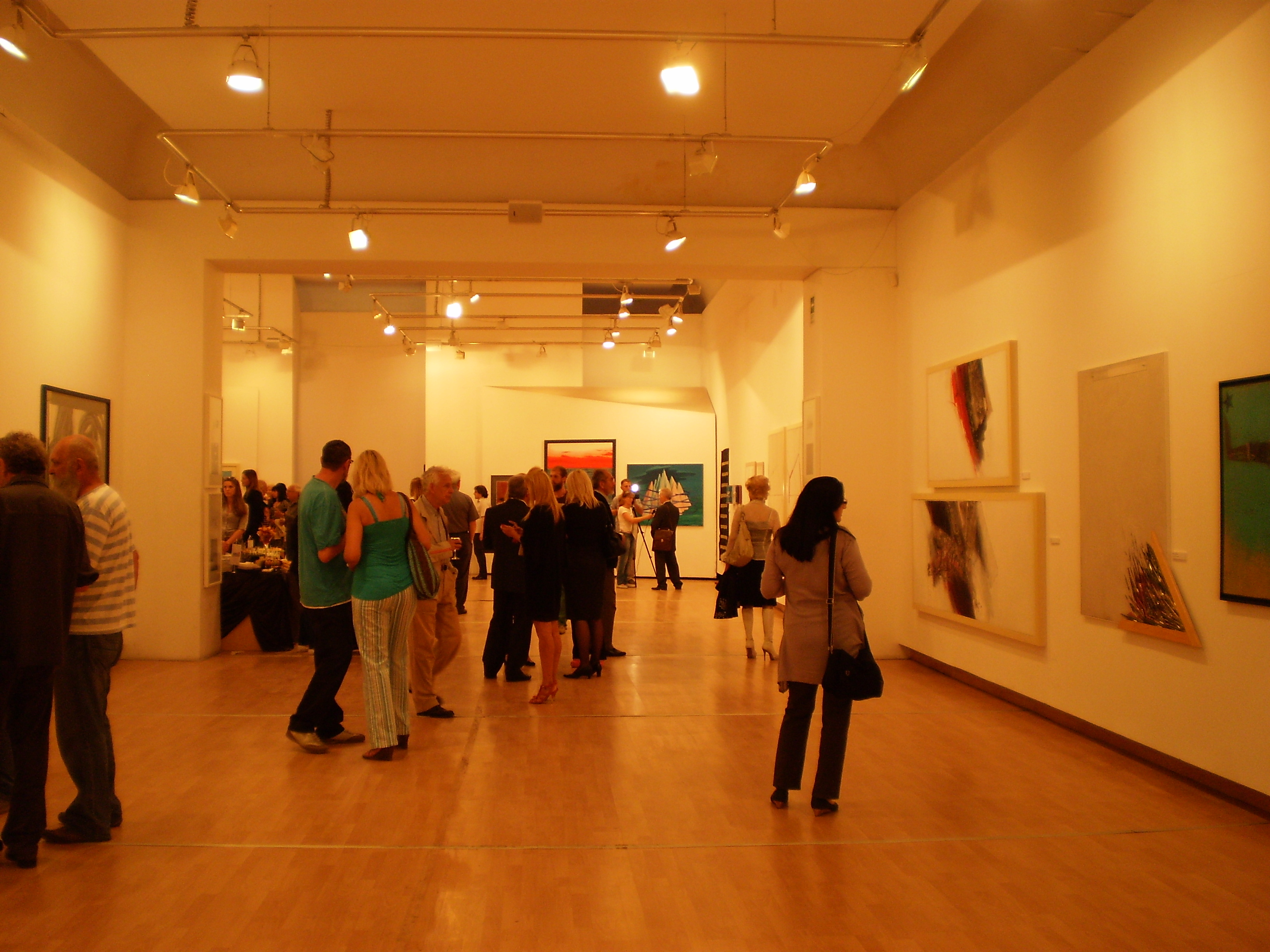
Gallery of Contemporary Fine Arts

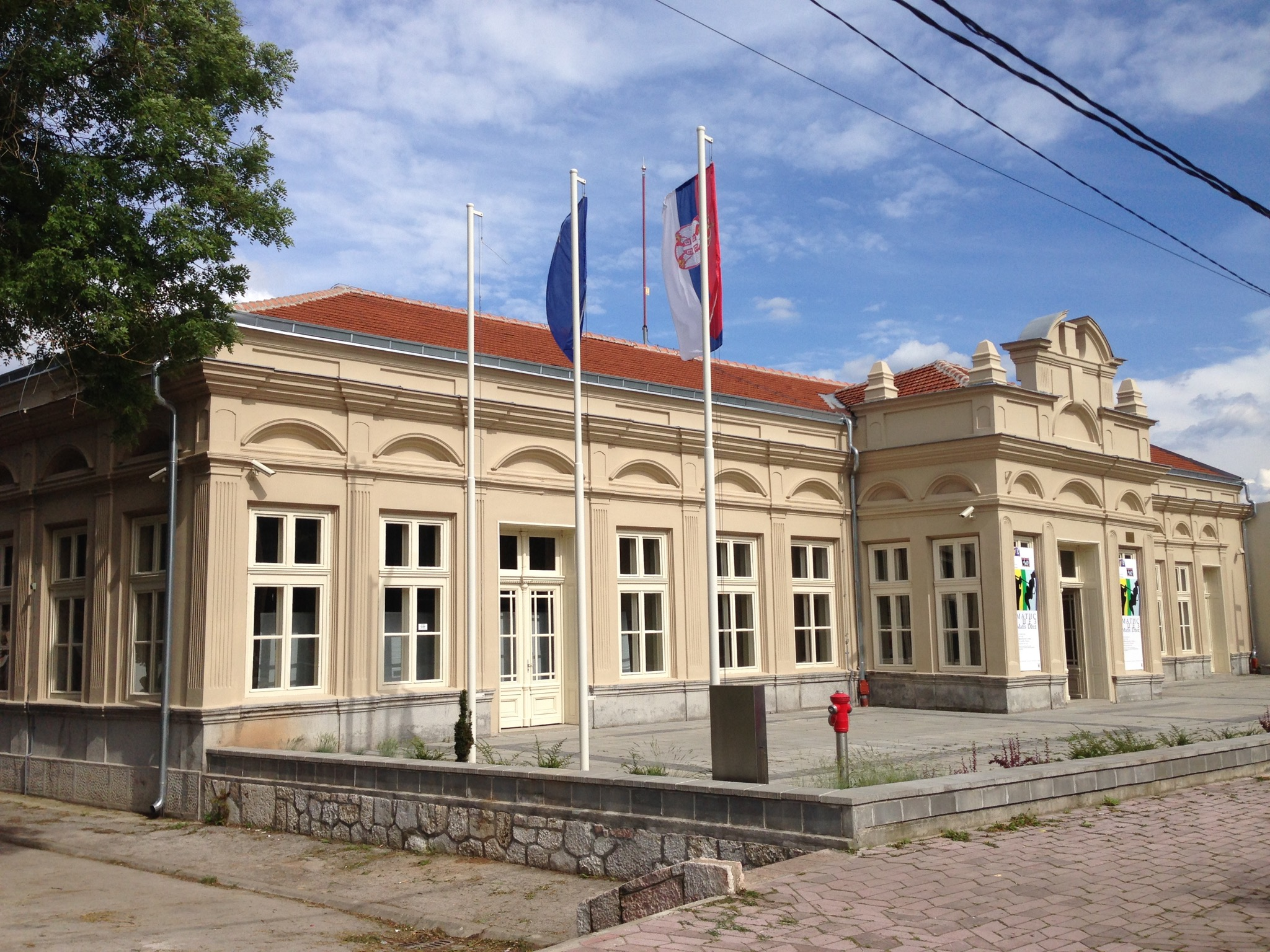
Officers' Club Exhibition Space

=== Theatre ===
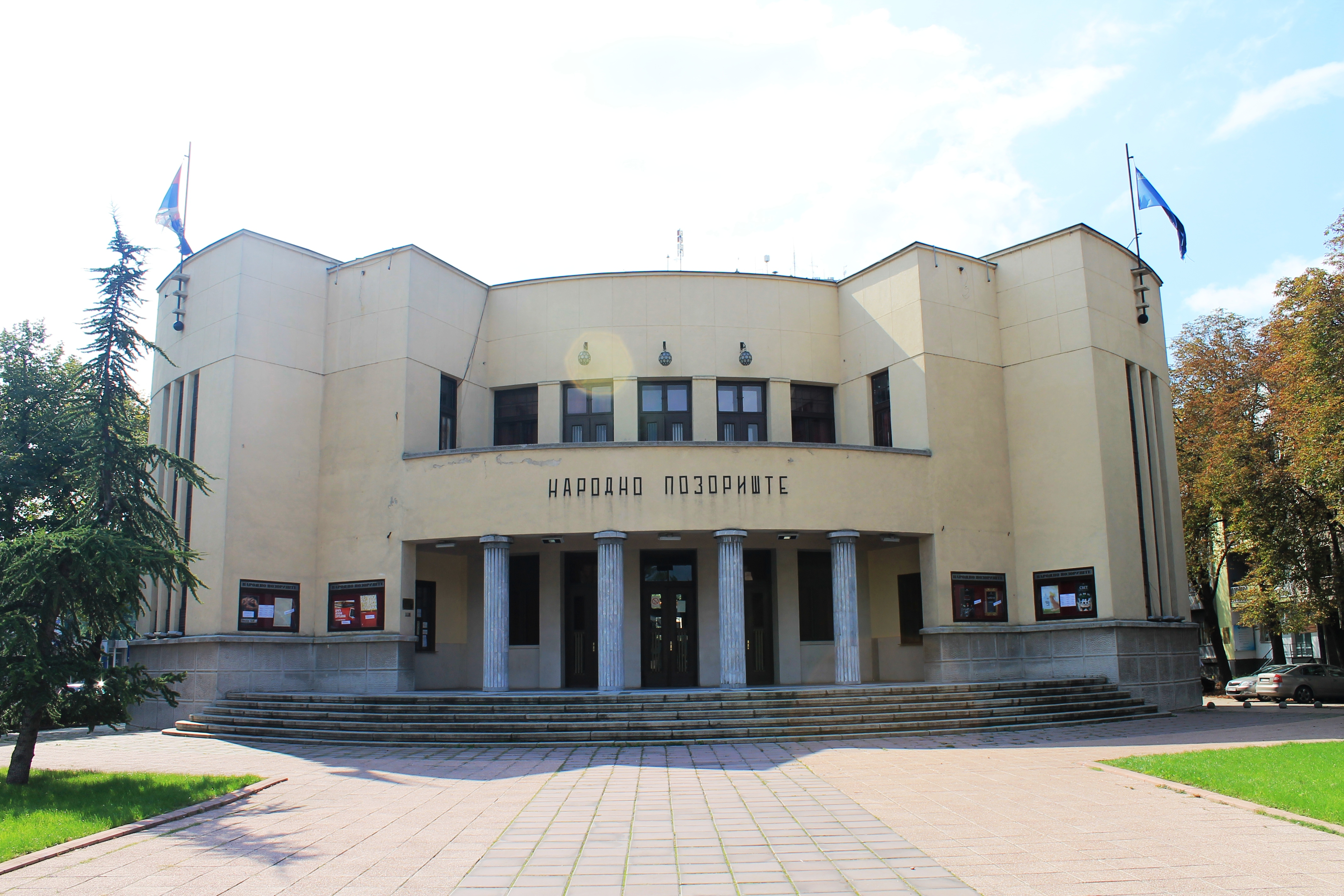
National Theatre in Niš.

Niš is a home of the National Theatre in Niš, that was founded as "Sinđelić" Theatre in 1889.

=== Literature ===
Niš has a rich literary tradition and is home to several notable writers and poets. Among them, the best known is Branko Miljković, a major figure of modern Serbian poetry. The city is also represented through the work of the Society of Writers and Literary Translators of Niš, of which Miljković was a member. The Association contributes to the development of the local literary scene through public programs, awards, and collaborations with cultural institutions.

Additionally, the city hosts the International literary colony Sićevo (also known as the Sićevo Literary Panel), a significant annual event established in 1991 that gathers prominent Serbian and international writers in the historic village of Sićevo.

=== Music ===
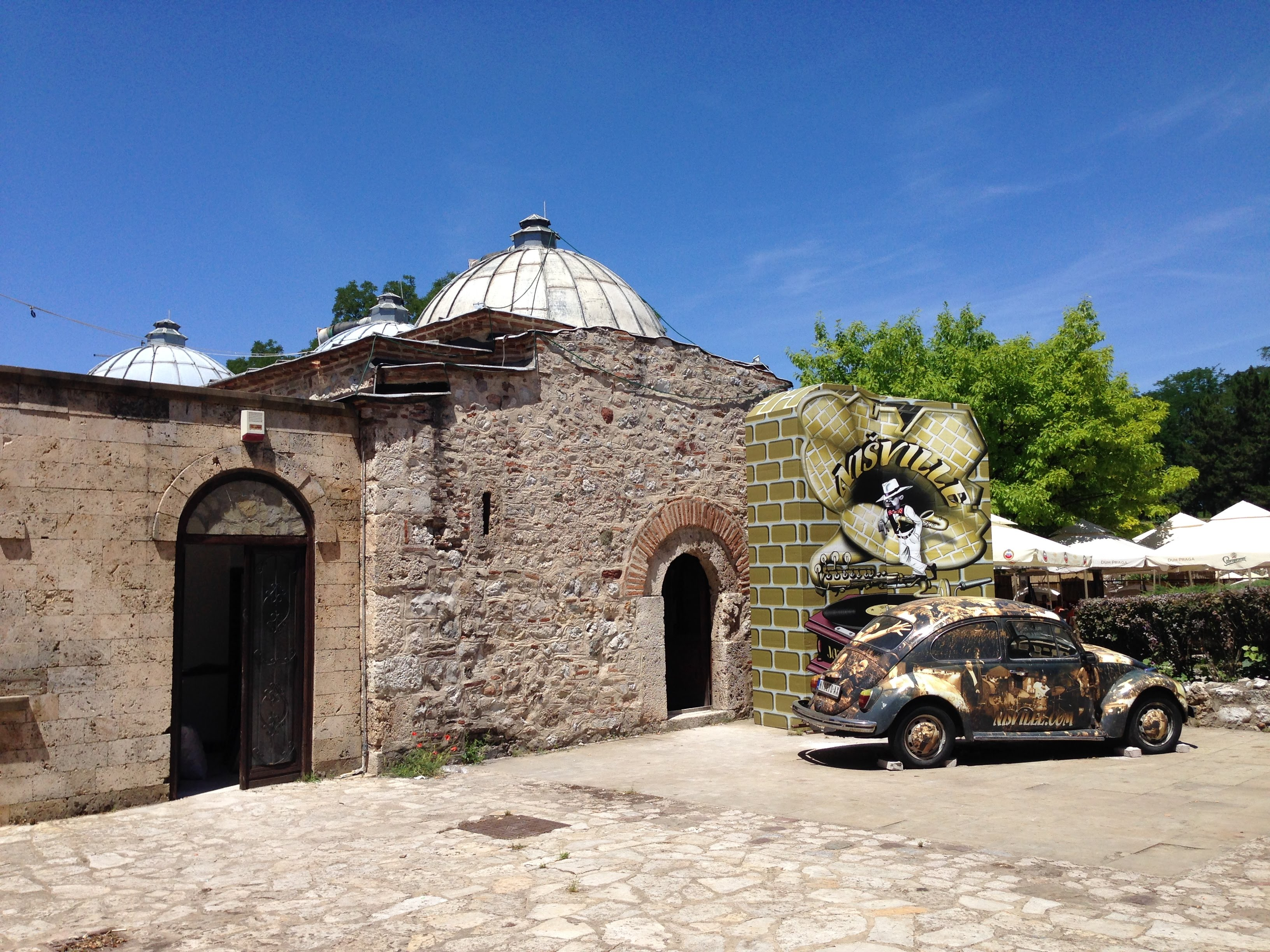
Nisville Jazz Museum

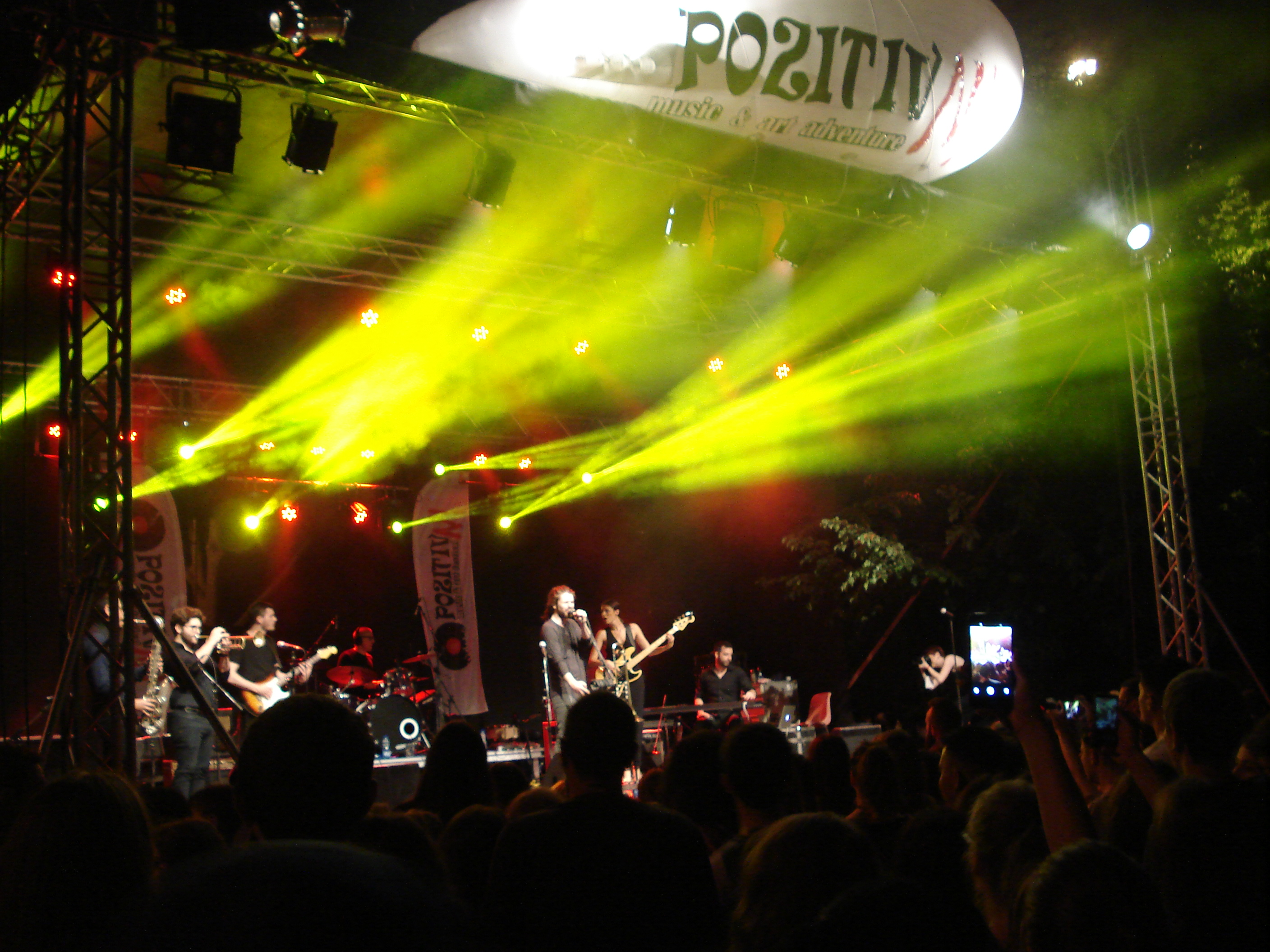
Positive Festival

From 1981 Niš is the host of Nišville International Jazz music festival which begins in mid-August and lasts for 4 days. Rock bands Galija and Kerber and jazz group Eyot are considered the most notable music bands to have originated from Niš. Other notable Niš music acts include rock bands Daltoni, Lutajuća Srca, Mama Rock, Dobri Isak, Trivalia and Novembar, ethnic music group Hazari, and others.

== Tourism ==
=== Tourist sites ===
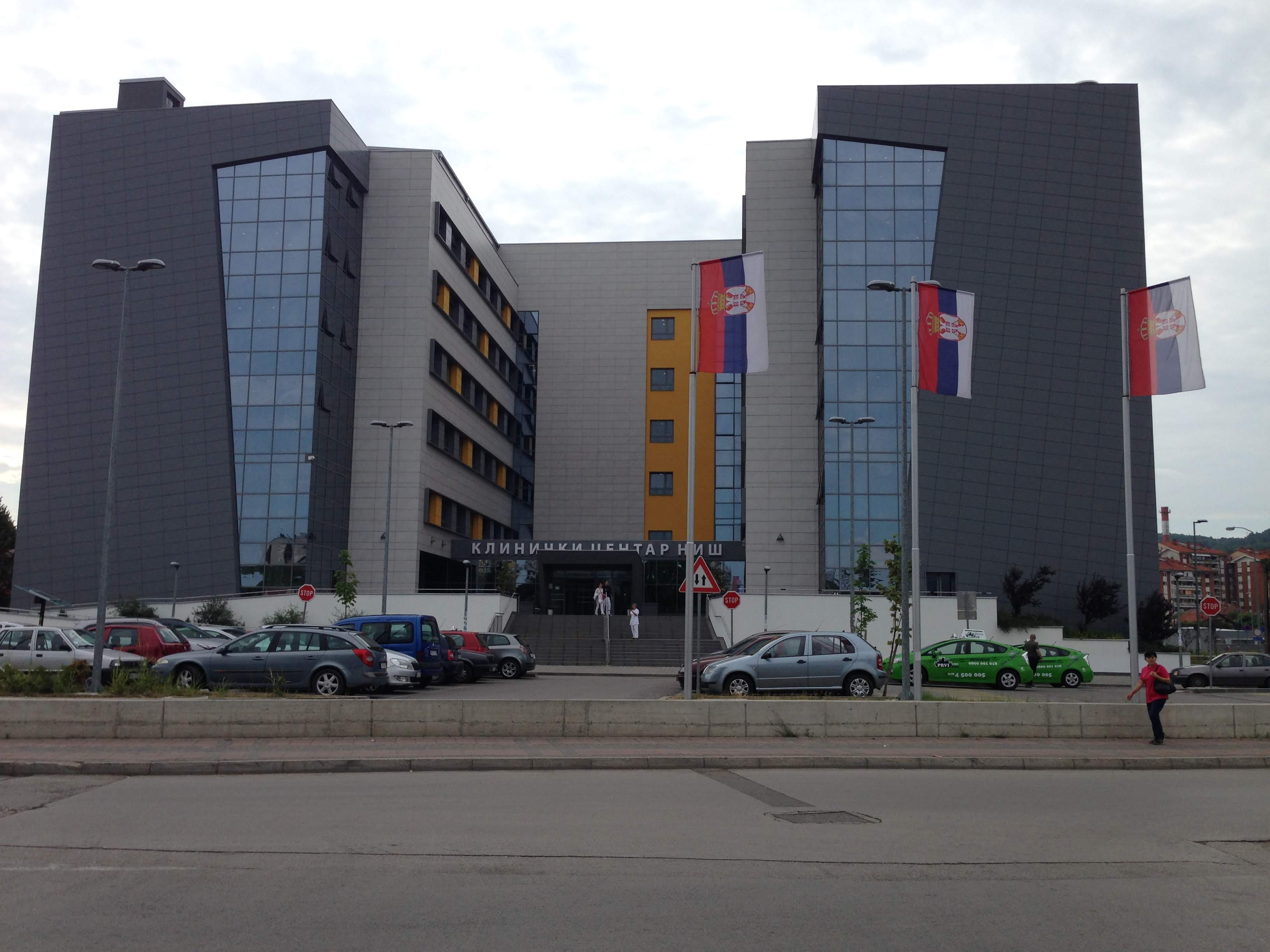
New part of Clinical Centre of Niš.

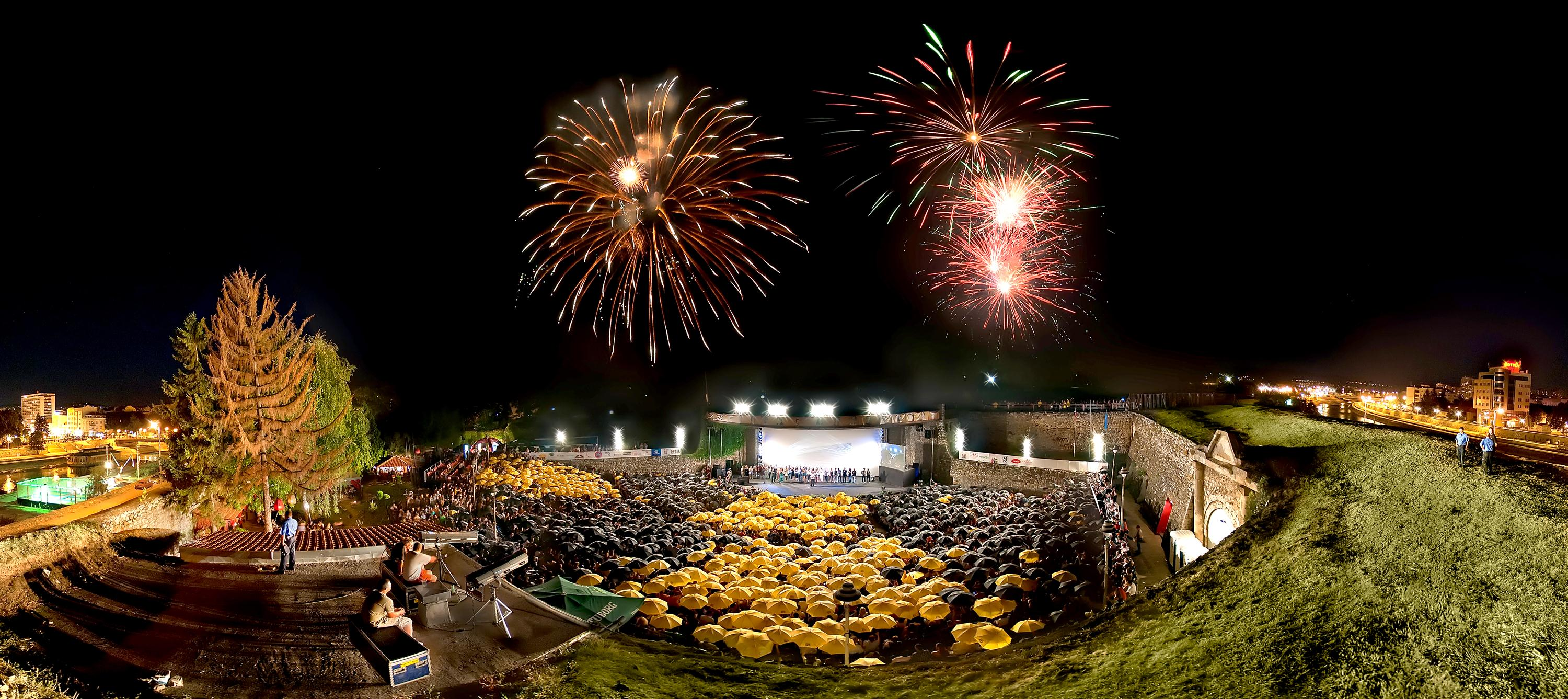
The Film Festival – a Festival of Serbian Actors held since 1966.

- Čegar – The place where the Battle of Čegar took place on 19 May 1809.
- Crveni Krst concentration camp – One of the few preserved Nazi concentration camps in Europe. It is on February 12 Boulevard.
- Memorial to Constantine the Great – built in the city centre in 2013, in commemoration to Constantine the Great who was born in the city, on the anniversary of the Edict of Milan.
- Bubanj – Monument to fallen Yugoslav World War II fighters, forming the shape of three clenched fists. The place where 10,000 civilian hostages from Niš and south Serbia were brutally murdered by German Nazis.
- Kalča, City passage and Gorča – Trade centers situated in Milana Obrenovića Street.
- Memorial Chapel in the memory of NATO bombing victims – The chapel was built by local authorities while the monument was built by the State government in 1999. They are situated in Sumatovacka street near Niš Fortress.
- Niš Fortress – The remaining fortification was built by the Turks, and dates from the first decades of the 18th century (1719–23). It is situated in the city center.
- The fortress-cafes – They are situated near Stambol gate (the main gate of the fortress).
- Mediana – Archeological site, an Imperial villa, from the late Roman period on the road leading to Sofia, Bulgaria, near EI Nis.
- Niška Banja (Niš spa) – A very popular spa during the summer season. It is 10 km (6 mi) from city center on the road leading to Sofia, in the bottom of Suva Planina Mountain.
- Tinkers Alley – An old urban downtown zone in today's Kopitareva Street, built in the first half of the 18th century. It was a street full of tinkers and other craftsmen, but today it is packed with cafes and restaurants.
- Skull Tower (Ćele Kula) – A monument to the Serbian revolutionaries (1804–13); a tower made out of skulls of Serbian uprisers, killed and decapitated by the Ottomans. It is situated on Zoran Đinđić Boulevard, on the old Constantinople road leading to Sofia.
- Sultans Trail Long-distance hiking and biking route from Vienna to İstanbul runs through Niš.

=== Architecture and monuments ===
Buildings in Niš are constantly being built. Niš is the second city in Serbia after Belgrade by number of high-rises. The Ambassador Hotel is one of the tallest buildings in Niš, but there are also other buildings like TV5 Tower.

== Sport ==
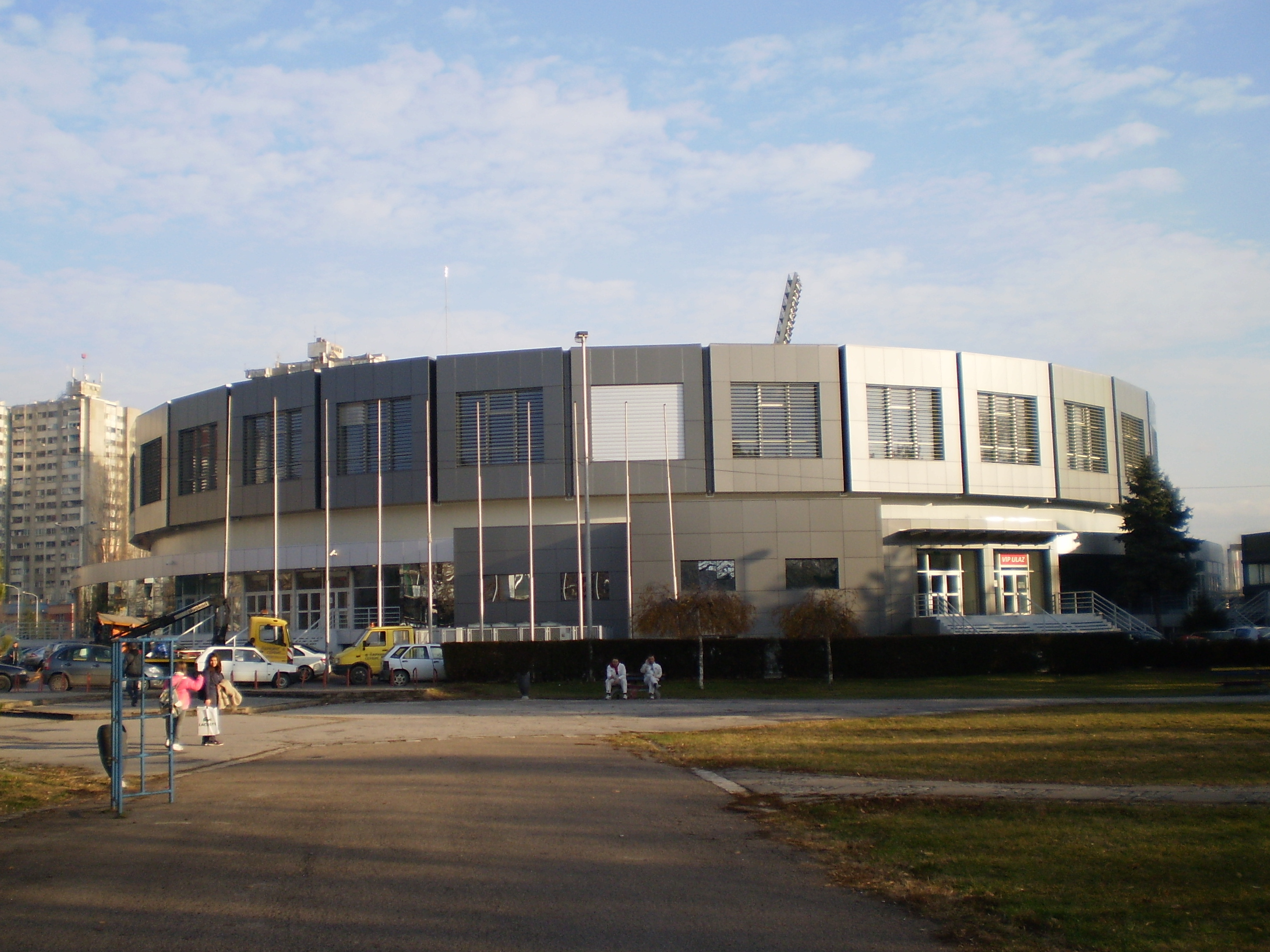
Čair Sports Center hosted the group stage of 2012 European Men's Handball Championship.

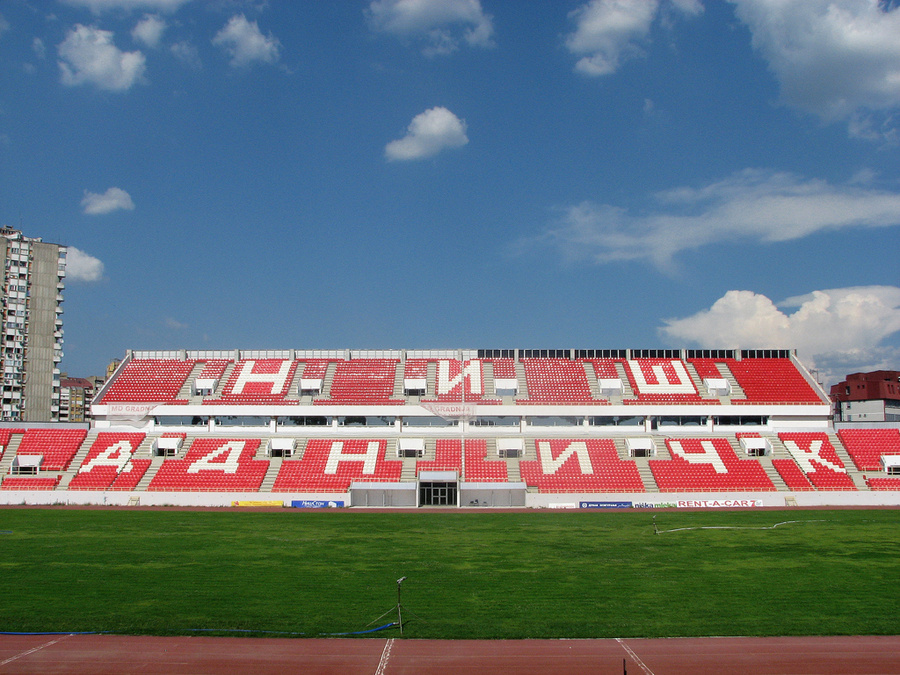
Čair Stadium

The city of Niš is home to numerous sport clubs including Radnički Niš, RK Železničar 1949, Mašinac, ŽRK Naisa, OK Niš, Mašinac, Sinđelić Niš. Football club Car Konstantin was named after Roman emperor Constantine the Great, who was born in Niš. Other football clubs are Palilulac and OFK Niš.

The biggest stadium in Niš is the Stadion Čair, which is the home of Radnički and has a total seating-capacity of 18,151 after renovations. The stadium is part of the Čair Sports Complex that also includes an indoor swimming pool and an indoor arena. Niš was one of four towns which hosting the 2012 European Men's Handball Championship.

== Notable residents ==
The people listed below were born in, residents of, or otherwise closely associated with the city of Niš, and its surrounding metropolitan area.

- Constantius I, Roman Emperor, father of Constantine I
- Constantine I, the great, (Flavius Valerius Aurelius Constantinus) – ruled 306 to 337
- Constantius III, (Flavius Constantius) – ruled 421
- Justin I, (Flavius Iustinus) – ruled 518 to 527
- Nikephoros Lykaon protospatharios c. 1050
- Stevan Sinđelić, war leader (vojvoda), died in 1809 in the Battle of Čegar.
- Stevan Sremac (1855–1906), writer, came to Niš shortly after its liberation from the Turkish rule; wrote about life in old Niš (Ivkova slava, Zona Zamfirova).
- Nikola Uzunović, (b. 1873), prime minister of Kingdom of Yugoslavia from 1926 to 1927.
- Paulina Lebl-Albala (1891-1967), feminist and professor
- Dragiša Cvetković, (1893–1969), prime minister of Kingdom of Yugoslavia from 1939 to 1941.
- Svetislav Milosavljević, (1882–1960), a Yugoslav army general and first Ban of Vrbas Banovina.
- Dušan Radović, (1922–84), journalist and writer.
- Dušan Čkrebić, (b. 1927), President(1984–1986) and Prime Minister(1978–1982) of SR Serbia.
- Spiridon, (?–1389), Patriarch of Serbian Patriarchate of Peć.
- Irinej (1930–2020), Serbian patriarch (2010–2020) and Bishop of Niš (1975–2010)
- Nadja Regin, (1931–2019), Serbian and British actress.
- Predrag Antonijević, (b. 1959), film director.
- Branko Miljković (1934–61), poet.
- Bratislav Anastasijević (1936–1992), musician, conductor
- Šaban Bajramović (1936–2008), Romani singer and composer.
- Kornelije Kovač (1942–2022), rock musician and composer.
- Radovan Lale Djuric (1945–2014), artist
- Goran Paskaljević (1947–2020), movie director; raised by his grandparents in Niš 1949–63, after the divorce of his parents.
- Dragan Pantelić (b. 1951), former football goalkeeper, president of Radnički Niš
- Eva Haljecka Petković (1870–1947), doctor.
- Predrag Miletić (b. 1952), actor.
- Miki Manojlović (b. 1950), actor.
- Zoran Živković (b. 1954), handball player and coach, Olympic champion
- Nenad Milosavljević (b. 1954), rock musician.
- Aki Rahimovski (1955–2022), rock musician.
- Biljana Krstić (b. 1959), rock and traditional music singer and songwriter.
- Ana Stanić (b. 1975), Serbian pop-rock singer
- Zoran Živković (b. 1960), politician, a former Prime Minister of Serbia.
- Zoran Ćirić (b. 1962), writer.
- Aleksandar Šoštar (b. 1964), water polo goalkeeper, Olympic, World and European champion.
- Dragan Stojković (b. 1965), football player, Olympic bronze medalist.
- Lidija Mihajlović (b. 1968), shooting champion.
- Branislava Ilić (b. 1970), playwright, screenwriter, prose writer, essayist.
- Ivan Miljković (b. 1979), volleyball player, Olympic and European champion.
- Bojana Popović (b. 1979), Montenegrin handball player, Olympic silver medalist.
- Nikola Karabatić (b. 1984), French handball player, Olympic, World and European champion.
- Nemanja Radulović (b. 1985), violinist.
- Ivan Kostic (b. 1989), footballer.
- Stefan Jović (b. 1990), basketball player, Olympic, World Cup, and EuroBasket silver medalist.
- Sava Ranđelović (b. 1993), water polo player, Olympic, World and European champion.
- Andrija Živković (b. 1996), footballer, U-20 World champion.
- Staša Gejo (b. 1997), sport climber, World and European champion.
- Nemanja Radonjić (b. 1996), footballer, Serbian champion.
- Georgios Sinas (Greek: Γεώργιος Σίνας, German: Georg Sina; 20 November 1783 – 18 May 1856) was an Austrian-Greek entrepreneur and banker. He became a national benefactor of Greece, he was born in Niš.

== Diplomatic missions ==
The city of Niš, after Belgrade, has the largest diplomatic corps in Serbia. Bulgaria has General Consulate in Niš. Until 2010, there was also a Consulate General of Greece. Diplomatic agreements were given to five prominent citizens of Niš, who acquired the title of honorary consul. The United Kingdom, Hungary, France, Slovakia and Austria have chosen Nis as their honorary consuls, appreciating their commitment and contribution to strengthening ties and cooperation in various fields with these countries.

=== General Consulates ===
  - Bulgaria
  - Turkey (to be opened, as of 2022)

=== Honorary consulates ===
  - United Kingdom
  - Hungary
  - Slovakia
  - France
  - Austria
  - Poland

== Local media ==
Online newspaper:

- Narodne novine "Народне новине" (in Serbian)
- Južne vesti (Southern news) (in Serbian)

Online radio stations:

- Internet.Radio.Magazin Super radio (in Serbian)

Radio stations:

- Baltazar radio (90.5) (renamed to Radio Jat (90.5))
- Banker radio (98.3)
- City radio (99.9)
- Radio Nišava (104.0) (in Romany)
- Radio Belle Amie (95.6)
- Radio Belle Amie Folk Kanal (98.7/100.7) (closed)
- Radio Seven (88.8)

TV stations:

- Banker TV
- TV 5 (closed)
- BelleAmie TV
- TV Nais
- RTV Nišava (in Romany)
- Čair (in Romany) (closed)
- NTV Media Niš
- Art TV
- Puls TV (closed)
- Kopernikus Televizija

== International relations ==
=== Twin towns – sister cities ===
Niš is twinned with the following cities, according to their City Hall website:

Kassandra, Greece; Sparta, Greece; Glyfada, Greece; Maroussi, Greece; Alimos, Greece; Veliko Tarnovo, Bulgaria	Košice, Slovakia; Kursk, Russia; Saltdal, Norway; Bad Homburg, Germany; Istočno Sarajevo, Bosnia and Herzegovina

=== Other forms of cooperation and city friendship ===
- Vienna, Austria
- Graz, Austria
- Barcelona, Spain
- Columbus, Ohio, United States

== See also ==
- Islam-aga's Mosque

== Bibliography ==
- Fine, John Van Antwerp (1994). The Late Medieval Balkans: A Critical Survey from the Late Twelfth Century to the Ottoman Conquest. University of Michigan Press. ISBN 978-0-47208-260-5.
- Prendergast, Eric (2017). The Origin and Spread of Locative Determiner Omission in the Balkan Linguistic Area (Ph.D). UC Berkeley.
