= History of Niš =

Niš, a city in Serbia's Nišava District, is one of the oldest cities in the Balkans and Europe, and has from ancient times been considered a gateway between the East and the West. The Paleo-Balkan Thracians inhabited the area in the Iron Age, and Triballians dwelled here prior to the Celtic invasion in 279 BC which established the Scordisci as masters of the region. Naissus was among the cities taken in the Roman conquest in 75 BC. The Romans built the Via Militaris in the 1st century, with Naissus being one of the key towns. Niš is also notable as the birthplace of Constantine the Great, the first Christian Roman Emperor and the founder of Constantinople, as well as Constantius III. It is home to one of Serbia's oldest Christian churches dating to the 4th century in the suburb of Mediana.

== Etymology ==
Niš (Serbian Cyrillic: Ниш, pronounced [nîːʃ]) was built on the ruins of Roman Naissus. The Late antiquity town was known as Naissus, Νάϊσσος, Ναϊσσός (Naissos), Naessus, urbs Naisitana, Navissus, Navissum, Ναϊσσούπολις (Naissoupolis). It originated as a hydronym (the Nišava river), either of Celtic or Paleo-Balkan linguistical origin. Niš evolved from the toponym attested in Ancient Greek as ΝΑΙΣΣΟΣ (Naissos), which achieved its present form via phonetic changes in Proto-Albanian and thereafter the placename entered Slavic. Its common antique name in historiography is Latin Naissus. In Old Serbian, the town was known as Niš (written Нишь and Ньшь).

The development of Nish < Naiss- may also represent a regional development in late antiquity Balkans which while related may not be identical with Albanian. Attempts have been made to explain the place name in various ways as "a purely Slavic development", such as by Serbian linguist Aleksandar Loma, and Austrian linguist Joachim Matzinger, who maintains the Albanian transmission of Naiss > Niš, states that "a discussion with historical South Slavic linguistics is an urgent desideratum".

== Prehistory ==
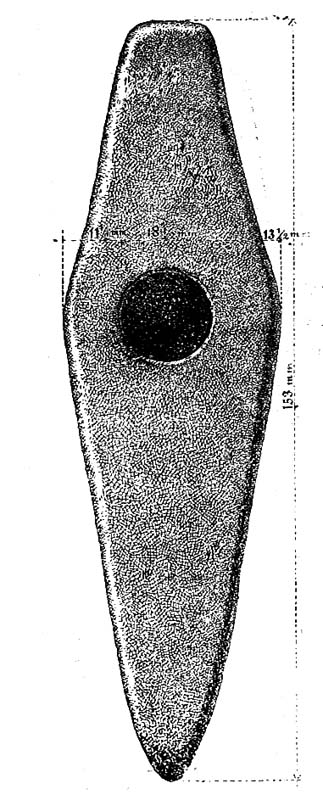
Stone mallet found in Nišava River.

Neolithic sites in the Niš area include "Čardak" in Donja Vrežina, "Velika česma" in Vrtište, "Kovanluk" in Malča, "Ciganski ključ" in Trupale, "Bubanj" in Niš, "Čivlak" in Gornja Toponica, and others. The Vinča culture which flourished in the 5th–4th millennia BC included over 18 sites in the Niš area. 31 sites in the Nišava basin are dated to the Eneolithic (3200–2000 BC). Several migrations from the Black Sea steppes into the Balkans change the ethnic picture; natives and immigrants mix and result in the formation of the first Indo-Europeans in the Balkans. The Bubanj–Hum culture is found in its early phase in Pomoravlje, but not in the Niš area, until bearers of Bubanj–Hum II connected to the late phase of the Baden culture arrive into the Nišava basin.

== Antiquity ==
The Niš area was inhabited by the Triballi, a tribe described as a specific people by ancient writers. Their ethnic affiliation is unknown, as linguistical research is inconclusive, while it is known that their territory was recognized in antiquity as Thracian, their relation to Thracians were older and stronger than that to Illyrians, and that they through history mixed with both Thracian and Illyrian elements. Scarce archaeological finds and onomastics indicate the presence of Thracian, Illyrian, Celtic and Dacian populations members in the Niš area in antiquity.

The Triballi inhabited the Great Morava valley in the 5th century BC. In 279 BC, during the Gallic invasion of the Balkans, the Scordisci tribe defeated the Triballi and settled their lands. At the time of the conquest of the Balkans by Rome in 168-75 BC, the Niš area was used as a base for operations. Naissus was first mentioned in Roman documents near the beginning of the 2nd century CE, and was considered a place worthy of note in the Geography of Ptolemy of Alexandria.

== The Roman era ==
In the early Roman period, Naissos (as Naissus) was viewed of as Dardanian territory, while onomastics show that the population was predominantly Thracian.

The Romans occupied the town in the period of the "Dardanian War" (75-73 BC), and set up a legionary camp. The city (called refugia and vici in pre-Roman relation), because of its strategic position (Thracians were based to the south) developed as an important garrison and market town of the province of Moesia Superior.

The Romans built the Via Militaris in the early 1st century AD, with Naissus being one of the key towns. Five roads met at Naissus, from Lissus, Serdica, Singidunum, Ratiaria and Thessalonica (through Scupi). A tombstone of a Cretan soldier under either Claudius (41-54) or Nero (54-68) stands in Naissus, indicating that auxiliary units were stationed here at that time. Cohort I Aurelia Dardanorum was based in the city. Legio IV Scythica and VII Claudia may have briefly been stationed here. An auxiliary fort was based to the north, at present-day Ravna, called Timacum Minus. Marcus Aurelius (161–180) promoted the city to municipia status. Overall, several family tombstones indicate that this was an important military region and by the 3rd century a social class of peasants and soldiers emerged.

At the latest, a praetorium (road-station) was established under Septimius Severus (193-211) for Imperial officials business travelling, administered by stratores of Upper Moesia.

In 268, during the "Crisis of the third century" when the Empire almost collapsed, the greatest Gothic invasion seen to date came pouring into the Balkans. The Goths' seaborne allies, the Heruli, supplied a fleet, carrying vast armies down the coast of the Black Sea where they ravaged coastal territories in Thrace and Macedonia. Other huge forces crossed the Danube in Moesia. An invasion of Goths into the province of Pannonia led to disaster. In 268, the Emperor Gallienus won some important initial victories on land and at sea, but it was his successor Claudius II who finally defeated the invaders at the Battle of Naissus in 268, one of the bloodiest battles of the 3rd century. The invaders allegedly left thirty to fifty thousand dead on the field.

Four years later in 272, the son of a military commander Constantius Chlorus and an innkeeper's daughter called Flavia Iulia Helena was born in Naissus who was destined to rule as Emperor Constantine the Great. Constantine created the Dacia mediterranea province of which Naissus was capital, which also had Naissus and Remesiana of the Via militaris and the towns of Pautalia and Germania. He lived at Naissus in short periods from 316 to 322.

The Roman Emperor Julian the Apostate (360-363) resided in Naissus briefly in 361, prior to becoming the sole Augustus. A fabricae that produced ingots (Gold bars) was active in Naissus at the time of Theodosius I (378-395) as findings with the marking of NAISI made on the order of the Emperor have been found in Romania, dating to 379.

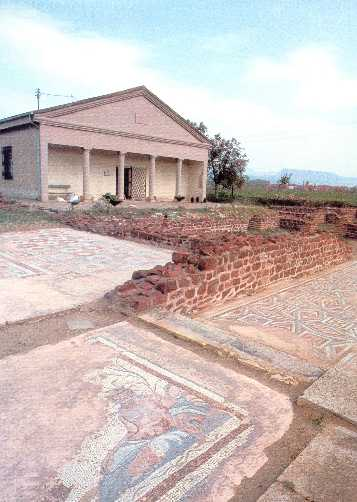
Mosaics in Mediana

The 4th-century Imperial villa at Mediana is an important archaeological site located close to Niš. Mosaic floors and other traces of luxury are preserved in the archaeological museum on the site. Other aristocratic suburban villas are clustered nearby. Historians think that city of Naissus could have had 150,000 citizens. Here in Mediana, in 364, emperors Valentinian and Valens divided the Roman empire and ruled as co-emperors.

When we arrived at Naissus we found the city deserted, as though it had been sacked; only a few sick persons lay in the churches. We halted at a short distance from the river, in an open space, for all the ground adjacent to the bank was full of the bones of men slain in war. --Priscus on Naissus in 448 A.D.

Though the emperor Julian strengthened the walls, the very prosperity of Naissus made it a target and it was destroyed by Attila in 443. Attila the Hun conquered Naissus by using battering rams and mobile siege towers—military sophistication that was new in the Hun repertory. After the Huns captured the city of Naissus they massacred the inhabitants of the city. Years later, river banks outside the city were still covered with human bones as a reminder of the devastation the Huns had inflicted. Priscus said "When we arrived at Naissus we found the city deserted, as though it had been sacked; only a few sick persons lay in the churches. We halted at a short distance from the river, in an open space, for all the ground adjacent to the bank was full of the bones of men slain in war." The founder of the Justinian Dynasty, Justin I, was born in Naissus in 450, and his nephew Justinian I did his best to restore the city, but Naissus never recovered its 4th century urbanity. The Roman fort at Balajnac with a well-preserved cistern produced coins for Justinian I.

Justinian established the Archbishopric of Justiniana Prima which the town and its bishopric became part of, Procopius mentioned it as Naissopolis.

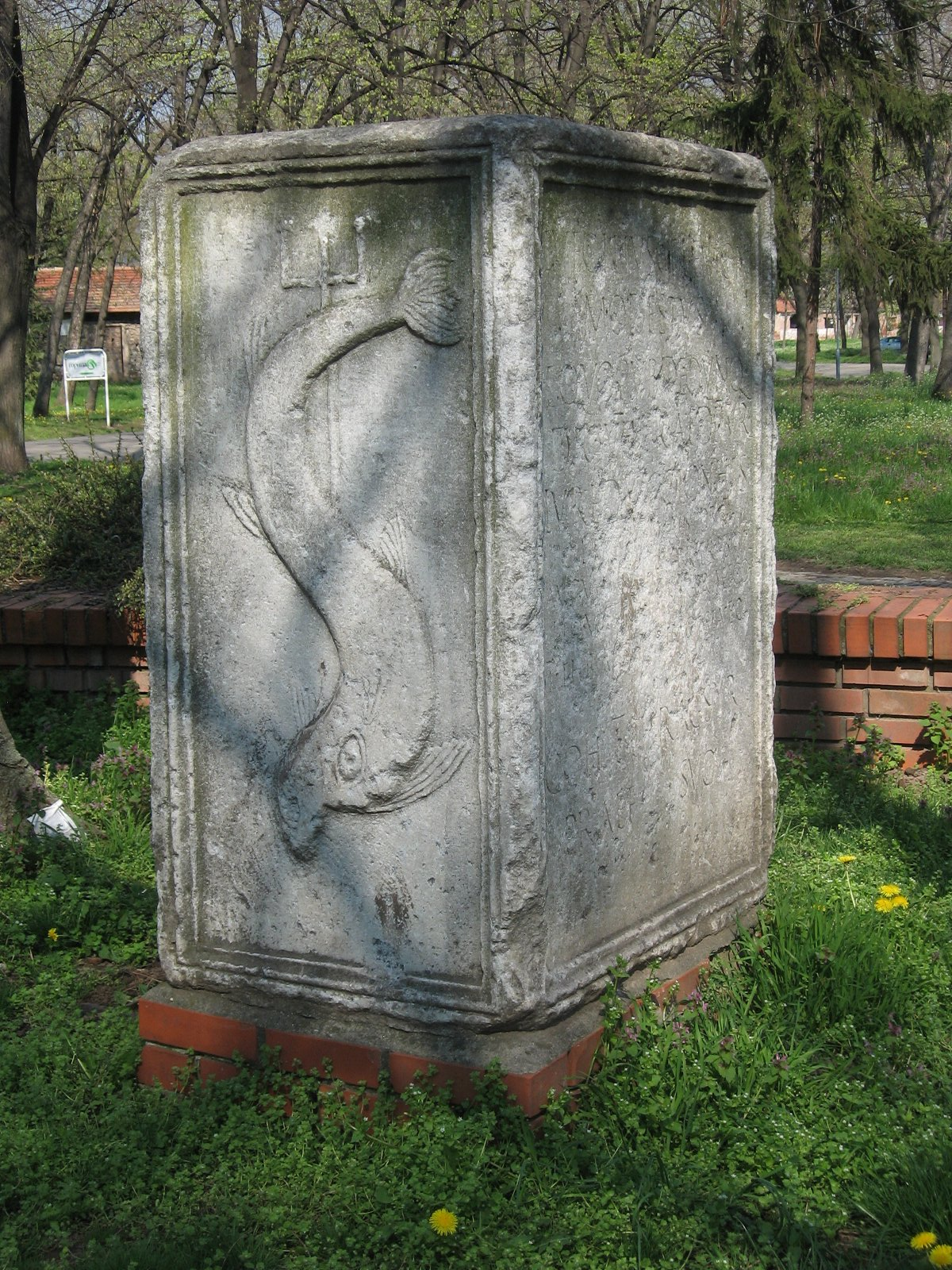
A lapidarium.

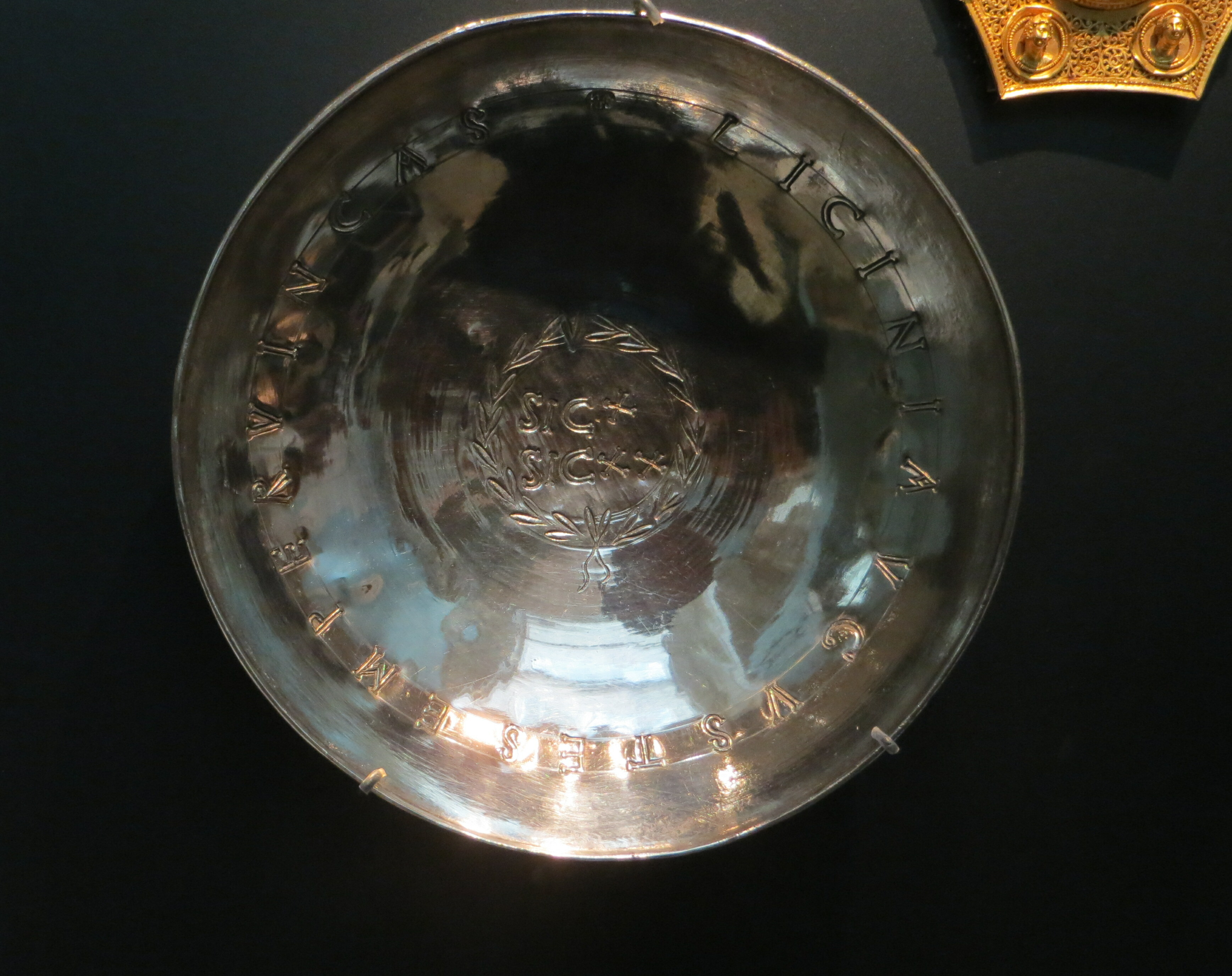
Late Roman silver commemorative plate marking the tenth anniversary of Licinius I, one of a set of five found in Niš in 1901 (British Museum)

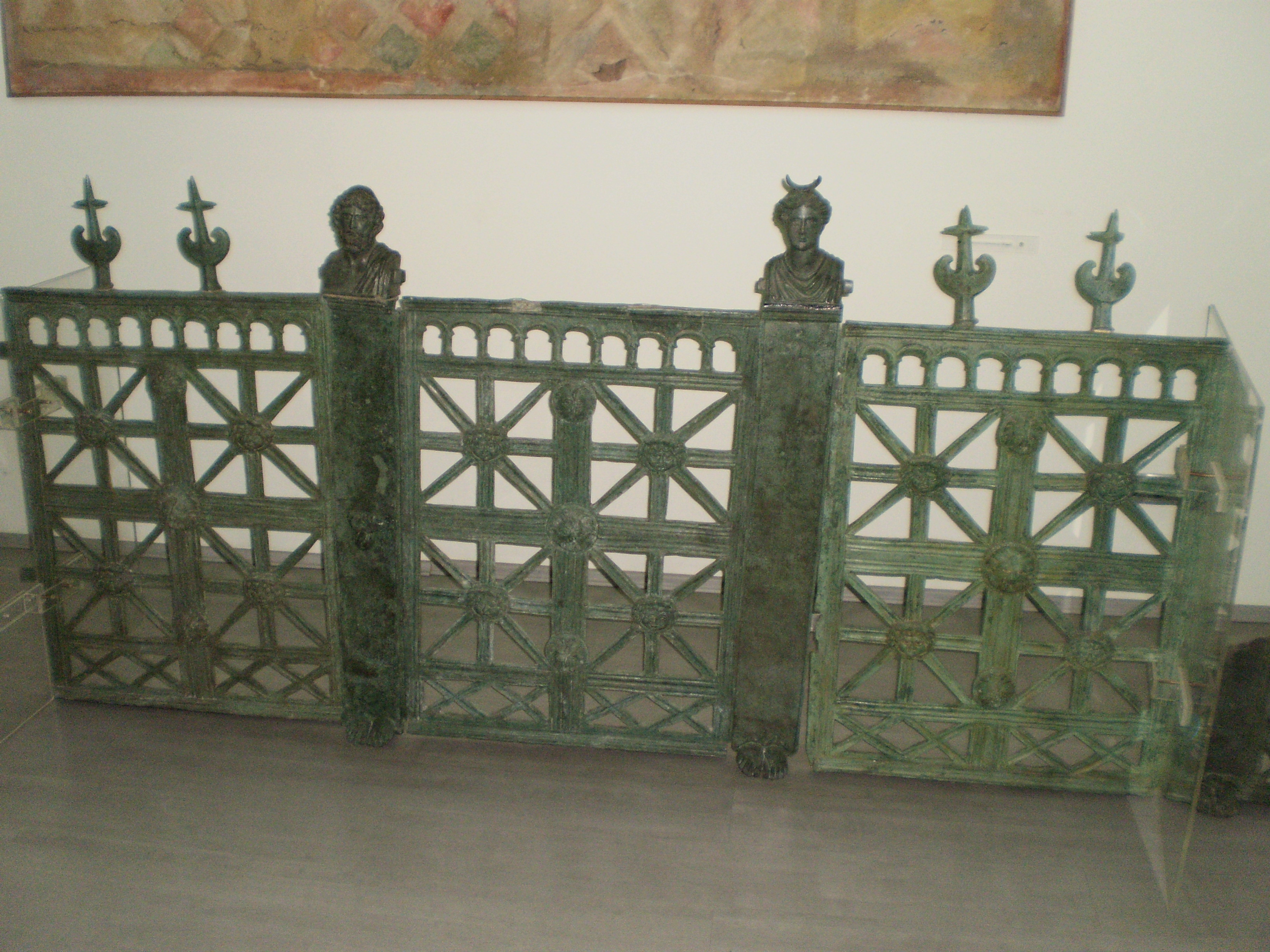
Bronze herma with busts of Aesculapius, Luna and cancellus from Mediana, 4th century, National Museum, Niš. In 2000, archaeologists discovered a mounting bronze fence at the site of Mediana.

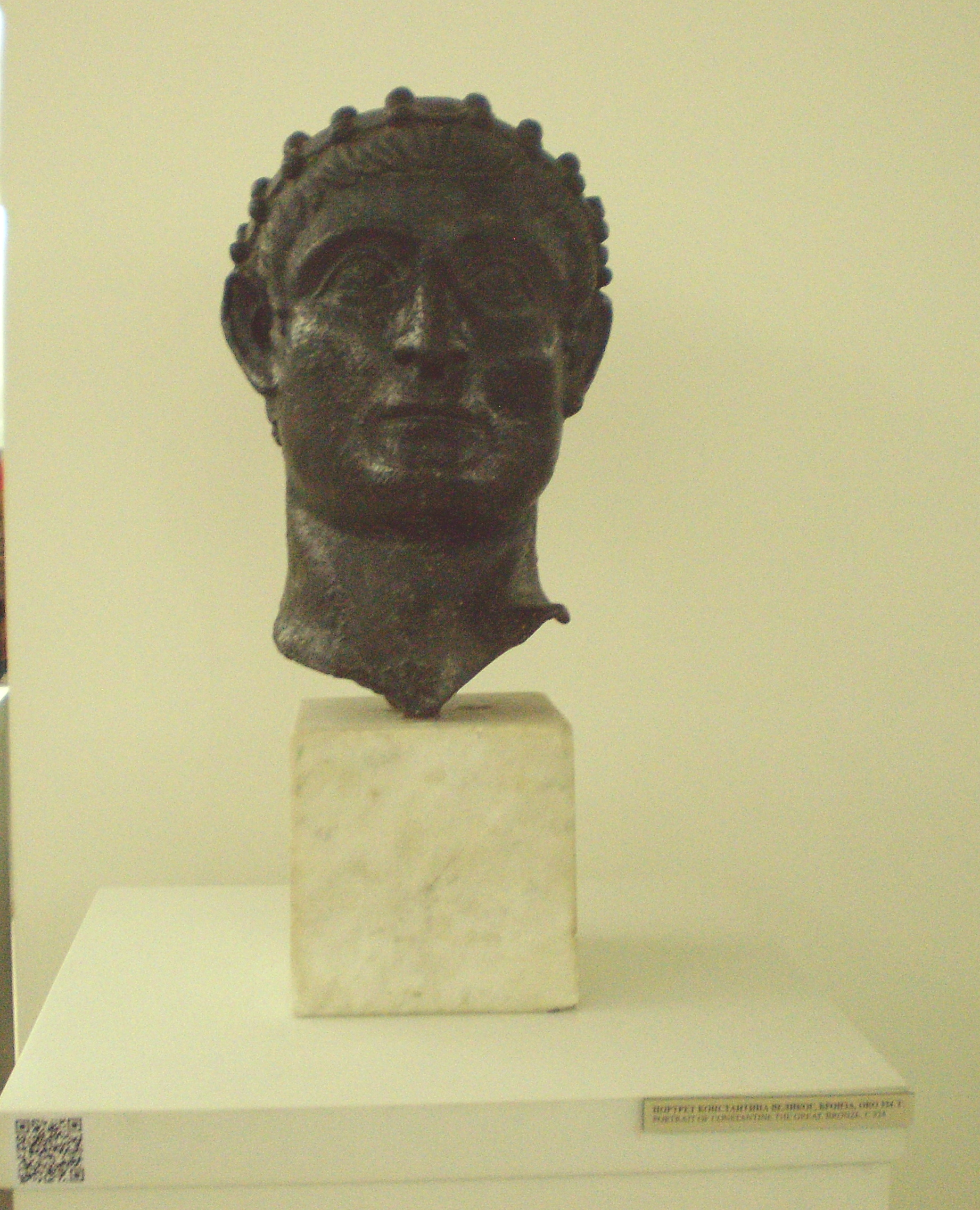
Replica bronze head of Constantine the Great, which was discovered during the construction of an iron bridge on the banks of the River Nišava on 1900, Visitor Center of Mediana. The original is kept in the National Museum of Serbia.

== Middle Ages ==
=== Early Middle Ages ===
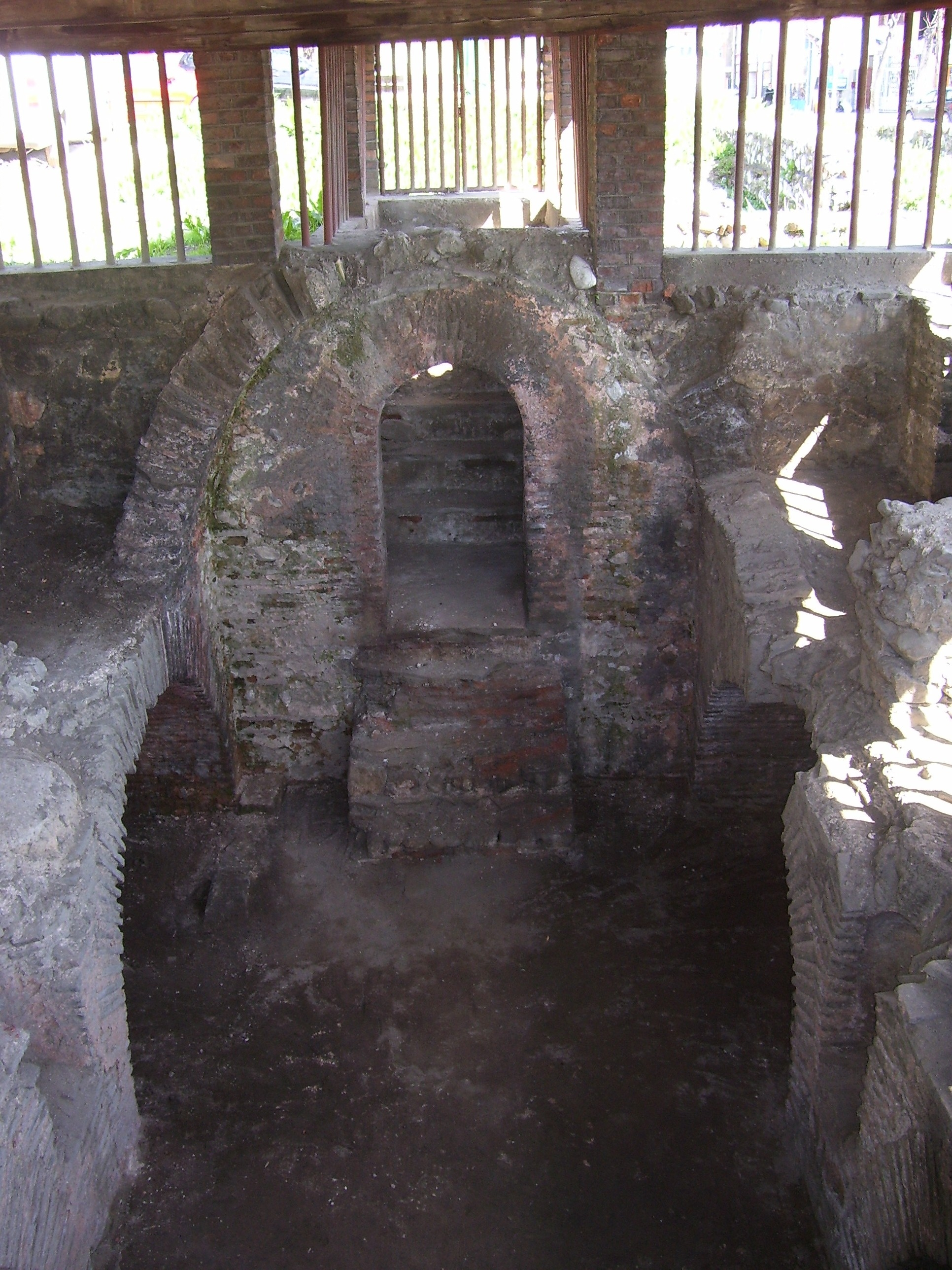
Early Byzantine tomb with frescoes, Serbian Cultural Heritage

The latter half of the 6th century AD saw the first major migrations of Slavs and Avars. During the 6th and 7th century, Slavic tribes made eight attempts to take Niš. In 551, the Slavs crossed Niš initially headed for Thessalonica, but ended up in Dalmatia. By the 580s the Slavs had conquered Serbia to much of northern Greece. During the final attack in 615 the invaders took the city, and most of the Roman and Romanized Daco-Thracian population fled, perished, or became assimilated.

The Slavs in the Sclaviniae remain independent for some while; in 785, Macedonia was reconquered by the Byzantine Empire under Constantine VI. In 805, the town and its surroundings were taken by Bulgarian ruler Krum and became part of the Bulgarian Empire.

=== High Middle Ages ===
In 1018, the Theme of Bulgaria was established by Emperor Basil II, who had conquered Bulgaria and Serbia. Niš was one of its main cities. Prince Constantine Bodin was crowned Emperor of Bulgaria in 1072, amid a Bulgarian revolt against the Byzantine Empire. Bodin conquered Niš, but was later captured. During the People's Crusade, on July 3, 1096, Peter the Hermit clashed with Byzantine forces at Niš, losing a quarter of his men, but managed to march on to Constantinople.

The Byzantine Emperor Manuel I Komnenos (r. 1143–1180) had the town fortified, and in 1155, handed the region of Dendra (Niš and its environ) over to Prince Desa, as an appanage. In 1162, Manuel I met with Stefan Nemanja at Niš, where Nemanja was given the region of Dubočica (Leskovac) alongside Niš. By 1188, Niš had become Nemanja's capital. On 27 July 1189, Nemanja received Holy Roman Emperor Frederick Barbarossa and his 100,000 crusaders at Niš. When describing Serbia during the rule of Vukan II in 1202, the mention of Niš shows its special status. In 1203, Kaloyan of Bulgaria annexed Niš. Stefan Nemanjić later regained the region.

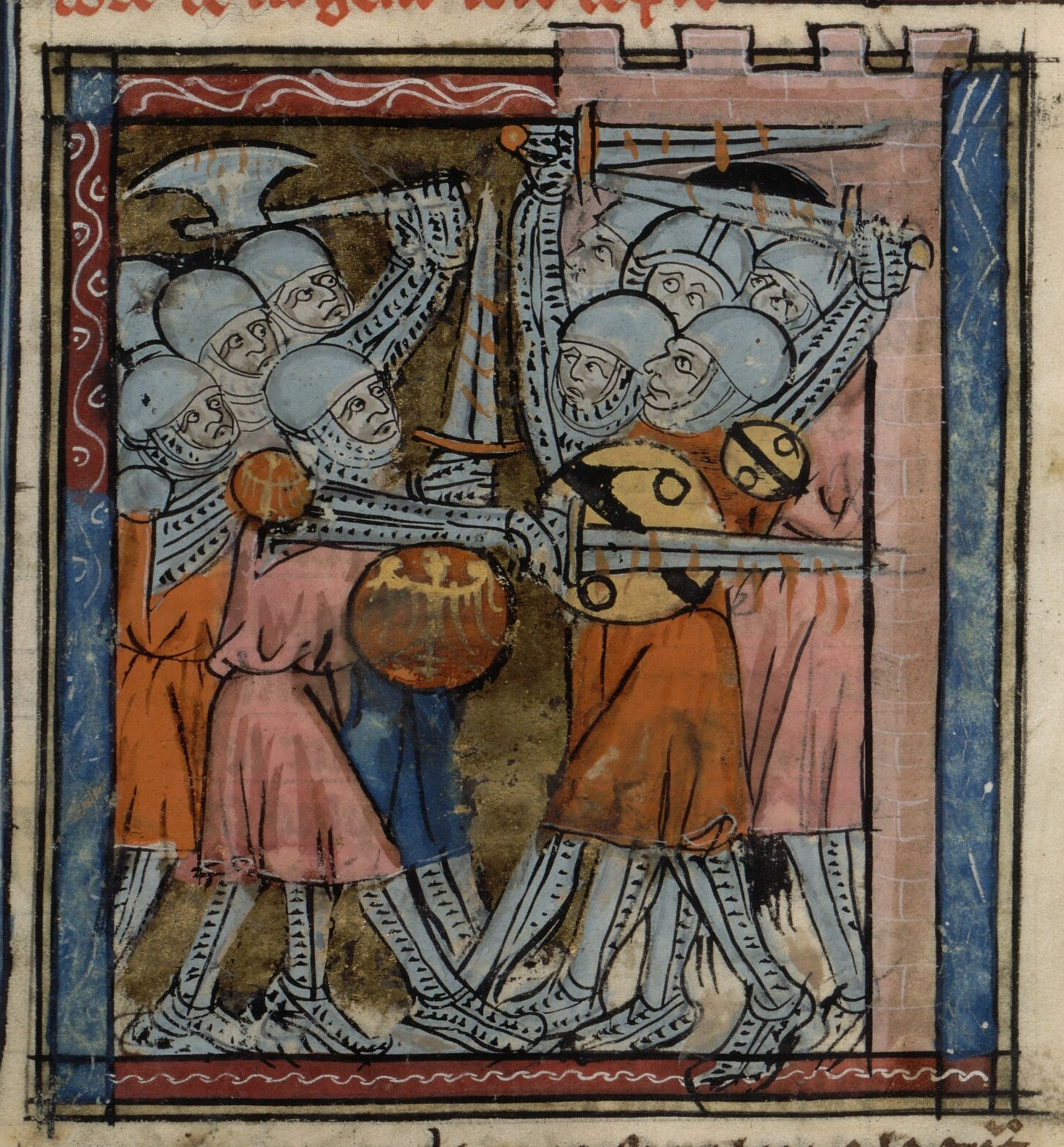
Siege of Niš in 1096 (First Crusade).

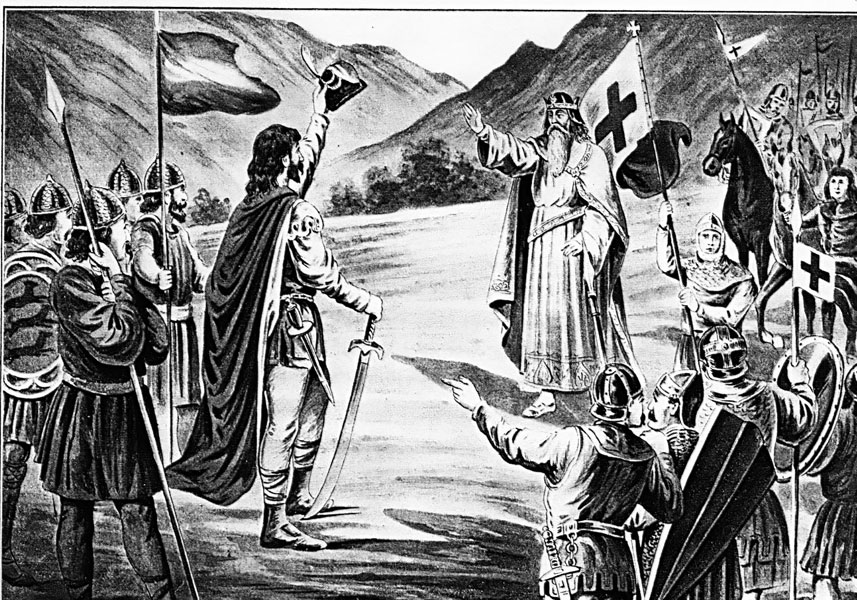
Stefan Nemanja meeting Frederick Barbarossa in 1189.

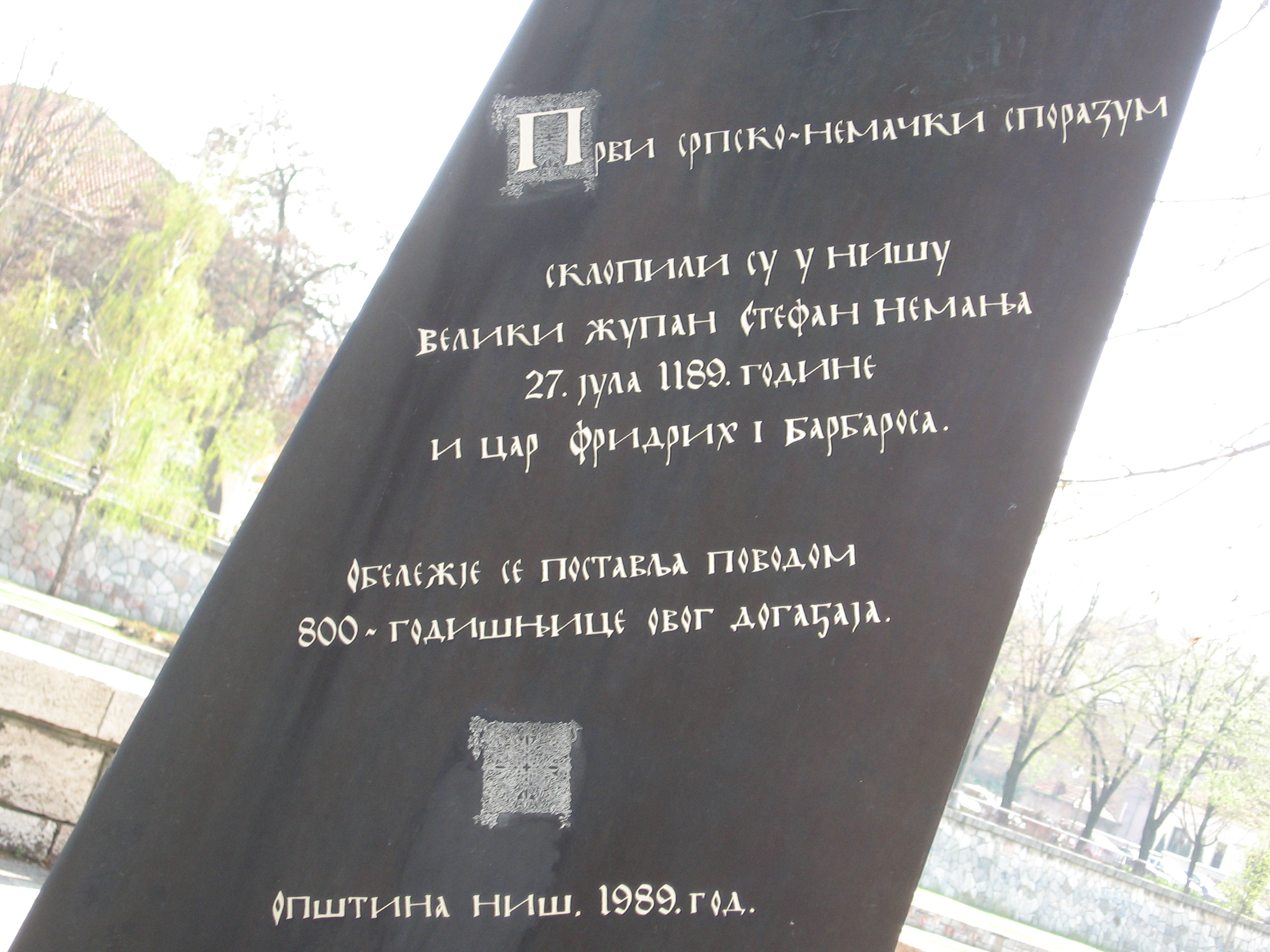
Monument to Frederick Barbarossa.

=== Late Middle Ages ===
In 1375, the Ottoman Turks captured Niš for the first time. After a 25-day-long siege, the city fell to the Turks. The fall of the Serbian state decided the fate of Niš as well. After the Battle of Kosovo in 1389, even though Serbia existed much weakened as a semi-independent state for another 70 years, the Constantinople-Vienna road grew deserted.

In 1443, Niš fell into the hands of Ludanjin. The town itself was given back to the Serbs, while Branković gave it over to Đorđe Mrnjavčević. In the so-called Long Campaign, Christian armies, led by the Hungarian military leader Janos Hunyadi (known as Sibinjanin Janko in Serbian folk poetry) together with Serbian Despot Đurađ Branković, defeated the Turks and pushed them back to Sofia. An important battle was fought near Niš. The crusaders led by John Hunyadi, captured Ottoman stronghold Niš and defeated three armies of the Ottoman Empire. After this battle, which was part of Hunyadi's expedition known as the long campaign, Niš remained under the control of Serbian Despotate.

== The Ottoman era ==
Niš succumbed to Ottoman rule again in 1448 and remained thus for the following 241 years. During period of Ottoman rule, Niš was a seat of the Sanjak of Niš and Niš Eyalet. Niš Fortress, built in that period, still represents one of the most beautiful and best preserved edifices in the Balkans. The extant fortification is of Turkish origin, dating from the first decades of the 18th century (1719–1723). It is well known as one of the most significant and best preserved monuments of this kind in the Central Balkans. The Fortress was erected on the site of earlier fortifications - the ancient Roman, Byzantine, and later yet Medieval forts. The Fortress has a polygonal ground plan, eight bastion terraces and four massive gates. It stretches over 22 ha of land. The rampart walls are 2,100 m long, 8 m high and with an average thickness of 3 m thick. The building stone, brought from the nearby quarries, was hewn into rather evenly shaped blocks. The inside of the rampart wall was additionally fortified by a wooden construction, 'santrač', and an additional bulwark, 'trpanac'. On the outside, the Fortress was surrounded by a wide moat, whose northern part has been preserved to this day. Beside the massive stone rampart walls, the southern Stambol gate and the western Belgrade gate are pretty well preserved. Partly preserved are the water gates, while the northern Vidin gate and the south-east Jagodina gate are preserved only as remains. With a complete reconstruction of all the gates, the Niš Fortress would once again become, architecturally and functionally, a closed fortification system. On September 24, 1689, the Austrian army took the city after defeating the Turks at the Battle of Niš, but the Ottomans retook it the next year. In 1737, it was seized again by the Austrian army, in their campaign against the Turks. The war ended in 1739.

== The Serbian Revolution (1804–17) ==
The Serbian rebel leader Karađorđe, in his talks with the representatives of Russia, as well as in his talks with Napoleon and the Turks, pointed out that Niš had to belong to Serbia, stressing it crucial for the renewal of the Serbian state. The Serbian rebels headed towards Niš in order to take it over and continue towards their next goal, Old Serbia. Karađorđe's suggestion was to use the whole army to liberate Niš, while the rest of the commanders demanded to attack Niš from four different points, which was accepted. On 27 April 1809, the Serbian rebel army with its 16,000 soldiers approached the villages of Kamenica, Gornji and Donji Matejevac, near the town of Niš with Miloje Petrović as Commander-in-chief. The Serbian rebels made six trenches. The first and biggest was on Čegar Hill under vojvoda Stevan Sinđelić. The second one was in Gornji Matejevac under Petar Dobrnjac. The third trench was north-east to Kamenica, under vojvoda Ilija Barjaktarević. The fourth trench was in Kamenica under Miloje Petrović. The fifth trench was in the mountain above Kamenica and under the control of vojvoda Pauljo Matejić, while the sixth one was made in Donji Matejevac. Miloje Petrović's request to attack Niš directly was not accepted. The rebels were told to wait while the town was being besieged.

Meanwhile, the Turkish army was reinforced with 20,000 soldiers from Adrianople, Thessalonica, Vranje and Leskovac. The Turks attacked the trench of Petar Dobrnjac on 30 May, while the following day, the Čegar Hill trench under Sinđelić was attacked. The battle lasted all day. As Milovan Kukić testified, the Turks attacked five times, and the Serbs managed to repulse them five times. Each time their losses were great. Some of the Turks attacked, and some of them went ahead, and thus when they attacked for the sixth time they filled the trenches with their dead so that those alive went over their dead bodies and they began to fight against the Serbs with their rifles, cutting and sticking in their enemies with their sabres and knives. The Serbian soldiers from other trenches cried out to help Stevan. But there was no help, either because they could not help without their cavalry, or because Miloje Petrović did not allow it.

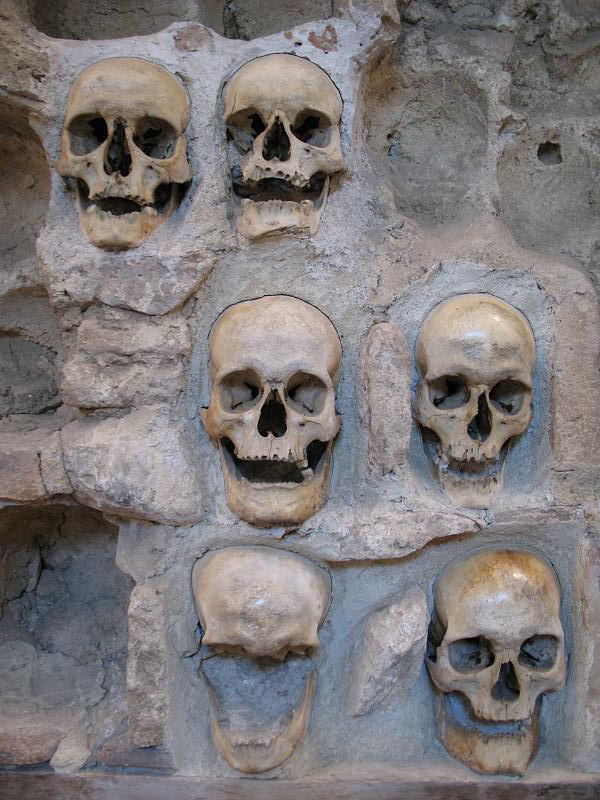
A wall of the Skull Tower a unique monument in Europe.

When Sinđelić saw that the Turks had taken over the trench, he ran to the powder cave, took out his gun and fired at the powder magazine. The explosion was so strong that all the surrounding area was shaken, and the whole trench was caught in a cloud of dense smoke. Stevan Sinđelić, who up to that moment had reached everywhere, helping and encouraging everybody, was blown up." Three thousand Serbian soldiers and more than twice as many on the Turkish side were killed on Čegar Hill. An important Serbian monument is the Skull Tower, a tower which contains the human skulls of dead Serbian rebels in its construction, a monument unique in its design.

== The Modern period (1817–1918) ==
In the 19th century the area was one of the centres of Bulgarian National Revival. The French Jérôme-Adolphe Blanqui, when travelling across the Balkans in 1841, describes the population of the Sanjak of Niš as Bulgarians. In 1870, Niš was included in the Bulgarian Exarchate. The city was also stipulated as the area to be ceded to Bulgaria according to the Constantinople Conference in 1876. Serbian author Milan Savic in his book "History of the Bulgarian people until the end of its state" issued in Novi Sad wrote, that at his time (1878) Nis and environs were Bulgarian populated. The urban population of Niš consisted of 17,107 Christian and 4,291 Muslim males, with total number of 3,500 Serbian houses and 2,000 Muslim houses. The urban Muslim population of Niš consisted mainly of Turks, of which a part were of Albanian origin, and the rest were Muslim Albanians and Muslim Romani.

In the 1841, after a failed uprising, some 10,000 people fled the Niš region into Serbia.

In 1861, Midhat Pasha was put in charge of the Niš Eyalet. He was a reformer influenced by Western ideas and the eyalet became a showpiece of the reformist movement. He tackled the problems of communications and security: he set up a system of block-houses to stop the incursion of armed bands from Serbia. According to his laudatory son's biography of him, "he organized a gendarmerie, secured the peaceful collection of taxes, and put an end to all religious persecution." He also established schools and hospitals for members of all religious groups without discrimination. Midhat's reforms were so successful that they inspired a reworking of the Ottoman system. In 1864, the council of state decided that the eyalets would be replaced by larger vilayets. At each of these main levels of rule, there would be mixed Muslim-Christian councils. The first of the vilayets was run for a time by Midhat Pasha and it included the former Niš Eyalet and much of Bulgaria and was called the "Danube Vilayet." In the next three years, he carried out an extensive programme of school-building and other public works, as well as introducing a provincial newspaper.

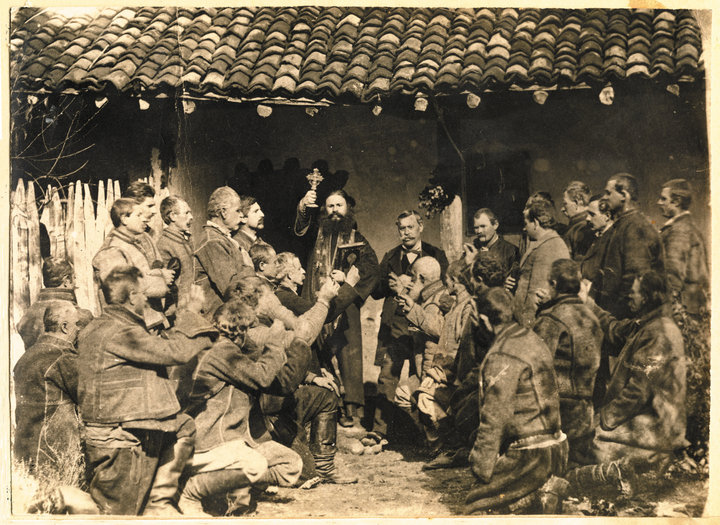
Photograph of the Niš Committee swearing oath, 24 September 1874.

On February 24, 1874, the "Serbian Liberation Committee for the Sanjak of Niš", known simply as the Niš Committee, was founded and organized by Kole Rašić, Todor Milovanović, Dimitrije Đorđević, Milan Novičić, Tasko Tasa Uzunović, Đorđe Pop-Manić, Mihajlo Božidarac, and Todor Stanković. They gathered at Božidarac's house, and Orthodox priest Petar Ikonomović swore Oath on the Christian cross and Gospel, reminiscent of the Orašac Assembly (1804). The Niš Committee's plan was a systematic action, through local uprisings weaken the Ottomans, and with gradual arming of the people help liberate the region. Kole Rašić was declared vojvoda.

Niš was eventually incorporated into Serbia during the wider Russo-Turkish War (1877-1878) and the Serbian Army entered Niš on 11 January 1878. During the Serbian–Ottoman War (1876–1878) the Albanian neighbourhood was burned to the ground and some of the Muslim population of Niš fled to the Ottoman vilayet of Kosovo resettling in Pristina where they dominated trade, while others went to Skopje. The number of remaining Muslims counted were 1,168, with many being Muslim Romani, out of the pre-war ca. 8,500. The demographics of Niš underwent change whereby Serbs who formed half the urban population prior to 1878 became 80 percent in 1884. In the following years, the city saw rapid development. City library was founded in 1879, and its first clerk was Stevan Sremac. The first hotel, Europe, was built in 1879; a hospital and the first bank started operating in 1881. The City hall was built from 1882 to 1887. In 1883, Kosta Čendaš established the first printing house. In 1884, the first newspaper in the city Niški vesnik was started. In 1884 Jovan Apel built a brewery. A railway line to Niš was built in 1884, as well as the city's railway station; on 8 August 1884, the first train arrived from Belgrade. Since 1885, Niš was the last station of the Orient Express, until the railroad was built between Niš and Sofia in 1888. In 1887 Mihailo Dimić founded the "Niš Theatre Sinđelić." In 1897 Mita Ristić founded the Nitex textile factory. In 1905 the painter Nadežda Petrović established the Sićevo art colony. The first film was screened in 1897, and the first permanent cinema started operating in 1905. The hydroelectric dam in Sićevo Gorge on Nišava was built in 1908; at the time, it was the largest in Serbia. The airfield was built in 1912 on the Trupale field, and the first aeroplane arrived on 29 December 1912. City Museum was founded in 1913, hosting archaeological, ethnographic and art collections.

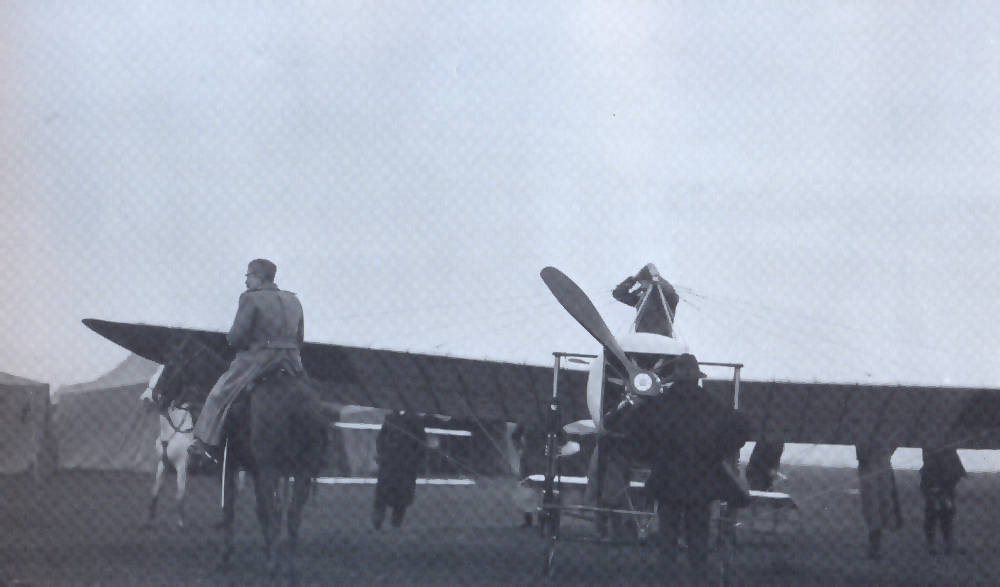
The first airplane (a Blériot XI) ever flown over Niš in 1912.

During the First Balkan War, Niš was the seat of the Main Headquarters of the Royal Serbian Army, which led military operations against the Ottoman Empire. In World War I, Niš was the wartime capital of Serbia, hosting the government and the National Assembly, until the Central Powers conquered Serbia in November 1915. After the breakthrough of the Thessaloniki Front, the First Serbian Army commanded by General Petar Bojović liberated Niš on October 12, 1918.

== Contemporary history ==
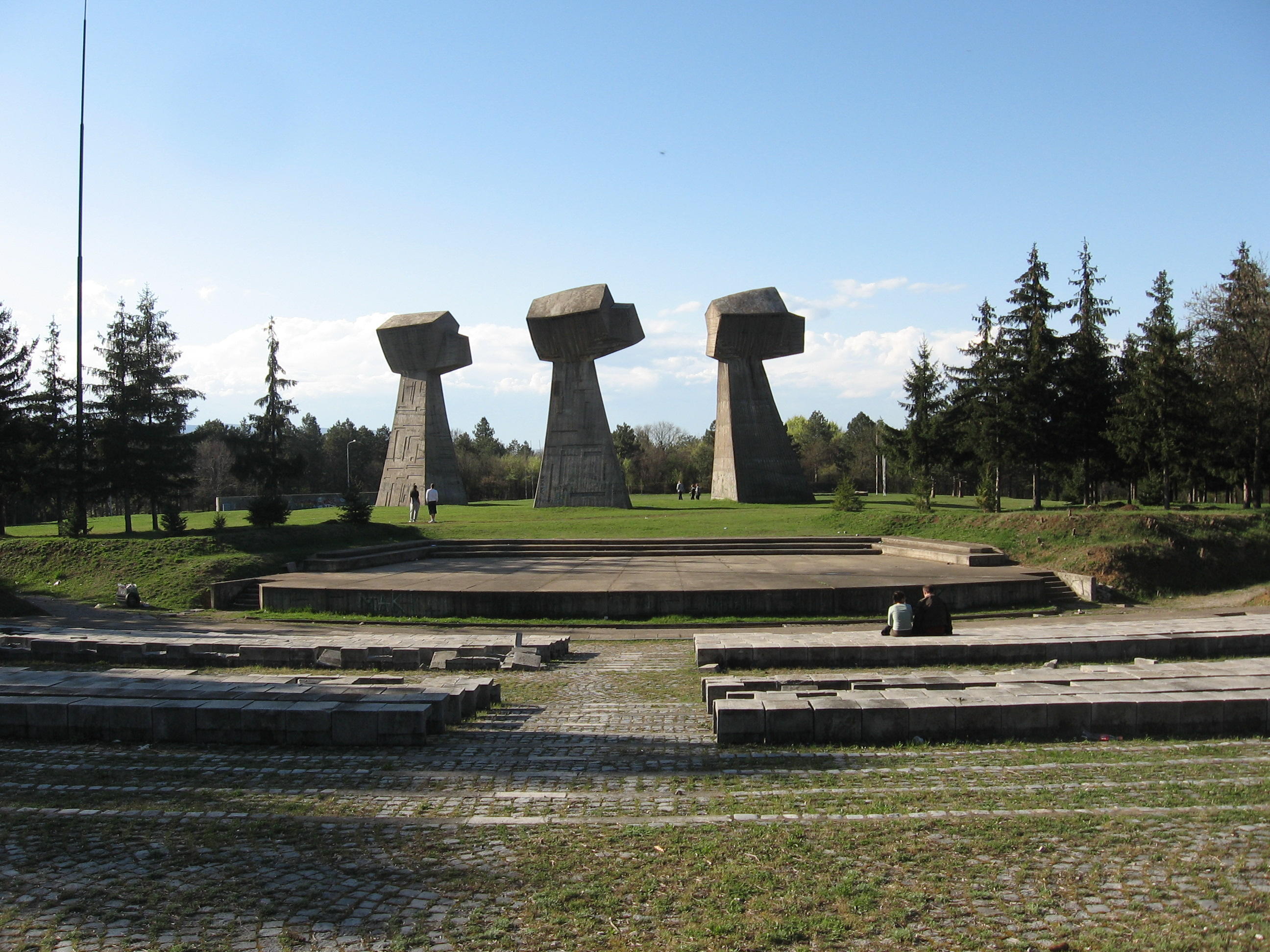
Bubanj WW2 Memorial Park.

In the first few years after the war, Niš was recovering from the damage. The tram system in Niš started to run in November 1930. The national airline Aeroput included Niš as a regular destination for the route Belgrade—Niš—Skopje—Thessaloniki in 1930.

During the time of German occupation in World War II, the first Nazi concentration camp in Yugoslavia was located near Niš. On February 12, 1942, 147 prisoners staged a mass escape. In September 1943, the Germans established the Dulag 413 transit camp for Italian Military Internees in the city. In 1944 the city was heavily bombed by the Allies. On October 14, 1945, after a long and exhausting battle, the 7th SS Volunteer Mountain Division Prinz Eugen was defeated and Niš was liberated by the Bulgarian Army, and Partisans. The city was heavily bombed by the Allies in 1944 along with other cities in Axis Serbia.

In 1996, Niš was the first city in Serbia to stand against the government of Slobodan Milošević. A coalition of democratic opposition parties called Zajedno (Together) won the local elections in Niš in 1996. The first democratic mayor of the City of Niš was Zoran Živković, who later became the Prime Minister of Serbia in 2003. On May 7, 1999, it was the site of the NATO Cluster bombing of Niš that resulted in many civilian casualties and no military losses. During the local elections held in September 2004, Smiljko Kostić of Nova Srbija was elected as mayor. The democratic party provoked a referendum to recall Kostić in November 2005. The majority voted against recall. In the local elections held in May 2008, the Democratic Party, G17+ and the coalition assembled around the Socialist Party of Serbia won, and Miloš Simonović from the Democratic party became the elected mayor.

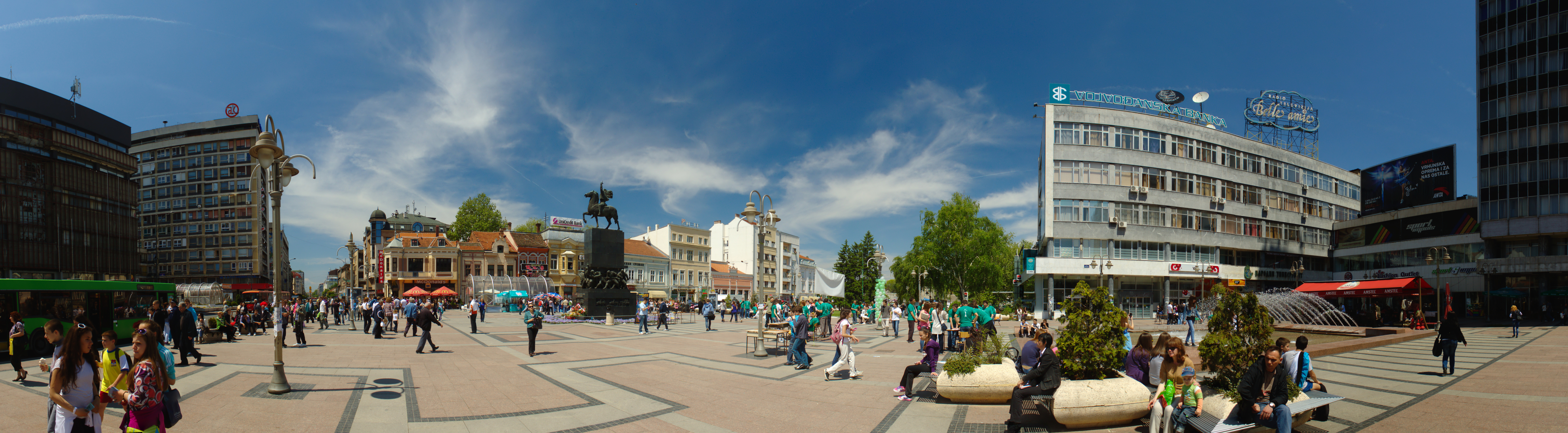
Panorama picture of the square of King Milan I of Serbia in modern-day Niš.

== Historical sites ==
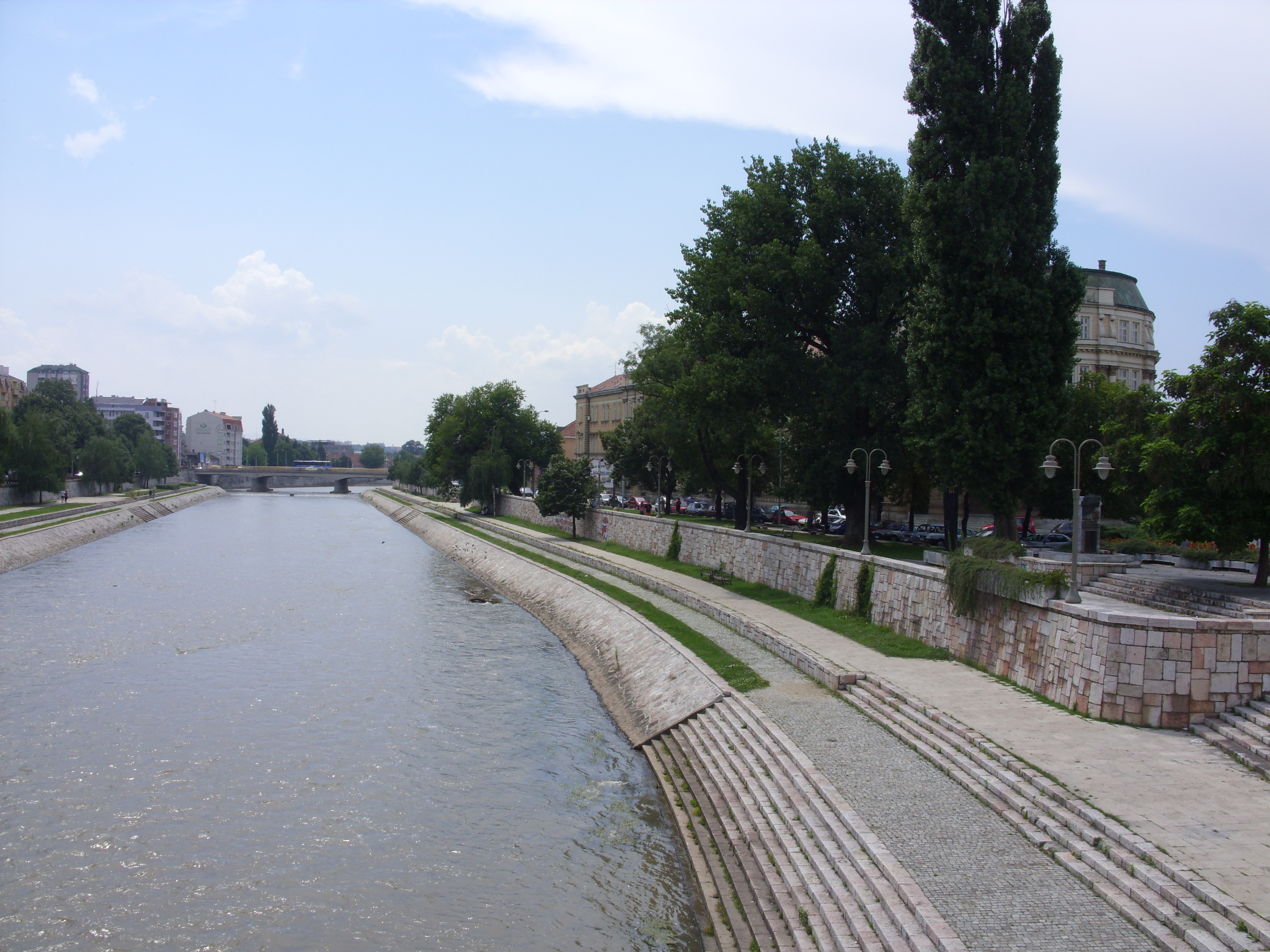
Nišava River at downtown of Niš.

- Skull Tower - A tower made out of Serb skulls decapitated by Turks in the 19th century.
- Niš Commonwealth Military Cemetery graves of British soldiers or nurses of WWI
- Niš Fortress
- Mediana - Archaeological site, Roman imperial villa.
- Tinkers Alley - Example of original architecture from Ottoman period.
- Crveni Krst concentration camp - Built by occupying German forces during WWII.
- Bubanj - Monument to the fallen Yugoslav WWII fighters.

== Roman emperors ==
Three Roman emperors were born in this city

- Constantine I, the Great, (Flavius Valerius Aurelius Constantinus) – ruled 306 to 337
- Constantius III, (Flavius Constantius) – ruled 421
- Justin I, (Flavius Iustinus) – ruled 518 to 527

== Demographic history ==
- 1498: Christian Majority; 4,242 Christian Households, 297 Muslim Households. Names of the Inhabitants in Niš Kadiluk showed an overwhelming Slavic population.
- 1878: 12,801 inhabitants, 2,719 households
- 1884: 16,178 inhabitants, 4,491 households
- 1890: 19,877 inhabitants, 3,256 households
- 1895: 21,524
- 1900: 24,573 inhabitants in the town, 31,635 inhabitants, 4,016 households in Niš srez
- 1905: 21,946
- 1910: 24,949
- 1921: 28,625
- 1931: 35,465
- 1941: 44,800 (estimate)
- 1948: 49,332 (109,280)*
- 1953: 58,656 (122,100)*
- 1961: 81,250 (148,354)*
- 1971: 127,654 (195,362)*
- 1981: 161,376 (232,563)*
- 1991: 173,250 (245,182)*
- 2002: 173,724 (250,518)*
- 2008: 182,209 (252,000)

()* - population according to the present-day boundaries of the city

== See also ==
- History of Belgrade

== Annotations ==
1. It is attested, apart from the norm forms "Naissus", "Νάϊσσος", "Ναϊσσός" (Naissos), as "Naessus" by Ammianus Marcellinus, "urbs Naisitana" by Jordanes, "Navissus" and "Navissum" in Consentii ars, "Ναϊσσούπολις" by Procopius.
2. Holder and Tomaschek connected the name to Celtic river names Nava and Navios, while Detschew and Georgiev believed it to be older than the Celtic invasion, and therefore, Thracian; they derived it from Indo-European *(s)naw-ĭsjo, Old Indic snauti meaning "drops, flowing", Greek νᾱμα (nāma) meaning "stream".

== Sources ==
Books

- Anastasijević, Stojan (1952). Борбе за ослобођење Ниша: 1809-1944. Niš.
- Andrejević, S. Историја Ниша.
- Dejanović, Dragoljub (1968). Niš u vihoru oslobodilačkog rata (1941-1945). Savez udruženja boraca narodnooslobodilačkog rata SR Srbije.
- Lovrić, B. (1927). Историја Ниша 1878-1928 [History of Niš 1878-1928]. Ниш.
- Milić, Danica, ed. (1983). Istorija Niša: Od najstarijih vremena do oslobođenja od Turaka 1878. godine. Belgrade; Niš: Istorijski institut Beograd; Gradina; Prosveta.
- Mirčetić, Dragoljub (1994a). Vojna istorija Niša [Military history of Niš]. Vol. 1. Prosveta.
- Mirčetić, Dragoljub (1994b). Vojna istorija Niša [Military history of Niš]. Vol. 2. Prosveta.
- Mirčetić, Dragoljub (1994c). Vojna istorija Niša [Military history of Niš]. Vol. 3. Prosveta.
- Mišić, Siniša (2010). Лексикон градова и тргова средњовековних српских земаља: према писаним изворима. Завод за уџбенике. pp. 188–. ISBN 978-86-17-16604-3. "Ниш"
- Mócsy, András (2014) [1974]. Pannonia and Upper Moesia: A History of the Middle Danube Provinces of the Roman Empire. New York: Routledge. ISBN 9781317754251.
- Papazoglu, Fanula (1969). Srednjobalkanska plemena u predrimsko doba. Tribali, Autarijati, Dardanci, Skordisci i Mezi. Djela - Akademija nauka i umjetnosti Bosne i Hercegovine. Odjeljenje društvenih nauka (in Croatian). Vol. 30. Sarajevo: Akademija nauka i umjetnosti Bosne i Hercegovine.
- Papazoglu, Fanula (1978). The Central Balkan Tribes in pre-Roman Times: Triballi, Autariatae, Dardanians, Scordisci and Moesians. Amsterdam: Hakkert. ISBN 9789025607937.
- Paligorić, Mika (1937). Економско-културна историја Ниша. Niš.
- Rakocija, Miša (1998). Manastiri i crkve grada Niša. Prosveta. ISBN 9788674553657.
- Petrović, Petar, ed. (1979). Inscriptions de la Mésie supérieure. Vol. IV: Naissus — Remesiana — Horreum Margi. Belgrade: Centre for Ancient Epigraphy and Numismatics (CAEN).
- Petrović, Petar (1976). Ниш у античко доба [Niš in the Antique Period]. Niš: Gradina.
- Petrović, Vidosav (2002). Niš u delima putopisaca: od IV do XX veka. Vidosav Petrović. ISBN 978-86-902097-1-2.
- Ristić, Milovan (1937). Историја града Ниша. Odbor za podizanje spomenika oslobodiocima.
- Rudić, Srđan, ed. (2013). The World of the Slavs: Studies of the East, West and South Slavs: Civitas, Oppidas, Villas and Archeological Evidence (7th to 11th Centuries AD). Istorijski institut. ISBN 978-86-7743-104-4.

Journals

- Nedeljković, Slaviša (2014). "Društveni i agrarno-pravni položaj srpskog naroda u niškom pašaluku u prvim decenijama 19. veka" [Social and agrarian-legal status of the Serbian people in the Niš Pashaluk in the early decades of the 19th century] (PDF). Teme (3): 1349–1363.
- "Naissus у доба касне антике" (PDF). Jагодин мала касноантичка некропола [Late Antique necropolis Jagodin mala]. Niš: Narodni muzej Niš. 2015.
- Jocić, Miroslava (2004). "Праисторија Нишког краја" (PDF). Археолошко благо Ниша од неолита до средњег века: 37–48.

Conference papers

- Ниш и Византија: Зборник радова [Niš and Byzantium: Collection of Works]. Vol. I. Univerzitet u Nišu.
- Ниш и Византија: Зборник радова [Niš and Byzantium: Collection of Works]. Vol. II. Univerzitet u Nišu.
- Ниш и Византија: Зборник радова [Niš and Byzantium: Collection of Works]. Vol. III. Univerzitet u Nišu. 2005.
- Ниш и Византија: Зборник радова [Niš and Byzantium: Collection of Works]. Vol. IV. Univerzitet u Nišu. 2006.
- Ниш и Византија: Зборник радова [Niš and Byzantium: Collection of Works]. Vol. V. Univerzitet u Nišu. 2007.
- Ниш и Византија: Зборник радова [Niš and Byzantium: Collection of Works]. Vol. VI. Univerzitet u Nišu. 2008.

Vasić, Milan (2005). Naselja na Balkanskom Poluostrvu od XVI do XVIII Vijeka (in Serbian). Banja Luka: Narodna I Univerzitetska Biblioteka Republike Srpske. ISBN 99938-0-584-X.
