= Three-finger salute (Serbian) =

Serbian hand gesture

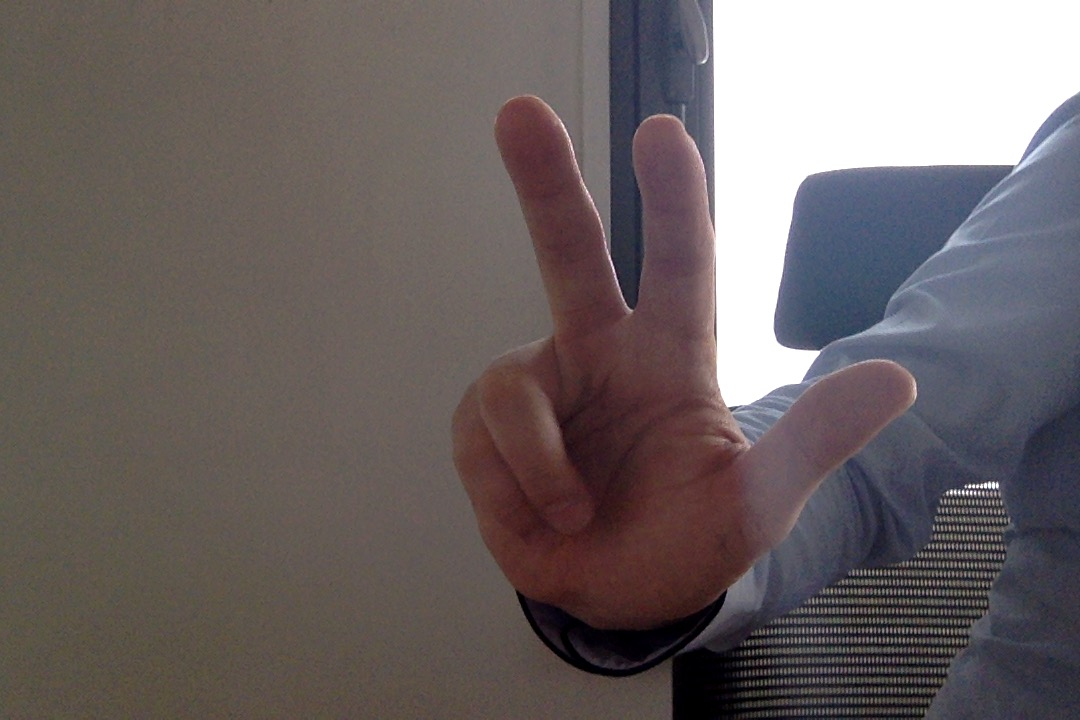
Three-finger salute

The three-finger salute, (Note: Serbian: поздрав са три прста, romanized: pozdrav sa tri prsta.) or simply the three fingers, (Note: Serbian: три прста, romanized: tri prsta.) commonly known as the Serbian salute, (Note: Serbian: српски поздрав, romanized: srpski pozdrav.) is a salute in which the thumb, index and middle fingers are extended. Originally an expression of the Holy Trinity used in oath-taking and a symbol of Serbian Orthodoxy, it is today a gesture used as a distinctive sign of ethnic Serbs and of belonging to the Serbian nation.

The salute is often accompanied by the Serbian flag and carries several layers of meaning; it is also used as a symbol of Serbian ethno-nationalism. It has been widely used in Serbian politics since the early 1990s, and during the 2026 Serbian parliamentary election it was adopted as a campaign symbol by the Student List, which was number three on the ballot.

== Origin ==
=== Oath-taking tradition ===
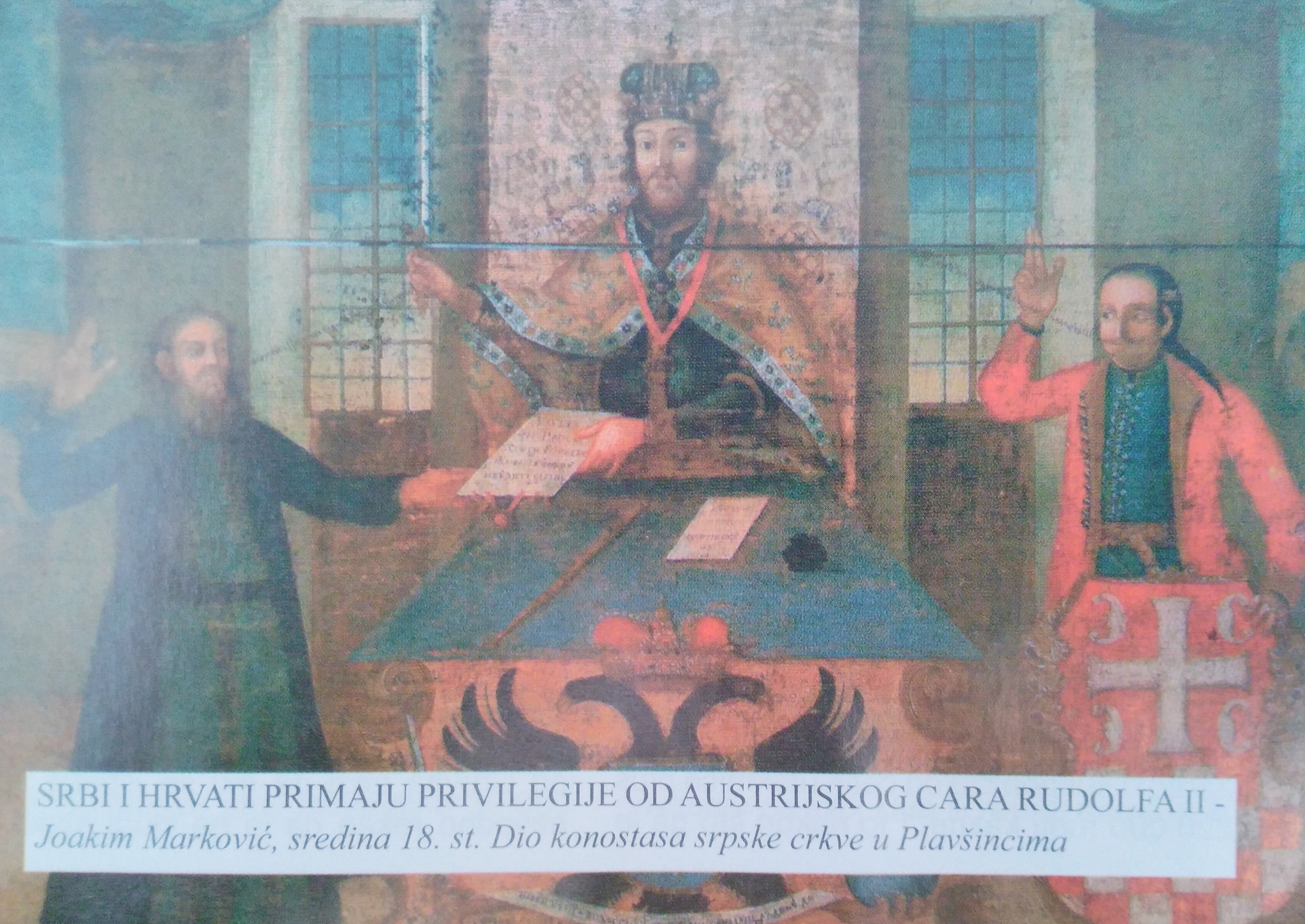
Serbs and Croats Receiving Privileges from the Emperor Rudolf II in 1612 (1750), by Joakim Marković

Around 1750, the Serbian Baroque icon painter Joakim Marković created two historical paintings, commissioned by Mihajlo Mikašinović, a soldier from a Serbian family in the Slavonian Military Frontier, for the iconostasis of a village church near Koprivnica, in present-day Croatia. One depicts Serbs and Croats receiving settlement rights from a Byzantine emperor, while the other portrays Emperor Rudolf II granting privileges to the Frontier Serbs in 1612. The latter painting features a raised right hand with three extended fingers, symbolising an oath of loyalty in exchange for the imperial privileges. The gesture is likely derived from the Central European Schwurhand oath-taking tradition, in which the three fingers represent the Holy Trinity.

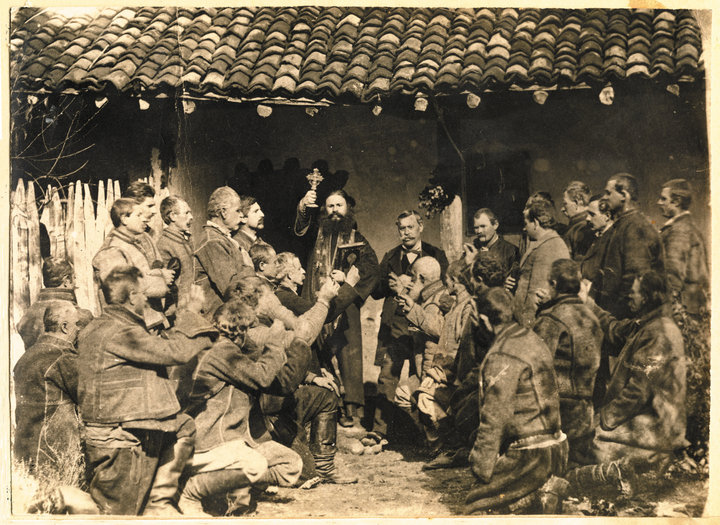
Photograph of the Niš Committee swearing an oath, 1874

The earliest known photograph of the three-finger salute shows members of the Niš Committee, established in 1874 to organise the liberation of Niš and its surroundings from Ottoman rule, swearing an oath before the priest Petar Ikonomović, who holds a cross. The conspirators, some kneeling and others standing, raise their hands with their fingertips touching.

=== Orthodox symbolism ===
The Takovo Uprising (1888), by Paja Jovanović

In Serbian and Orthodox tradition, the number three is exceptionally important. In Orthodoxy, three fingers are used when making the sign of the cross, symbolising the Trinity. When taking an oath, Serbs historically held up three fingers (joined, as when crossing oneself), saying "By my Holy Trinity" (Светог ми Тројства, Svetog mi Trojstva) or "For the Honourable Cross and Golden Freedom" (za krst časni i slobodu zlatnu) during formal and religious occasions. The salute was often made with both hands raised above the head. Serbian peasants sealed a pledge by raising three fingers to the face, the face being "the focus of honour" in Balkan culture. A Serbian proverb says "There is no cross without three fingers" (nema krsta bez tri prsta). Karađorđe was appointed leader of the Serbian rebels after they all raised their "three fingers in the air" and swore an oath.

The three fingers were regarded as a symbol of Serbdom in the 19th century. In The Mountain Wreath (1847), whose central theme is the Islamization of Serbs, Njegoš wrote that "the crossing with three fingers has not remained". Paja Jovanović's 1888 painting The Takovo Uprising depicts Miloš Obrenović holding a war flag and saluting with three fingers. The Serb-Catholic movement in Dubrovnik, which held that Serbs were of three faiths (Orthodoxy, Catholicism and Islam), criticised the Pan-Serbists who, according to them, "truly believed only those Serbs who cross themselves with three fingers".A short story published in 1901 tells of a meeting between a Serbian despot and a member of the House of Szilágyi, who has Franciscan friars cut off the despot's three fingers after a dispute over the correct way of crossing oneself.

The Serbian Orthodox bishop Nikolaj Velimirović called for a Serbian salute in which three fingers were to be raised with the greeting "So help us God!" (Тако нам Бог помогао!). In 1937, Velimirović began a sermon protesting against the concordat between Yugoslavia and the Holy See with the words "Raise three fingers, Orthodox Serbs!".

During World War II, the Catholic Church in the Independent State of Croatia sought to make Serbs renounce crossing themselves with three fingers. A letter from the Chetniks to the Yugoslav Partisans stressed that the real government was in London, in exile, and that the Chetniks would kill all who did not cross themselves with three fingers. An Ustaše song contained the line "Gone is the cross with three fingers" (Nesta krsta sa tri prsta), which referred to the Muslim ritual ablution and the Orthodox way of making the sign of the cross.

=== Modern form ===
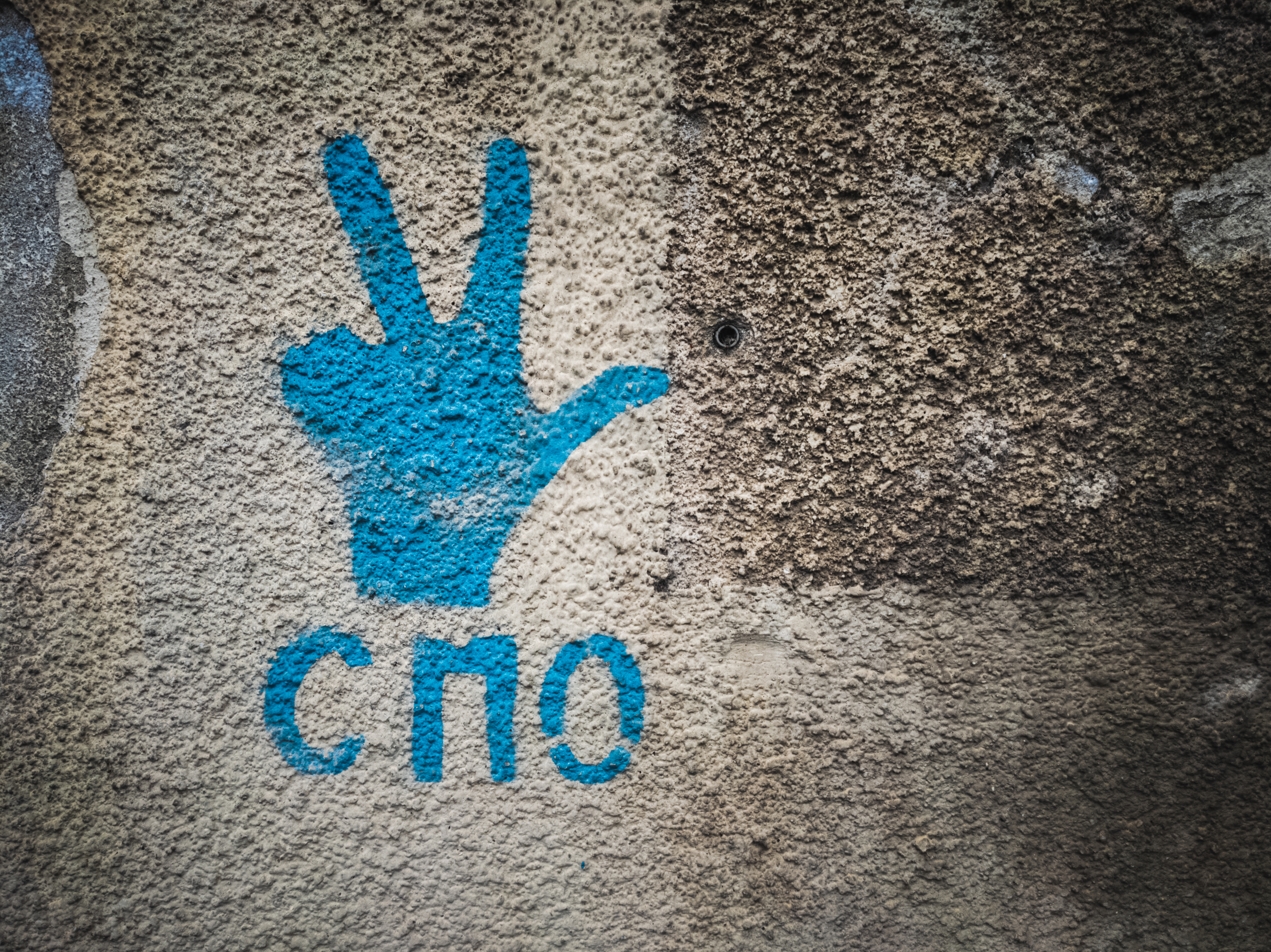
SPO graffiti in Belgrade

Vuk Drašković, the leader of the Serbian Renewal Movement (SPO), said in a 2007 interview that he first used the salute in 1990 at the founding meeting of the party, inspired by Paja Jovanović's painting. During the March 1991 demonstrations in Belgrade, the three fingers were widely used by Drašković's supporters, representing the three demands that the SPO had put to the government.

== Usage ==
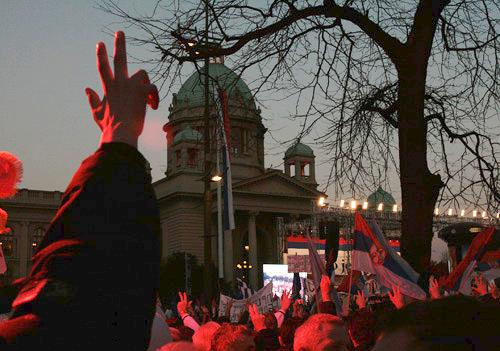
2008 Kosovo is Serbia rally in Belgrade

Today, the salute is used at a wide variety of events, from street demonstrations, celebrations and election rallies, where it is used by members and supporters of almost all Serbian political parties, to sporting events and personal celebrations such as weddings and birthday parties.

In 1998, the weekly NIN wrote of the "years-long demonisation" of the salute, "which has already entered the catalogue of planetary gestures", together with the clenched fist, the outstretched palm and the V sign.

2007 Eurovision winner Marija Šerifović used the salute when celebrating points; controversially, she used it when receiving the maximum of 12 points from Bosnian viewers, after which Bosnian media described it as a deliberate provocation. The Swedish-Serbian National Association called the criticism "ridiculous", saying that the salute should not be misunderstood in that way and was nothing more than "a modified V sign".

=== Political usage ===
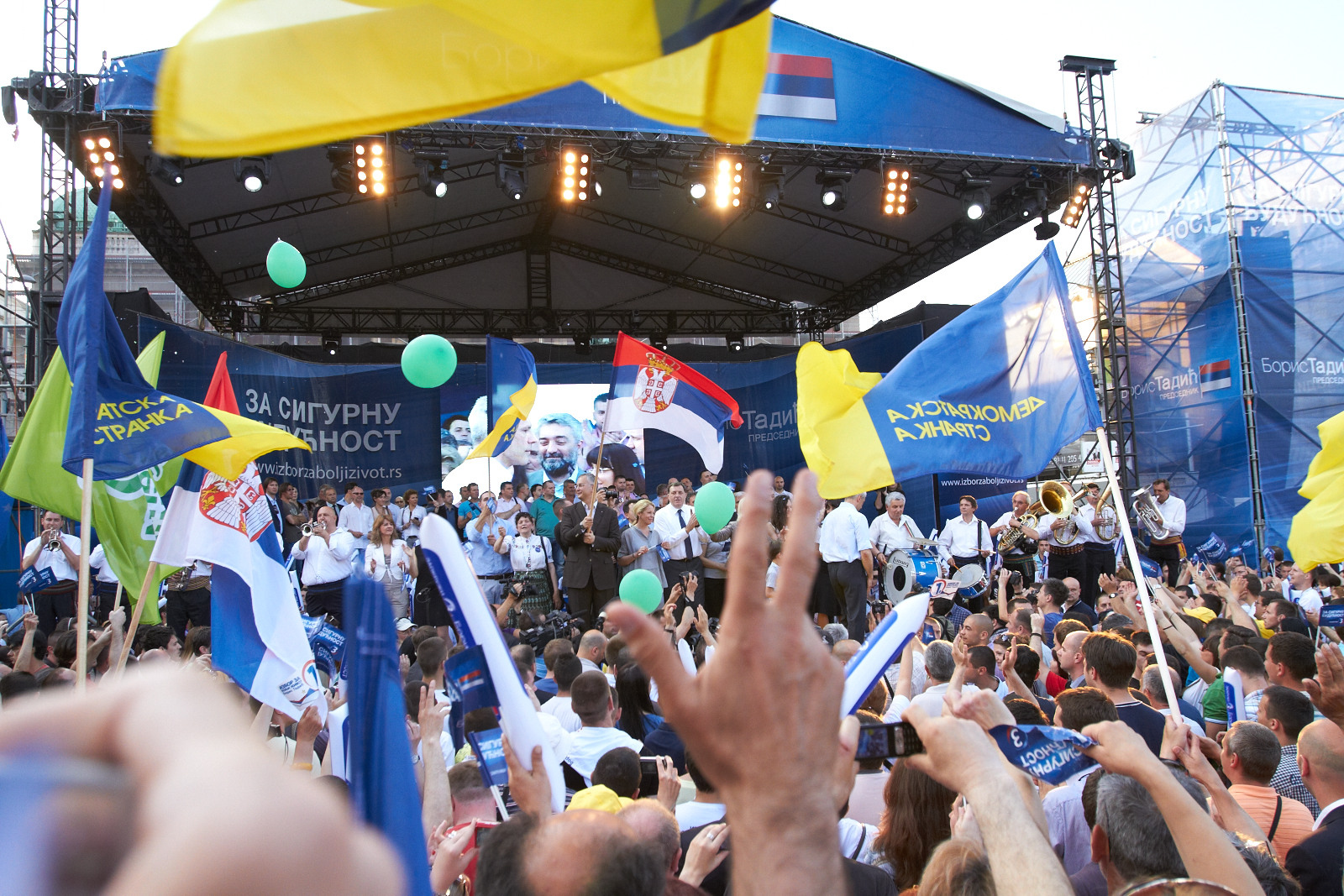
Boris Tadić electoral rally, 2012

After its introduction by the SPO in 1990–1991, the salute became a fixture of Serbian political life and was adopted at the rallies of parties across the political spectrum, including the Serbian Radical Party.

During the 2026 Serbian parliamentary election, the Student List, formed by the student movement that had led the anti-corruption protests, was assigned number three on the ballot and adopted the number and the three-finger gesture as campaign symbols, along with Snežana Savić's song "Tri poljupca" ("Three Kisses"). Vreme noted that the students had revived the salute as a positive national motif, and recalled that Dejan Bodiroga had famously raised three fingers after winning the 2002 FIBA World Championship. Commentators observed that the gesture, previously associated mainly with nationalists and government supporters, came to signify opposition to the government in Serbia, while in Croatia it continued to evoke the war iconography of the 1990s. The pro-government tabloid Kurir accused the students of deliberately shaping the number three in their campaign materials so that it would not resemble the Serbian salute. Several companies referred to the number three in their advertising during the campaign, which media interpreted as a sign of support for the students. According to Danas, an activist of the Serbian Progressive Party attacked a child in Belgrade for showing the three fingers. At the Student List's final rally at Slavija Square on 22 October, its candidates showed the three-finger sign while holding up the Constitution of Serbia.

=== Usage in sports ===
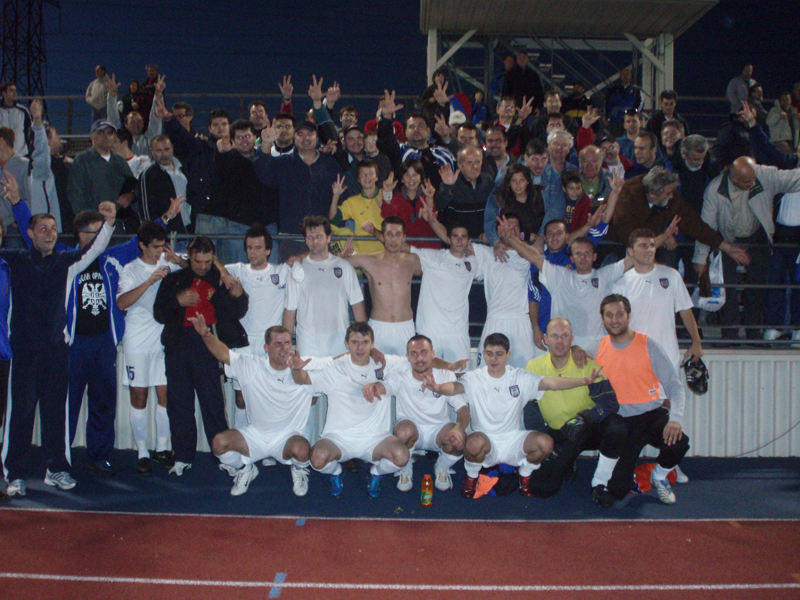
Serbian White Eagles team photo after a semi-final victory

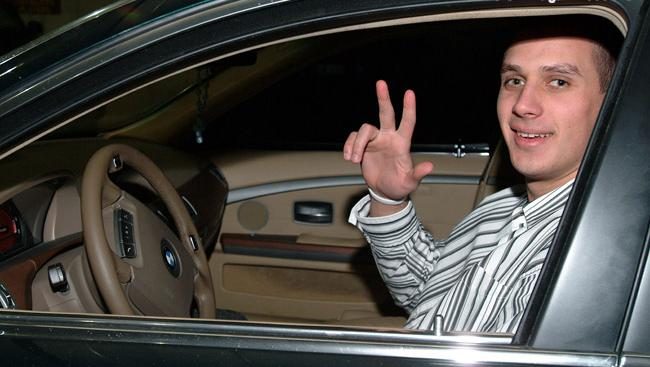
NBA player Aleksandar Pavlović displaying the three-finger salute

The salute is particularly visible among Serbian athletes. The tennis player Novak Djokovic often raises three fingers after his victories. In a well-known photograph of the Red Star Belgrade team celebrating their victory in the 1990–91 European Cup, eight players are seen making the salute, while the Croatian player Robert Prosinečki is not.

After winning the EuroBasket 1995, the entire Yugoslav team displayed the three fingers. Aleksandar Đorđević said that he made the gesture "not to be provocative. Just: that's Serbia, that's us, that's me – nothing else. It's my pride."

In 2001, Perth Glory's Bobby Despotovski, who is of Macedonian descent, was sanctioned by the Australian Soccer Federation for making the salute to the predominantly Croatian-Australian crowd at a Melbourne Knights home game and inciting a fight; Despotovski and coach Bernd Stange were subsequently assaulted by Knights fans, and the next fixture between the sides was moved to Launceston.

The water polo player Aleksandar Šapić said in 2007: "I know that soldiers used it in the war, but I do not raise three fingers because I hate someone. I respect all peoples, and I know what is in my heart."

The salute was met with disapproval in Turkey after Duško Tošić, then playing for Beşiktaş, made it following Serbia's away win against Albania in the Euro 2016 qualifiers; Beşiktaş fans threatened him on social media.

At the 2022 FIFA World Cup, FIFA opened a disciplinary case against Croatia after Croatian fans taunted the Canadian goalkeeper Milan Borjan, who was born in a Serb-majority region of Croatia that was affected by the conflict of the 1990s. The fans chanted that Borjan was an Ustaša, a reference to the fascist regime that carried out genocide against Serbs, Roma and Jews in Croatia and Bosnia and Herzegovina during World War II; in response, he showed the three-finger salute.

=== Wartime usage and controversies ===
Croats, Bosniaks and Kosovo Albanians, who have been at war with Serbs in the past, find the salute provocative. During the Yugoslav Wars, the salute was widely used as a Serb symbol. In the prelude to the Bosnian War, Bosnian Serbs were encouraged to vote in the 1991 Bosnian Serb referendum by posters displaying the three fingers. During the wars, Serb soldiers raised three fingers as a sign of victory.

When Russian peacekeepers entered Sarajevo in 1994, they greeted Serb troops with the salute, and were consequently considered pro-Serb; members of UNPROFOR used the Serb salute when greeting Serbs and the V sign when greeting Bosniaks, in order to appear impartial.

In its 2006 judgement in the case against Momčilo Krajišnik, the International Criminal Tribunal for the former Yugoslavia described atrocities committed by Serb military and police forces against Bosniak and Croat civilians in the Keraterm, Omarska and Trnopolje camps, in 1992, where detainees were executed, humiliated, and forced to spit on the Bosnian flag and make the three-finger sign. There were other instances in which non-Serb captives were forced to make the salute. According to a BBC documentary on the Srebrenica massacre, Bosniak civilians transported by bus to the village of Tišća saw Bosnian Serb soldiers making the three-finger sign; on arrival, Serb police forced them to hand over gold and jewellery and threatened to cut off the women's breasts.

In 1999, Human Rights Watch obtained photographs from the Kosovo Liberation Army (KLA) administration in Peć showing Serb soldiers carrying assault rifles and making the three-finger salute in front of burning houses. KLA officials told Human Rights Watch that the photographs had been found in the homes of Serbs in the Peć area after Serbian forces withdrew from Kosovo earlier that year. During the NATO bombing of Serbia in 1999, Colin Woodard described thousands of Serbian Americans who filled the park opposite the White House on Pennsylvania Avenue, chanting "Kosovo is Serbia" and "Stop the bombing" while wearing military caps and making the three-finger salute. In 2001, during the demobilisation of the Liberation Army of Preševo, Medveđa and Bujanovac (UCPMB), Serb forces shot dead a senior UCPMB commander who opposed the agreement, after he drove by accident into a village where Serb generals were leading a parade and giving the three-finger salute.

In May 2025, Kosovo's interior minister Xhelal Sveçla said that the salute, which some participants displayed during school graduation celebrations in North Mitrovica, symbolised the ethnic cleansing and "genocide" committed by Serbia in Kosovo and Serbia's claims on Kosovo.

== See also ==
- National symbols of Serbia
- Schwurhand
- Three-finger salute (pro-democracy)
