= Kole Rašić =

Serb revolutionary (c.1839–1898)

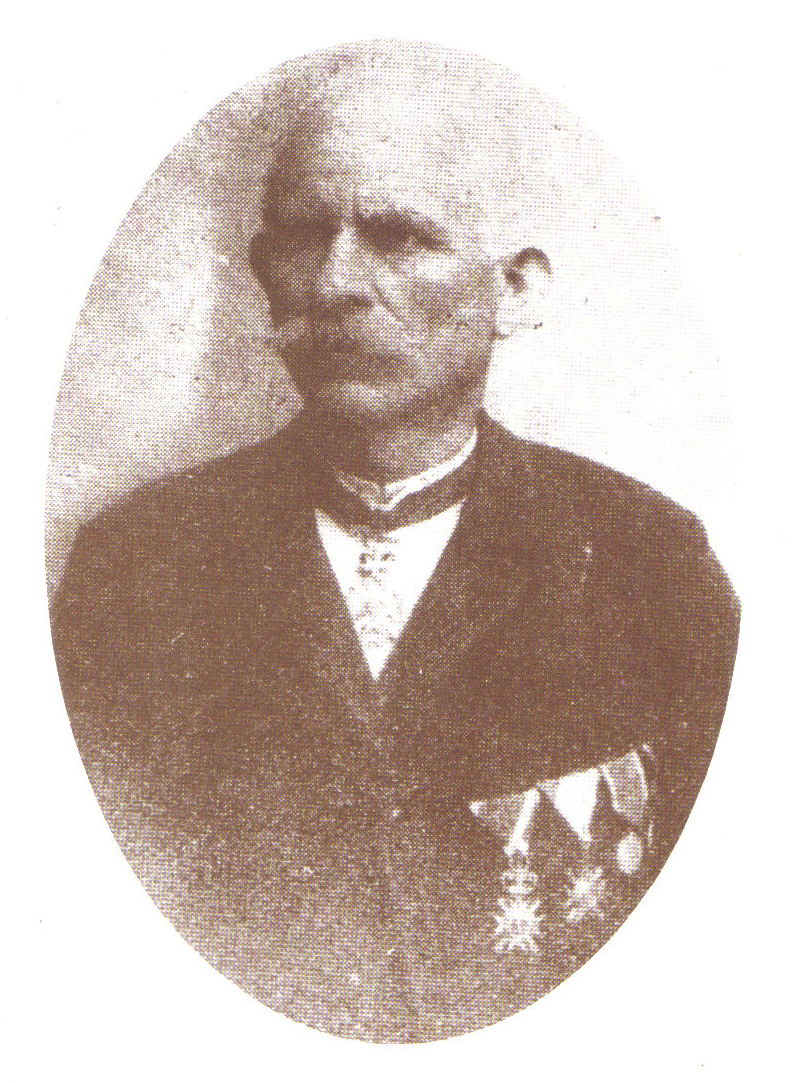
- Kole Rašic with his awards for achievements
- Born: Nikola Rašić ca. 1839; Niš, Ottoman Empire
- Died: August 6, 1898; Niš, Kingdom of Serbia
- Burial place: Old cemetery in Niš
- Spouse(s): Jelena, a Greek woman from Plovdiv
- Military career
- Allegiance: Principality of Serbia
- Branch: Volunteers
- Service years: 1876–1878
- Rank: vojvoda
- Nickname: Kole
- Conflicts: Serbian-Turkish Wars (1876–1878)
- Awards: Takovo Cross
- Memorials: Niš

Nikola Rašić (Serbian Cyrillic: Никола Рашић; ca. 1839 – August 6, 1898), known as Kole Rašić (Коле Рашић) was a Serb revolutionary and guerilla fighter, who led a cheta of 300 men between Niš and Leskovac in Ottoman areas during the Serbian-Turkish Wars (1876–1878). He later became a politician in liberated Niš. He was a merchant by profession, who on his trip to Russia met with Miloš Obrenović and decided to stay in Niš to prepare a future liberation with the help of the Serbian Army. Rašić was one of the founders and organizers of the Niš Committee, established in 1874, with the goal of liberating the Niš Sanjak. His unit joined general Mikhail Chernyayev in 1876.

== Life ==
=== Early ===
Rašić was born in Niş (Niš), part of the Sanjak of Niš, Ottoman Empire (modern Serbia), in ca. 1839. He is said to have been lively by nature and combative. A merchant by profession, he had good connections in the Principality of Serbia and Niš Eyalet. In 1858 he entered Serbia, with the intent to go to Russia, however, the dynastical change made him change his mind. While at Negotin, he heard that Miloš Obrenović would arrive, so he waited for him, and then the two spoke. Rašić, as a respectable Niš citizen, was now sent secretly by the Obrenović government to instigate revolt in the Niš area and beyond against the Ottomans. The planned operation was not implemented in 1860. It proved a long process, and Kole Rašić sought, from then on, the liberation of Niš and then the other regions under Ottoman rule.

=== Revolutionary organization ===
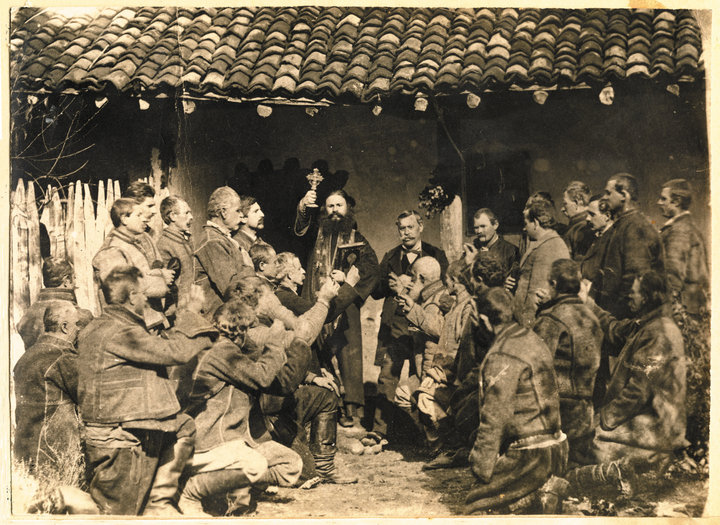
Niš Committee swearing Oath. Kole Rašić is seen kneeling before the priest.

On February 24, 1874, the "Serbian Liberation Committee for the Sanjak of Niš", known simply as the Niš Committee, was founded and organized by Kole Rašić, Todor Milovanović, Dimitrije Đorđević, Milan Novičić, Tasko Tasa Uzunović, Đorđe Pop Manić, Mihajlo Božidarac, and Todor Stanković. They gathered at Božidarac's house, and Orthodox priest Petar Ikonomović swore Oath on the Christian cross and Gospel, reminiscent of the Orašac Assembly (1804). The Niš Committee's plan was a systematic action, through local uprisings weaken the Ottomans, and with gradual arming of the people help liberate the region. Rašić was declared vojvoda. In the Ottomans' eyes, Rašić posed no threat, as he seemed to like drinking and women. However, when the Ottomans thought he was active in the han, he was around in the villages and spoke to the people about the definite liberation that they had waited for centuries. Vojvoda Kole had been sent throughout Dobrič (Donji Milanovac), Toplica and Zaplanje (where Stanko Čavdar and Srndak had revolted, before him). In 1875, the Herzegovina Uprising broke out, giving hope to the people of the Sanjak of Niš. The Ottomans saw through Rašić's real activity, and on June 25, 1875, Kole Rašić and other notable exposed Niš people crossed the border and escaped death, while further action was continued in Niš by other conspirators far less prominent.

By 1876 his unit (cheta) consisted of 300 fighters, and he joined general Mikhail Chernyayev in the battles for the liberation of Niš and the other regions. He had summoned the unit with the help of Miloš Milojević and the neighbouring villages which were still under Ottoman rule. His unit was active between Niš and Leskovac during the Serbo-Turkish War (1876–78).

=== Serbo-Turkish War (1876–78) ===
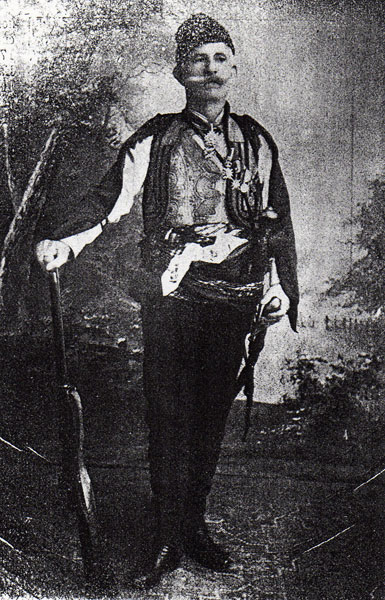
Photograph dated 1876.

The unit's task was to clear the way for the Serbian Army's further penetration into the south. In the First Serbo-Turkish War, Kole Rašić, alongside Todor Stanković, and other notable leaders of the Niš Committee, as well as other people like Miloš Milojević and Vladimir-Vlajko Stojanović and others, helped the Serbian Army.

On December 9, 1877, a combined unit of Serbian soldiers and volunteers liberated the villages of Kočane, Pukovac and the bridge on Morava near Čečina, which had great strategical importance, as thus Niš was cut towards the south. Leskovac entered relations with Kole, after which it was decided that his unit enter the town. His unit and the army vanguard were the first to enter Leskovac, on December 11, 1877, where he held a speech to the liberated people. By order of the High Command he continued to organize an uprising in the direction Vlasotince-Rudare-Turekovac. Kole, who had headed off with his volunteers from liberated Leskovac, were greeted by the Vlasotince rebels who had disarmed 170 Ottomans. After the liberation of these towns, Kole continued his work in helping the guerilla warfare in Old Serbia.

On December 31, 1877, the town officials of Leskovac sent a delegation which included Kole Rašić, five from Leskovac and one from Vlasotince, to greet Prince Milan I when he entered Niš for the first time. During the fight for the liberation of Niš, alongside the Royal Army, some 6,000 volunteers and rebels from the liberated Ottoman areas participated. The 6,000 men were led by Kole Rašić.

After the war, for his work, he was titled vojvoda. After the war, the Serbian military government sent armament and aid to rebels in Kosovo and Macedonia. Christian rebel bands were formed all over the region. Many of those bands, privately organized and aided by the government, were established in Serbia and crossed into Ottoman territory. In that way, Micko Krstić formed a rebel band in 1879 in Niš, with the help of Rašić and the military government in Vranje.

=== Political work ===
After the war, he enter the political life of liberated Niš. As the representative of the Liberal Party, he won the first elections for the National Assembly of the town of Niš and became the state representative of Niš. He won again on the third assembly election (September 7, 1883), however after the annulment of the election results, Progressive Party representative Jovan Mitić won instead.

He was awarded the highest grade of the Takovo Cross — knight (vitez). Kole Rašić was buried at the Old cemetery in Niš.

== Legacy ==
The present Palace of Law in Niš was built in 1909/10 as the court of the county (srez), on the place of the house of Kole Rašić. Vojvoda Živojin Mišić viewed him as a famed hero. Today, a primary school in Niš and two streets, in Niš and Leskovac, are named after him. He is present on the Monument to the Liberators of Niš with priest Ikonomović swearing oath.

== See also ==
- Tasko Tasa Uzunović, commander
- Sima Damnjanović, commander
- Todor Stanković
- Micko Krstić
- Despot Badžović
- Ilija Delija

== Sources ==
- Voja Stojanović-Boke (1941). Zaslužni sinovi: biografije zaslužnih ljudi sa teritorije Istočne Srbije i Pomoravlja. Štamparija "Minerva".
- Milić, Danica (1983). Istorija Niša: Od najstarijih vremena do oslobođenja od Turaka 1878. godine. Gradina.
- Živan Stojković; Slobodanka Stojičić; Hranislav Rakić (1992). Istorija Leskovca. Institut za savremenu istoriju. ISBN 978-86-7403-053-0.
- M. Đ Milićević (1884). Kraljevina Srbija: Đ. Novi Krajevi : Geografija--Orografija-- Hidrografija--Uprava. Sloboda.
  У то дође у Лесковац Коле Рашић из Ниша, с неколико устаника, кои су одметали села од Турака. И он донесе глас да ће српска војска до који дан доћи у Лесковац. Од тих неколиких устаника, који су с Колом Рашићем дошли у ...
- Nikola P. Ilić (1977). Oslobođenje Južne Srbije: 1877-1878. Sloboda. p. 132.
  Свуда су одржали зборове сељака, на којима су говорили Коле Рашић и Влајко Стојановић. Позивали су Србе на оружани устанак против турске власти. Њиков позив прихватила су сва села у Поречју и дигла се на устанак.
- Hadži-Vasiljević, Jovan (1928). Četnička akcija u Staroj Srbiji i Maćedoniji (in Serbian). Belgrade: Sv. Sava.
