= Dimitrije Đorđević =

Dimitrije Đorđević may refer to:

- Dimitrije Đorđević (historian)
- Dimitrije Đorđević, one of the founders of the Niš Committee
