= Schwurhand =

Heraldic motif of an oath-taking hand gesture

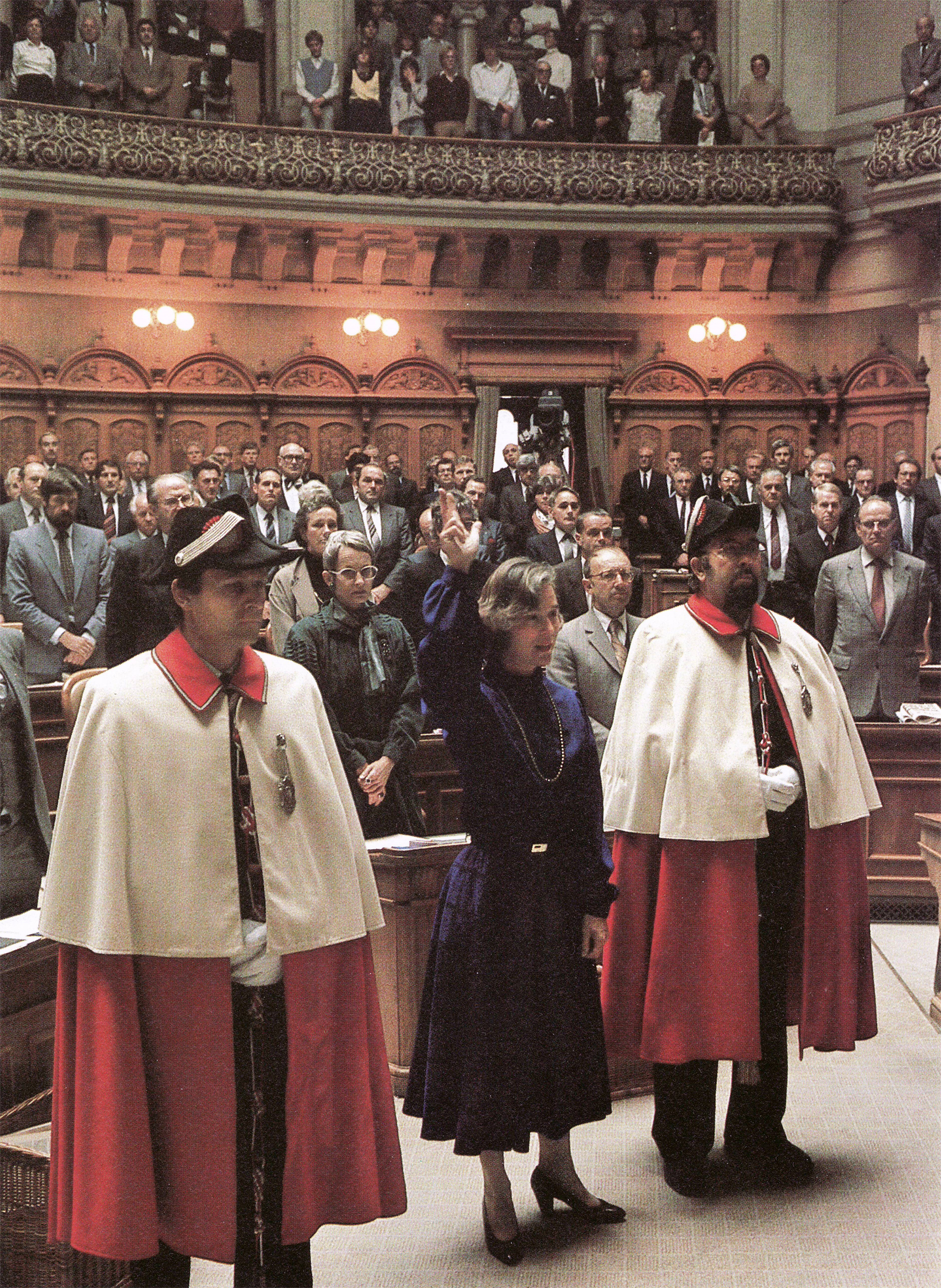
Elisabeth Kopp's oath of office after her election to the Swiss Federal Council in 1984

The Schwurhand (German pronunciation: [ˈʃvuːɐ̯hant], "swear-hand"; Dutch: spreekgebaar) is a traditional hand gesture and heraldic charge (depicting the gesture) that is used in Germanic Europe and neighbouring countries, when swearing an oath in court, in office, or while swearing-in. The right hand is raised, with the index finger and middle finger extended upwards; the last two digits are curled downwards against the palm. The thumb is shown slightly curled or raised.

== Traditional use ==
The use of the gesture dates back many centuries. Recruits of the Pontifical Swiss Guard at the Vatican City use the sign when swearing their oath of allegiance to the Pope, in a ceremony performed on 6 May every year since the Sack of Rome in 1527. The use of the three digits is said to symbolise the Holy Trinity.

=== In Switzerland ===
Depictions of the Rütli Oath or Rütlischwur, the legendary founding oath of the Old Swiss Confederacy in the 13th century, show the participants using this gesture. Newly elected members of the Swiss Federal Assembly and at the Swiss Federal Council traditionally use the Schwurhand for their oath of office (and say 'I swear').

=== In The Netherlands ===
During the inauguration of the Dutch monarch, the new king or queen raises their right hand in the Spreekgebaar while reciting their oath, saying, "Zo waarlijk helpe mij, God Almachtig" ("So truly help me, God Almighty").

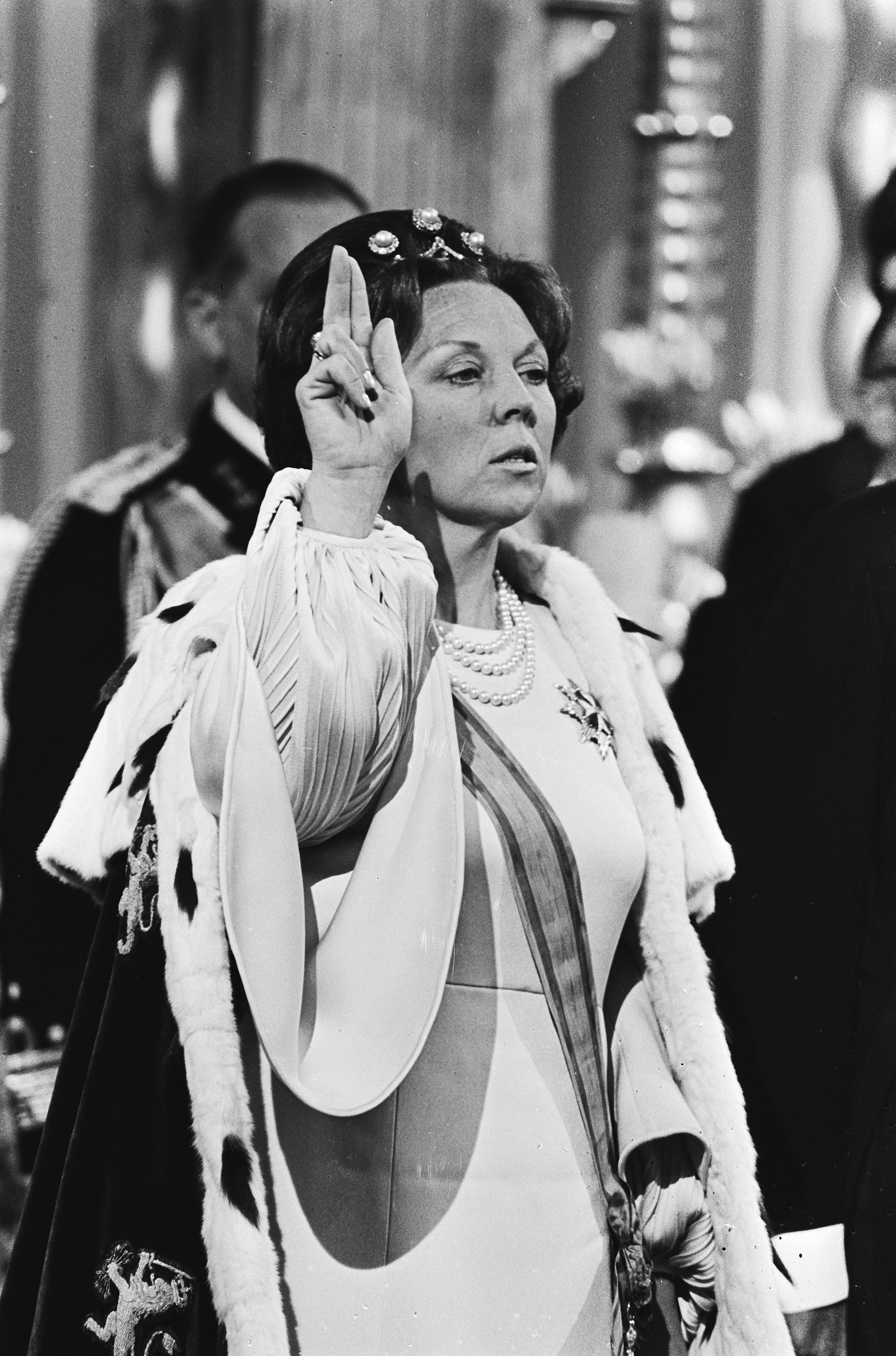
Beatrix displays the Spreekgebaar during her inauguration in 1980

== Heraldic use ==
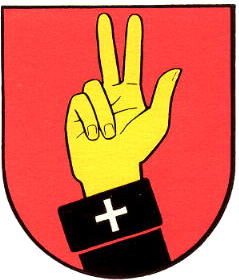
Gommiswald, Switzerland (until 2012)

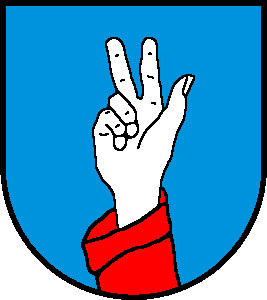
Gempen, Switzerland

Anjala, Finland

Grästorp, Sweden

Hommertshausen, Germany

Oberammergau, Germany

Heiligenkreuz Abbey, Austria

== Military use ==
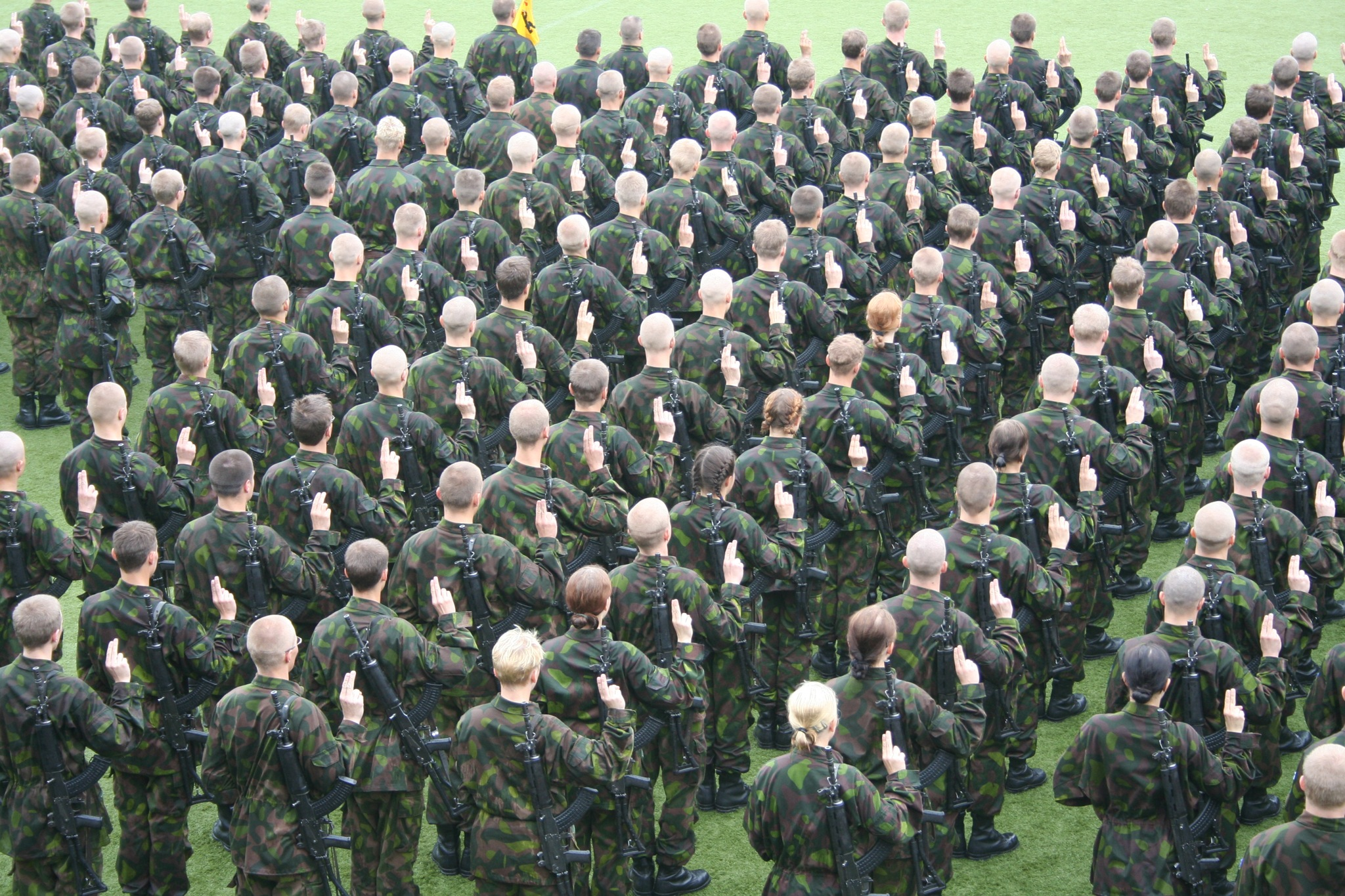
Finnish conscripts and women serving voluntary military service swearing the military oath in 2005

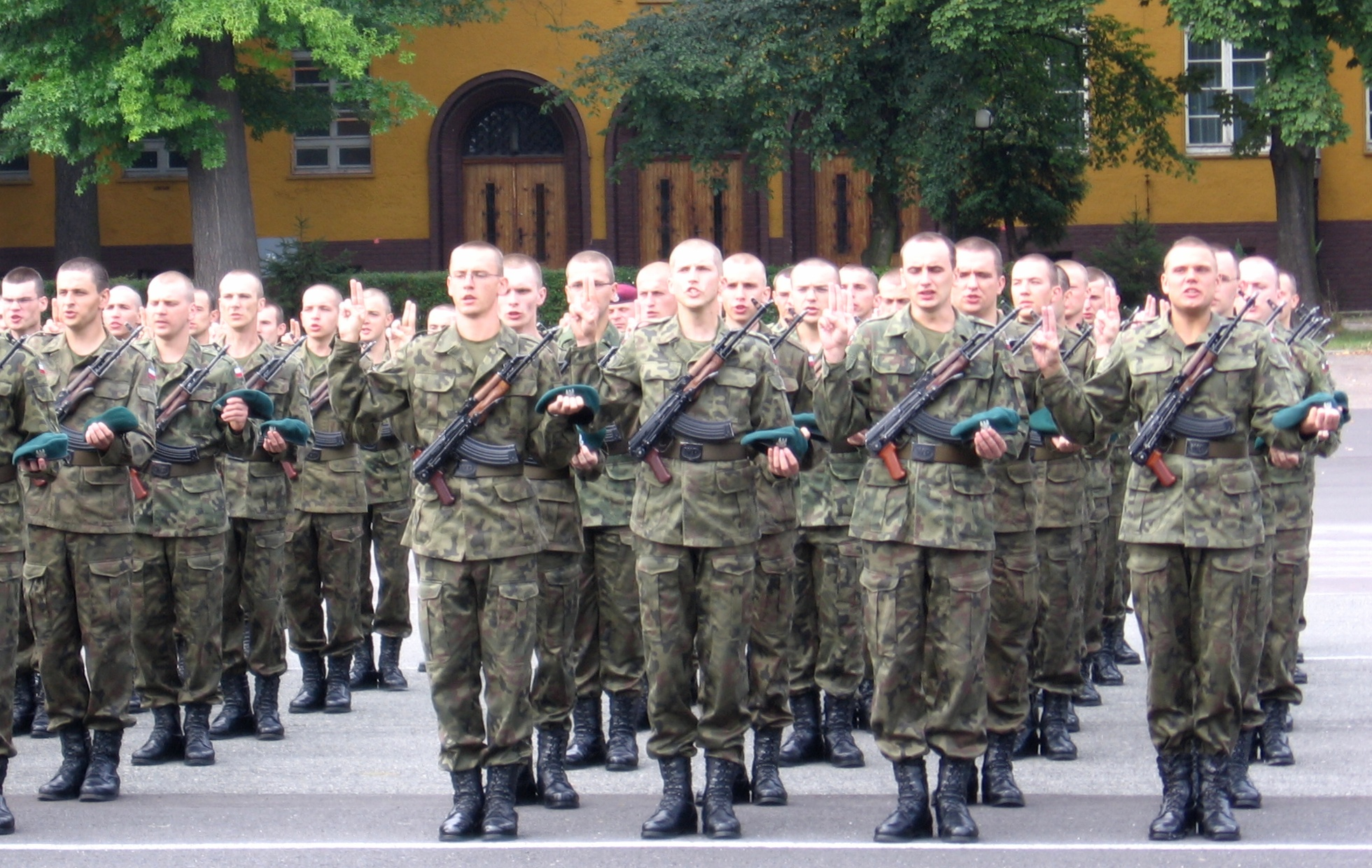
Polish military recruits being sworn in

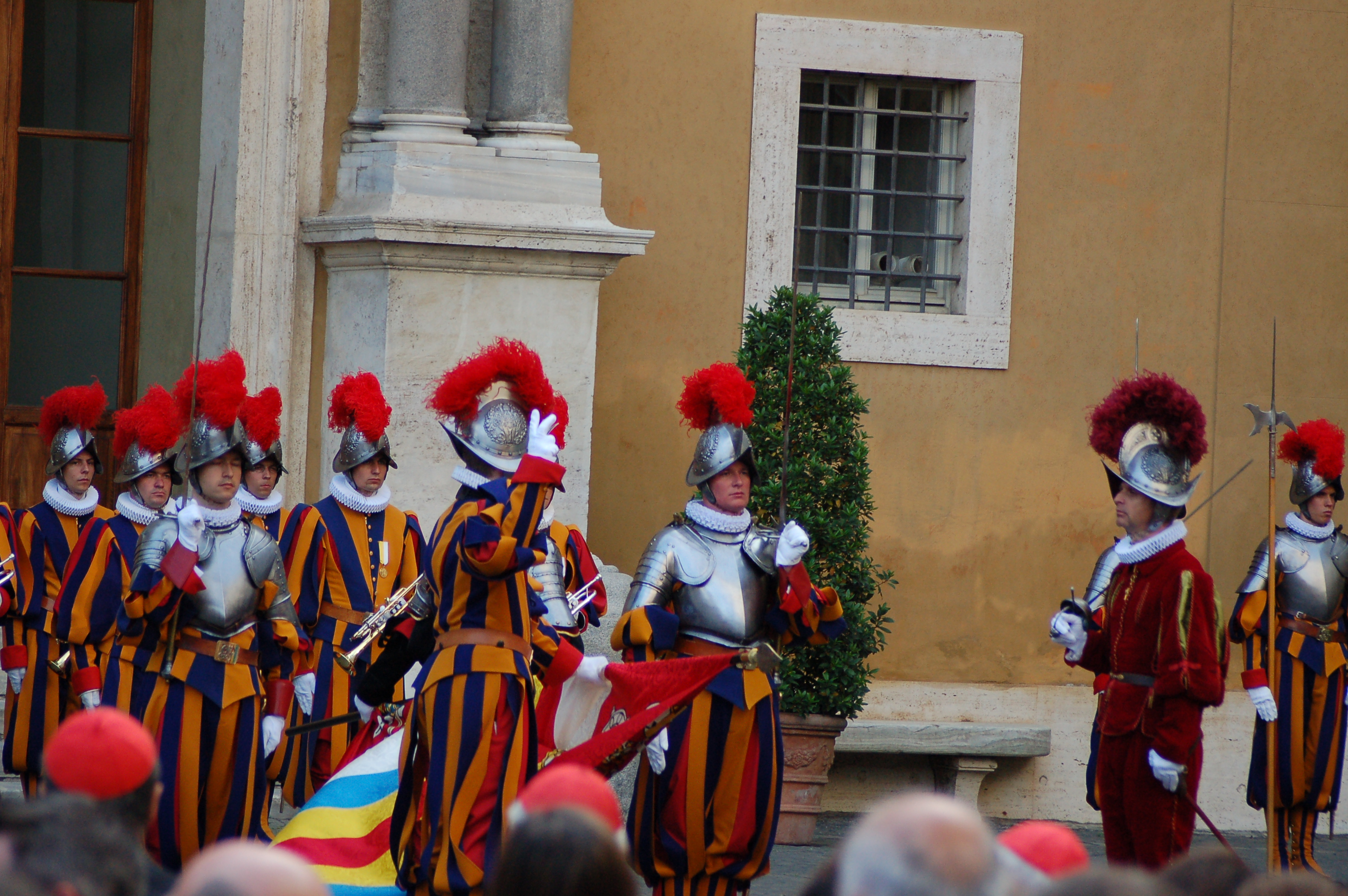
A Swiss Guard recruit being sworn in

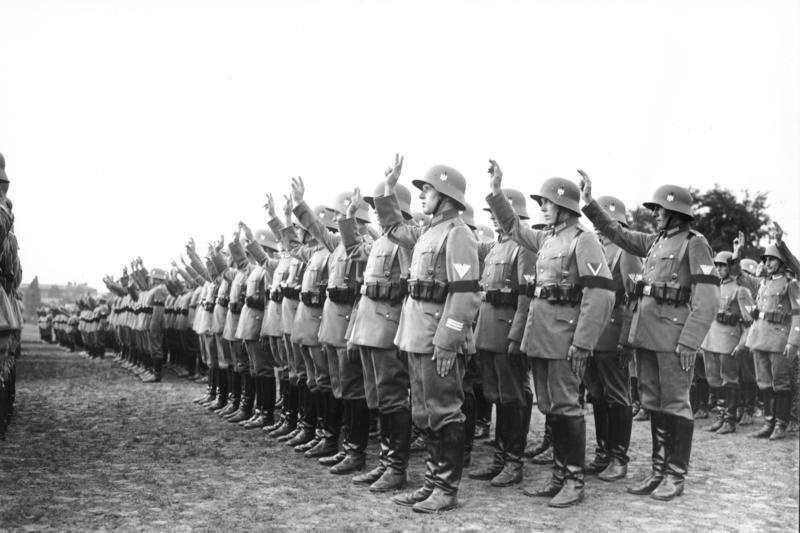
German Reichswehr soldiers swearing the Hitler oath in 1934

Maruli Simanjuntak being sworn in as Deputy Commander of the Indonesian military

== See also ==
- Benediction
- Hand gestures (Oath)
- Three-finger salute (Serbian)
