= Turekovac =

- Town
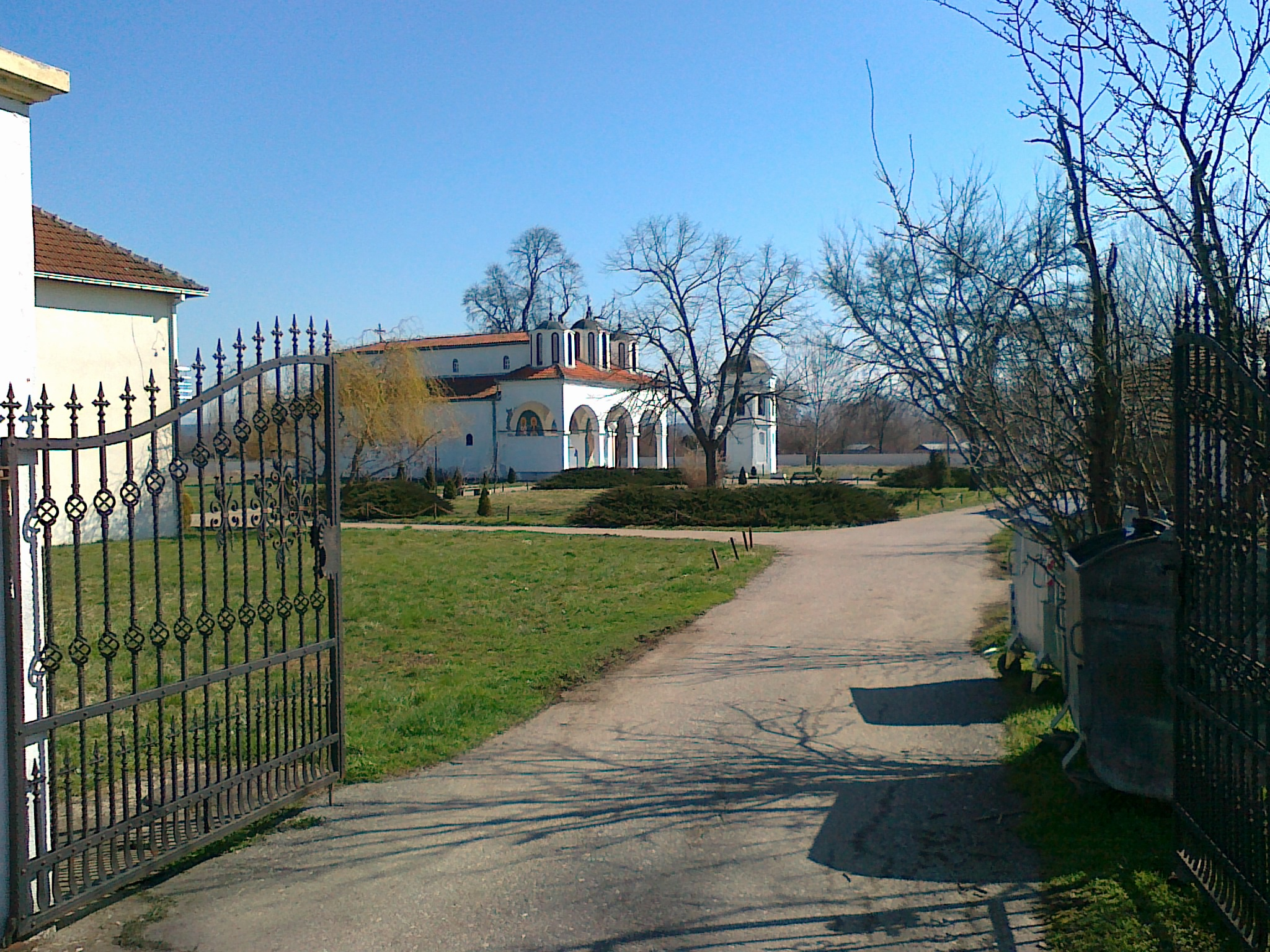

- Location within Serbia
- Coordinates: 42°59′00″N 21°52′47″E
- Country: Serbia
- District: Jablanica District
- Municipality: Leskovac

Population (2002)
  - Total: 1,794
- Time zone: UTC+1 (CET)
  - Summer (DST): UTC+2 (CEST)

Turekovac is a town in the municipality of Leskovac, Serbia. According to the 2002 census, the town has a population of 1794 people.
