= Kočane =

Kočane Кочане
- Village
- Location within Serbia
- Coordinates: 43°11′04″N 21°50′10″E
- Country: Serbia
- Municipality: Doljevac
- Time zone: UTC+1 (CET)
  - Summer (DST): UTC+2 (CEST)

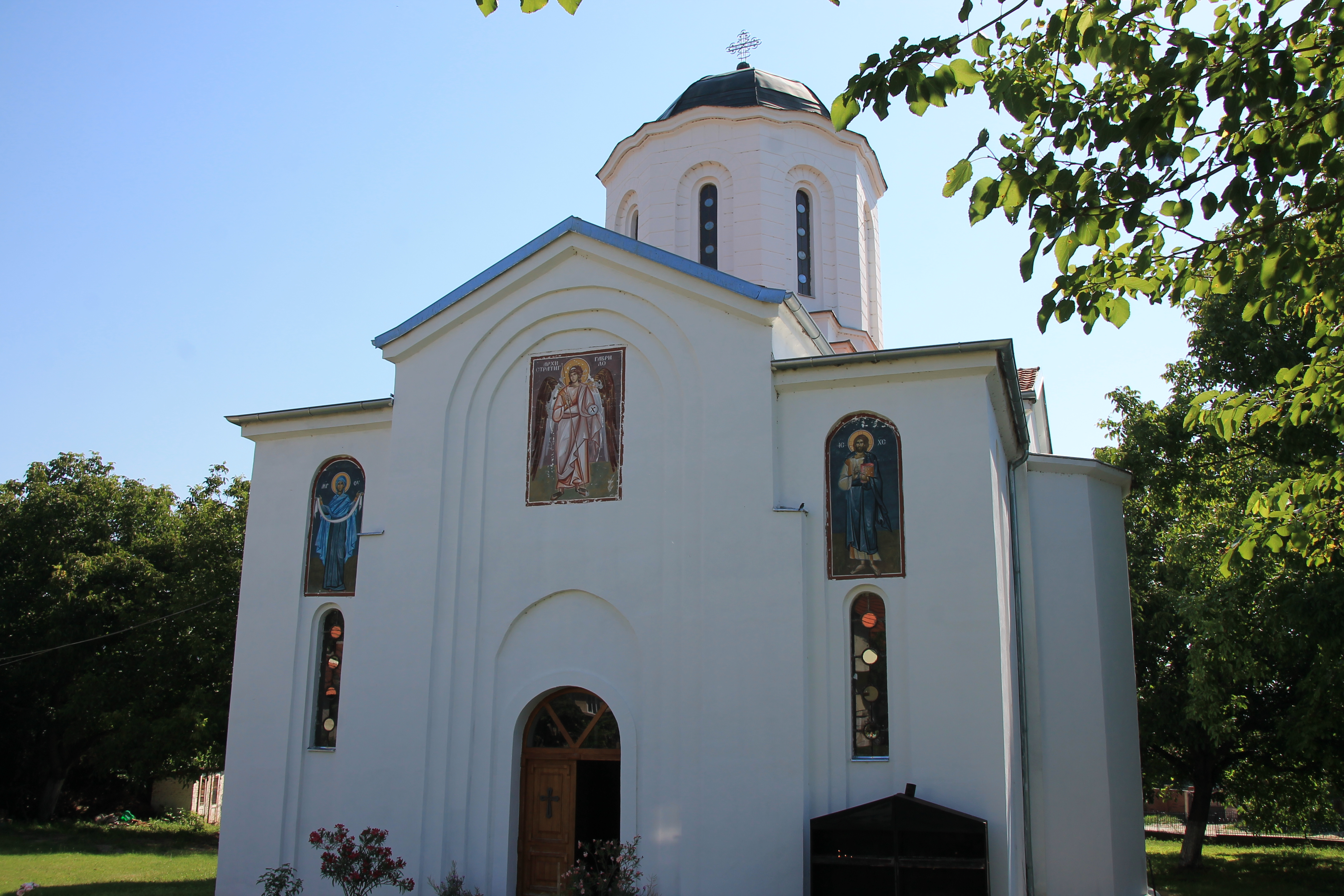
Church in Kočane

Kočane (Serbian Cyrillic: Кочане) is a village situated in Doljevac municipality in Serbia.
