= Niš Committee =

Organization

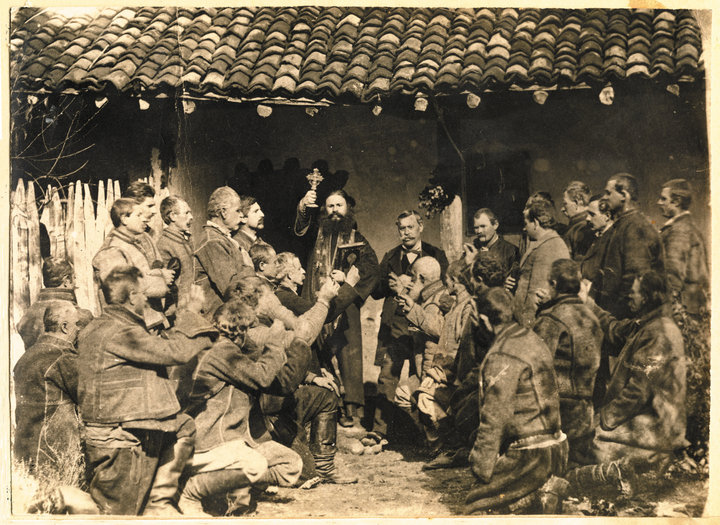
- Photograph of the Niš Committee swearing oath
- Formation: 24 September 1874
- Type: secret revolutionary organisation
- Purpose: Liberation of Niš and its surroundings and merging with Principality of Serbia
- Location: Niš
- Key people: see list

The Serbian Liberation Committee of the Sanjak of Niš, known as the Niš Committee (Serbian: Нишки комитет/Niški komitet) was a Serb revolutionary organisation (national liberation movement) based in Niš, established in 1874, with the aim of not only liberating Niš and its immediate surroundings, but also the whole of the Sanjak of Niš, including Leskovac, Pirot, Vranje, Breznica, and Tran, from the hands of the Ottoman Empire.

== Background ==
- Serbian Revolution
- 1832/1833 uprisings in Serbia, whose nahija were merged into the Principality of Serbia
- Niš rebellion (1841)
- Serb revolutionary organizations

== History ==
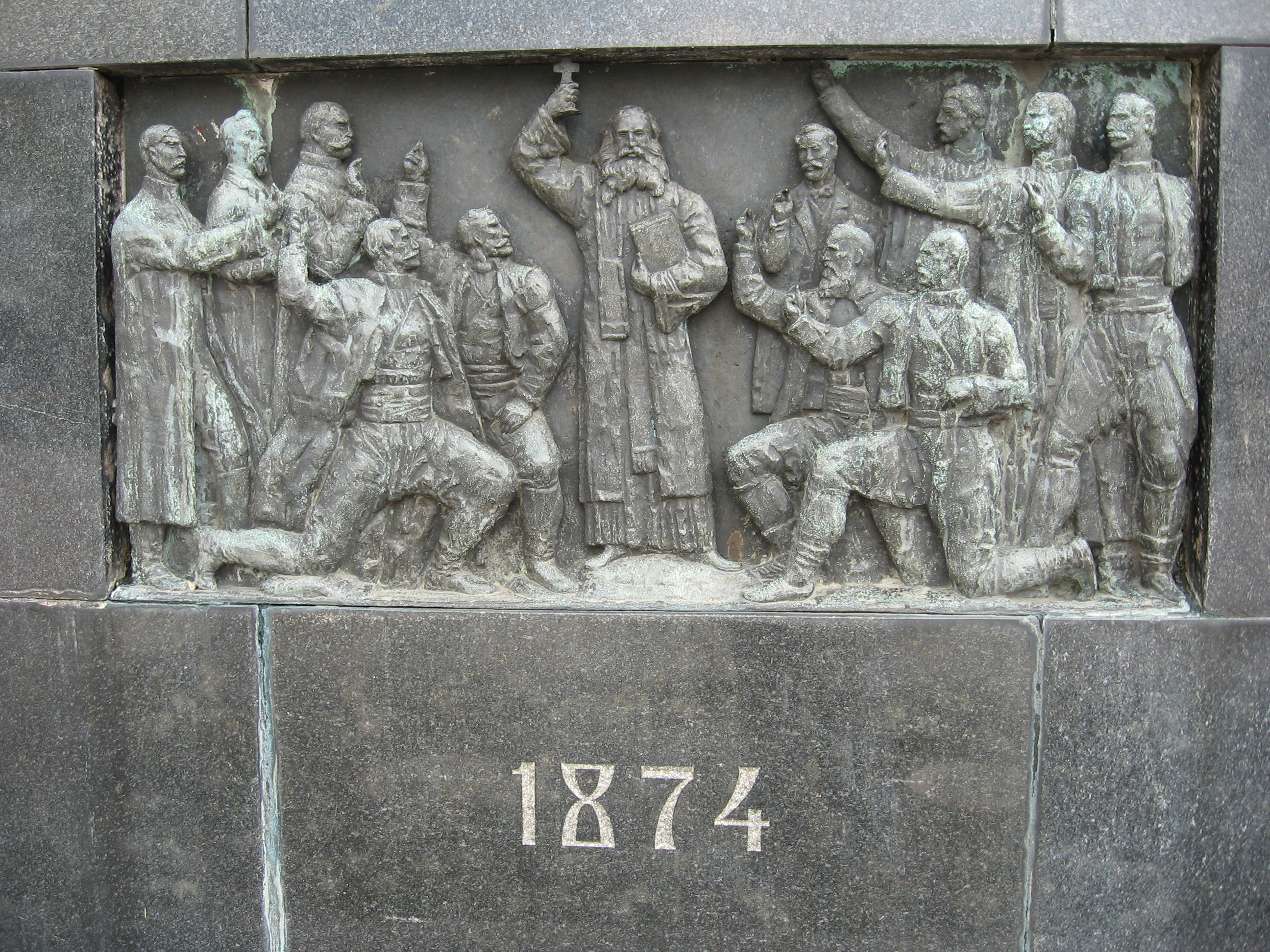
Monument to the liberators of Niš - detail (one side) depicting the establishment of the committee.

On February 24, 1874, the "Serbian Liberation Committee for the Sanjak of Niš", known simply as the Niš Committee, was founded and organized by Kole Rašić, Todor Milovanović, Dimitrije Đorđević, Milan Novičić, Tasko Tasa Uzunović, Đorđe Pop-Manić, Mihajlo Božidarac, and Todor Stanković. They gathered at Božidarac's house, and Orthodox priest Petar Ikonomović swore Oath on the Christian cross and Gospel, reminiscent of the Orašac Assembly (1804). Rašić was declared vojvoda.

So together, brothers, and the Almighty shall help us all in his mercy, and soon permit us to weave the triumphal flag of our only faithful IV Obrenović on the Niš fortification. Hooray! Hooray! Hooray! Long live our beloved knightly Prince Milan M. Obrenović IV. Long live Mother Serbia!

— Petar Ikonomović, priest of Niš (February 24, 1874)

== Aftermath ==
- Kumanovo Uprising

== See also ==
- Serb revolutionary organizations

== Sources ==
- Lovrić, Bruno (1928). Istorija Niša (in Serbo-Croatian) (Digitalized ed.). Niš.
- Milić, Danica (1983). Istorija Niša: Od najstarijih vremena do oslobođenja od Turaka 1878. godine. Gradina.
- Milićević, Milan Đ. (1884). Kraljevina Srbija. Beograd.
- Nacionalno politička akcija Nišlija za oslobođenje 1860-1877 U:Istorija Niša I, strana 297–304, Gradina i Prosveta Niš, 1983.
- Stojančević, Vladimir (1998). Srpski narod u Staroj Srbiji u Velikoj istočnoj krizi 1876-1878. Službeni list SRJ. ISBN 978-86-355-0390-5.
