= Petar Ikonomović =

Serbian Orthodox priest

Petar Ikonomović (Serbian Cyrillic: Петар Икономовић; 16 June 1849 - 29 January 1914) was a Serbian Orthodox priest from Niš, one of the leading men of the Niš Committee and a national fighter for the liberation of Niš from the Ottomans, a participant in several wars fought in southeastern Serbia in the second half of the 19th century.
