= Ljubivoje Slavković =

Serbian politician

Ljubivoje Slavković (Serbian Cyrillic: Љубивоје Славковић; born 25 June 1952) is a politician in Serbia. He served in the National Assembly of Serbia in 2001 as a member of Social Democracy (Socijaldemokratija, SD). He later joined the Serbian Progressive Party (Srpska napredna stranka, SNS) and was the deputy mayor of Niš from 2012 to 2016.

== Early life and career ==
Slavković was born in the village of Štavalj in the municipality of Sjenica, in what was then the People's Republic of Serbia in the People's Federal Republic of Yugoslavia. He graduated high school in the community and received a degree from the University of Niš Faculty of Law. His first employment was for Miroč-Kladovo, and he later managed a number of businesses in Niš.

== Politician ==
Slavković first became politically active in 1974. He was a candidate for the Niš electoral division in the 1992 Serbian parliamentary election, appearing in the eighth position on an independent electoral list led by Pavić Obradović, a former Socialist Party of Serbia (Socijalistička partija Srbije, SPS) politician who had resigned due to disagreements with Slobodan Milošević. The list did not cross the electoral threshold to win representation in the assembly. Obradović later co-founded Social Democracy, and Slavković joined the new party, receiving the fourth position on its list in Niš for the 1997 parliamentary election. This list, too, did not win any mandates.

Social Democracy later participated in the Alliance for Change and the Democratic Opposition of Serbia (Demokratska opozicija Srbije, DOS), both of which were broad and ideologically diverse coalitions of parties opposed to Slobodan Milošević's continued rule. Slavković spoke at a major opposition rally in Pirot in August 1999, calling on Milošević to save Serbia by leaving office.

Milošević was defeated by DOS candidate Vojislav Koštunica in the 2000 Yugoslavian presidential election, an event that brought about watershed changes in Serbian politics. Slavković appeared in the fourth position (out of five) on the DOS's electoral list for Niš in the concurrent Yugoslavian parliamentary election and missed election when the list won three seats. He was, however, elected to the City Assembly of Niš for the city's third constituency in the 2000 Serbian local elections, which also occurred at the same time. The DOS won a landslide victory in the city, and he initially served as a supporter of the administration.

=== Parliamentarian and mayoral candidate (2000–04) ===
Serbia's parliament approved a new transitional government after Milošević's defeat in the Yugoslavian election, and a Serbian parliamentary election was called for December 2000. For this election, the entire country was counted as a single electoral division and all mandates were distributed to candidates on successful lists at the discretion of the sponsoring parties or coalitions, irrespective of numerical order. Slavković appeared in the fifty-first position on the DOS's list and was awarded a mandate when the coalition won a landslide majority with 176 out of 250 seats. He took his seat when the assembly convened in January 2001 and served as a government supporter.

Slavković criticized the DOS leadership in Niš in February 2001, saying that the coalition was losing its cohesion and becoming dominated by two leading city officials. While he did not mention any names, it was widely assumed that one of his targets was former mayor Zoran Živković, a prominent figure in the Democratic Party (Demokratska stranka, DS). These comments notwithstanding, Slavković was appointed as the director of the JKP "Toplana" shortly thereafter.

Social Democracy became divided into rival factions later in 2001, due to accusations against party leader Vuk Obradović. Slavković sided with Obradović's wing of the party, which lost a power struggle to the wing led by Slobodan Orlić. Under Serbia's electoral law at the time, Slavković was expelled from the assembly on 20 September 2001, having lost his party membership. (The Constitutional Court of Serbia later ruled that he had been unjustly removed from office and provided him with financial compensation for lost wages.) Slavković was also removed as the director of Toplana in October 2002; he claimed that Živković and fellow DS member Boško Ristić were behind his dismissal and also said that he had made enemies by preventing an "energy mafia" from entering the company.

After a formal party split, Vuk Obradović became the leader of a smaller, reconstituted version of Social Democracy in 2002. Slavković aligned himself with this party and appeared in the 208th position on the "Defense and Justice" electoral list led by Obradović and Borivoje Borović in the 2003 Serbian parliamentary election. The list did not cross the electoral threshold. Slavković later had a falling out with Obradović and left Social Democracy in 2004.

Slavković appears to have stood down from the city assembly at some point in early 2004.

Serbia introduced the direct election of mayors in the 2004 Serbian local elections, and Slavković ran for mayor of Niš as the candidate of an independent group called For Niš. He received less than two per cent of the vote and afterwards spent a few years away from politics. He served as the director of "Blok signal doo" Niš and became active in the local media, hosting on RTV Belle Amie and writing for Narodne novine. Slavković became a member of the SNS on its formation in 2008.

=== Deputy Mayor (2012-16) ===
Serbia's electoral laws were reformed in 2011, such that all mandates were awarded to candidates on successful lists in numerical order. Slavković received the 101st position on the SNS's Let's Get Serbia Moving list in the 2012 Serbian parliamentary election and missed election when the list won seventy-three seats. He also appeared in the eighth position on the party's list for Niš in the concurrent 2012 Serbian local elections and was re-elected to the city assembly when the list won seventeen mandates. The Progressives formed a coalition government in the city after the election with the SPS and the United Regions of Serbia (Ujedinjeni regioni Srbije, URS), and in September 2012 Slavković was chosen as the city's deputy mayor.

Slavković made comments against Serbia's LGBT population in a Facebook conversation in 2013, describing homosexuality as "a serious psycho-physiological disorder of the human being" and saying "my attitude towards gays and lesbians is even more orthodox than the attitude of the Serbian Orthodox Church." These statements were criticized, although no action was taken against him. Slavković subsequently made disparaging comments against Južne vesti, the news outlet that reported the Facebook exchange, at one point describing its leaders as "foreign mercenaries."

In December 2013, Slavković became the owner of Blok signal. This became a source of controversy, and Serbia's Anti-Corruption Agency issued a misdemeanor report against him for buying the privatized company without the necessary consent. (Slavković had contended that he did not buy the company but instead received it free of charge.) The company went bankrupt in July 2014.

Slavković appeared in the 179th position on the SNS's electoral list in the 2014 parliamentary election and missed election when the list won 158 mandates.

It was reported in October 2014 that Slavković had been expelled from the Progressive Party by virtue of holding a dual mandate, as deputy mayor and as a member of the assembly of the "Southeast" company, in defiance of the party's wishes. This claim has since been repeated in several media reports; Niš mayor Zoran Perišić, however, clarified that Slavković had not actually been expelled from the party, although a proposal had been brought forward to this end.

In January 2015, Slavković said that utility companies in Niš would not be able to increase prices without first carrying out rationalization programs. He was not a candidate in the 2016 local elections and his term as deputy mayor came to an end in that year.

== 2021 arrest ==
Slavković returned to work for Blok signal after leaving office. He was arrested in March 2021 on corruption charges involving his role at the company. It was alleged that he and another company official received cars from company funds without proper approval or the knowledge of the owner. The charges have not been proven in court.

== Electoral record ==
=== Local (City of Niš) ===
2004 City of Niš local election Mayor of Niš - First and Second Round Results
Candidate	Party	Votes	%	Votes	%
Smiljko Kostić	Political Organization for Democratic Change "New Serbia"–Velimir Ilić	15,115	23.68	38,291	63.63
Goran Ćirić (incumbent)	Democratic Party–Boris Tadić	18,640	29.21	21,887	36.37
Dragoljub Stamenković	Serbian Radical Party–Tomislav Nikolić	8,220	12.88		
Branislav Jovanović	G17 Plus	6,774	10.61		
Goran Ilić	Democratic Party of Serbia–Vojislav Koštunica	5,356	8.39		
Zoran Bojanić	Strength of Serbia Movement–Bogoljub Karić	4,685	7.34		
Vlastimir Đokić	Socialist Party of Serbia–Tomislav Jovanović	3,692	5.78		
Ljubivoje Slavković	Citizens' Group: For Niš	see below			
Sima Radulović	Citizens' Group: League for Niš	see below			
Total valid votes		63,824	100	60,178	100
