= Vlastimir Jovanović (politician) =

Serbian politician (1951–2008)

Vlastimir Jovanović (Serbian Cyrillic: Властимир Јовановић; (1 September 1951, Niš - 21 June 2008, Niš) is a politician in Serbia. He has served in the National Assembly of Serbia and the Assembly of Serbia and Montenegro as a member of the far-right Serbian Radical Party (Srpska radikalna stranka, SRS).

== Private career ==
Jovanović is a professor of world literature based in Niš. Father of three children. He has been a member of the Radical Party's Central Fatherland Administration.

== Politician ==
Jovanović became chair of the Radical Party's board in Niš in the late 1990s. During the early period of the Kosovo War in November 1998, he accused international forces in Kosovo and Metohija of permitting the Kosovo Liberation Army (KLA) to act with impunity. He was quoted as saying, "The international community is allowing the terrorists to lay waste to Kosmet and the situation is becoming increasingly similar to that of March, before the security forces took action to square up with the terrorists."

Jovanović led the SRS's electoral list for Niš in the 2000 Yugoslavian parliamentary election. The party did not win any seats in the division. He also sought election to the City Assembly of Niš for the city's fifteenth district in the concurrent 2000 Serbian local elections and, like all Radical Party candidates in the city in this cycle, was defeated.

The 2000 Yugoslavian election saw Vojislav Koštunica defeat Slobodan Milošević for the federation's presidency, an event that precipitated widespread changes in Serbian politics. A transitional government was established in Serbia, and a new parliamentary election was called for December 2000. As the result of reforms enacted prior to the election, all of Serbia was counted as a single electoral division, and all mandates were awarded to candidates on successful lists at the discretion of the sponsoring parties or coalitions, irrespective of numerical order. Jovanović received the fifty-sixth position on the Radical Party's electoral list and was not awarded a mandate when the party won twenty-three seats.

Jovanović received the forty-ninth position on the SRS's list in the 2003 parliamentary election and, on this occasion, was awarded a mandate when the list won eighty-two seats. He took his seat when the assembly convened in January 2004. Although the Radicals won more seats than any other party, they fell well short of a majority and ultimately served in opposition.

His term in the national assembly was brief. By virtue of its performance in the 2003 parliamentary election, the Radicals had the right to appoint thirty delegates to the assembly of Serbia and Montenegro. Jovanović was one of the delegates chosen; by virtue of accepting this position, he was required to resign his seat in the republican parliament. He served in the federal parliament until 2006, when the state union dissolved as a result of Montenegro's declaration of independence.

Jovanović also led the SRS's list for the Niš city assembly in the 2004 local elections and was elected when the list won twelve mandates. In this role, he served in opposition to mayor Smiljko Kostić's administration. He also ran for mayor of the Niš municipality of Medijana in 2004 and was defeated in the second round by Dragoslav Ćirković, the candidate of the Democratic Party (Demokratska stranka, DS).

Vlastimir died after a short illness in June 2008.

== Electoral record ==
=== Local (City of Niš) ===
2004 City of Niš local election: Mayor of Medijana
Candidate	Party	First round		Second round	
Candidate	Party	Votes	%	Votes	%
Dragoslav Ćirković	Democratic Party–Boris Tadić	8,216	35.15	13,799	59.22
Vlastimir Jovanović	Serbian Radical Party–Tomislav Nikolić	3,585	15.34	9,501	40.78
Rade Arsić	information missing	2,734	11.70		
Miodrag Medar	Democratic Party of Serbia–Vojislav Koštunica	2,565	10.97		
Radosav Tanasković	information missing	2,191	9.37		
Biljana Živković	Socialist Party of Serbia	1,923	8.23		
Dragan Stevanović	Political Organization for Democratic Change New Serbia–Velimir Ilić	1,311	5.61		
Ratko Đenić	information missing	848	3.63		
Total		23,373	100.00	23,300	100.00
