= Dragoljub Stamenković =

Serbian politician (1954–2025)

Dragoljub Stamenković (Serbian Cyrillic: Драгољуб Стаменковић; 18 September 1954 – 19 April 2025) was a Serbian politician. He served in the National Assembly of Serbia from 1994 to 2007 as a member of the far-right Serbian Radical Party (Srpska radikalna stranka, SRS).

== Private career ==
Stamenković was a traffic technician based in Niš.

== Politician ==
=== During the Milošević years (1993–2000) ===
Stamenković received the lead position on the Radical Party's electoral list for the Niš division in the 1993 Serbian parliamentary election and was elected when the list won four mandates. (From 1992 to 2000, Serbia's electoral law stipulated that one-third of parliamentary mandates would be assigned to candidates from successful lists in numerical order, while the remaining two-thirds would be distributed amongst other candidates at the discretion of the sponsoring parties. Stamenković received an automatic mandate by virtue of his position.) He took his seat when the assembly convened in January 1994. Serbian president Slobodan Milošević's Socialist Party of Serbia (Socijalistička partija Srbije, SPS) won the election, and the Radicals served in opposition for the term that followed.

Stamenković was again given the lead position on the SRS's list for Niš in the 1997 parliamentary election and was re-elected when the list again won four mandates. The Socialists again won the election, and the Radicals initially continued to serve in opposition. On 24 March 1998, the SPS organized a new coalition government that included the Radicals and the Yugoslav Left (Jugoslovenska Levica, JUL). On 26 May 1998, Stamenković was appointed a deputy speaker of the national assembly.

Amid growing tensions between Serbia and the United States of America in 1998, Stamenković remarked that if the Federal Republic of Yugoslavia was bombed without a United Nations Security Council decision, it would "mark the end of the United Nations and the existing balance of power on the international scene." He added that Russia "had realized" the breakup of Yugoslavia would be a prelude to the breakup of Russia and warned that "despite Russia's economic weakness, it still has huge military and nuclear potential." In early March 1999, shortly before the start of the NATO bombing of Yugoslavia, he said that "everything should be done to make the lives of those have their military troops deployed in the Republika Srpska and who are behaving as occupiers unbearable." He specifically called for civil resistance and non-cooperation. He also called on the Serbian government to "wipe out" those whom he described as separatists, bandits, and terrorists in Kosovo, for the purpose of "protecting all citizens."

In October 1999, after the conclusion of NATO's bombing campaign, Stamenković met with a delegation from Iraq led by Harith Al-Khashali, the Ba'ath Party's committee chair for international relations. Stamenković said that Serbia was "bitter" over recent American bombings of civilians in Iraq and said, "We know that the Iraqi people can handle this and that the evil called the US and the new world order will disappear one day." He also described Serbia under Milošević as "the only free state in Europe, like Iraq [in the Middle East]."

In April 2000, he accused the Democratic Party (Demokratska stranka, DS) and Serbian Renewal Movement (Srpski pokret obnove, SPO) of "carrying out synchronized attacks against the Yugoslav Army and police" and of compiling lists of indictees for the International Criminal Tribunal for the former Yugoslavia (ICTY). The following month, he condemned Niš mayor Zoran Živković of the Democratic Party for chairing a city hall meeting wearing an Otpor! t-shirt; Stamenković claimed this was proof of the DS seeking to provoke unrest and come to power by force. He supported the Serbian government's decision to take over RTV Studio B during the same time period, accusing the station of having made frequent calls for violence.

=== After the fall of Milošević (2000–2012) ===
Slobodan Milošević was defeated by Vojislav Koštunica of the Democratic Opposition of Serbia (Demokratska opozicija Srbije, DOS) in the 2000 Yugoslavian presidential election, a watershed event in Serbian and Yugoslavian politics. The Radicals left the Serbian government on 24 October 2000 and returned to opposition, and a new Serbian parliamentary election was called for December.

For the 2000 parliamentary election, the entire country was counted as a single electoral division and all mandates were awarded to candidates on successful lists at the discretion of the sponsoring parties or coalitions, irrespective of numerical order. Stamenković was given the ninth position on the SRS's list and was awarded a mandate for a third term after the party won twenty-three seats. The DOS won a landslide majority in the election and the Radicals again served in opposition. Stamenković's term as deputy speaker ended when the new assembly convened in January 2001.

He was again given the ninth position on the SRS's list in the 2003 Serbian parliamentary election and was selected for another mandate when the list won eighty-two seats. Although the Radicals emerged as the largest party in the assembly after the election, they fell well short of a majority and ultimately continued to serve in opposition. During his last term in parliament, Stamenković was the chair of the transport and communications community and a member of the administrative board and the foreign affairs committee.

Serbia introduced the direct election of mayors in the 2004 Serbian elections. Stamenković ran as the SRS's candidate in Niš and finished third. He also received the tenth position on the party's list for the City Assembly of Niš and was given a local mandate when the party won twelve out of sixty-one seats. As at the republic level, the Radicals served in opposition in the city.

Stamenković was not a candidate in the 2007 Serbian parliamentary election and his term in the national assembly came to an end that year. Serbia ended the direct election of mayors in the 2008 local elections; Stamenković appeared on the SRS's list and was given another mandate when it won eighteen seats. Although the Radicals technically won a plurality victory in the assembly vote, the DS and SPS formed a coalition government in the city and the SRS was yet again in opposition.

The Radicals experienced a serious split later in 2008, with several members joining the more moderate Serbian Progressive Party (Srpska napredna stranka, SNS) under the leadership of Tomislav Nikolić and Aleksandar Vučić. Stamenković remained with the Radicals.

He chaired a city committee responsible for naming streets and squares in the 2008–12 term. In 2009, he led a successful effort to have a boulevard named after the legendary Serbian Roma singer Šaban Bajramović.

Serbia's electoral laws were again changed in 2011, such that all mandates were awarded in numerical order to candidates on successful lists. Stamenković appeared in the nineteenth position on the Radical Party's list for Niš in the 2012 local elections. The party, weakened by the split four years earlier, failed to cross the electoral threshold to win representation in the assembly. He never returned to political life thereafter.

== Death ==
Stamenković died after a short illness in Niš, on 19 April 2025, at the age of 70.

== Electoral record ==
=== Local (City of Niš) ===
2004 City of Niš local election Mayor of Niš - First and Second Round Results
Candidate	Party	Votes	%	Votes	%
Smiljko Kostić	Political Organization for Democratic Change "New Serbia"–Velimir Ilić	15,115	23.68	38,291	63.63
Goran Ćirić (incumbent)	Democratic Party–Boris Tadić	18,640	29.21	21,887	36.37
Dragoljub Stamenković	Serbian Radical Party–Tomislav Nikolić	8,220	12.88		
Branislav Jovanović	G17 Plus	6,774	10.61		
Goran Ilić	Democratic Party of Serbia–Vojislav Koštunica	5,356	8.39		
Zoran Bojanić	Strength of Serbia Movement–Bogoljub Karić	4,685	7.34		
Vlastimir Đokić	Socialist Party of Serbia–Tomislav Jovanović	3,692	5.78		
Ljubivoje Slavković	Citizens' Group: For Niš	see below			
Sima Radulović	Citizens' Group: League for Niš	see below			
Total valid votes		63,824	100	60,178	100
