= Sima Radulović =

Serbian politician

Sima Radulović (Serbian Cyrillic: Сима Радуловић; born 1955) is a lawyer and politician in Serbia. He was a member of the National Assembly of Serbia from 2001 to 2004 and held high office in the City of Niš during the same period. During his political career, Radulović was a member of the Civic Alliance of Serbia (Građanski savez Srbije, GSS).

== Early life and career ==
Radulović was born in Niš, in what was then the People's Republic of Serbia in the Federal People's Republic of Yugoslavia. He graduated from the University of Niš Faculty of Law and was a member of the non-governmental organization G17 Plus prior to its registration as a political party.

== Politician ==
In 2000, the GSS joined the Democratic Opposition of Serbia (Demokratska opozicija Srbije, DOS), a broad and ideologically diverse coalition of parties opposed to Slobodan Milošević's administration. Milošević was defeated by DOS candidate Vojislav Koštunica in the 2000 Yugoslavian presidential election, a watershed moment in Serbian politics. In the concurrent 2000 Serbian local elections, Radulović won election to the City Assembly of Niš as a DOS/GSS candidate in the twenty-fifth division. The DOS parties won a landslide victory in city and afterwards formed a new coalition government. The GSS took part in the administration, and Radulović was appointed as a vice-president of the city's executive board, initially with responsibility for economy and finance and later with responsibility for civil administration reform.

Following Milošević's defeat in the Yugoslavian election, a transitional government was established in Serbia and a new Serbian parliamentary election was called for December 2000. Radulović received the seventy-first position on the DOS's electoral list and was awarded a mandate after the coalition won a landslide victory with 176 out of 250 mandates. (From 2000 to 2011, all mandates in Serbian parliamentary elections were distributed to candidates on successful lists at the discretion of the sponsoring parties or coalitions, irrespective of numerical order. Radulović did not automatically receive a mandate by virtue of his list position, though he was included in the GSS delegation all the same.) He took his seat when the assembly convened in January 2001 and served as a government supporter.

In July 2003, Radulović was appointed as a parliamentary delegate to Serbia's lustration commission, which was to review the responsibility of individuals in human rights violations starting from 23 March 1976, when the International Covenant on Civil and Political Rights came into effect. He was later chosen as president of the body, although his appointment ended when his parliamentary term expired. In standing down from the committee, he complained that its work had not begun and that it seemed likely the country's incoming government would abandon it entirely.

The GSS contested the 2003 Serbian parliamentary election on the electoral list of the Democratic Party (Demokratska stranka, DS), and Radulović was included in the 221st position. The list won thirty-seven mandates, and he was not included in the GSS's delegation afterwards. His term in the assembly ended in early 2004.

The GSS board in Niš subsequently became divided into rival camps. Radulović resigned from the presidency of the board in March 2003 and also stood down from his role as a party representative in the city's administration. He later withdrew from the party entirely and started an independent political movement called the "League for Niš."

Serbia introduced the direct election of mayors in the 2004 Serbian local elections. Radulović ran for mayor of Niš under the banner of the "League for Niš" and finished last in a field of nine candidates. He later rejoined the GSS after a change in its leadership and served on the party's presidency. The GSS contested the 2007 Serbian parliamentary election on the list of the Liberal Democratic Party (Liberalno demokratska partija, LDP); Radulović appeared in the 185th position and did not receive a new mandate after the list won fifteen seats. He appears to have withdrawn from political life after this time.

== Electoral record ==
=== Local (City of Niš) ===
2004 City of Niš local election Mayor of Niš - First and Second Round Results
Candidate	Party	Votes	%	Votes	%
Smiljko Kostić	Political Organization for Democratic Change "New Serbia"–Velimir Ilić	15,115	23.68	38,291	63.63
Goran Ćirić (incumbent)	Democratic Party–Boris Tadić	18,640	29.21	21,887	36.37
Dragoljub Stamenković	Serbian Radical Party–Tomislav Nikolić	8,220	12.88		
Branislav Jovanović	G17 Plus	6,774	10.61		
Goran Ilić	Democratic Party of Serbia–Vojislav Koštunica	5,356	8.39		
Zoran Bojanić	Strength of Serbia Movement–Bogoljub Karić	4,685	7.34		
Vlastimir Đokić	Socialist Party of Serbia–Tomislav Jovanović	3,692	5.78		
Ljubivoje Slavković	Citizens' Group: For Niš	see below			
Sima Radulović	Citizens' Group: League for Niš	see below			
Total valid votes		63,824	100	60,178	100
