= Mladen Đurić =

Serbian politician

Mladen Đurić (Serbian Cyrillic: Младен Ђурић) is a Serbian politician serving as the president of the Medijana Municipality since 30 July 2024. A close associate of Dragan Milić, he is one of the founders of Milić's citizens' group which participated in the 2024 local elections.

== Early life, education and private career ==
Đurić was born in Niš. He graduated from the College of Management and Business in Zaječar. By education, he is a manager. Since 2008, he is employed in JKP Medijana.

== Political career ==
Đurić started his political career as a member of G17 Plus of Mlađan Dinkić. After the dissolvement of G17 Plus, Đurić was active within the People's Movement of Serbia and later within the Niš My City political organization.

He served multiple terms in the Municipal Assembly of Medijana and the City Assembly of Niš.

Prior to the 2024 local election, Đurić was one of the founders of the Dr Dragan Milić Citizens's Group along with the prominent surgeon Dragan Milić. The group took part in the local elections in Niš and Medijana. The group placed first in the Medijana election and Đurić was elected president of the municipality on 30 June. Medijana is currently the only municipality in Serbia not under the control of the Serbian Progressive Party or its allies.
