= Branislav Jovanović (politician) =

Serbian politician

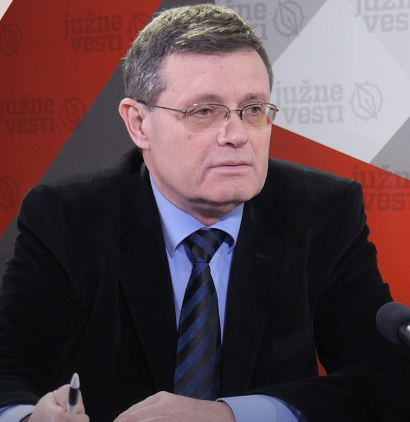
Branislav Jovanović in 2016

Branislav Jovanović (Serbian Cyrillic: Бранислав Јовановић; born 23 November 1955) is a politician in Serbia. He served in the National Assembly of Serbia from 2007 to 2013 as a member of G17 Plus and the United Regions of Serbia. He also served in the Yugoslavian Federal Assembly and held prominent municipal office in Niš.

== Early life and private career ==
Jovanović was born in Niš, in what was then the People's Republic of Serbia in the Federal People's Republic of Yugoslavia. He is a graduate of the University of Niš Faculty of Law and began working at the textile company NITEX in 1980. He served as general director of the company from 2000 to 2003, after having been selected for this role by its workers during the upheavals that took place after the fall of Slobodan Milošević's administration.

== Political career ==
=== During the Milošević administration ===
Jovanović led the local organization of the Serbian Renewal Movement (Srpski pokret obnove, SPO) in Niš during the 1990s and was a prominent opponent of Milošević.

The SPO participated in the 1996 local elections as part of the Zajedno (Together) coalition of opposition parties. When the first official returns showed that Zajedno had been defeated in Niš (as well as Belgrade and other major cities), several opposition figures charged electoral fraud and organized what became a series of major protests throughout the country. Jovanović was a leader of the protests in Niš and urged opposition supporters to remain peaceful, charging that the Milošević government was seeking a pretext for a crackdown. The Serbian government ultimately recognized the victories of Zajedno in Niš and elsewhere; as a result, Zoran Živković of the Democratic Party (Demokratska stranka, DS) became mayor of Niš while Jovanović became leader of its executive committee. In February 1997, he announced a comprehensive re-organization of the local administration, saying that local government agencies and companies would be headed by persons "who did not steal or conclude harmful contracts, but who are experts, responsible, ethical and replaceable."

Jovanović also contested the 1996 Yugoslavian parliamentary election (which took place concurrently with the local elections) as a Zajedno candidate and became part of the alliance's delegation to the Chamber of Citizens after it won two out of five seats in the Niš division. The Socialist Party of Serbia and its allies won this election, and the Zajedno members served in opposition. Jovanović appears to have resigned from the federal assembly once he received an executive position in the local government of Niš.

Jovanović served on Niš's electoral commission during the 1997 Serbian parliamentary election and expressed concerns about the transparency of the election to the Organization for Security and Co-operation in Europe (OSCE) monitoring mission.

In July 1999, in the aftermath of the North Atlantic Treaty Organization (NATO) bombing of Yugoslavia, Jovanović led the Niš municipal assembly in endorsing a motion demanding Slobodan Milošević's resignation as president of the Federal Republic of Yugoslavia. Jovanović described social and economic conditions in Niš as catastrophic during this time, saying, "Before the war, there were 40,000 unemployed and 30,000 on paid leave. Now we have another 10,000 unemployed."

While several local alliances between the DS and SPO fell apart soon after the 1996 elections (most notably in Belgrade), Živković and Jovanović generally kept their alliance against the Milošević administration intact until 2000. In June of that year, they led a sit-in demonstration in support of eleven opposition activists and journalists who had been detained at a demonstration.

The 2000 Yugoslavian general election was a watershed moment in Serbian political history, bringing about the fall of the Milošević administration and a victory for the Democratic Opposition of Serbia (DOS) alliance. The SPO did not, however, participate in this victory; it ran its own electoral list and won only a single federal seat. Jovanović again ran for a seat in the Chamber of Citizens and was defeated when the SPO failed to cross the electoral threshold in Niš. He also lost his constituency seat in the Niš assembly in the city elections.

=== After the fall of Milošević ===
Several prominent SPO members in Niš, including Jovanović, resigned from the party in October 2000 to start a new organization called the People's Party of Justice under the leadership of Borivoje Borović.

Zoran Živković resigned his city council seat in late 2000 to accept a cabinet position in the Yugoslavian government. A by-election was called to fill the position, and Jovanović was elected. In 2002, he joined the G17 Plus (G17+) party. He appeared in the seventy-sixth position on that party's list in the 2003 Serbian parliamentary election; the list won thirty-four seats, and he was not included in its assembly delegation. (From 2000 to 2011, Serbian parliamentary mandates were awarded to sponsoring parties or coalitions rather than to individual candidates, and it was common practice for mandates to be awarded out of numerical order. Jovanović could have been awarded a mandate despite his low position on the list – which was in any event mostly alphabetical – although in the event he was not.)

Jovanović was the G17+ candidate for mayor in the 2004 local elections and was defeated by Smiljko Kostić of New Serbia. He served as director of Niš's public construction agency from 2004 to 2010, at which time he became its executive director.

=== Member of the National Assembly ===
Jovanović received the eightieth position on the G17+ list in the 2007 parliamentary election. The list won nineteen seats and, on this occasion, Jovanović was included in its delegation. The party joined an unstable coalition government led by the DS and the rival Democratic Party of Serbia (Demokratska stranka Srbije, DSS), and Jovanović served as a supporter of the administration.

The DS–DSS coalition collapsed in 2008, and new elections were called. G17+ contested the election on the DS's For a European Serbia list; Jovanović, who received the seventy-seventh position, was chosen for a second mandate when the list won 102 seats. After extended negotiations, the For a European Serbia alliance formed a new coalition government with the Socialist Party of Serbia and Jovanović again served as a supporter of the ministry.

Serbia's electoral system was reformed in 2011, such that parliamentary mandates were awarded in numerical order to candidates on successful lists. For the 2012 Serbian parliamentary election, G17+ joined the United Regions of Serbia (URS) coalition. Jovanović received the thirteen position on its list and was re-elected to a third term when it won sixteen mandates. Following the election, the Serbian Progressive Party formed a new coalition with the Socialists and other parties, and the URS participated in the government. In April 2013, G17+ officially merged into the URS.

The URS withdrew from the coalition government in September 2013, and Jovanović resigned his seat in the same month to permit former cabinet minister Verica Kalanović to re-enter the assembly. He was promoted to the fifth position on the URS's list for the 2014 parliamentary election, but the list did not cross the threshold to win representation in the assembly.

The URS subsequently dissolved, and Jovanović became a founding member of a successor party called the People's Movement of Serbia, led by Miroslav Aleksić. This party contested the 2016 parliamentary election on the coalition list of the Social Democratic Party, the Liberal Democratic Party, and the League of Vojvodina Social Democrats. Aleksić received the eighth position and was elected when the list won thirteen mandates. Jovanović, who was awarded the thirty-sixth position, was not elected.

== Electoral record ==
=== Local (City of Niš) ===
2004 City of Niš local election Mayor of Niš - First and Second Round Results
Candidate	Party	Votes	%	Votes	%
Smiljko Kostić	Political Organization for Democratic Change "New Serbia"–Velimir Ilić	15,115	23.68	38,291	63.63
Goran Ćirić (incumbent)	Democratic Party–Boris Tadić	18,640	29.21	21,887	36.37
Dragoljub Stamenković	Serbian Radical Party–Tomislav Nikolić	8,220	12.88		
Branislav Jovanović	G17 Plus	6,774	10.61		
Goran Ilić	Democratic Party of Serbia–Vojislav Koštunica	5,356	8.39		
Zoran Bojanić	Strength of Serbia Movement–Bogoljub Karić	4,685	7.34		
Vlastimir Đokić	Socialist Party of Serbia–Tomislav Jovanović	3,692	5.78		
Ljubivoje Slavković	Citizens' Group: For Niš	see below			
Sima Radulović	Citizens' Group: League for Niš	see below			
Total valid votes		63,824	100	60,178	100
