= Vlastimir Jovanović =

Vlastimir Jovanović may refer to:

- Vlastimir Jovanović (footballer)
- Vlastimir Jovanović (politician)
