= Goran Ilić =

Serbian politician

Goran Ilić (Serbian Cyrillic: Горан Илић; born 19 August 1961) is an academic and politician in Serbia. He served in the National Assembly of Serbia from 2004 to 2006, was a deputy minister in Serbia's government from 2006 to 2008, and has held high-level office at the city level in Niš. Ilić is a member of the Democratic Party of Serbia (Demokratska stranka Srbije, DSS).

He is not to be confused with a public prosecutor in Serbia of the same name.

== Early life and academic career ==
Ilić was born in Niš, in what was then the People's Republic of Serbia in the Federal People's Republic of Yugoslavia. He graduated from the University of Niš Faculty of Medicine in 1986, passed a specialist exam in 1993, received his master's degree in 1994, and earned a Ph.D. in 1999. He is now a professor at the university as well as the director of its institute of forensic medicine. Ilić has published widely in his field.

== Politician ==
Ilić became politically active as a member of the DSS in 2001, and in February 2002 he was selected as one of the party's representative on the executive board in Niš's city government. He was recalled from this role in May 2003, when the DSS announced it would cease to participate in the work of the local administration; this occurred amid tensions between the party and the rival Democratic Party (Demokratska stranka, DS), which dominated the city's government at the time.

Ilić was given the fortieth position on the DSS's electoral list in the 2003 Serbian parliamentary election. The list won fifty-three seats, and he was subsequently awarded a mandate. (From 2000 to 2011, mandates in Serbian parliamentary elections were awarded to candidates on successful lists at the discretion of sponsoring parties or coalitions, irrespective of numerical order. Ilić was not automatically elected by virtue of his list position.) The DSS became the leading party in a coalition government after the election, and Ilić served as a supporter of the administration.

Serbia introduced the direct election of mayors in the 2004 local elections; Ilić was the DSS's candidate in Niš and finished in fifth place. He also led the DSS's list for the City Assembly of Niš in the concurrent assembly election and was elected when the list won eight mandates. There were difficulties in establishing a stable government in the city after the election, but the DSS eventually participated in a coalition with several other parties, and on 4 April 2005 Ilić was chosen as the president (i.e., speaker) of the city assembly.

Ilić resigned his parliamentary mandate on 27 March 2006 after being appointed as a deputy minister of health in Serbia's government. He was a DSS candidate in the 2007 Serbian parliamentary election, in which the party's list won forty-seven mandates. He did not take a seat in the assembly afterwards but was confirmed for another term as a deputy minister when the DSS formed a new coalition government with the DS and G17 Plus. In October 2007, he announced that Serbia would focus on a strategy of reducing the number of large hospitals for people with mental health issues and instead increase the number of local community centres providing support.

In March 2008, Ilić was advised that he could not continue to function as both a deputy minister and assembly president. He challenged the ruling, saying that no-one had previously indicated to him that a conflict of interest existed, although he indicated a willingness to resign as assembly president if so required.

The matter soon became moot. A new government was formed at the republic level by the DS, G17 Plus, and the Socialist Party of Serbia (Socijalistička partija Srbije, SPS) following the 2008 parliamentary election, and the same coalition came to power in Niš after the 2008 local elections, with the result that DSS was excluded from power at both levels. Ilić against ran as a DSS candidate in the parliamentary election but did not take a seat in the assembly afterwards; his term as deputy minister ended when the new administration was formed. His term as assembly president came to end in late July 2008. It is unclear from online sources if Ilić took a seat in the city assembly after the 2008 vote; if he did, he had resigned by the end of the year. He has not returned to electoral politics since this time.

Ilić remains active with the DSS and is a member of the party's executive board as of 2021.

== Electoral record ==
=== Local (City of Niš) ===
2004 City of Niš local election Mayor of Niš - First and Second Round Results
Candidate	Party	Votes	%	Votes	%
Smiljko Kostić	Political Organization for Democratic Change "New Serbia"–Velimir Ilić	15,115	23.68	38,291	63.63
Goran Ćirić (incumbent)	Democratic Party–Boris Tadić	18,640	29.21	21,887	36.37
Dragoljub Stamenković	Serbian Radical Party–Tomislav Nikolić	8,220	12.88		
Branislav Jovanović	G17 Plus	6,774	10.61		
Goran Ilić	Democratic Party of Serbia–Vojislav Koštunica	5,356	8.39		
Zoran Bojanić	Strength of Serbia Movement–Bogoljub Karić	4,685	7.34		
Vlastimir Đokić	Socialist Party of Serbia–Tomislav Jovanović	3,692	5.78		
Ljubivoje Slavković	Citizens' Group: For Niš	see below			
Sima Radulović	Citizens' Group: League for Niš	see below			
Total valid votes		63,824	100	60,178	100
