= Ćirković =

Ćirković is a Serbian surname. It may refer to:

- Sima Ćirković (1929–2009), Serbian historian and member of the Serbian Academy of Science and Arts . ...
- Milivoje Ćirković (born 1977), retired Serbian footballer
- Lazar Ćirković (born 1992), Serbian football defender
- Dragoslav Ćirković (born 1954), Serbian politician
- Miodrag Ćirković (born 1965), retired Serbian footballer
- Boško Ćirković, known as Škabo (born 1976), Serbian rapper
