= TV5 Skyscraper =

Building in Niš, Serbia

- TV5 soliter ТВ5 солитер
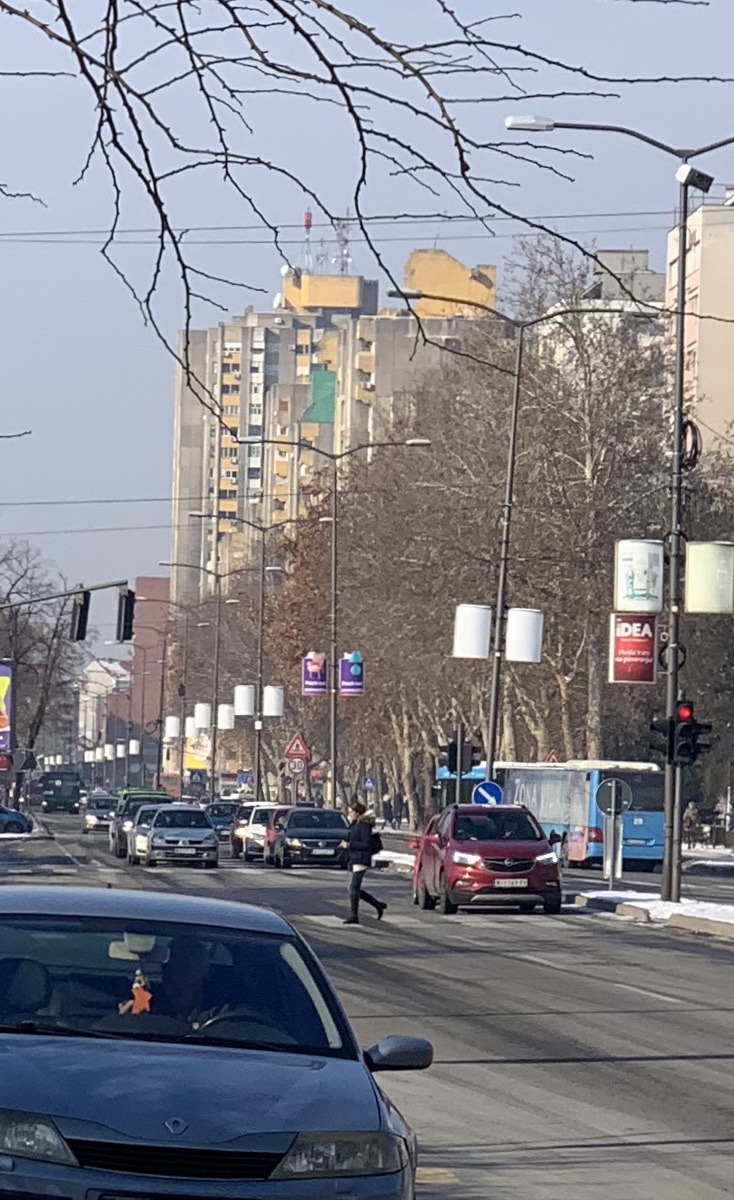
- Interactive map of the TV5 Skyscraper area
- Former names: Varteks Skyscraper

General information
- Status: Completed
- Type: Residential building
- Architectural style: Socialist modernism
- Location: Niš, Serbia, Zoran Đinđić boulevard
- Construction started: 1972
- Completed: 1973

Height
- Tip: 91 m

Technical details
- Material: Concrete
- Floor count: 25

Other information
- Parking: yes

TV5 Skyscraper is the tallest building in Niš, Serbia and the tallest building in Serbia outside Belgrade.

== History ==
TV5 Skyscraper is one of ten buildings built along the Boulevard of Doctor Zoran Djindjic, called 'Yellow Skyscrapers'. Their construction was financed by the Yugoslav People's Army.

Construction started in 1972 and the first 6 months of construction drained water from the land. During the next 6 months, this building was built. The migration started in December 1973. When completed, it became the second-tallest building in Serbia. The only higher building was the Ušće Tower. This building was dedicated to veterans from the Second World War. Shortly after the construction, Varteks store moved to the ground floor and the first three floors, and the building was named for the store, mainly because of the luminous advertising on the roof. Simpo from Vranje occupied another part of the building and Šipad opened.

A few years after that, NTV TV5 moved to the last four floors and set up its luminous advertising. Then this building got the nickname TV5, that is, Petica. The studio of this television was in this building until 2009, after which it was transferred to the Kalca shopping center in Niš.

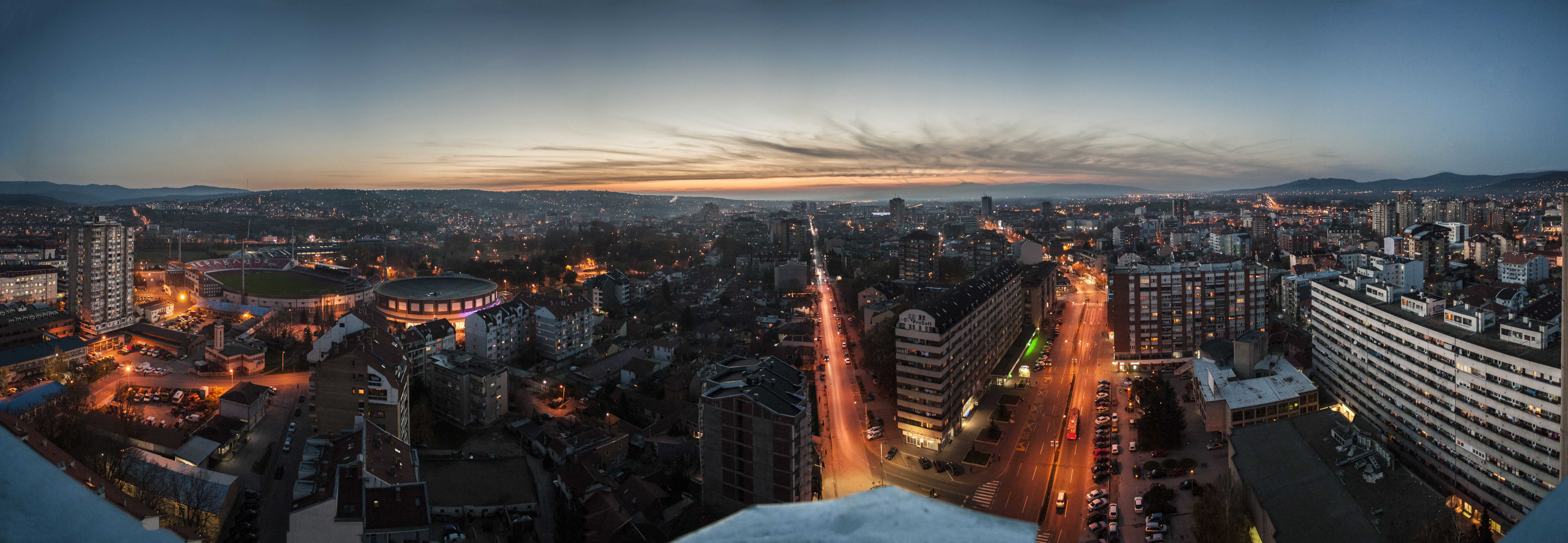
Panoramic view of Niš from TV5 Skyscraper
