= Smiljko Kostić =

Serbian politician

Smiljko Kostić (Serbian Cyrillic: Смиљко Костић; born 22 February 1945) is a retired politician and administrator in Serbia. From 1984 to 1998, he was the general manager of the tobacco firm Duvanska industrija Niš (DIN) in Niš. He served in the National Assembly of Serbia from 1991 to 1993 and was the mayor of mayor of Niš from 2004 to 2008. A member of the Socialist Party of Serbia (Socijalistička partija Srbije, SPS) for most of the 1990s, he later fell out of favour with Slobodan Milošević's administration, left the party, and was elected mayor in 2004 with an endorsement from New Serbia (Nova Srbija, NS).

== Early life and career ==
Kostić was born in Žitorađa in southern Serbia in the closing phases of World War II, shortly before the establishment of the People's Republic of Serbia within the Federal People's Republic of Yugoslavia. He was raised in the community and graduated from the University of Niš's Faculty of Mechanical Engineering. Kostić began working at DIN in 1971, initially as a warehouse employee and later as a workshop manager and chief engineer. In 1984, he was promoted to general manager. He resisted calls for the company's privatization in the 1990s.

== Politician and administrator ==
=== Parliamentarian and DIN general manager (1990–98) ===
Kostić was elected to the national assembly for Niš's third division in the 1990 Serbian parliamentary election. The SPS won a majority government, and Kostić served for the next two years as a government supporter. He was not a candidate in the 1992 parliamentary election.

In December 1991, Kostić announced that DIN had signed a forty-five million dollar contract with the Russian cigarette company Prodintorg, in which DIN agreed to modernize existing Russian facilities and construct new factories. During the sanctions against Yugoslavia in the 1990s, Kostić expanded the construction of new DIN plants in Serbia. In May 1994, he said that the smuggling of cigarettes into Serbia was a serious threat to domestic producers, and at the end of 1997 he complained that smuggling had effectively killed the industry.

=== Arrest and acquittal (1998–2003) ===
Kostić was arrested on 9 February 1998 on suspicion of having embezzled several million dinars. It was widely believed that the charges against him were politically motivated. Some rumours suggested that the arrest was prompted by a clash with Slobodan Milošević's son Marko and by his own links with business interests close to Montenegrin president Milo Đukanović; another rumour suggested that Kostić was removed from office to facilitate the privatization of DIN. Zoran Živković, at the time the mayor of Niš, said, "The arrest of Smiljko Kostić is a purely political act. He was unable to do anything without the knowledge of Slobodan Milošević." Following Kostić's arrest, pro-government media alleged that he had sold cigarettes in the country's illegal economy. In November 1999, a court in Niš convicted him of three charges and sentenced him to a total of six years in prison. In November 2000, after the fall of the Milošević regime, he was released pending an appeal.

The Supreme Court of Serbia acquitted Kostić of the main charges against him in 2003 while upholding the lesser charge of "unscrupulous work in the economy," which carried a two-year sentence. As he had already served this time, he was not required to return to prison.

=== Mayor of Niš (2004–08) ===
Serbia introduced the direct election of mayors for the 2004 local elections, and Kostić was elected mayor of Niš as the nominee of New Serbia (although, as a self-described leftist, he was not actually a member of the right-wing and monarchist party at the time). He defeated incumbent Democratic Party (Demokratska stranka, DS) mayor Goran Ćirić by a significant margin in the second round of voting; many commentators observed that his victory was due in large part to a local split in the DS ranks. New Serbia won only four out of sixty-one seats in the City Assembly of Niš, and Kostić did not initially have a working majority; in December 2004, his nominees for city council (i.e., the executive branch of the city government) were defeated by the assembly. The DS briefly formed an assembly majority with the Democratic Party of Serbia (Demokratska stranka Srbije, DSS) and G17 Plus, but this fell apart in early 2005. Eventually, Kostić and New Serbia were able to form a working majority with the DSS, G17 Plus, the SPS, and the Serbian Renewal Movement (Srpski pokret obnove, SPO).

In early 2005, Kostić organized a reception in support of Vladimir Lazarević, before the latter's departure for The Hague to face war crimes charges at the International Criminal Tribunal for the former Yugoslavia (ICTY). He later donated a car for use by a member of Lazarević's family. These actions prompted a diplomatic incident later in the year, when United Kingdom ambassador to Serbia and Montenegro David Gowan described the gift as an abuse of office, and both he and the American ambassador refused to meet with Kostić. New Serbia leader Velimir Ilić described the matter as a misunderstanding that had been blown out of proportion by media coverage.

In September 2005, Kostić announced that Russia's Gazprom was interested in financing a natural gas pipeline in southern Serbia and a new energy plant in Niš as part of a proposed deal between the two countries. He urged the Serbian government to approve the arrangement. The following year, he met with Skopje mayor Trifun Kostovski and Sofia mayor Boyko Borisov on increasing ties between the cities.

Kostić survived a recall election initiated by the DS in December 2005, with about sixty per cent of eligible voters opposing his removal from office. The following year, he made the unilateral decision of ending the city's financial support to the local daily Niške Narodne Novine, due to his dissatisfaction with its coverage of local politics and its decision to remove the city's coat of arms from its front page.

While Kostić was not a member of New Serbia at the time of his election as mayor, media reports indicate that he later joined the party. New Serbia contested the 2007 Serbian parliamentary election in an alliance with the DSS, and Kostić was given the 125th position out of 250 on their combined electoral list. The list won forty-seven seats, and he was not subsequently included in New Serbia's parliamentary delegation. (From 2000 to 2011, all parliamentary mandates were awarded to sponsoring parties or coalitions rather than to individual candidates, and it was common practice for the mandates to be distributed out of numerical order. Kostić's list position had no specific bearing on his chances of election.)

In June 2007, Kostić and New Serbia lost the support of their coalition partners in the Niš city assembly, which approved measures to significantly reduce the powers of the mayor's office. It was generally accepted during this time that Niš's political divisions had led to a form of administrative paralysis, which caused the city to fall behind economically.

Serbia abolished the direct election of mayors for the 2008 local elections; mayors were instead to be chosen by assembly members elected under proportional representation. New Serbia contested the election in an alliance with the DSS, which vetoed Kostić's inclusion on their list. Kostić announced his retirement from politics, and his term in office ended in July 2008.

== Since 2012 ==
Kostić visited and gave his support to two hunger strikers from the Serbian Progressive Party (Srpska napredna stranka, SNS) in Niš in April 2011. In October 2021, he expressed interest in building a tobacco factory in Leskovac.

== Electoral record ==
=== Local (City of Niš) ===
2005 Niš mayoral recall election
Option	Votes	%
Against the proposal to recall the mayor of Niš	not listed	62.52
For the proposal to recall the mayor of Niš	not listed	35.95

2004 City of Niš local election Mayor of Niš - First and Second Round Results
Candidate	Party	Votes	%	Votes	%
Smiljko Kostić	Political Organization for Democratic Change "New Serbia"–Velimir Ilić	15,115	23.68	38,291	63.63
Goran Ćirić (incumbent)	Democratic Party–Boris Tadić	18,640	29.21	21,887	36.37
Dragoljub Stamenković	Serbian Radical Party–Tomislav Nikolić	8,220	12.88		
Branislav Jovanović	G17 Plus	6,774	10.61		
Goran Ilić	Democratic Party of Serbia–Vojislav Koštunica	5,356	8.39		
Zoran Bojanić	Strength of Serbia Movement–Bogoljub Karić	4,685	7.34		
Vlastimir Đokić	Socialist Party of Serbia–Tomislav Jovanović	3,692	5.78		
Ljubivoje Slavković	Citizens' Group: For Niš	see below			
Sima Radulović	Citizens' Group: League for Niš	see below			
Total valid votes		63,824	100	60,178	100

=== National Assembly of Serbia ===
1990 Serbian parliamentary election Member for Niš III
Muharem Alijević	Social Democratic Party of Roma in Serbia	
Branislav Anđelković	Citizens' Group	
Milorad Brkić	Serbia Saint Sava Party	
Smiljko Kostić	Socialist Party of Serbia	Elected
Milija Krasojević	Serbian Renewal Movement	
Aca Matić	Citizens' Group	
Micko Mickovski	Party of Independent Businessmen and Peasants	
Miodrag Ćira Stanković	People's Radical Party	
Miroslav Šolević	New Democracy–Movement for Serbia	
Aleksandar Vidaković	Democratic Party	
