= Zoran Perišić =

Zoran Perišić may refer to:

- Zoran Perišić (politician)
- Zoran Perisic (visual effects artist)
