= Centar =

Centar may refer to:

- Centar Municipality (Skopje), a part of Skopje, North Macedonia
- Centar Municipality, Sarajevo, a part of Sarajevo, Bosnia and Herzegovina
- Centar, Niš, a neighbourhood of Niš, Serbia
- Centar (Croatian political party), a liberal party in Croatia
- Centar, Sisak, a section of Sisak, Croatia
- Centar, Varaždin, a section of Varaždin, Croatia

== See also ==
- Center (disambiguation)
