= Trg Kralja Aleksandra =

Trg Kralja Aleksandra Tpг Kpaљa Aлeкcaндpa
- Urban neighbourhood
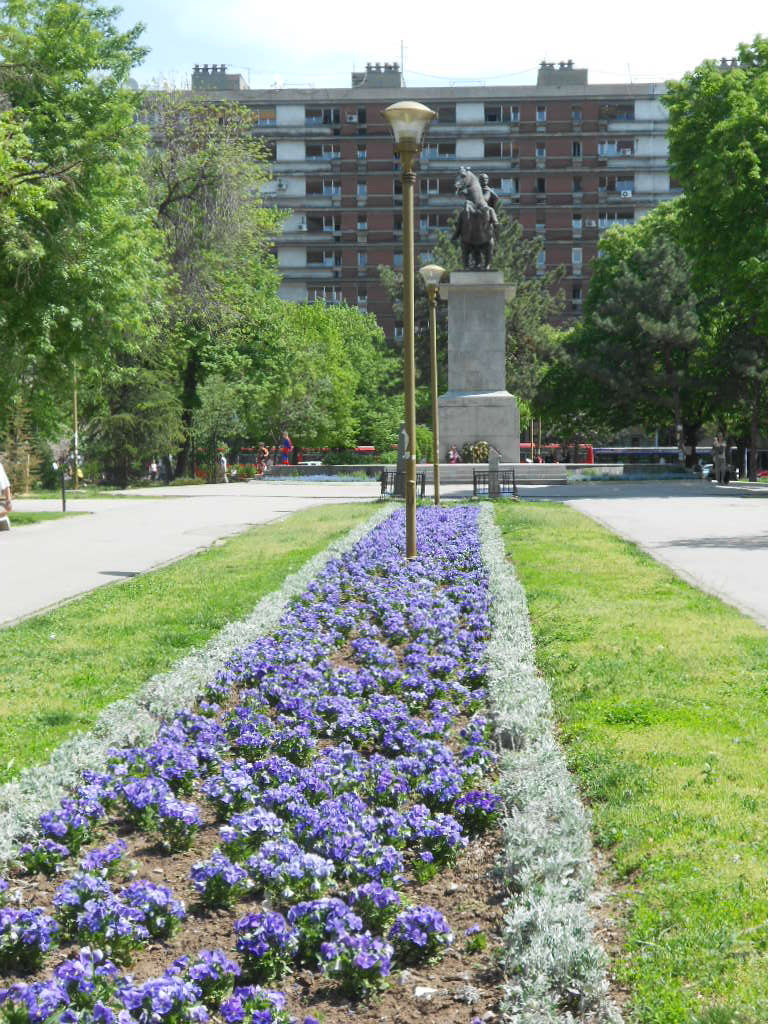
- Square of King Alexander I in 2013
- Country: Serbia
- City: Niš
- Municipality: Medijana

Trg Kralja Aleksandra (Serbian Cyrillic: Tpг Kpaљa Aлeкcaндpa, English: King Aleksander square) is a neighborhood of the city of Niš, Serbia. It is in Niš municipality of Medijana. It is named after King Alexander I of Yugoslavia.

== Location ==
Trg Kralja Aleksandra neighborhood is located in the central part of Niš around King Aleksander square. It is flat and bordered on the north by the Nišava river, on the east by the neighborhood of Centar, and on the west by the neighborhood of "Kičevo".

== History ==
During the Ottoman Empire, the King Aleksander square was called "Arnaut bazaar" (from Persian, بازار, bāzār), in Turkish "The Albanian marketplace." After the Serbian liberation of Nis 1878, the square was renamed to the square of the Mihailo Obrenović III, the ancestor of then the Prince, later the King of Serbia, Milan Obrenovic. The square was renamed 1939th when the monument of the King Alexander was constructed. After the World War II, the new communist government removed the monument 1946th and changed its name to the square of the JNA. 1992th the country changed its name, so the square of JNA became the Square of the Yugoslav Army (until 2003) and the square of the Army (until 2004). The monument of the King Alexander was constructed again in 2004, when the square got its final name.

== Characteristics and future development ==
The neighborhood is administrative, commercial and residential. The heart of the square is a green area with walking paths, benches, children's gaming devices, etc.. There are green spaces across the street, around the center, with large urban water fountain and a memorial bust. Outside the central green space, the square has the purpose of traffic roundabout with several bus stops for city bus routes. There is a plan of construction of new parking lot in the neighborhood.
