= Coat of arms of Niš =

Coat of Arms of Niš

Versions
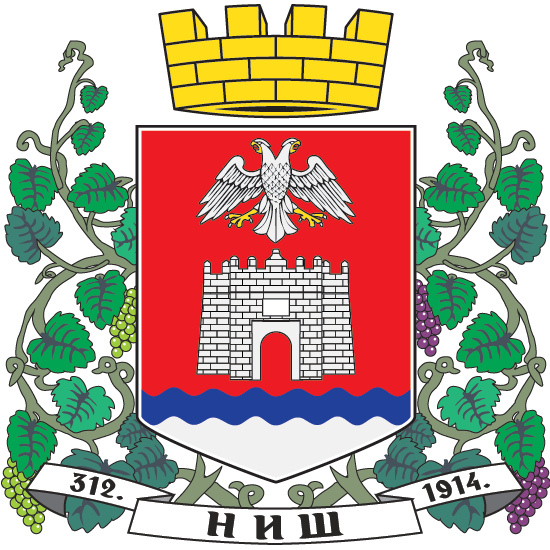
- Middle Coat of Arms

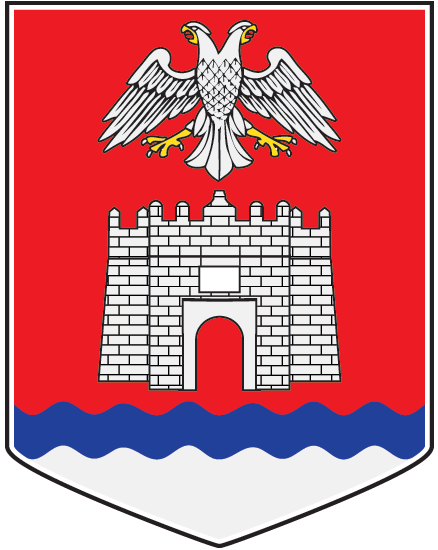
- Lesser Coat of Arms
- Armiger: City of Niš
- Adopted: 1996
- Crest: Stone crown
- Shield: Niš fortress, Nišava river and Serbian eagle
- Supporters: Stevan Sinđelić and Constantine the Great
- Compartment: Plains
- Motto: Name of the city in Serbian, Greek and Latin
- Use: The Institutions of the City of Niš

The Coat of Arms of Niš was designed by Dragomir Acović.

The Coat of Arms was adopted in 1996, but officially was adopted in 2000. It has three versions.

== Description ==
=== Larger Coat of Arms ===
The larger coat of arms has two supporters, Stevan Sinđelić (leader of first Serbian Uprising) and Constantine the Great (Roman emperor born in Niš) holding two flags, Serbian flag with cross and four stylised letters "S" (same flag is used by Serbian Orthodox Church) and purple flag with laurel wreath and two-headed eagle. Underneath them is compartment represented by plains and motto with name of the city in Serbian, Greek and Latin representing history of the city. In the middle there is an escutcheon painted in Serbian colors (red, blue and white). In the centre of the shield there is Niš Fortress, standing beyond Nišava river. Above the fortress there is Serbian eagle similar to those on the flag held by Constantine the Great. Crest is shown as a stone crown, and over it there is a Chi Rho with Greek letters alpha and omega on the sides.

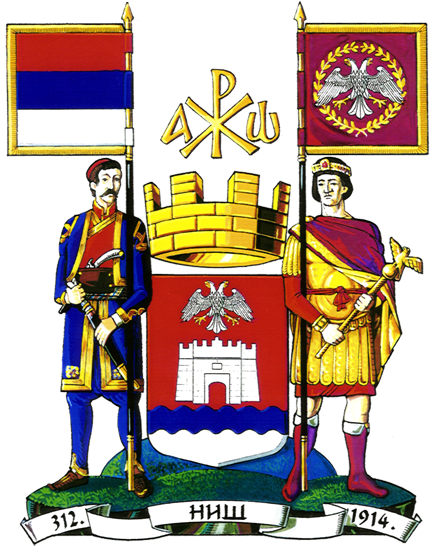
Often used wrong version of big coat of arms, with different Serbian flag and motto

=== Middle Coat of Arms ===
Middle coat of arms consists of a same shield, crest and motto as those of bigger coat of arms. Around shield there is a vine.

=== Small Coat of Arms ===
Small coat of arms is just shield with eagle, Niš Fortress and Nišava river in Serbian colors (red, blue, white).

== Coats of Arms of City municipalities ==
=== Niš municipality (until 2005) ===
Until 2005 Niš consisted of two municipalities, Niš and Niška Banja. Municipality of Niš had its own coat of arms and flag.

Coat of Arms of Niš municipality
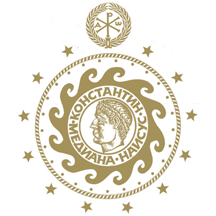
- Armiger: Municipality of Niš
- Adopted: 2002
- Relinquished: 2005

=== City municipalities (2005–) ===
Municipality	Coat of Arms	Versions	Year adopted
Medijana		N/A	2005
Palilula			2005
Crveni Krst		N/A	2005
Pantelej		N/A	2005
Niška Banja		N/A	1996
