= Bulevar Djindjića =

Serbian boulevard

Boulevard of Dr. Zoran Đinđić is the longest and oldest boulevard in the City of Niš, Serbia, with a length of 4 kilometers. There was a major reconstruction of the boulevard in 2011.

== Location ==
The boulevard begins at a location called Crveni pevac (Red rooster) and stretches to the beginning of the Boulevard of Saint Emperor Konstantin. The boulevard is part of a road that connected the City of Niš to a Romanian city called Drobeta-Turnu Severin. This road is called E-771 and is 225 kilometers long.

== Characteristics ==
The boulevard is 4 kilometers long and is the longest and oldest, but not the widest boulevard in the city. The boulevard at some parts has four lanes, at some parts five lanes and at some parts six lanes. It goes parallel to the Bulevar Nemanjića, which connects to this boulevard at the beginning of the Boulevard of Saint Emperor Konstantin. The boulevard does not have cycling lanes, but there exist plans for another reconstruction after which the boulevard will have a cycling lane.

== 2011 Reconstruction ==
In 2011, this street was part of a project called 'The boulevard ring'. During the reconstruction, some parts of the boulevard were widened and some were narrowed. The pavement was changed. Instead of a concrete, standard pavement, it was now built of smaller concrete pink and gray blocks. At the places where there are 4 lanes, the 2nd lane at both directions is a bit wider so there can be space for a vehicle to park. Most people consider this an auxiliary lane. If this is correct, the boulevard would actually have six lanes.
