= Centar, Niš =

Centar Центар
- Urban neighbourhood
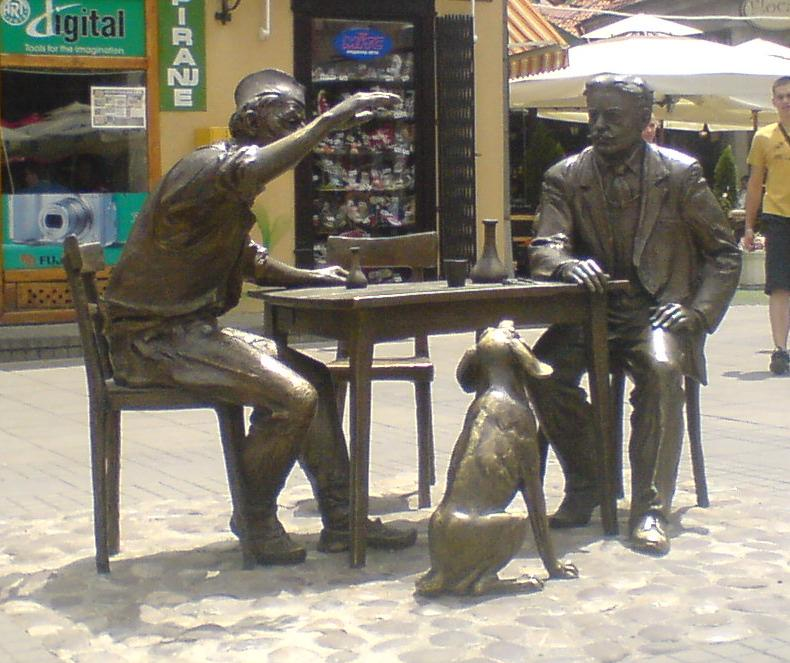
- Statue of Stevan Sremac, hunter Kalča and Kalča's dog Čapa in front of the Tinkers Alley
- Interactive map of Centar
- Country: Serbia
- City: Niš
- Municipality: Medijana

Centar (Serbian Cyrillic: Цeнтap) is a neighborhood of the city of Niš, Serbia. It is the part of the Niš municipality of Medijana.

== Location ==
Centar neighborhood, as the name indicate, is located in the city center. It is flat and bordered on the north by the Nišava river and on the south by the neighborhood of Marger.

== History ==
Centar neighborhood is one of the oldest neighborhoods in Niš.

== Characteristics ==
The neighborhood is administrative, commercial and residential.

== Tourist sites ==
- Tinkers Alley - An old urban downtown in today Kopitareva Street, built in the first half of 18th century. It was a street full of tinkers but today it's full of cafes and restaurants.
- Kalča, City passage and Gorča - Trade centers situated in Milana Obrenovića Street.
- Milana Obrenoviča Street (Pobedina) - Main pedestrian area and shopping zone of the city.
