= Dragoslav Ćirković =

Serbian politician

Dragoslav Ćirković Драгослав Ћирковић
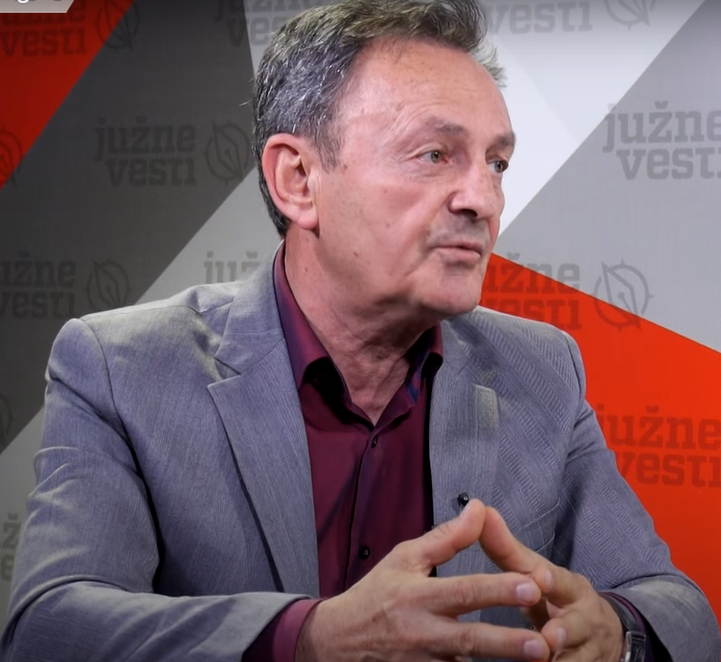
- Dragoslav Ćirković in a debate in а show "15 vs. 15" at Južne vesti, 19.04.2016.

President Municipality of Medijana

Personal details
- Born: 30 September 1954 (age 71) Blace, PR Serbia, Yugoslavia
- Party: Democratic Party
- Education: University of Niš
- Profession: Lawyer

Dragoslav Ćirković, Serbian Cyrillic: Драгослав Ћирковић; (born 30 September 1954) is a Serbian politician. He served as president of the municipality of Medijana, one of the Municipalities belonging to the City of Niš, from 2004 to 2012. Prior to being selected as president, Ćirković served as the director of the Medijana public corporation. He graduated from the Niš Law School.

He is highly popular in Niš due to his atypical approach to politics. On Friday 13 2010. he climbed Mont Blanc, he jumped out of airplane for a wager, he is one of the first politicians in Serbia to bequeath organs. He is often compared with Vladimir Putin, the current prime minister of Russia
