= Brzi Brod =

Brzi Brod Брзи Брод
- Village
- Location within Serbia
- Country: Serbia
- Region: Southern and Eastern Serbia
- District: Nišava
- Municipality: Medijana

Population (2011)
  - Total: 4,642
- Time zone: UTC+1 (CET)
  - Summer (DST): UTC+2 (CEST)
- Zip Code: 18116

Brzi Brod (Serbian Cyrillic: Брзи Брод) is a neighborhood situated in the Medijana municipality of the city of Niš, in Serbia. It is located 6 km (3.7 mi) east of the city center. According to the 2011 census, it has a population of 4642.
