= Tinkers Alley =

Street in Niš, Serbia

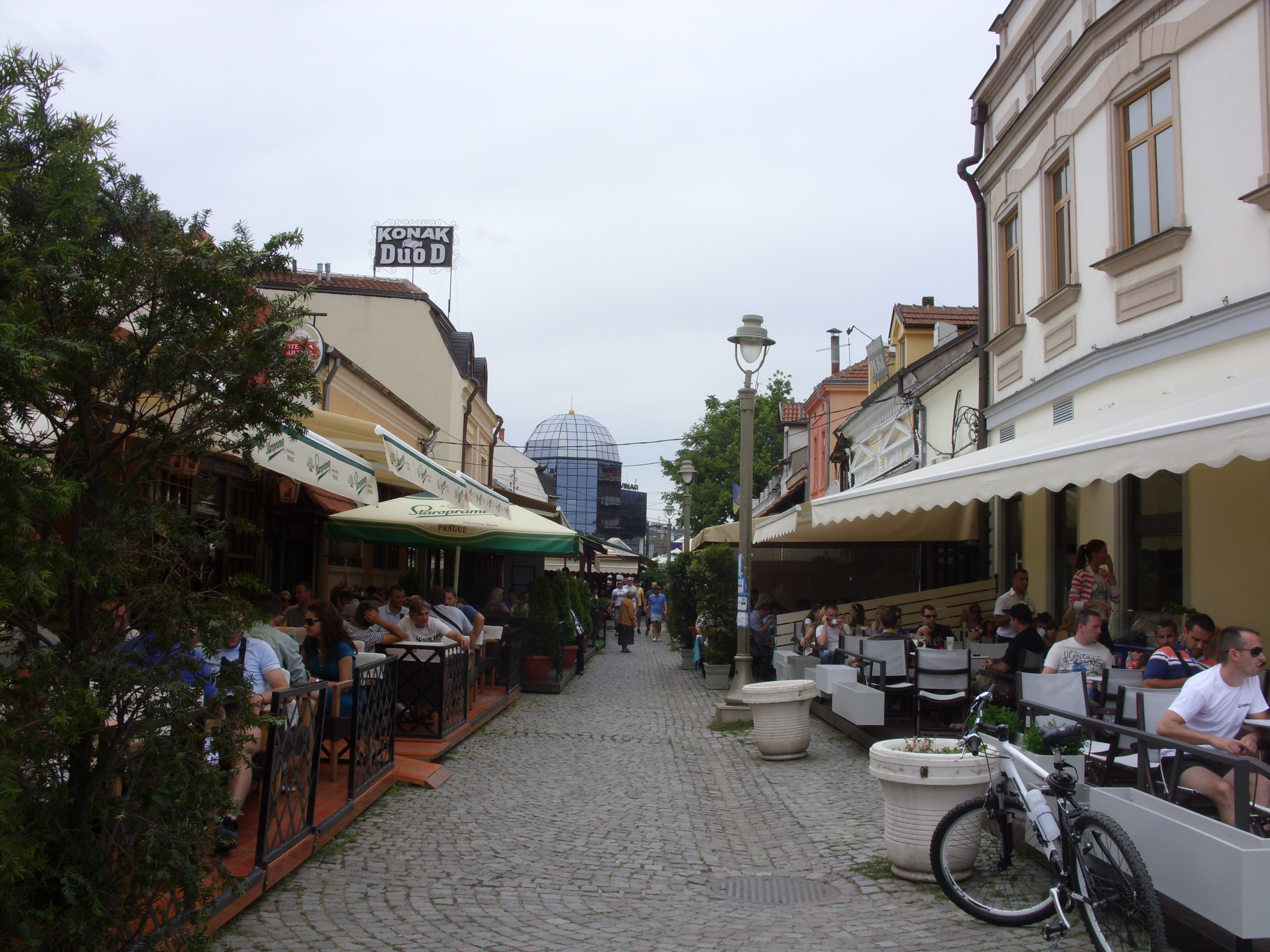
Tinkers Alley overview. Kalča shopping mall can be seen in background.

Tinkers Alley (Serbian: Kazandžijsko sokače, Казанџијско сокаче), also known as Coppersmith Alley, is an old urban downtown in Niš, Serbia, which was built in the first half of 18th century. It was a street full of tinkers and other crafts, together with craftsmen houses deriving from Turkish period.

Unfortunately, only one part from those houses was preserved today and protected as one structural building wholeness. The alley is protected by the state as a complex of great architectural value. Now the street has many cafés and restaurants.

== Location ==
Tinkers Alley is located in the City of Niš, Serbia and it is facing the Kalča, which is a 32,000 m^{2} (340,000 sq ft) shopping center.
