= Dragan Milić =

Serbian cardiac surgeon, university professor and politician

- Драган Милић
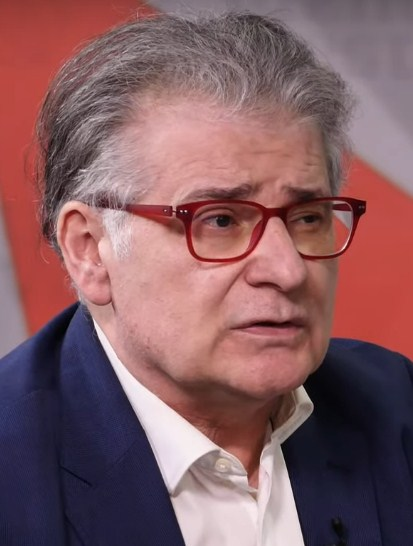
- Milić in 2024

Personal details
- Born: August 12, 1965 (age 61) Leskovac, SR Serbia, SFR Yugoslavia
- Party: Independent
- Education: University of Niš
- Occupation: Cardiac surgeon; university professor; politician

Dragan Milić (Serbian Cyrillic: Драган Милић; born August 12, 1965) is a Serbian cardiac surgeon, university professor and politician who is currently the director of the Clinic for Cardiac Surgery in Niš. He was elected to the City Assembly of Niš in the 2024 local elections after his citizens' group placed second with around 25% of the popular vote.

== Biography ==
Milić was born on August 12, 1965 in Leskovac, SR Serbia, SFR Yugoslavia. As a boy, he spent 3 years in England, from 1969 to 1972. He graduated from a gymnasium in Prokuplje. He graduated from the Faculty of Medicine at the University of Niš, where he also obtained his master's degree and a doctorate. He completed trainings in the United Kingdom and United States and specialized in general surgery, vascular surgery and cardiac surgery.

He has been employed at the Clinical Center of Niš since 1998. Since 2001, he has been working at the vascular surgery department of the Clinic for General Surgery as a general surgeon. After completing the sub-specialization in vascular surgery, he was assigned to the post of sub-specialist in vascular surgery at the Clinic for General Surgery. After the establishment of the Clinic for Vascular Surgery, he was appointed to the position of head of the phlebology department, and then to the position of assistant director of the Clinic for Vascular Surgery in 2008 and 2010. After the opening of the Clinic for Cardiovascular and Transplantation Surgery in November 2014, he was appointed as its first director, and after the restructuring of the Clinical Center of Niš and the establishment of the Clinic for Cardiac Surgery in July 2017, he was appointed as the first director of the Clinic.

Under his leadership, the clinic removed the waiting lists for surgeries.

He was appointed associate professor at the Faculty of Medicine in Niš in 2019, but was fired in May 2024.

=== Political career ===
Milić advocates for decentralization within Serbia. Milić is the president of the Serbian-Israeli Friendship Society since its establishment in 2021 and of the Serbian-American Club in Niš, which he founded in late 2014.

In March 2024, Milić founded a self-named citizens' group and later announced participation the 2024 local elections in Niš. His list placed second with around 25% of the popular vote, only behind the ruling Serbian Progressive Party (SNS). Milić proclaimed opposition victory and announced that the opposition will form a new local government. Neither bloc secured a majority, however: the SNS and the opposition lists each won 30 seats, one short, leaving the balance with the single councillor of the Russian Party, Tihomir Perić, who announced that he would enter a coalition with the Progressives. Opposition leaders from Niš accused SNS of electoral fraud and results manipulation. Later that year, he founded the Movement for the Decentralisation of Serbia (Serbian: Покрет за децентрализацију Србије, romanized: Pokret za decentralizaciju Srbije; abbr. PODES).

In August 2026, the leaders of the Ecological Uprising and New Face of Serbia said that Milić's citizens' group was in talks with their parties and with Miroslav Aleksić's People's Movement of Serbia about forming a joint opposition bloc ahead of the 2026 parliamentary election, although Milić's group did not comment publicly on the negotiations. On 10 September 2026 he announced that both his citizens' group and PODES would support the Student List at the election held on 25 October.
