= Bulevar Nemanjića =

Bulevar Nemanjića Булевар Heмaњићa
- Urban neighbourhood
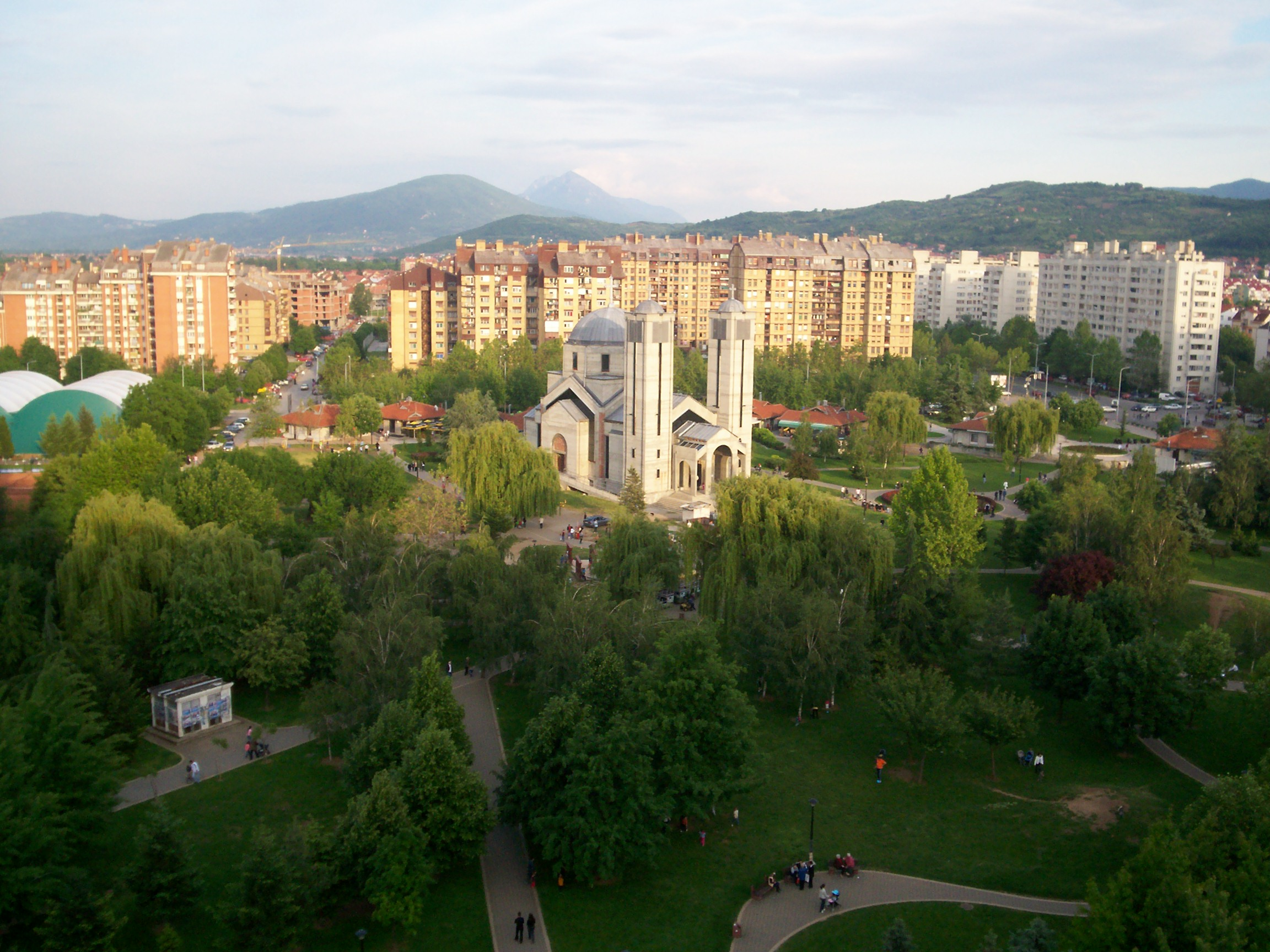
- Park of St. Sava, with the Church of Holy Emperor Constantine and Empress Helen
- Interactive map of Bulevar Nemanjića
- Country: Serbia
- City: Niš
- Municipality: Medijana

Bulevar Nemanjića (Serbian Cyrillic: Булевар Немањића, "Boulevard of the Nemanjić dynasty"), formerly Bulevar Lenjina ("Lenin Boulevard") and commonly known as Bulevar, is a street and urban neighbourhood of Niš, in southeastern Serbia. Bulevar is located in the center of Medijana municipality, bordered to the south by the boulevard (avenue) itself, to the north of the Nišava river and to the east by the neighborhood of Trošarina. Traditionally only the first row of apartment buildings south of Bulevar Nemanjića street was considered as part of the neighborhood, concretely the area of small individual family houses comprising unnamed area between Bulevar Nemanjića and other neighborhoods situated on Bulevar Zorana Đinđića.

== Characteristics ==
In recent times, the neighborhood is one of the major residential areas of the city. It is one of the newer neighborhoods, built mostly during the 1970s and 1980s. It consists almost exclusively of large apartment blocks. Due to this it is also one of the most densely populated areas of the city. The official seat of Medijana municipality is also situated in this neighborhood, as is the Roda shopping center.

The heart of the neighborhood is a relatively large park named after Saint Sava, known in English as the Park of St. Sava. In recent years this area has become one of night life spots in Niš due to a large number of cafes and restaurants. A new church in the center of the park serves as a local landmark.
