= Medijana =

Medijana Медијана
- City municipality
- City municipality of Medijana; Градска општина Медијана
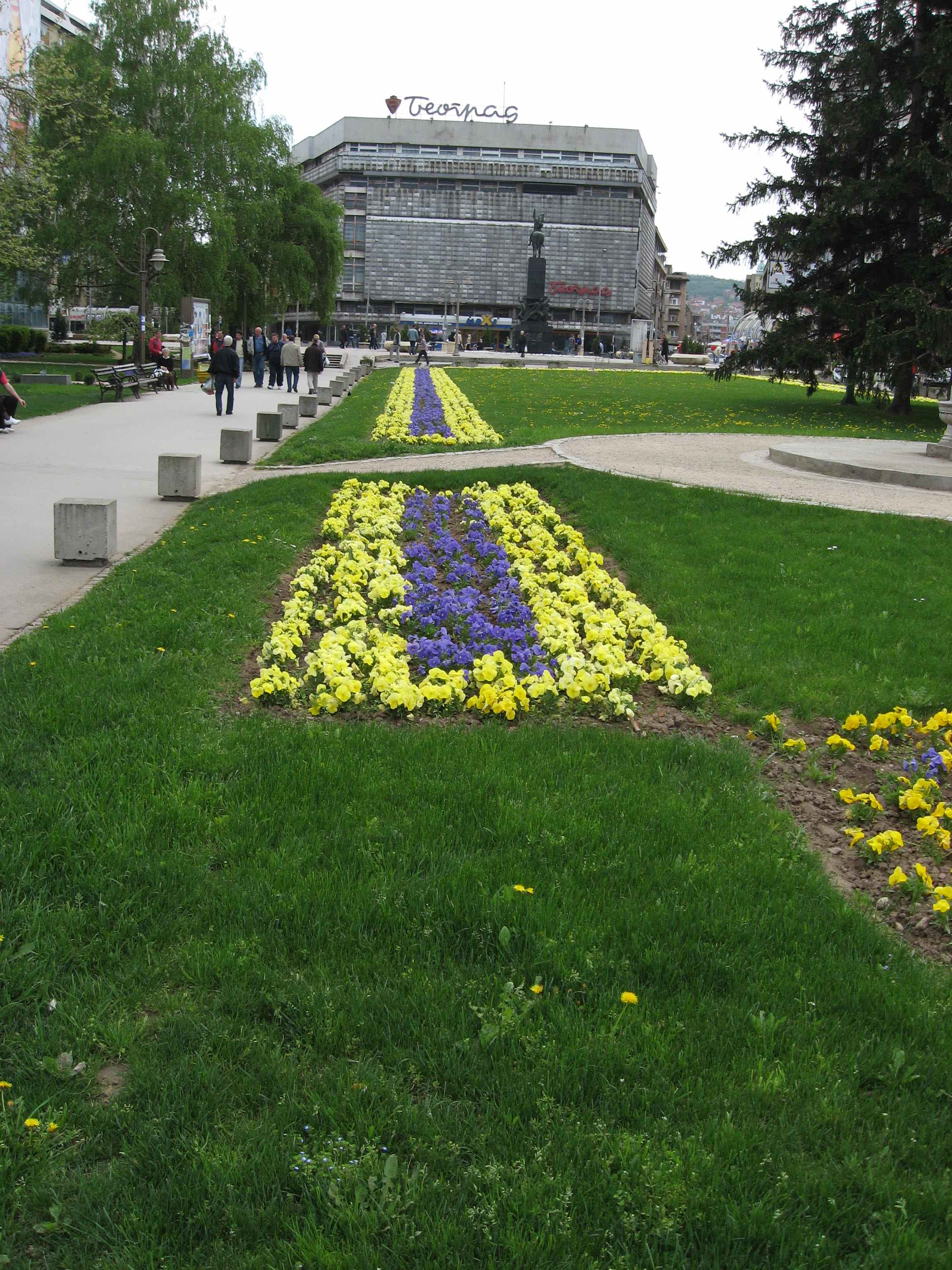
- Medijana

- Coat of arms

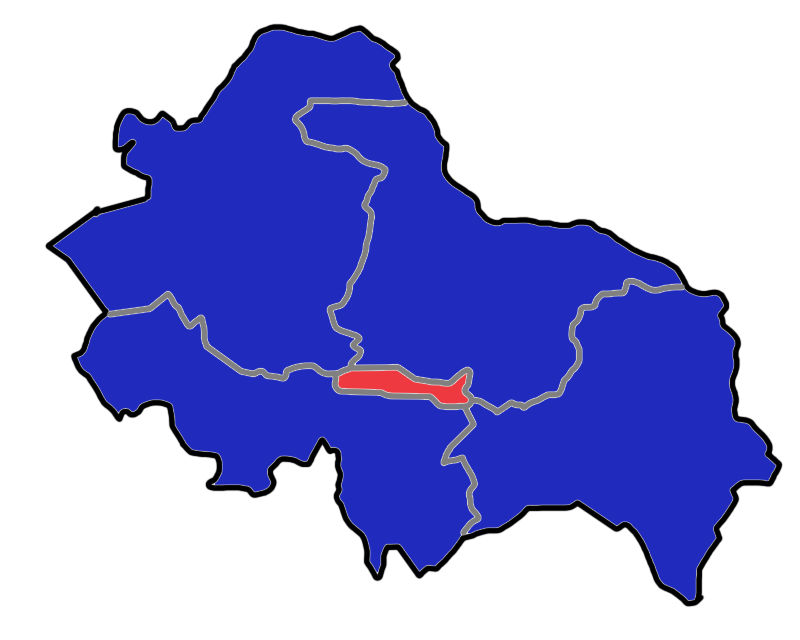
- Location of the municipality of Medijana City of Niš

- Location within Serbia
- Coordinates: 43°19′N 21°54′E
- Country: Serbia
- Region: Southern and Eastern Serbia
- District: Nišava
- City: Niš
- Settlements: 2

Government
  - Mayor: Mladen Đurić (Dr. Dragan Milić Citizens' Group)

Area
  - Municipality: 10.78 km^{2} (4.16 sq mi)

Population (2011 census)
  - Density: 5,500/km^{2} (14,000/sq mi)
  - Urban: 81,327
  - Municipality: 85,969
- Time zone: UTC+1 (CET)
  - Summer (DST): UTC+2 (CEST)
- Postal code: 18000
- Area code: +381(0)18
- Car plates: NI

Medijana (Serbian Cyrillic: Медијана) is one of five city municipalities which constitute the Serbian city of Niš. It is the central and the most populous city municipality of Niš with a population of 85,969 inhabitants.

== Geography ==
The municipality borders Pantelej municipality in the north, Niška Banja municipality in the east, Palilula municipality in the south, and Crveni Krst municipality in the west.

== Demographics ==
According to the 2011 census, the municipality had a population of 85,969 inhabitants, with 81,327 in the eponymous settlement.

=== Settlements ===
The municipality consists of two settlements: Brzi Brod (population 4,642), a rural settlement and Medijana (population 81,327), a part of a larger urban settlement of Niš.

=== Neighbourhoods ===
The neighbourhoods composing Medijana municipality are:

- Brzi Brod
- Bulevar Nemanjića
- Bulevar Djindjića
- Čair
- Centar
- Duvanište
- Kičevo
- Marger
- Medijana
- Trg Kralja Aleksandra
- Trošarina

== Politics ==
The current president of the municipality is Mladen Đurić of the Dr. Dragan Milić Citizens' Group. Medijana is currently the only municipality in Serbia not under the control of the Serbian Progressive Party or its allies.

== See also ==
- Subdivisions of Serbia
- Niš
