= University of Niš Faculty of Law =

- Правни факултет Универзитета у Нишу
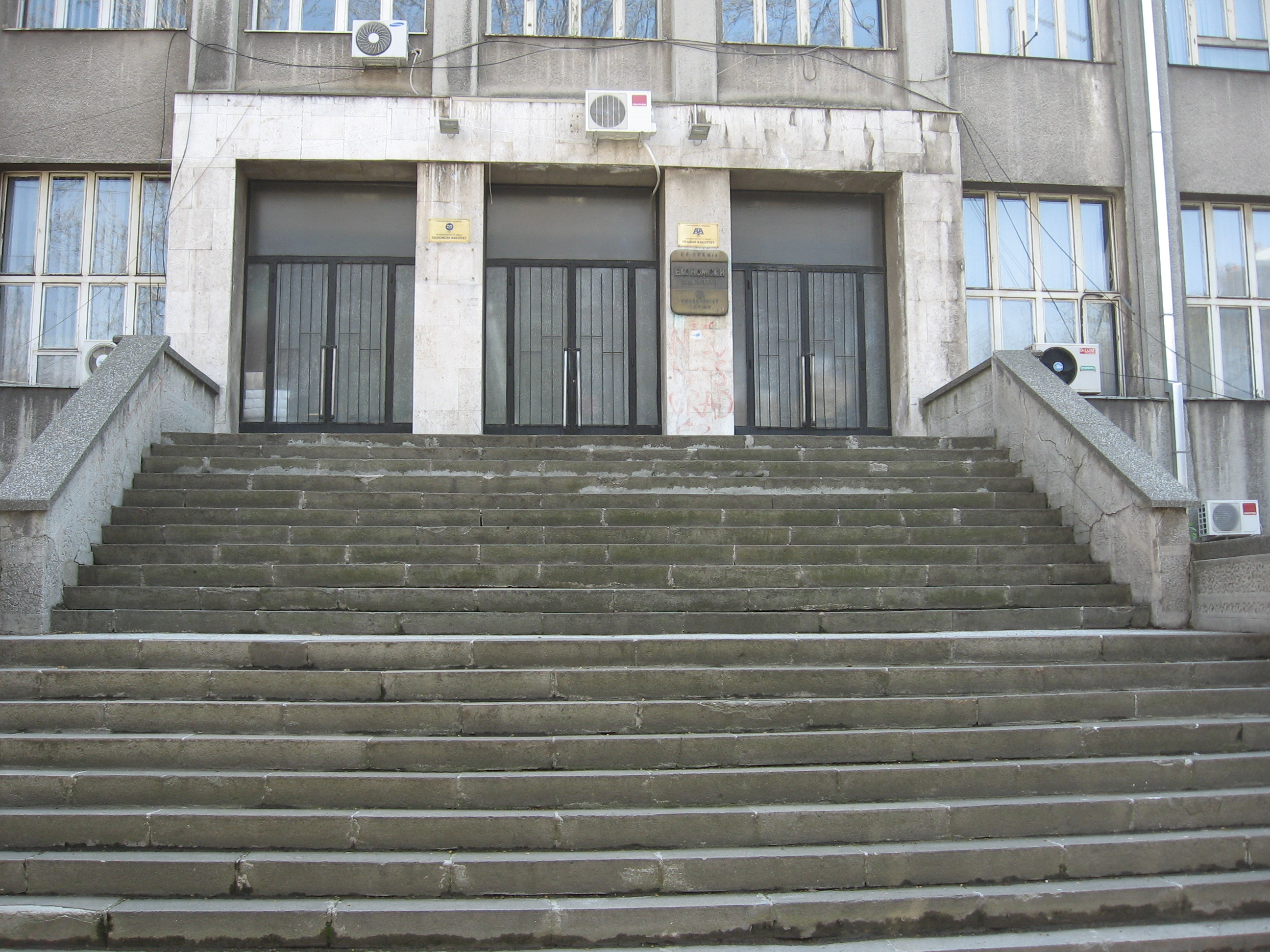
- Type: Public
- Established: 1960; 66 years ago
- Dean: Saša Knežević
- Academic staff: 49 (2018–19)
- Students: 1,708 (2018–19)
- Undergraduates: 1,504 (2018–19)
- Postgraduates: 204 (2018–19)
- Doctoral students: 0 (2018–19)
- Location: Niš, Serbia; 43°19′02.7″N 21°53′26.9″E
- Campus: Urban
- Website: www.prafak.ni.ac.rs

The University of Niš Faculty of Law (Serbian: Правни факултет Универзитета у Нишу, romanized: Pravni fakultet Univerziteta u Nišu), also known as the Niš Law School, is a leading school of the University of Niš, Serbia. The building is located on Trg Kralja Aleksandra, the main city square.

== History ==
The Niš Law School was established in 1960 as an outpost of the Belgrade Law School. The school gained independence from the University of Belgrade in October 1970 and started operating under the institutional framework of the University of Niš.

From 1960 to 1965 and 1978 to 1986 there was a two tier education program: a two-year undergraduate course of studies (aimed at obtaining the undergraduate degree) and a four-year undergraduate course of studies for obtaining an LLB degree. The Law School has been organizing post-graduate courses since 1970, including one-year Specialist's degree program and two-year master's degree program.

== Organization ==
The law school is divided into eight faculty organizational units (chairs):

- Chair of Jurisprudence;
- Chair of Public Law;
- Chair of Criminal Law;
- Chair of Civil Law;
- Chair of Trade Law;
- Chair of Law and Economics;
- Chair of Legal History;
- Chair of International Law.

== Publication center ==
The Publication Center was founded in 1998 to publish textbooks, monographs, collections of papers from scientific conferences and other publications for educational, professional and scientific purposes, both in printed and electronic form.

== Library ==
The Niš Law School Library houses over 28 thousand books and 509 periodicals. The collection is updated through purchase, exchange with other institutions, and donation of books, periodicals and sample copies. The Library premises include a spacious reading room with 120 seats and the library collection is accessible online.

== Degree programs ==
The school offers courses in public law, criminal law, civil law, trade law, international law, legal theory (jurisprudence), legal history, law and politics, law and sociology, and law and economy. Niš Law School is Ph.D.-granting institution. Since 2008, there are three study programs:

- 4-year Undergraduate Academic (LLB degree) Study Program (240 ECTS)
- 1-year Graduate Academic (LLM Degree) Study Program (60 ECTS)
- 3-year Post-graduate (LLD degree) Study Program (180 ECTS)
