= Goran Ćirić =

Serbian politician (born 1960)

- Горан Ћирић
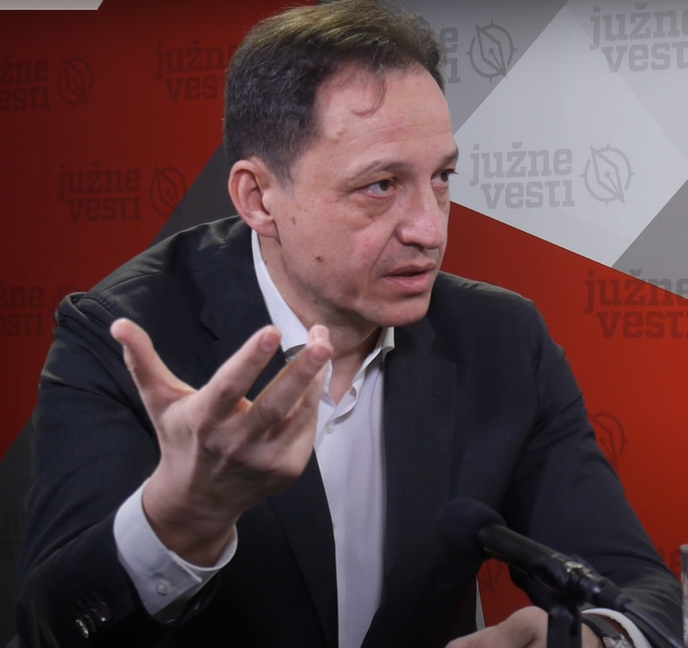
- Goran Ćirić in "15 minuta", made by Južne vesti in 18.03.2016

Mayor of Niš
- In office 10 November 2000 – 9 October 2004
- Preceded by: Zoran Živković
- Succeeded by: Smiljko Kostić

Member of the National Assembly of the Republic of Serbia
- In office 16 April 2014 – 3 August 2020
- In office 22 January 2001 – 27 January 2004

Personal details
- Born: 25 July 1960 (age 66) Niš, PR Serbia, FPR Yugoslavia
- Party: DS (1992–2020)
- Education: University of Niš

Goran Ćirić (Serbian Cyrillic: Горан Ћирић; born 25 July 1960) is a Serbian politician and administrator. He was the mayor of Niš from 2000 to 2004 and has served three terms in the Serbian parliament. Ćirić was a member of the Democratic Party (DS) during his time as an elected official, although he left the party in 2020.

== Early life and career ==
Ćirić was born in Niš, in what was then the People's Republic of Serbia in the Federal People's Republic of Yugoslavia. He graduated from the University of Niš Faculty of Electronics in 1984 and worked as a technical support engineer for the company El Honeywell from 1985 to 1991, implementing information technology projects throughout major firms in Yugoslavia. He ran his own company from 1991 to 1997, overseeing a team that designed integrated information systems.

== Politician ==
=== Early years (1992–2000) ===
Ćirić joined the Democratic Party in 1992 and became part of its main board in 1996. The party contested the 1996 Serbian local elections as part of Zajedno, a coalition of parties opposed to the governing Socialist Party of Serbia (SPS) led by Serbian president Slobodan Milošević. These elections, marked by controversy and protests, ultimately led to victories for Zajedno in several major Serbian cities, including Niš. Ćirić was elected to the Niš city assembly and served on its executive board for the term that followed; he was also president of the DS's city board for Niš in the same period. Zoran Živković, also a member of the Democratic Party, served as president of the assembly, a position that was at the time equivalent to mayor.

In late 1999, Ćirić helped to organize protests in Niš against Milošević's continued rule.

The Democratic Party became part of the Democratic Opposition of Serbia (DOS), a successor to the Zajedno coalition, in 2000. DOS candidate Vojislav Koštunica defeated Milošević in the 2000 Yugoslavian presidential election, which led to Milošević's fall from power and brought about widespread changes in the political culture of Serbia and Yugoslavia. The DOS also won landslide victories in several cities in the concurrent 2000 Serbian local elections; in Niš, the alliance won eighty-five out of ninety-five seats. Ćirić was re-elected to the assembly for the city's forty-eighth division and was appointed afterward as a vice-president of the executive board, overseeing the department of public services. Živković was appointed to another term as mayor.

=== Mayor of Niš and parliamentarian (2000–04) ===
Živković's second term as mayor of Niš proved to be brief; he was appointed to a ministerial position in the government of the Federal Republic of Yugoslavia in late 2000 and so resigned from the mayoral office. Ćiric was chosen as his successor on 10 November 2000. In December 2000, he hosted a meeting in Niš between Yugoslavian president Koštunica and Bulgarian president Petar Stoyanov.

The Serbian government fell after Milošević's defeat in the Yugoslavian election, and a new Serbian parliamentary election was held in December 2000. Prior to the vote, Serbia's electoral laws were reformed such that the entire country became a single electoral division and all mandates were assigned to candidates on successful electoral lists at the discretion of the sponsoring parties or coalitions, irrespective of numerical order. Ćirić appeared in the forty-fourth position on the DOS list and was awarded a mandate after the list won a landslide majority with 176 out of 250 seats. He took his seat when the new assembly convened in January 2001.

Between 2001 and 2002, Ćirić and his Bulgarian counterparts sought to construct a highway from Niš to Sofia with funding from the Stability Pact for South Eastern Europe. This project was indefinitely postponed in 2002 when the European Investment Bank withheld funding, stating that demand for the highway was insufficient and that the project would not quickly recoup its initial losses. This notwithstanding, Ćirić and the mayors of Sofia and Skopje, Republic of Macedonia, signed an agreement to form a euroregion centred around their communities in 2003.

Ćirić served two terms as chair of the Permanent Conference of the Cities and Municipalities in Yugoslavia during his time as mayor. In early 2002, he signed an accord with a representative of the National Association of Municipalities in Bulgaria for greater cooperation between the local governments of both countries.

Čirić resigned his seat in the national assembly on 12 June 2002, but his resignation was later overturned on technical grounds and his mandate restored. He continued to serve for the remainder of the parliamentary term.

In early 2003, Ćirić reached an agreement with Radio Television of Serbia for Radio Niš to be privatized after one year of transitional funding.

The DOS had dissolved by the time of the 2003 Serbian parliamentary election, and the DS contested the vote at the head of its own alliance. Ćirić received the sixty-fifth position its list and did not receive a new mandate when the list won thirty-seven seats. His term ended when the new assembly convened in early 2004.

In what proved to be a short-lived experiment, the Serbian government introduced the direct election of mayors in the 2004 Serbian local elections. Ćirić sought re-election in Niš but was defeated in the second round by Smiljko Kostić, who was endorsed by New Serbia (NS).

=== Administrator ===
The Serbian government appointed Ćirić as managing director of PTT Saobraćaja Srbija on 2 November 2007. In 2009, he announced that the organization would become a closed shareholding company in state ownership. He stood down as director in 2012, following a change in government that saw the Democratic Party move into opposition.

Ćirić was elected as a deputy chair of the Democratic Party in November 2012.

=== Return to parliament ===
Serbia's electoral system was reformed in 2011, such that all parliamentary mandates were awarded to candidates on successful lists in numerical order. Ćirić received the eleventh position on the Democratic Party's list in the 2014 Serbian parliamentary election and returned to the assembly after a ten-year absence when the list won nineteen mandates. The Serbian Progressive Party (SNS) and its allies won a majority government, and the DS continued to serve in opposition. In his second term, Ćirić was a member of the agriculture committee (Note: Formally known as the Agriculture, Forestry, and Water Management Committee.) and the spatial planning committee, (Note: Formally known as the Committee on Spatial Planning, Transport, Infrastructure, and Telecommunications.) a deputy member of the economy committee, (Note: Formally known as the Committee on the Economy, Regional Development, Trade, Tourism, and Energy.) the leader of Serbia's parliamentary friendship group with Japan, and a member of the friendship groups with Germany, Israel, Norway, Slovenia, and the United Kingdom.

He was promoted to the seventh position on the DS's list in the 2016 parliamentary election and was re-elected when the list won sixteen seats. The SNS and its allies won another majority government, and the DS again served in opposition. In October 2016, Ćirić replaced Bojan Pajtić as leader of the DS parliamentary group. During this term, he was also a member of the finance committee, (Note: Formally known as the Committee on Finance, State Budget, and Control of Public Spending) the administrative committee, (Note: Formally known as the Committee on Administrative, Budgetary, Mandate, and Immunity Issues.) and the spatial planning committee; again the leader of Serbia's friendship group with Japan; and a member of the friendship groups with Slovenia and the United Kingdom. The Democratic Party began boycotting the national assembly in early 2019, against the backdrop of significant public protests against Serbia's SNS-led government.

Ćirić had an extremely fraught relationship with Zoran Lutovac, who became leader of the DS in 2018. In May 2020, Ćirić said that he respected the party's decision to boycott the upcoming parliamentary election on the grounds that the SNS government was undermining the country's democratic institutions, but he also accused the leadership of inactivity during a time of crisis, saying that little was being done to build the party's organization and take its message to the broader public. He rejected the suggestion that he and fellow party dissidents were tacitly legitimating the SNS government by their actions.

The DS fulfilled its pledge to boycott the 2020 parliamentary election, and Ćirić's tenure in the assembly came to an end in that year. In September 2020, he was one of many high-profile figures to be expelled from the party. He has not sought a return to political life since this time.

== Honours ==
- Order of the Rising Sun, 3rd Class, Gold Rays with Neck Ribbon: 2021

== Electoral record ==
=== Local (City of Niš) ===
2004 City of Niš local election: Mayor of Niš
Candidate	Party	First round		Second round	
Candidate	Party	Votes	%	Votes	%
Smiljko Kostić	Political Organization for Democratic Change "New Serbia"–Velimir Ilić	15,115	23.68	38,291	63.63
Goran Ćirić (incumbent)	Democratic Party–Boris Tadić	18,640	29.21	21,887	36.37
Dragoljub Stamenković	Serbian Radical Party–Tomislav Nikolić	8,220	12.88		
Branislav Jovanović	G17 Plus	6,774	10.61		
Goran Ilić	Democratic Party of Serbia–Vojislav Koštunica	5,356	8.39		
Zoran Bojanić	Strength of Serbia Movement–Bogoljub Karić	4,685	7.34		
Vlastimir Đokić	Socialist Party of Serbia–Tomislav Jovanović	3,692	5.78		
two other candidates		1,342	2.10		
Total		63,824	100.00	60,178	100.00
Valid votes		63,824	97.04		
Invalid/blank votes		1,946	2.96		
Total votes		65,770	100.00		
Registered voters/turnout		220,595	29.81		

2000 Niš city election: Niš Division 48
Candidate	Party
Goran Ćirić (incumbent) (***WINNER***)	Democratic Opposition of Serbia (Affiliation: Democratic Party)
Mile Pešic	Serbian Radical Party
other candidates	
Total
