= Zoran Perišić (politician) =

Serbian politician

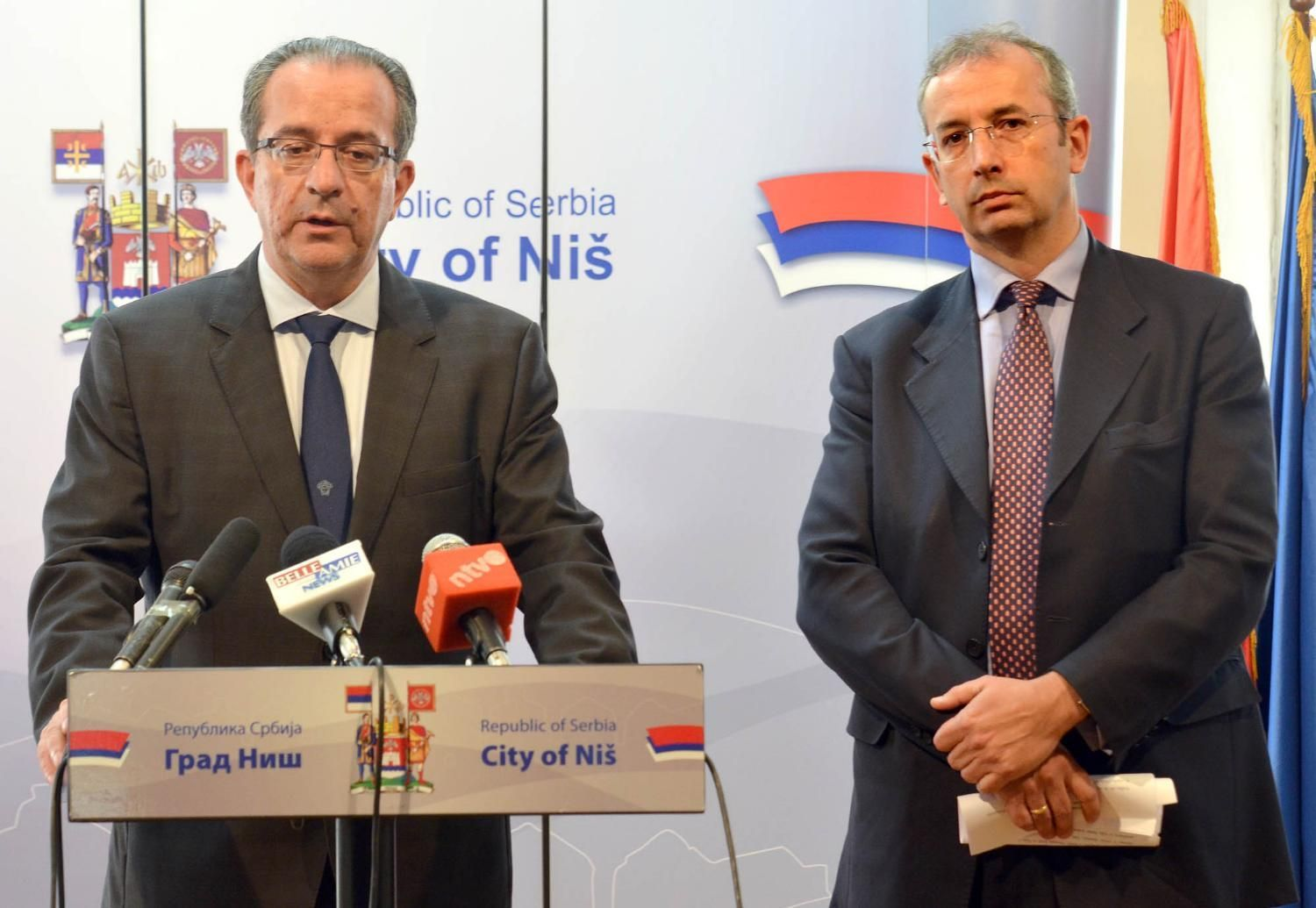
Zoran Perišić & Michael Davenport

Zoran Perišić (Serbia, Negotin, February 15, 1959) is a Serbian cardiologist, university professor and Niš City Mayor. He is a Member of Serbian Progressive Party Main Board and the President of the Niš City Board of Serbian Progressive Party.

== Biography ==
Zoran Perisic was born on February 15, 1959, in Negotin, Serbia. He completed his primary and secondary education in Niš. He graduated from the Medical Faculty in Niš in 1982. In 1989 he specialized in internal medicine at the Military Medical Academy. He is fluent in English. He is married and he has two children.

== Professional experience ==
- From 1985 to 1990 he was working at Niš City Military Hospital; he completed a fellowship in Internal Medicine at Belgrade Military Medical Academy in 1989.
- Since 1990 he has been working in Niš Clinical Center at the Cardiology Department.
- In 1992 he completed Master Studies in Endocrinology and in 1998 he completed his Doctoral Studies in Cardiology.
- In 2011 he sub – specialized in Cardiology.
- Since 2000 he has been teaching at Niš University Medical Faculty and in 2012 he was elected Associate Professor at Niš University Medical Faculty.
- As the Head of the Department for Invasive Diagnostics and Pacemakers he developed these disciplines and made them available to the citizens of whole region.
- He introduced, for the first time in the Balkans, several procedures from the field of interventional cardiology and pacemaker therapy as standard procedures.

== Politics ==
Since August 2011 he has been holding the position of the president of the Niš City Board of Serbian progressive Party. He is also a member of Serbian Progressive Party Main Board. In July 2012 he was elected Niš City Mayor. On December 11. 2013. Niš City Mayor Zoran Perišić was elected as a new president of Serbian Standing Conference of Towns and Municipalities at the 41st regular session of this National Association of Local Authorities in Serbia.

== Scientific Papers ==
He is author of two monographs, co-author of numerous text-books, author and co-author of 350 expert work papers. He is a consulting editor in two expert journals.
