= List of mayors of Niš =

Mayor of Niš
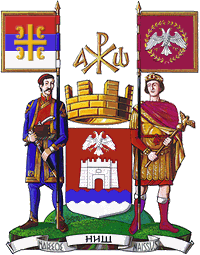
- Coat of arms of Niš
- Incumbent; Dragoslav Pavlović since 13 August 2024
- Style: Mayor
- Member of: City Council
- Reports to: City Assembly
- Residence: No official residence
- Seat: City Hall
- Term length: 4 years
- Inaugural holder: Dimitrije Kocić-Asardžijski
- Formation: 1878
- Deputy: Luka Gašević

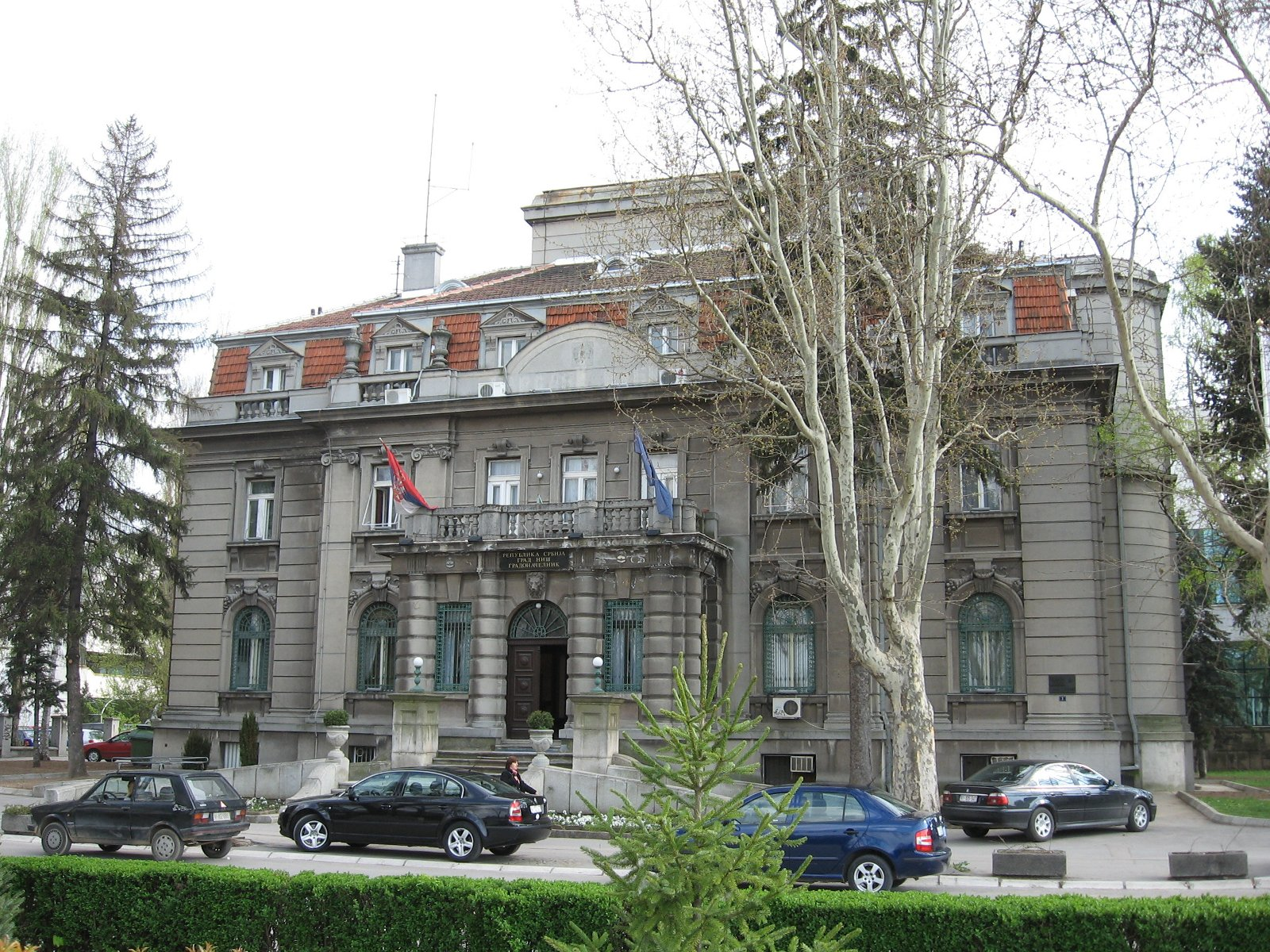
Office of the mayor. Built in 1925 according to the project of architect Aleksandar Janković.

This is a list of presidents of the Municipality of Niš, presidents of the City Assembly of Niš and mayors of Niš since 1878.

The mayor of Niš is the head of the City of Niš (the third largest city in Serbia). He acts on behalf of the City, and performs an executive function in the City of Niš. The current mayor of Niš is Dragoslav Pavlović (SNS).

== Principality of Serbia ==
- Dimitrije Kocić-Asardžijski (1878 – 1882)

== Kingdom of Serbia ==
- Dimitrije Kocić-Asardžijski (1882 – 1894)
- Đorđe Genčić (1894 – 1899) (Liberal Party)
- Todor Milovanović (1899 – 1910) (Liberal Party)
- Nikola Uzunović (1910 – 1918) (People's Radical Party) (Bulgarian occupation 1915 – 1918)

== Kingdom of Serbs, Croats and Slovenes / Kingdom of Yugoslavia ==
- Petar Stanković (1 December 1918 – 13 January 1919)
- Milan Joksimović (13 January 1919 – 5 January 1920) (acting President of the Municipality)
- Sotir Zdravković (5 January 1920 – August 1920) (acting President of the Municipality)
- Pavle Stojković (August 1920 – June 1920) (Communist Party of Yugoslavia) (elected President of the Municipality)
- Aleksandar Donković, Matija Kuzmanović and Nikola Marković (June 1920 – 25 September 1921) (provisional executive of the Municipality)
- Ljuba Aranđelović (25 September 1921 – August 1923) (elected President of the Municipality)
- Dragiša Cvetković (August 1923 – 7 November 1929) (elected President of the Municipality)
- Milorad Čavdarević (7 November 1929 – 15 February 1935) (appointed President of the Municipality)
- Dragiša Cvetković (15 February 1935 – 1936)
- Dragutin Petković (1936 – 1938)
- Dragutin Živković (1938 – 1941)

== Nedić's regime under Nazi German occupation ==
- Jovan Čemerikić (1941 – 1944)

== DF Yugoslavia / FPR Yugoslavia / SFR Yugoslavia ==
- Ivan Vučković (1958 – 1963) (League of Communists of Yugoslavia)
- Ratko Mitić (1963 – 1974) (League of Communists of Yugoslavia)
- Vladimir Petrović (1974 – 1979) (League of Communists of Yugoslavia)
- Milibor Jovanović (1979 – 1982) (League of Communists of Yugoslavia)
- Božidar Jocić (1982 – 1989) (League of Communists of Yugoslavia)
- Vojkan Mitić (1989 – 1990) (League of Communists of Yugoslavia)
- Života Živković (1990 – 1992) (League of Community of Yugoslavia/Socialist Party of Serbia)

== FR Yugoslavia / Serbia and Montenegro ==
Portrait	Name (Birth–Death)	Term of office		Party
	Stojan Ranđelović (1938–2018)	1992	December 1996	Socialist Party of Serbia
	Zoran Živković (born 1960)	26 January 1997	10 November 2000	Democratic Party
	Goran Ćirić (born 1960)	10 November 2000	9 October 2004	Democratic Party
	Smiljko Kostić (born 1945)	9 October 2004	5 June 2006	New Serbia

== Republic of Serbia ==
Portrait	Name (Birth–Death)	Term of office		Party
	Smiljko Kostić (born 1945)	5 June 2006	29 July 2008	New Serbia
	Miloš Simonović (born 1973)	29 July 2008	12 July 2012	Democratic Party
	Zoran Perišić (born 1959)	12 July 2012	11 July 2016	Serbian Progressive Party
	Darko Bulatović (born 1967)	11 July 2016	21 August 2020	Serbian Progressive Party
	Dragana Sotirovski (born 1973)	21 August 2020	12 August 2024	Serbian Progressive Party
	Dragoslav Pavlović (born 1979)	13 August 2024	Incumbent	Serbian Progressive Party

== Sources ==
- Web Page of the City of Niš
