= Kalča =

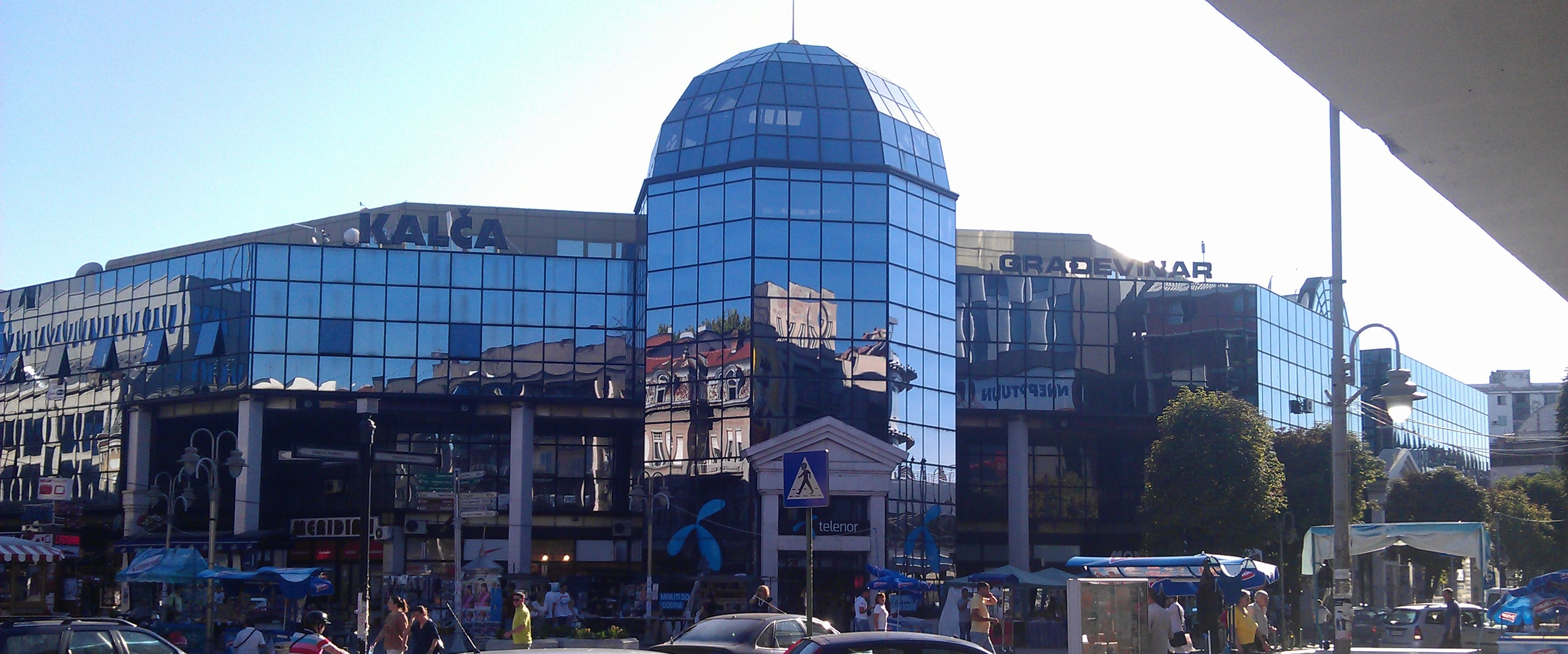
- Overview of TC Kalča
- Location: Niš, Serbia
- Opened: 1993
- Num. of stores: 450 - 500
- Floor area: 32,000 m^{2} (340,000 sq ft)
- Floors: 3

Kalča is a large shopping center in the City of Niš. It has been open since 1993, and is located in downtown Niš.

== Features ==
The shopping centre covers the area of over 32,000 m^{2} (340,000 sq ft) on the ground and two more floors. There are nearly five hundred shops, many galleries, in-doors squares, passages, drives and stairs, all of them forming a modern ensemble. The glass facade is supported by pillars.
