= Zoran Živković (politician) =

Prime Minister of Serbia (2003–2004)

- Зоран Живковић
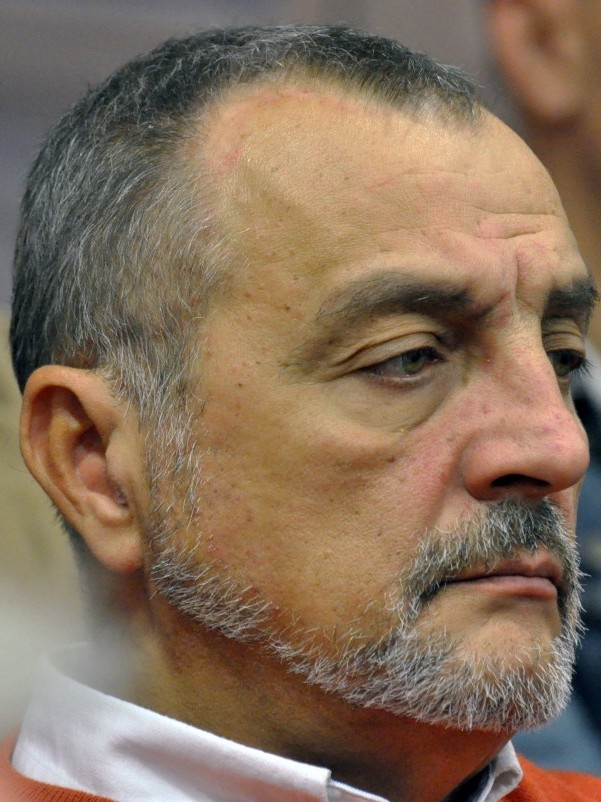
- Živković in 2018

Prime Minister of Serbia
- In office 18 March 2003 – 4 March 2004
- President: Nataša Mićić (acting); Dragan Maršićanin (acting)
- Preceded by: Nebojša Čović (acting)
- Succeeded by: Vojislav Koštunica

Minister of Internal Affairs of Yugoslavia
- In office 4 November 2000 – 17 March 2003
- Preceded by: Zoran Sokolović
- Succeeded by: Office abolished

2nd Mayor of Niš
- In office 26 January 1997 – 10 November 2000
- Preceded by: Mile Ilić
- Succeeded by: Goran Ćirić

Personal details
- Born: 22 December 1960 (age 65) Niš, PR Serbia, FPR Yugoslavia
- Party: DS (1992—2012); Nova (2013–2022)
- Spouse: Biserka Živković
- Children: Milena; Marko
- Website: Official Twitter

Zoran Živković (Note: Serbian Cyrillic: Зоран Живковић, pronounced [zɔ̌.ran ʒǐːʋ.kɔ.ʋitɕ]) (born 22 December 1960) is a Serbian politician who served as the prime minister of Serbia from 2003 to 2004 and as the mayor of Niš from 1997 to 2000.

He played a significant role during the protests and the overthrow of Slobodan Milošević. After the assassination of Zoran Đinđić, he headed the government of Serbia for a year. His reign was marked by a state of emergency period and the Operation Sabre, an action aimed at finding those responsible for political assassinations and combating organized crime. Živković later formed the liberal New Party and served as its president until his resignation in 2020. After that, he became executive director of the Center for development of civil society MilenijuM.

== Early life and education ==
Živković was born in Niš, Serbia, FPR Yugoslavia where he attended High School Bora Stanković, subsequently enrolling at the Belgrade Business School, where he received a Diploma in Economics and Social science. He worked as an entrepreneur before engaging in politics.

== Political career ==
=== Early years ===
Zoran Živković entered politics in 1992 by joining the Democratic Party (DS) and became a member of Serbian Parliament and the party's Deputy Leader under the leadership of Zoran Đinđić. In late 1996, Živković lead the civil protests of the opposition against the electoral fraud in Niš and became the first democratic Mayor of Niš in 1997.

=== 2000–2004 ===
In 2000, Živković contributed greatly to the mobilization of the democratic opposition of Serbia during October 5 overthrow of Milošević from power.

In November 2000, Živković became the Federal Minister of Interior of FR Yugoslavia and served until 2003, when the position was abolished following the constitutional formation of the State Union of Serbia and Montenegro.

After the assassination of Zoran Đinđić, Živković was elected as the 7th Prime Minister of Serbia and decisively lead his reformist Government through the state of emergency period and promoted offensive measures on cracking down organized crime and corruption, but his Government collapsed as a consequence of the controversial arrests, government scandals, and unrest within the coalition. After eleven months of heading the Government of Serbia, weakening public support saw Živković stepping down from the Democratic Party leadership position, following the loss of power in parliamentary elections held in December 2003 and successful challenge for party leadership by Boris Tadić, who emerged as the new leader. Živković was pushed to the sidelines within Democratic Party, as he never got on with the new party leadership under Boris Tadić.

=== 2004–present ===
Following a loss of power in 2004, Živković formed a non-governmental organization Milenijum - Center for Development of Civil Society, as a channel for his desire to "modify the consciousness of Serbian citizens related to the need of involving each individual into ongoing process of changes". During that period Živković was often linked in the media to another Democratic Party outcast Čedomir Jovanović who was vocally critical of the DS direction under the new leadership, but the two never really formed any kind of common political plan of action. Regarding his involvement with the Democratic Party, Živković claimed that he is "only a member" in spite of some views who saw his potential comeback to the party's Executive Board.

During this period, Živković was still present in public life, making occasional appearances on political talk shows, commenting on his past days with Zoran Đinđić and criticizing the lack of reformist agenda in the Government of Vojislav Koštunica.

Disappointed that the Democratic Party did not include him on their 250 candidates list for the 2007 parliamentary elections, he basically left active politics only to emerge to prior to the general elections in May 2012 actively opposing Boris Tadić's re-election as the President of Serbia and blaming him for the DS loss of power in May 2012.

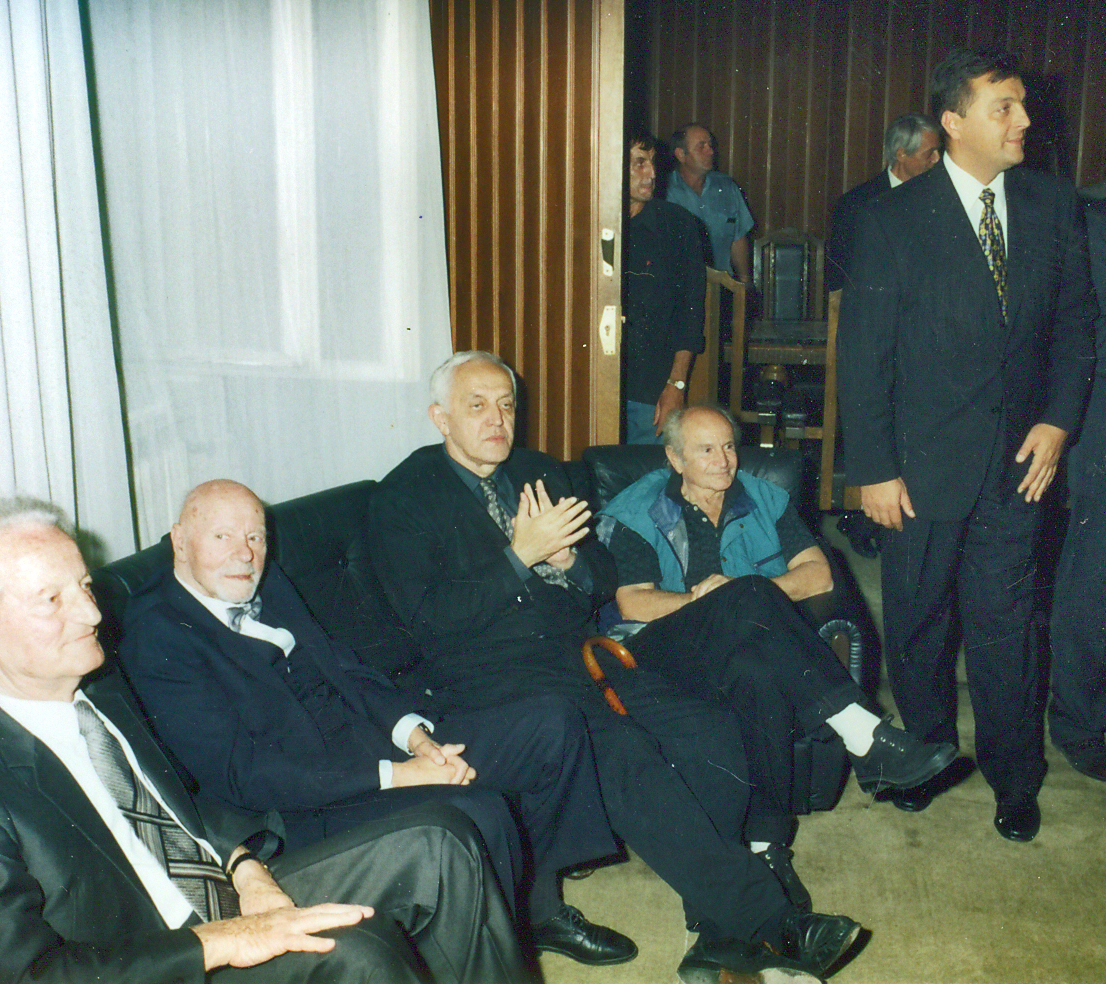
Živković during his term as mayor of Niš with Serbian actors Mića Tomić, Ljuba Tadić and Bata Paskaljević in 1997

In November 2012, he left Democratic Party after 20 years of membership, stating that he intends to form a new party in early 2013 which would continue the reform process, modernization of Serbia and the actions launched by DS, which were interrupted in early 2004.

== Personal life ==
Zoran Živković is married to Biserka, a lawyer and political activist. The couple live in Niš with their two children, Milena and Marko.

Živković was the owner of winery "House of wines Živković".

Political offices
Preceded by Zoran Đinđić	Prime Minister of Serbia; 2003–2004	Succeeded by Vojislav Koštunica
Party political offices
New office	President of the New Party; 2013–2020	Succeeded by Aris Movsesijan
