= City Assembly of Niš =

Legislature of Niš, Serbia

City Assembly of Niš Скупштина Града Ниша Skupština Grada Niša
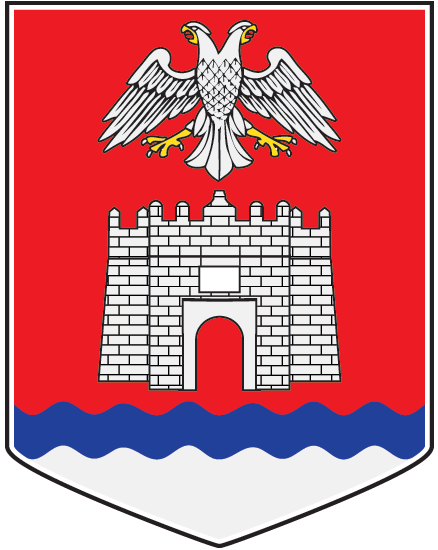
- Coat of arms of Niš

Type
- Type: Unicameral

Leadership
- President: Igor Novaković, SPS since 12 August 2024
- Deputy President: Vladica Maričić, SNS since 12 August 2024
- Secretary: Anđela Milojević since 12 August 2024

Structure
- Seats: 61
- Political groups: Government (31): SNS-led coalition (30); RS (1); Opposition (30): Dr Dragan Milić (16); We Choose Niš (NPS–ZLF–DS) (10); United for Niš (NDSS–KP) (4)
- Length of term: 4 years

Elections
- Voting system: Closed-list party-list proportional representation using the D'Hondt method with a 3% electoral threshold (not applied to ethnic minority lists); See Elections in Serbia
- Last election: 2 June 2024
- Next election: No later than 2028

Meeting place
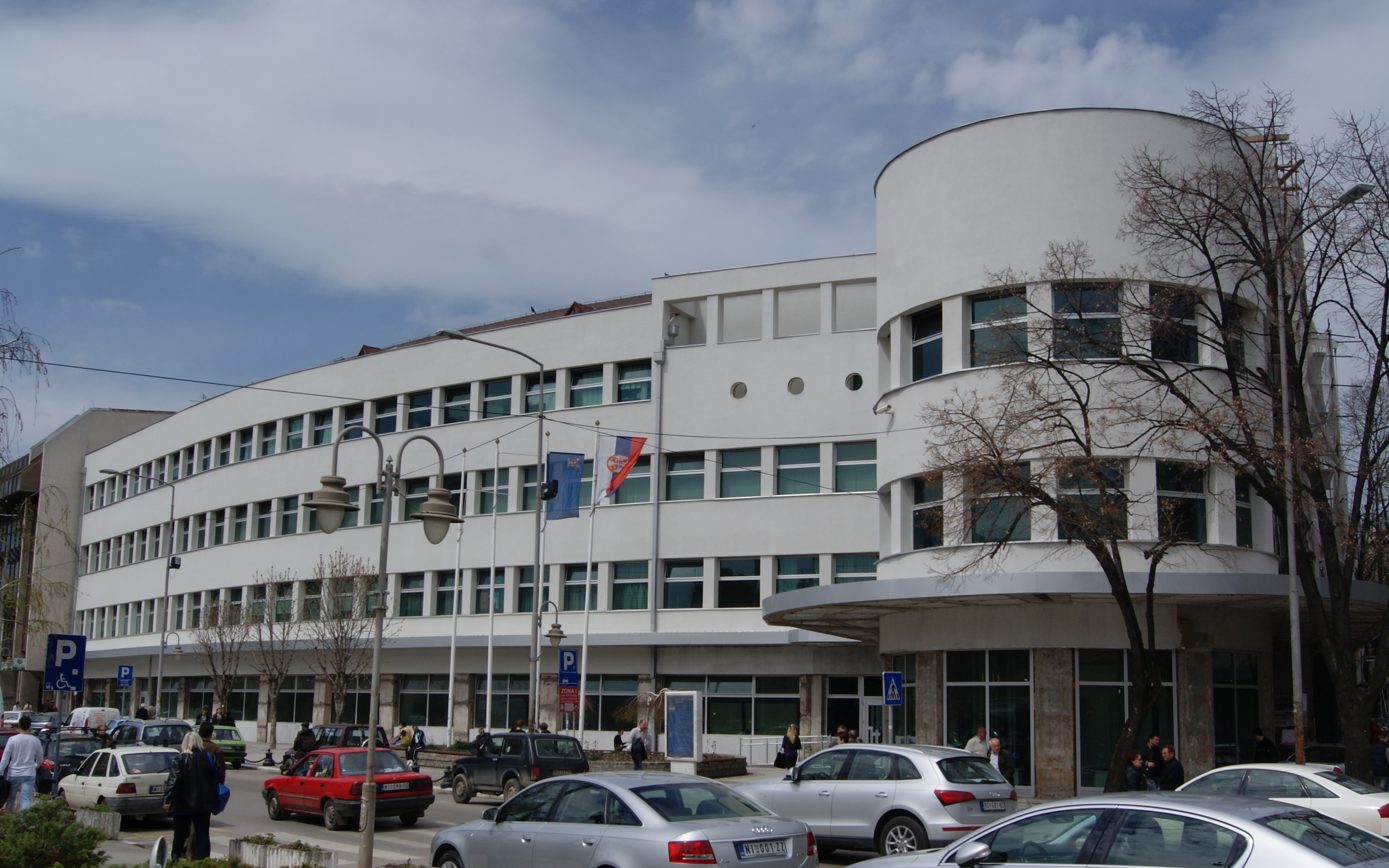
- City Hall, Niš

Website
- ni.rs

Constitution
- Statute of the City of Niš

The City Assembly of Niš (Serbian: Скупштина Града Ниша, romanized: Skupština Grada Niša) is the legislature of Niš, the third-largest city in Serbia. It is a representative body that performs the main functions of local government as set out by law and the Statute of the City of Niš.

== Composition ==
The City Assembly consists of 61 councillors elected in local elections for four-year terms. It meets as needed, and at least once every three months.

The current Assembly was elected in the local elections of 2 June 2024 and constituted at an 18-hour session on 12–13 August 2024. The session was marked by clashes between the opposition and the majority. The election of the Assembly president was disputed: a majority of the vote-counting commission, in which the opposition held a majority, initially declared the vote invalid for breaching ballot secrecy, before four commission members submitted a second report declaring Novaković elected with 31 votes. At the same session, Dragoslav Pavlović of the Serbian Progressive Party was elected mayor.

=== Councillor groups ===
Councillor groups in the City Assembly of Niš
Group	Chair	Seats
SNS-led coalition	Uroš Radulović	30
Dr Dragan Milić	Dragan Milić	16
We Choose Niš	Đorđe Stanković	10
United for Niš – NADA, Kreni-Promeni	Miodrag Stanković	4
Russian Party (not in a group)		1
Total		61

== Organisation ==
=== President and Deputy President ===
The President of the City Assembly organises its work, convenes sessions, proposes the agenda, presides over sittings, ensures the transparency of the Assembly's work, signs the acts it adopts and performs other duties entrusted by the Assembly. The Assembly elects the President and Deputy President from among the councillors for four-year terms.

=== Secretary ===
The Secretary of the City Assembly is responsible for the professional work related to convening and holding sessions of the Assembly and its working bodies, and manages the related administrative affairs. The Assembly appoints the Secretary and Deputy Secretary on the proposal of the President, for four-year terms.

Presiding officers of the City Assembly
Position	Name	Party
President	Igor Novaković	Socialist Party of Serbia
Deputy President	Vladica Maričić	Serbian Progressive Party
Secretary	Anđela Milojević	Not a councillor
Deputy Secretary	Milena Kostić	Not a councillor

== Powers ==
The City Assembly decides on:

- adopting and amending the Statute of the City;
- adopting the city budget and the annual financial statement;
- programmes for acquiring and disposing of real estate;
- the city's symbols, holidays and other features;
- street names;
- the city's public debt;
- calling referendums;
- cooperation and association with other local government units, including those in other countries;
- adopting the code of ethics for officials;
- electing and dismissing the President and Deputy President of the Assembly;
- electing and dismissing the Mayor and Deputy Mayor;
- electing and dismissing members of the City Council.

== See also ==
- Mayor of Niš
