= Palilula =

Palilula may refer to:

- Palilula (Belgrade), a municipality in the city of Belgrade, Serbia
  - Palilula (neighbourhood, Belgrade)
- Palilula (Niš), a municipality in the city of Niš, Serbia
  - Palilula (neighbourhood, Niš)
- Palilula (Svrljig), a village in the municipality of Svrljig, Serbia
- Palilula (Bulgaria), a village in Boychinovtsi Municipality, Montana Province, Bulgaria
- Palilula (Romania) (ro), a village in Bucovăţ Commune, Dolj County, Romania
