= Niš Constantine the Great Airport =

Serbia's second largest airport

Niš Constantine the Great Airport Аеродром Константин Велики Ниш
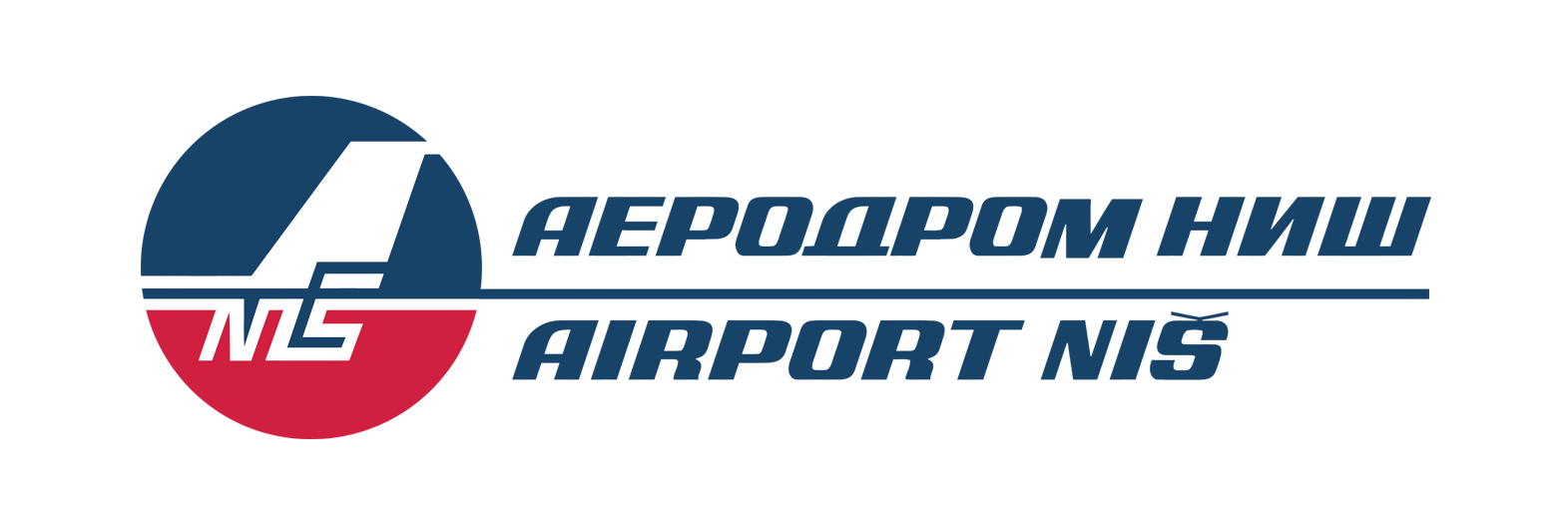

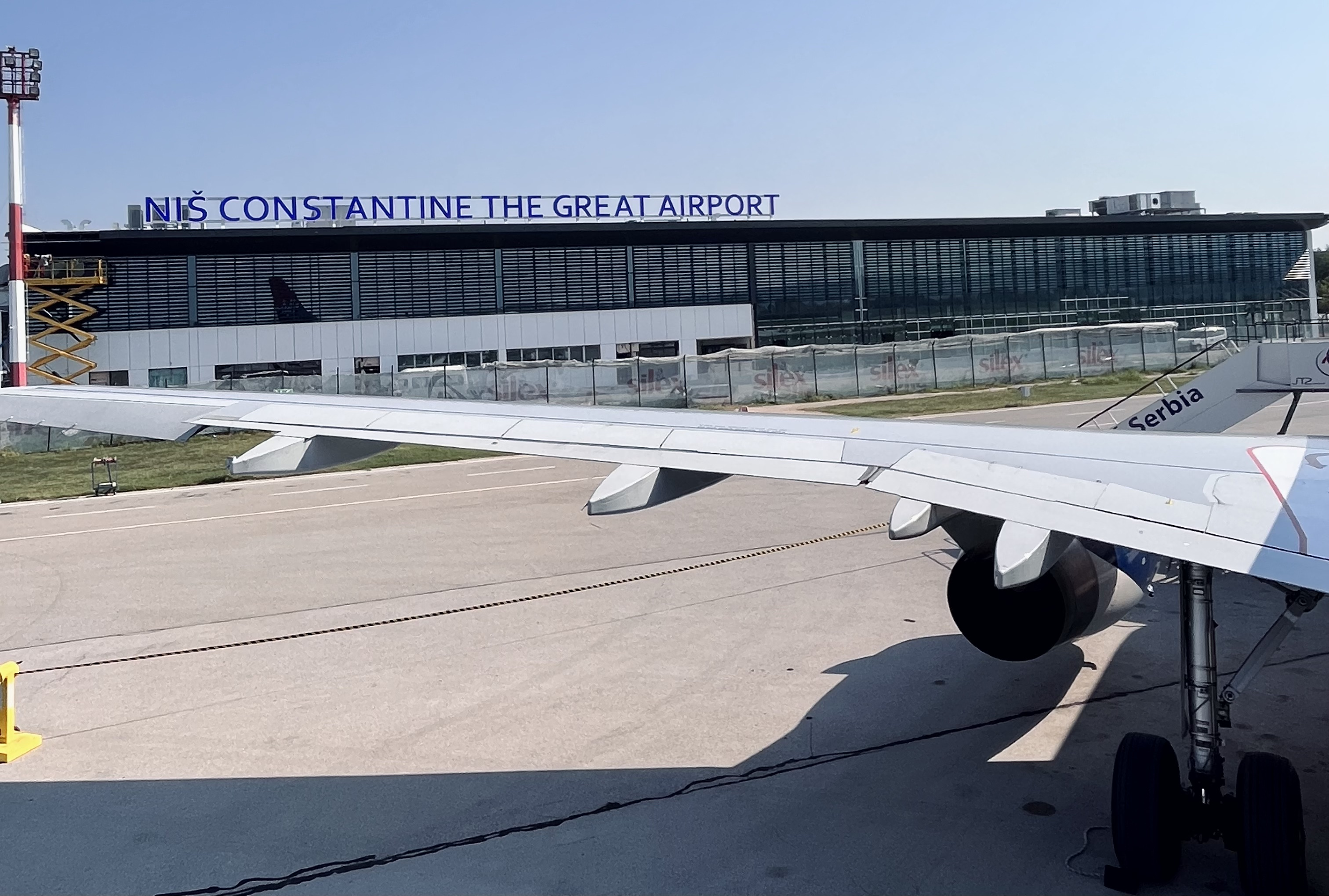
- IATA: INI; ICAO: LYNI

Summary
- Airport type: International/Military
- Owner: Government of Serbia
- Operator: Airports of Serbia
- Serves: Niš
- Location: Medoševac and Popovac, Serbia
- Focus city for: Air Serbia
- Elevation AMSL: 650 ft (200 m)
- Coordinates: 43°20′14″N 021°51′13″E
- Website: ini.aerodromisrbije.rs

Map
- Location in Serbia

Runways
Direction	Length		Surface
Direction	m	ft	Surface
11/29	2,500	8,202	Asphalt concrete

Statistics (2025)
- Passengers: ▲393,102
- Aircraft movements: ▲3,836
- Cargo volume: ▲424,579 kilograms (936,036 lb)
- Sources: Serbian AIP at Eurocontrol; Official website

Niš Constantine the Great Airport (Serbian: Аеродром Константин Велики Ниш / Aerodrom Konstantin Veliki Niš), or Niš Airport (Serbian: Аеродром Ниш / Aerodrom Niš) (IATA: INI, ICAO: LYNI), located 4 km (2.5 mi) northwest of downtown Niš, in the suburbs of Medoševac and Popovac. It is the second-largest and second-busiest airport in Serbia, after Belgrade Nikola Tesla Airport. Niš Air Base (Serbian Air Force and Air Defence), the Serbian-Russian Emergency Response Center, and the Center for Aerial Firefighting Duties, are all located on the site of the airport.

It is named after the Roman emperor, who was born in Naissus (now Niš), Constantine the Great.

== History ==
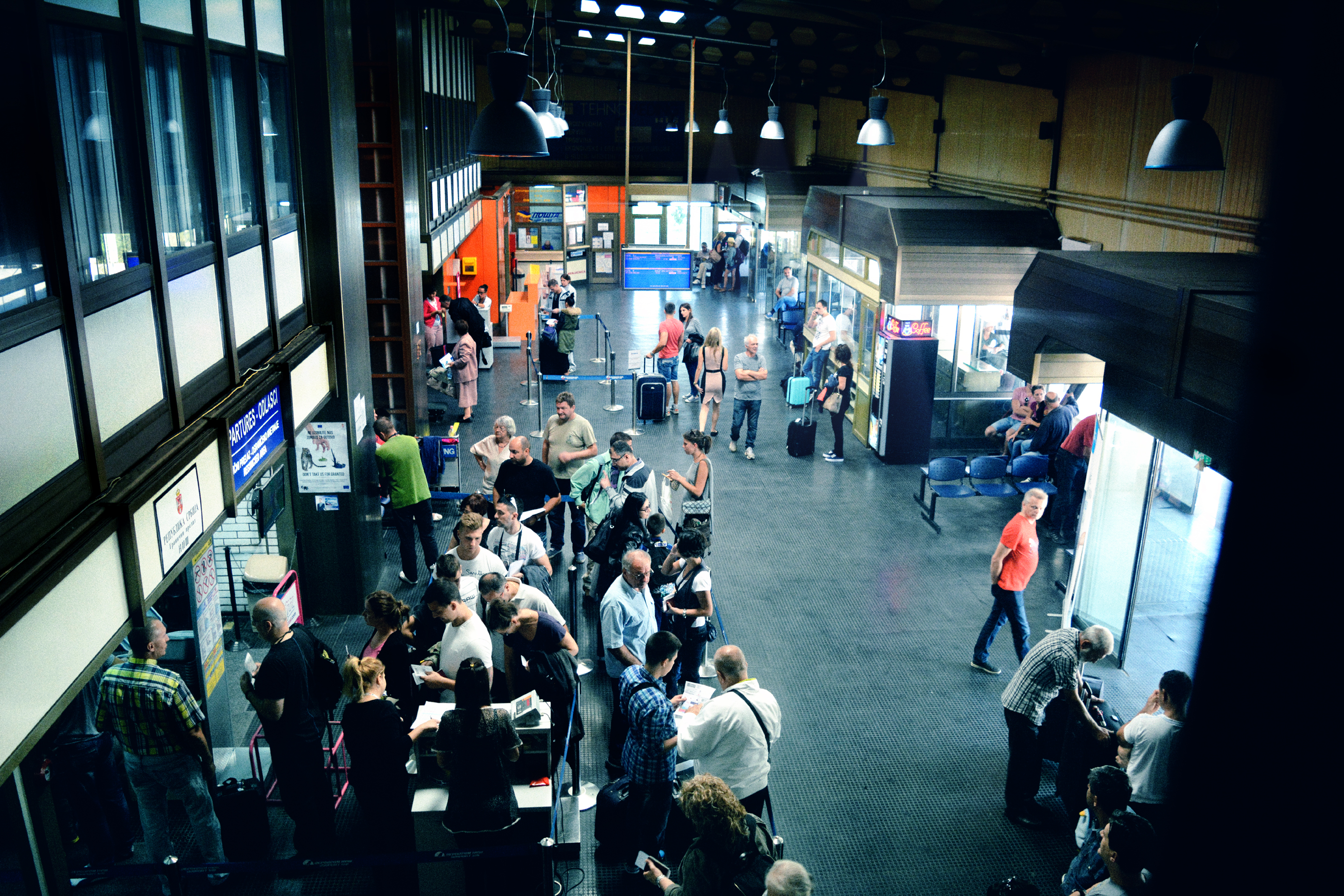
Interior of the since replaced passenger terminal in 2015.

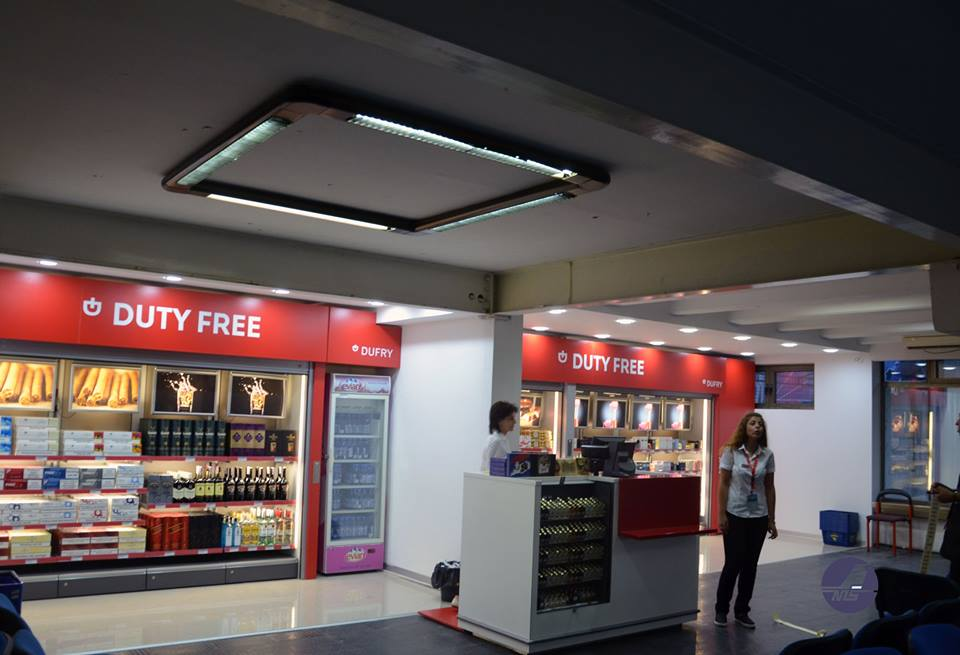
Duty Free shop

=== Early years ===
In 1912, the Air Command, the first aerial unit of the Kingdom of Serbia's military, was established in Niš, and a site near the village of Trupale, 8 kilometres away from the town, was selected as the site of the first airport. Construction began in 1923 on a new airport, located in Medoševac, where the airport is currently located. Ahead of the founding of Yugoslavia's national airline, Niš was designated in plans from 1927 as a stop on one of the highest-priority routes. In 1935, Aeroput included a stop in Niš on flights between Belgrade and Skopje.

Following World War II, the airport was used as a military base. Among other units, it was a base for the 63rd Paratroop Brigade and 119th Aviation Brigade. A portion of the airport is still used by the Serbian Air Force and Air Defence. In 1952, at the site of today's airport, the first concrete runway, measuring 1,500 m (4,921 ft), was built and used for military flights. In order to maintain the pace with the development of military as well as civil aircraft, in 1972 the length of the runway was extended to 2,200 m (7,218 ft) to accommodate larger contemporary commercial aircraft.

In the 1970s, the airport was used for occasional service to the Adriatic coast. By the 1980s, this occasional service led the local authorities to recognize the needs of the people living in Niš as well as Southern and Eastern Serbia and took into account the economic development of the city. The association of economic and political entities prepared detailed terms and in 1986 made a decision on establishing the entity "Airport Niš".

The terminal building as well as the ancillary support facilities were built and opened to service in 1986. This project also included the asphalt coated runway and built-in system of lights that provided visual descent guidance during runway approaches at night. The development of air traffic in Niš was not initiated just by JAT Yugoslav Airlines, but also by Slovenian company Inex-Adria Airways (Adria Airways nowadays), although both were domestic airlines back then.

=== Breakup of Yugoslavia ===
The Breakup of Yugoslavia at the beginning of the 1990s brought a sharp decrease in travelling to the Adriatic Sea, Ljubljana and Zagreb, once the busiest routes from Niš. This was followed by United Nations sanctions imposed on Serbia and Montenegro which included a ban on international air travel. In these circumstances the volume of traffic reached its lowest point with the only route being to Tivat Airport during the summer period. In 1998, the traffic volume increased owing to the heavy air traffic from Pristina International Airport which was out of use because of numerous foggy days during which the traffic was successfully carried out from Niš. The airport was heavily damaged during the 1999 NATO bombing of Yugoslavia.

The airport was reopened in 2003 with the financial assistance from the government of Norway. Damage sustained during the bombing was repaired, including the building of a new control tower and renewal of the terminal building.

In 2004, Jat Airways and Montenegro Airlines resumed flights from Niš to Zürich, Paris, and Tivat. In 2010, Wind Jet connected the airport with Forlì, Italy while Montenegro Airlines linked it with Podgorica on a daily basis. The route to Podgorica was discontinued in 2013 because of low passenger numbers. For more than two years (2014–2015) there were only charter flights to and from Niš.

=== Since 2015 ===
The expansion in traffic began in 2015 when low-cost airline Wizz Air launched flights to Basel and Malmö. In 2016, Ryanair announced flights to Berlin, marking the airlines entry into the Serbian market. Later that year both Wizz Air and Ryanair announced more flights from Niš, respectively Wizz Air to Dortmund, Eindhoven, Memmingen and Ryanair to Weeze, Milan Bergamo and Bratislava. In the first 8 months of 2016 Niš experienced triple-digit growth in passenger traffic. In October 2016, Turkish Cargo, the airline for the transport of cargo which is a part of Turkish Airlines commenced scheduled cargo service between Niš and Istanbul. In November 2016, Swiss International Air Lines announced flights to Zürich, operated by the Airbus 320. In December 2016, Swiss got direct competition when Germania Flug announced flights to Zürich, starting June 2017 operated by the Airbus 319. However, since 2020 no airlines operates services to Zürich.

As of 2019, plans existed for Niš Constantine the Great Airport to be linked to twelve more European cities, after Government of Serbia publish document about lines of public interests (PSO). Companies with the best offers will be granted 5 million euros. Twelve destinations of public interest are Frankfurt, Rome, Hannover, Ljubljana, Bologna, Budapest, Göteborg, Friedrichshafen, Karlsruhe, Salzburg, Nuremberg, Tivat. Currently, the airport serves the total of fourteen regular non stop destinations in eight countries during the whole year, plus four seasonal and three seasonal charter flights during peak summer months.

In August 2026, Ryanair announced it will withdraw from Serbian market and terminate its four routes from Niš.

=== Terminal expansion ===
In December 2016, it was announced that Constantine the Great Airport airport began overhaul of its terminal by expanding check-in and boarding space, as well as building a new exterior and fixing the roof. The project is being funded jointly by the Government of Serbia and local authorities.

As of 2022, progress has been made in construction of the new Airport terminal. The new terminal will span over an area of 7,160 m^{2} (77,100 sq ft) and will feature ten check-in desks, self-check-in stations, eight passport control booths, four passenger gates, one VIP gate, one air bridge and a luggage sorting facility. The new terminal is set to be completed in 2024 and the expansion will enable the Airport to handle up to 1.5 million passenger annually. In 2023, it was announced that SMATSA (Serbia and Montenegro Air Traffic Services Agency) plans to start construction in 2024 of a new control tower and an instrument landing system (ILS), which provides guidance to aircraft approaching and landing on a runway during low ceilings or reduced visibility due to fog, rain or snow.

The new terminal building was inaugurated in July 2024.

== Airlines and destinations ==
=== Passenger ===
The following airlines operate regular scheduled, seasonal and charter flights from Niš Constantine the Great Airport:

Airlines	Destinations
Air Serbia	Belgrade, Cologne/Bonn, Hahn, Istanbul, Ljubljana, Malta, Vienna; Seasonal: Athens, Tivat; Seasonal charter: Antalya, Monastir
Swiss International Air Lines	Seasonal: Zürich
Wizz Air	Basel/Mulhouse, Dortmund, Memmingen

=== Cargo ===
Airlines	Destinations
My Freighter	Ürümqi

== Statistics ==
Year	Passengers	Change	Aircraft movements	Change	Cargo (t)	Change
2004	19,040	Steady	284	Steady	147	Steady
2005	26,787	▲41%	315	▲11%	452	▲207%
2006	35,518	▲33%	382	▲12%	112	▼75%
2007	30,453	▼14%	456	▲19%	448	▲300%
2008	22,870	▼24%	353	▼23%	163	▼64%
2009	17,159	▼25%	349	▼1%	390	▲139%
2010	23,627	▲38%	558	▲60%	1,554	▲298%
2011	25,112	▲6%	591	▲6%	705	▼66%
2012	27,426	▲9%	781	▲32%	322	▼54%
2013	21,700	▼21%	497	▼36%	343	▲10%
2014	1,335	▼93%	271	▼45%	285	▼19%
2015	36,200	▲2,611%	526	▲94%	553	▲91%
2016	124,917	▲345%	722	▲37%	1,967	▲355%
2017	331,582	▲165.4%	1,477	▲104.6%	2,537	▲29.3%
2018	351,582	▲6%	1,417	▼4%	688	▼74.5%
2019	422,255	▲20%	1,967	▲39%	1,180	▲71.5%
2020	154,233	▼63%	1,011	▼49%	523	▼56%
2021	146,296	▼5%	1,040	▲3%	310	▼32.2%
2022	389,022	▲166%	1,928	▲85%	91	▼70%
2023	448,312	▲15.24%	3,974	▲3.06%	70	▼24.08%
2024	357,313	▼20.3%	3,486	▼12.28%	425	▲507.14%
2025	393,102	▲10%	3,836	▲10%	2,822	▲564%

== Niš Air Base ==
The Sergeant-pilot Mihajlo Petrović Air Base (Serbian: Војни аеродром наредник-пилот Михајло Петровић, romanized: Vojni aerodrom narednik-pilot Mihajlo Petrović), commonly known as Niš Air Base (Serbian: Војни аеродром Ниш, romanized: Vojni aerodrom Niš) is located at the airport. Operated by the Serbian Air Force and Air Defence, base is home to the 119th Mixed Helicopter Squadron "Dragons" of the 98th Air Brigade. It is also home to the elite 63rd Parachute Brigade, special forces unit.

== Emergency Response Centre ==
In 2009, the Serbian Ministry of Internal Affairs and the Russian Ministry of Emergency Situations established a joint Serbian-Russian Emergency Response Centre at the Niš Constantine the Great Airport, also known as Russian-Serbian Humanitarian Center. In 2011, a Russian Mil Mi-26 and Beriev Be-200 were dispatched to this centre for aerial firefighting duties in the region. The centre was put into operation in 2012.

== Ground transport ==
Two bus lines operated by the city public bus company connect the airport to the city center and most of the Niš suburbs — line 34A (Airport-Central Bus Station-Central Railway station-Airport) and 34B (Airport-Central Railway station-Central Bus Station-Airport). The airport terminal has a parking lot. Railway passes 100 meters from the airport, but doesn't have a stop nearby.

== See also ==
- List of airports in Serbia
- Airports of Serbia
- Transport in Serbia
- Air Serbia
