= Medoševac (Niš) =

Medoševac Медошевац
- Village
- Location within Serbia
- Coordinates: 43°19′19″N 21°51′25″E
- Country: Serbia
- District: Nišava District
- Municipality: Niš
- City municipality: Crveni Krst

Population (2011)
  - Total: 2,674
- Time zone: UTC+1 (CET)
  - Summer (DST): UTC+2 (CEST)

Medoševac is a village located in the municipality of Crveni Krst in the area of the city of Niš in the Nišava District. It is located in the western quadrant of Niš, on the right bank of Nišava, away from in the 20th century it was a village, then until the 1970s it was a suburban mixed settlement, and after 1970 it was a city quarter (part of the city). According to the census from 2002, there were 2,704 inhabitants (according to the census from 1991, there were 2,564 inhabitants).

== History ==
Medoševac was mentioned as a village back in the time of Ottoman rule. The Turkish census of 1498 found it with 41 houses, 19 unmarried, 2 Muslim and 4 widowed houses. From the income from spelage, tax on wheat, wheat, rye, barley, oats, millet, sorghum, sorghum from beehives, livestock, hemp, fruit, tax on pigs, sorghum from lentils, onions and garlic, tax on barrels, vegetable garden, grass, firewood, baduhava and wedding party, the village paid 6,421 akçe. According to the Turkish census of the nahiya of Niš from 1516, the place was one of 111 villages of the nahiya and had the same name as today, and had 50 houses, 9 widowed households, 12 single households. From the census of 1564, it can be seen that two Muslim chifluks were formed in the village.

During the Austro-Turkish war at the end of the 17th century, the villages of Medoševac, Popovac and Donji Bubanj were displaced, because the census in the Niš registry office in 1710 does not mention them. But while Medoševac and Popovac were rebuilt with Donji Bubanj, that was no longer the case. That Medoševac was rebuilt in the first half of the 18th century can be seen from a French plan (engraving) probably from 1737, in which it was drawn and entered as Medoschewze.

It is also mentioned as one of the burned villages in the Serbian-Turkish war of 1876/77. Before the liberation (1878), Mustafa Bey ruled the village. He is the grandson of the powerful Hafis Pasha who was beaten by Karađorđe in the battle of Ivankovac. Medoševac was part of their family estate. Hafiz Pasha still built a one-story round stone tower in Medoševac and, as Kanitz says, "he spent summer days with his wives with a beautiful view of the surroundings."

After the liberation, General Đuro Horvatović bought 60 hectares of land in the village and formed a large agricultural farm on it. Hafiz Pasha's tower stood until 1932/33. when, since it was on the edge of the land that was purchased for the airport (about twenty meters outside the current Bogdan Blagojevića street), it was demolished. The stone material of the tower was used for military construction at the airport.
