= Slavoljub Marjanović =

Serbian chess grandmaster (1955–2026)

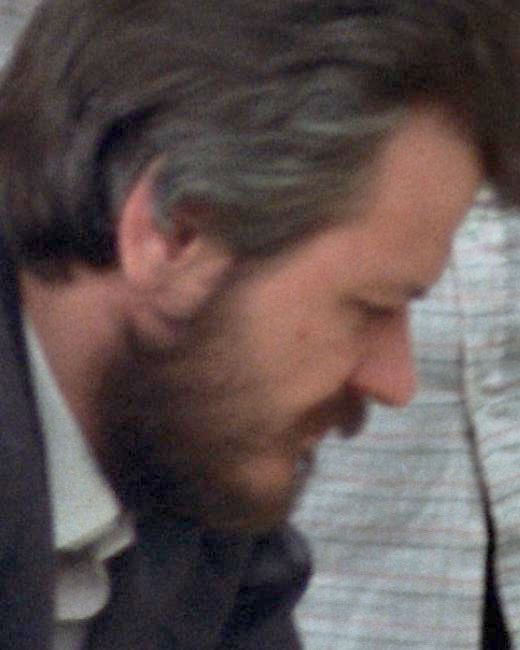
- Marjanović in 1982

Personal information
- Born: 6 January 1955 Lalinac, PR Serbia, FPR Yugoslavia
- Died: 8 March 2026 (aged 71) Niš, Serbia

Chess career
- Country: Yugoslavia → Serbia
- Title: Grandmaster (1978)
- FIDE rating: 2462 (August 2026)
- Peak rating: 2540 (July 1985)

Slavoljub Marjanović (Serbian: Славољуб Марјановић; 6 January 1955 – 8 March 2026) was a Serbian chess Grandmaster (GM) (1978), Yugoslav Chess Championship winner (1985), Chess Olympiad team bronze medal winner (1980), and FIDE Senior Trainer (2004).

== Biography ==
Marjanović learned to play chess at the age of five. He three times in a row won the Yugoslav Junior Chess Championship (1971–1973). He played for Yugoslavia in the World Junior Chess Championships, where in 1973 he shared 3rd–5th place, but in 1974 shared 2nd–4th place. Marjanović was winner of many international chess tournaments, including winning Belgrade (1979), Vrnjačka Banja (1983) and Rome (1988).

In 1977, he was awarded the FIDE International Master (IM) title and received the FIDE Grandmaster (GM) title a year later. In 1985, in Novi Sad he won the Yugoslav Chess Championship. In 1987, in Subotica he participated in the World Chess Championship Interzonal tournament, where ranked in 7th place.

He played for Yugoslavia in the Chess Olympiads:

- In 1980, at first reserve board in the 24th Chess Olympiad in La Valletta (+4, =4, -0) and won team bronze medal,
- In 1984, at second reserve board in the 26th Chess Olympiad in Thessaloniki (+4, =7, -1).

Marjanović played for Yugoslavia in the European Team Chess Championships:

- In 1980, at sixth board in the 7th European Team Chess Championship in Skara (+2, =3, -2).

Also Marjanović played eight times for Yugoslavia in the Men's Chess Balkaniads (1977–1980, 1983–1985, 1988) and in team competition won 6 gold (1978, 1979, 1980, 1983, 1985) and 2 silver (1977, 1988) medals, but in individual competition won 3 gold (1979, 1980, 1988), one silver (1978) and 3 bronze (1977, 1983, 1985) medals.

He was known as a chess trainer. In 2004 he received the title of FIDE Senior Trainer.

Marjanović died on 8 March 2026, at the age of 71.
