= Bubanja =

Bubanja (Serbian Cyrillic: Бубања) is a Montenegro-Serbian surname, derived from bubanj, meaning "drum". It may refer to:

- Vladimir Bubanja (born 1989), Serbian footballer
- Davor Bubanja (born 1987), Slovenian footballer
- Marko Bubanja (born 1996), Austrian judoka

== See also ==
- Bubanj, settlement
