= Crveni Krst concentration camp =

World War II concentration camp

Crveni Krst
- Concentration camp
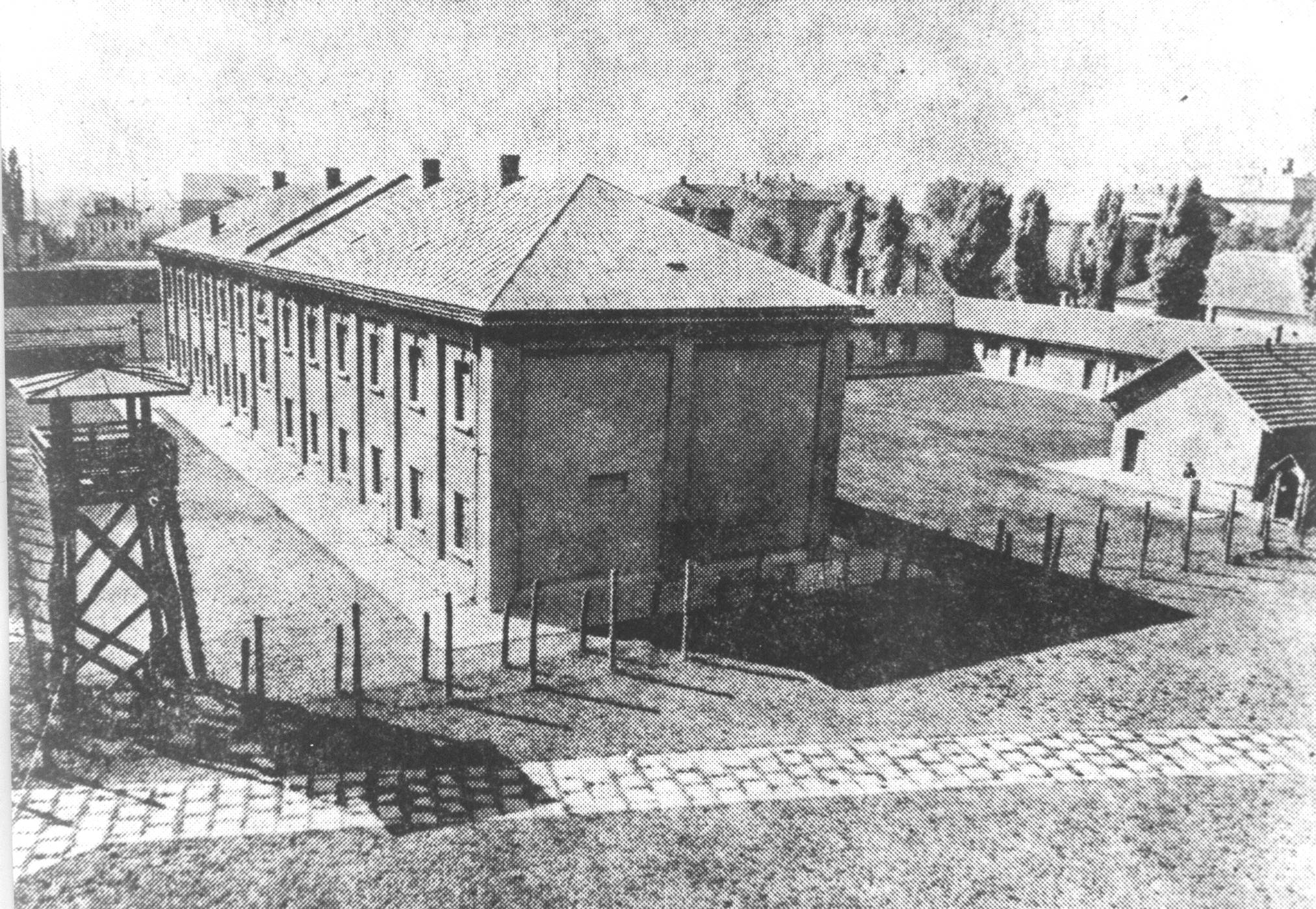
- The facilities of the Crveni Krst concentration camp

- Location of Crveni Krst in contemporary Serbia
- Coordinates: 43°19′49″N 21°53′19″E
- Location: Niš, Territory of the Military Commander in Serbia
- Operated by: German Gestapo
- Operational: 1941–1944
- Inmates: Primarily Serbs, Jews and Roma and anti-fascists
- Number of inmates: 30,000–35,000
- Killed: c. 10,000
- Liberated by: Yugoslav Partisans, 1944
- Notable inmates: Želimir Žilnik

Cultural Heritage of Serbia
- Official name: Niš concentration camp (Memorial complex "12 February")
- Type: Cultural Monument of Exceptional Importance
- Designated: 13 May 1977
- Reference no.: SK 240

Crveni Krst (lit. 'Red Cross concentration camp'; German: KZ Rotes Kreuz; Serbian: Логор Црвени крст, romanized: Logor Crveni krst), also known as the Niš concentration camp (German: Lager Nich), was a concentration camp operated by the German Gestapo located in the Crveni Krst municipality of Niš, in German-occupied Serbia. It was used to hold captured Serbs, Jews, Roma and anti-fascists during World War II. Established in October 1941, between 30,000 and 35,000 people were detained within it during the war. It was liberated by the Yugoslav Partisans in 1944. More than 10,000 people are thought to have been killed in the camp over the course of its existence.

Crveni Krst is one of the few Nazi concentration camps in Europe whose facilities have been preserved in their entirety, and the only one in the former Yugoslavia to hold this distinction. After the war, a memorial to the victims of the camp was erected at Bubanj, where many inmates were shot. A memorial museum was opened on the former campgrounds in 1967, and in 1979, the campgrounds were declared a Cultural Monument of Exceptional Importance and came under the protection of the Socialist Republic of Serbia. A film detailing the events at the camp titled Lager Niš was released in 1987. It was the only film revolving specifically around concentration camp inmates ever released in Yugoslavia. In 2012, it was announced by the Government of Serbia that the site would be subjected to restorations to prevent it from deteriorating further.

== Background ==
On 6 April 1941, Axis forces invaded the Kingdom of Yugoslavia. The Royal Yugoslav Army was quickly defeated and Belgrade was captured by 12 April. The country was then occupied and dismembered, with the Wehrmacht establishing the Territory of the Military Commander in Serbia under a government of military occupation. The territory included most of Serbia proper, with the addition of the northern part of Kosovo (centred on Kosovska Mitrovica), and the Banat. It was the only area of partitioned Yugoslavia in which the German occupants established a military government. This was done to exploit the key rail and riverine transport routes that passed through it, and due to its valuable resources, particularly non-ferrous metals. The Military Commander in Serbia appointed Serbian puppet governments to "carry on administrative chores under German direction and supervision". On 29 August 1941, the Germans appointed the Government of National Salvation (Serbian: Vlada Nacionalnog Spasa, Влада Националног Спаса) under General Milan Nedić, to replace the short-lived Commissioner Administration. A pre-war politician who was known to have pro-Axis leanings, Nedić was selected because the Germans believed his fierce anti-Communism and military experience could be used to quell an armed uprising in the Serbian region of Šumadija.

Unable to bring reinforcements due to the need to send soldiers to the Eastern Front, the Germans responded to the revolt by declaring that one-hundred Serbs would be executed for every German soldier killed and that fifty would be executed for every German soldier wounded. By October 1941, this policy had resulted in the deaths of 25,000 Serbs. The Germans also targeted Jews, who were subjected to forced labour, punitive taxing, and restrictive decrees. Jews were also registered with German authorities and forced to wear identifying armbands while Jewish property was confiscated. They, and to a lesser degree Roma, were targeted on racial grounds, although most were not killed outright. Following the start of the anti-German uprising, German propaganda began associating Jews with communism and anti-German ideology. Executions and arrests of Serbian Jews followed.

When the Germans occupied the southeastern Serbian city of Niš in April 1941, they prohibited Roma from leaving their homes without an identifying yellow armband bearing the word Zigeuner (Gypsy). German soldiers then went through the Romani quarter and forcibly shaved the heads of all Roma in Niš under the pretext that they had lice.

== Operation ==
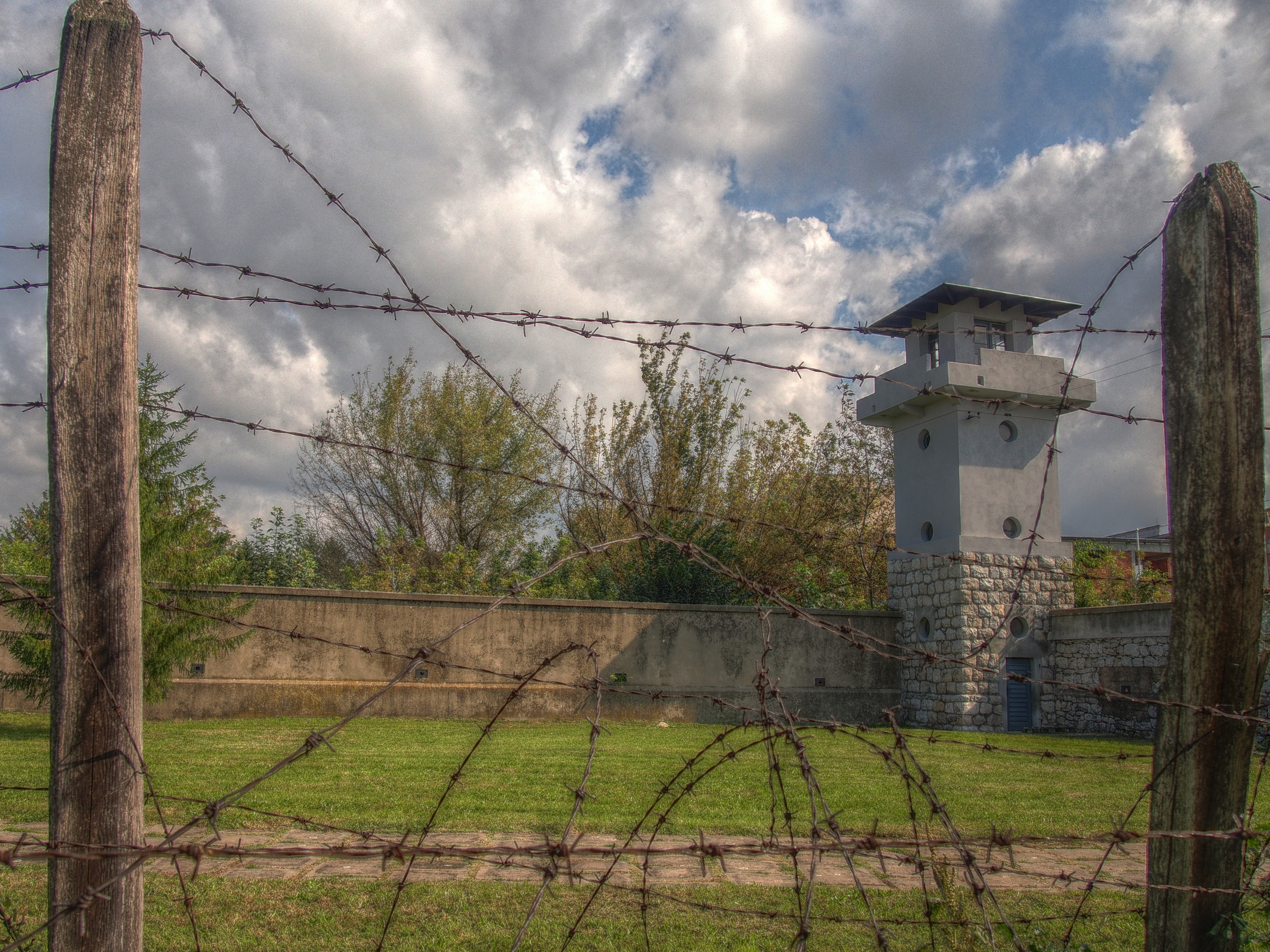
Courtyard with watchtower

Originally intended as a transit camp (German: Durchgangslager), by September 1941, the function of Crveni Krst was transformed into that of a concentration camp. The camp was officially opened the following month by the German Gestapo on the site of a military barracks in Niš. The camp was named after a Red Cross facility located near the campgrounds. The majority of the inmates were Serb political prisoners. Also imprisoned were Jews from Niš and other parts of Serbia. Romani men, women and children were subjected to a similar fate. Among the detainees were pregnant women. One of the children born in the camp was the future filmmaker Želimir Žilnik. Both of his parents were Partisans who were arrested for their anti-fascist activities and were later killed.

During the first month of the camp's existence, between 200 and 300 local and foreign Jews living in Niš were brought to Crveni Krst. More arrived later from towns in the Serbian interior. Laws passed by the Germans that September ensured that they would be detained separately from other inmates. The Germans began executing adult male inmates in early November. The historian Martin Winstone estimates that 1,000 Jewish men were shot during this time. In January, a group of Partisans attacked the camp, freeing a small number of Jewish prisoners. On 12 February 1942, 147 inmates attempted to escape. Forty-two were killed in the process, but the remaining 105 successfully managed to evade capture. This was one of the largest mass escapes from any Nazi camp. The Germans retaliated by executing the remaining prisoners. In this second round of mass executions, large numbers of Serb and Jewish inmates were killed and their bodies were dumped into mass graves that the Germans had forced Romani prisoners to dig. Romani inmates were also killed during this round of executions, with as many as 100 being shot in a single day.

In the spring of 1942, the women and children detained at Crveni Krst were transferred to the Sajmište concentration camp on the outskirts of Belgrade, where they were murdered using gas vans. Crveni Krst remained in operation over the following two years before being liberated by the Partisans in 1944. Winstone estimates that around 30,000 inmates passed through it over the course of its operation. Other sources report a figure as high as 35,000. An estimated 10,000 prisoners were killed.

== Legacy ==
Crveni Krst is one of the few Nazi concentration camps in Europe whose facilities have been preserved in their entirety, and the only one in the former Yugoslavia to hold this distinction. After the war, a memorial to the victims of the camp was erected at the Bubanj execution grounds. The site, known as the Bubanj Memorial Park, is now marked by three large sculpted fists. A memorial museum was opened on the former campgrounds in 1967. The set up was prepared by the curator historians Ivana Gruden Miletinjević and Nebojša Ozimić. In 1979, the campgrounds were declared a Cultural Monument of Exceptional Importance and came under the protection of the Socialist Republic of Serbia. A film detailing the events at the camp titled Lager Niš was released in Yugoslavia in 1987. It was the only film revolving specifically around inmates in a concentration camp ever released in the country. In 2012, it was announced by the Government of Serbia that the site would be subjected to restorations to prevent it from deteriorating further.

== Gallery ==
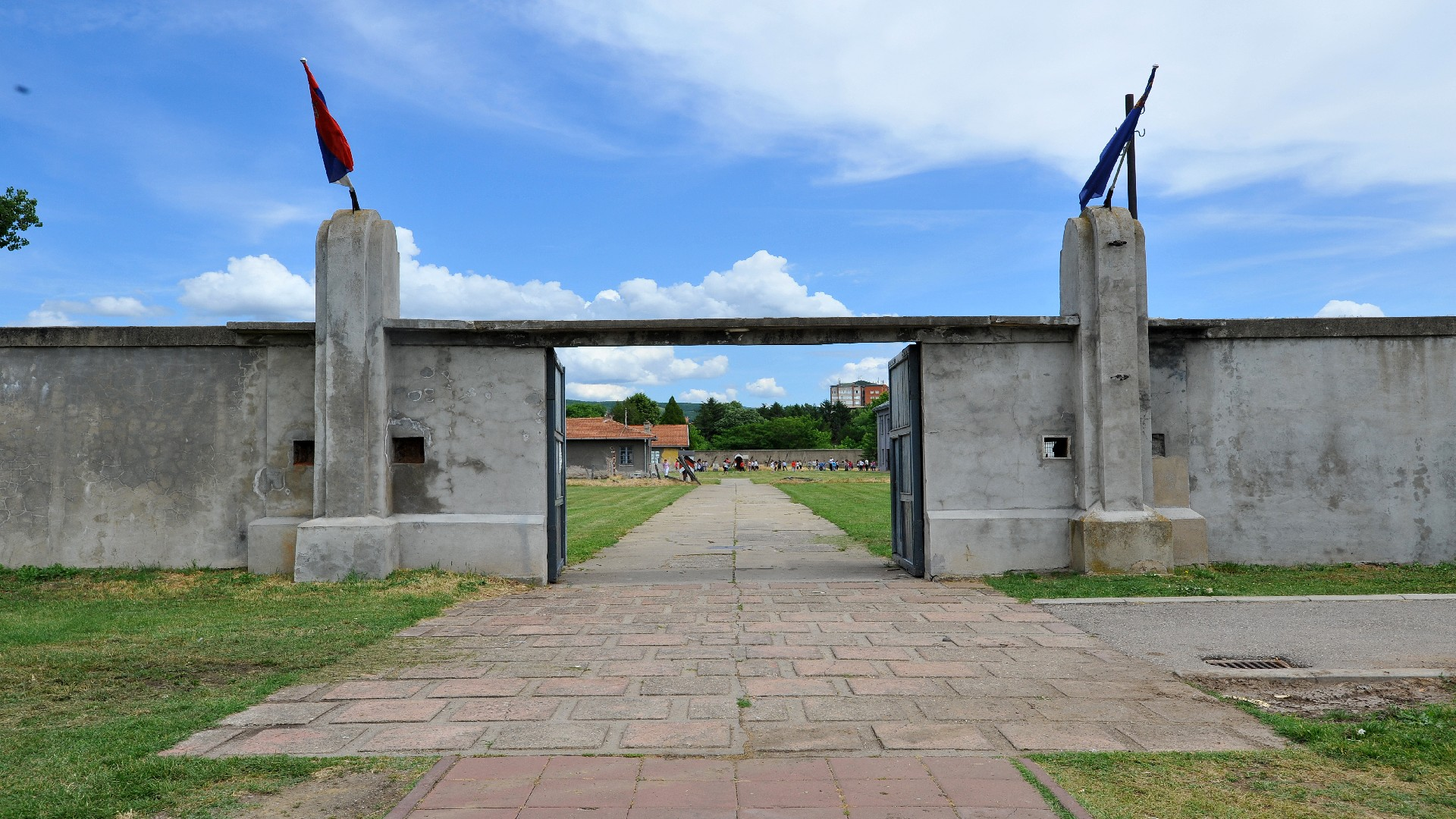
Main entrance

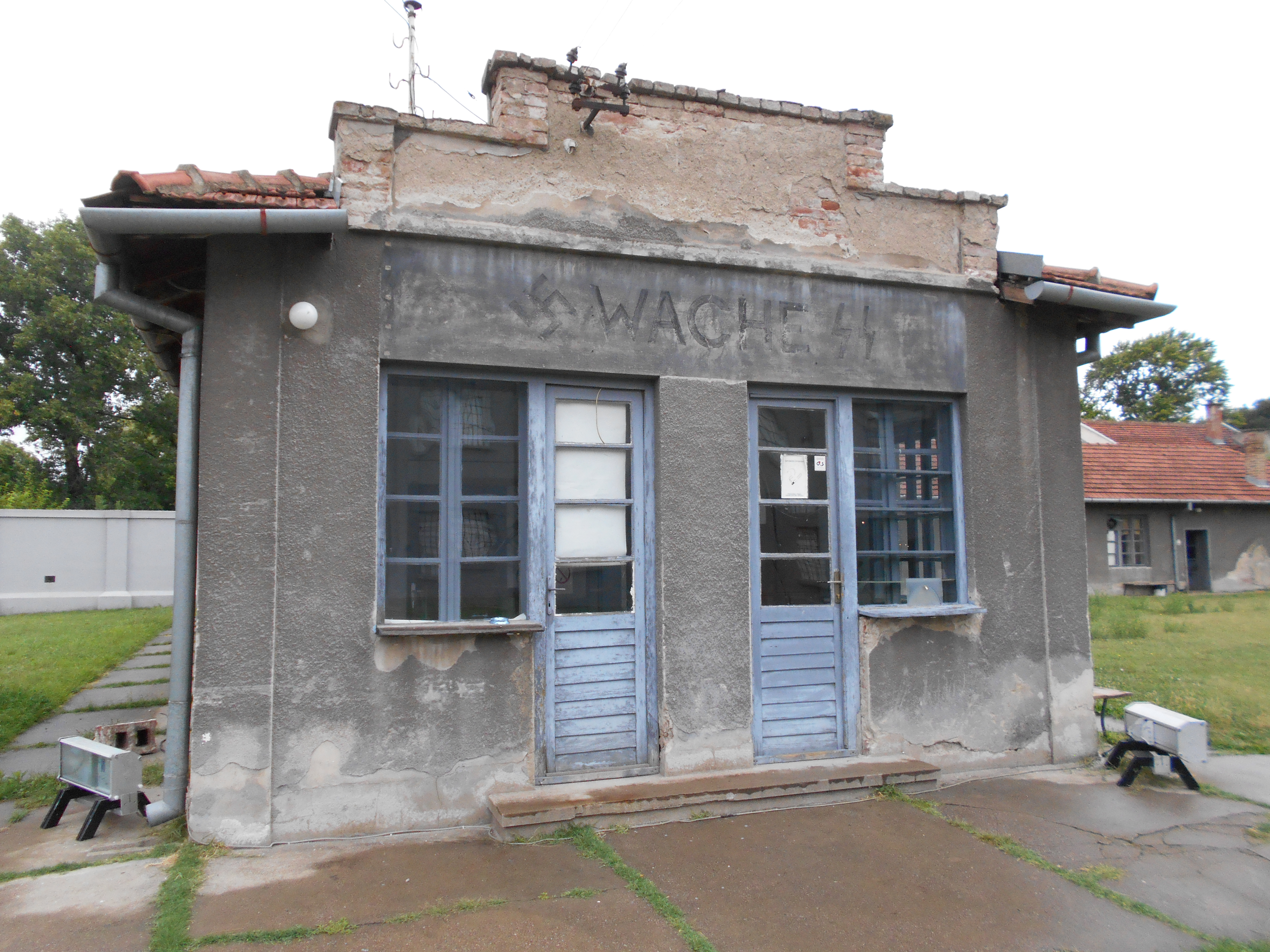
Wache (guard)

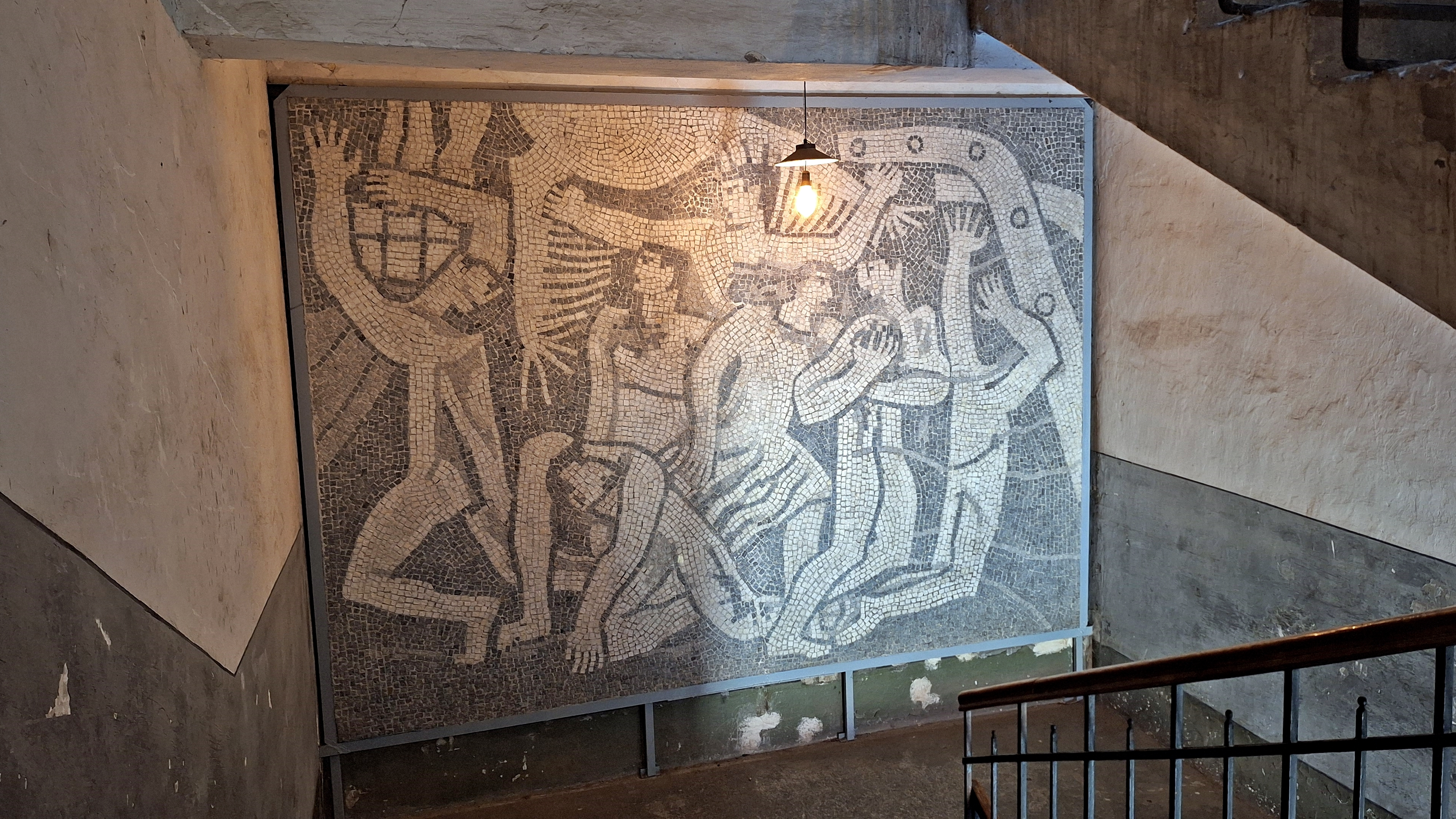
A mosaic at the camp site

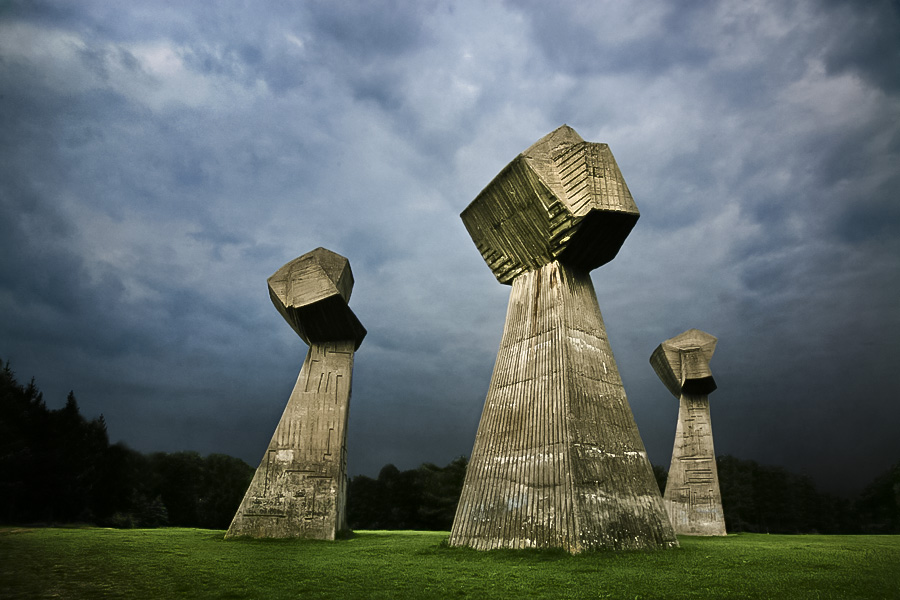
Bubanj Memorial Park
