= Staro Groblje =

- Interactive map of Staro Groblje
- Country: Serbia
- Region: Southern and Eastern Serbia
- District: Nišava
- City: Niš
- Municipality: Palilula
- Time zone: UTC+1 (CET)
  - Summer (DST): UTC+2 (CEST)

Staro Groblje (Serbian Cyrillic: Cтapo Гpoбљe) is a neighborhood of the city of Niš, Serbia. It is located within the municipality of Palilula. The correct "borders" of the neighborhood are not known but many people consider it to be from Zmaja of noćaja/Змаја од ноћаја street up to the old cemetery which the neighborhood got the name from.

Since the neighborhood does not have any municipal status the population is unknown.

== Location ==
Staro Groblje is located in the Southwest part of Niš. It is bordered on the west by the neighborhood of Bubanj, on the south by the neighborhood of Tutunović Podrum, on the east by the neighborhood of Palilula and on the north by the railroad connecting Niš with Sofia, Bulgaria.

== History ==
Staro Groblje was built mostly after 1878. It is named for an old 14 hectare cemetery located there.

== Characteristics ==
The neighborhood is mostly residential. The terrain is partly flat and partly on a hill.

== Development ==
The University of Niš Faculty of Occupational Safety is located in the neighborhood. European route E80 follows the city boulevard parallel to railroad.
