= Palilula, Niš =

Coordinates: 43°18′32″N 21°51′54″E

Palilula Палилула
- City municipality
- City municipality of Palilula; Градска општина Палилула
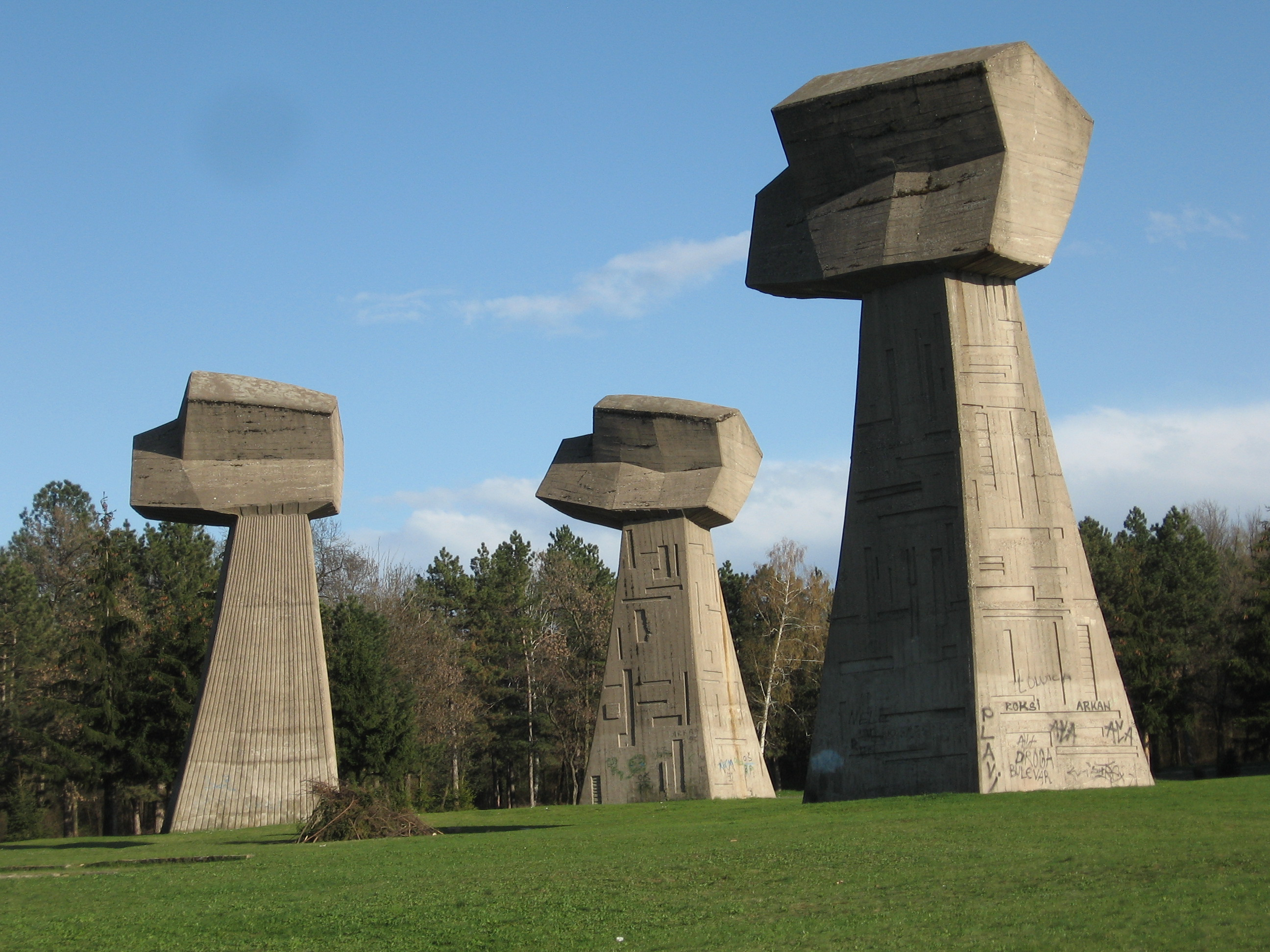
- Bubanj Memorial Park

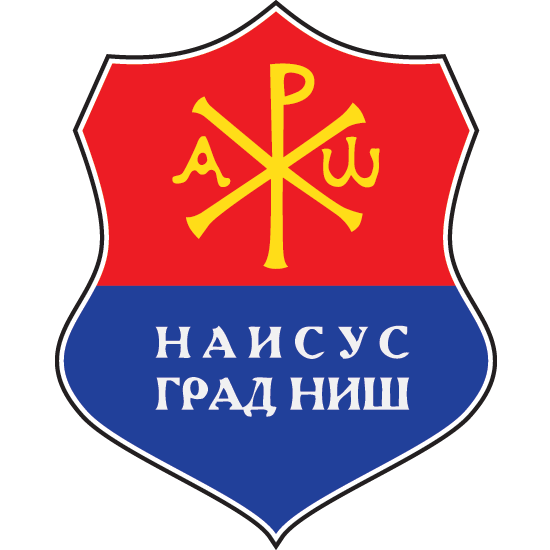
- Coat of arms

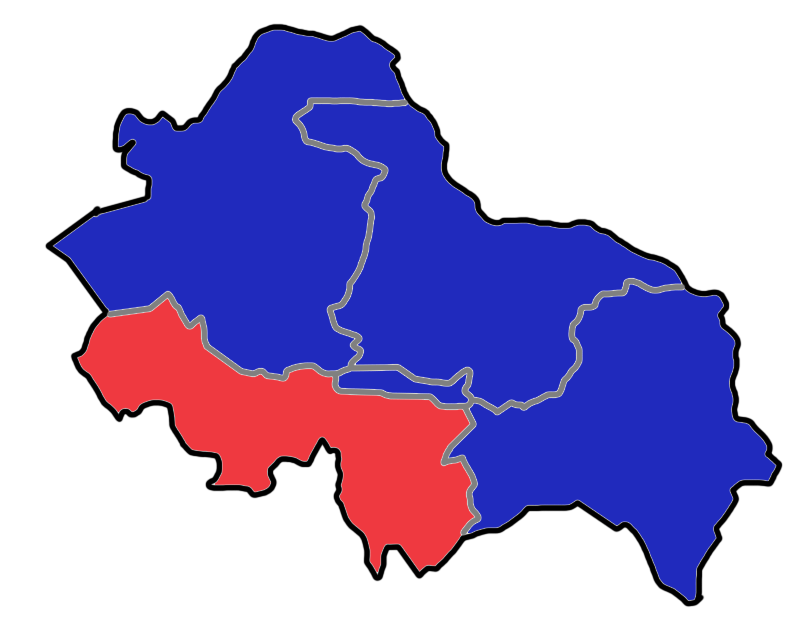
- Location of the municipality of Palilula within City of Niš
- Country: Serbia
- Region: Southern and Eastern Serbia
- District: Nišava
- City: Niš
- Founded: 6 June 2002
- Settlements: 16

Government
  - Mayor: Bratislav Vučković (SNS)

Area
  - Municipality: 116.64 km^{2} (45.03 sq mi)

Population (2011 census)
  - Urban: 54,597
  - Municipality: 73,801
- Time zone: UTC+1 (CET)
  - Summer (DST): UTC+2 (CEST)
- Postal code: 18000
- Area code: +381(0)18
- Car plates: NI
- Website: palilula.eu

Palilula (Serbian Cyrillic: Палилула, pronounced [pǎlilula]) is one of five city municipalities which constitute the city of Niš. It has a population of 73,801 inhabitants. It was formed on 6 June 2002.

== Geography ==
The municipality borders Crveni Krst and Medijana municipalities in the north, Niška Banja municipality in the east, Gadžin Han and Doljevac municipalities in the south, and Merošina municipality in the south-west.

== Demographics ==
According to the 2011 census, the municipality had a population of 73,801 inhabitants, with 54,597 in the eponymous settlement.

=== Settlements ===
The municipality consists of 16 settlements, all of which are classified as rural, except for Palilula, which is a part of a larger urban settlement of Niš.

- Bebatovo, population 327
- Bubanj, population 548
- Vukmanovo, population 340
- Gabrovac, population 1,238
- Gornje Međurovo, population 1,011
- Deveti Maj, population 4,795
- Donje Vlase, population 254
- Donje Međurovo, population 1,722
- Krušce, population 931
- Lalinac, population 1,806
- Mramor, population 635
- Mramorski Potok, population 337
- Palilula, population 54,597
- Pasi Poljana, population 2,938
- Suvi Do, population 1,010
- Čokot, population 1,412

=== Neighborhoods ===
Neighborhoods of Palilula include:

- Palilula
- Staro Groblje
- Crni put
- Bubanj
- Ledena Stena
- Delijski Vis
- Apelovac
- Kovanluk
- Tutunović Podrum
- Kalac Brdo
- Suvi Do

== See also ==
- Subdivisions of Serbia
- Niš
