= Crni put, Niš =

Crni put Црни пут
- Urban neighbourhood
- Country: Serbia
- Region: Southern and Eastern Serbia
- District: Nišava
- City: Niš
- Municipality: Palilula
- Construction: In the late 19th century

Crni put (Serbian Cyrillic: Цpни Пут, English: Black road) is a neighborhood of the city of Niš, Serbia. It is located within the municipality of Palilula.

== Location ==
Crni Put neighborhood is located in the central-west parts of the city of Niš. It is flat and bordered on the west by the Industrial zone of MIN and the two Roma neighborhoods "Stocni trg" and "Jevrejsko groblje"(Jewish cemetery), on the south-east by the railway (Belgrade - Niš) and two neighborhoods of "Staro groblje"(Old cemetery) and "Kicevo", and on the north by the Nišava river.

== History ==
Built mostly after 1878, Crni put was the location of the first locomotive servicing workshop in Serbia. In the late 19th century, mud extended to the edges of the city limits and as a result the workshop poured slag from coal production onto the surrounding roads, which became completely black. This led to the neighborhood being named Crni put, (literally "black road"). During World War II this neighborhood was heavily bombed, first in 1941 by Nazi Germany, than in 1944 by the Allies. Niš was also bombarded during the 1999 NATO bombing of Yugoslavia, when it was home to a radio relay station, an airfield, and a fuel depot.

== Characteristics and future development ==
The neighborhood is partly industrial, partly residential, and partly commercial. After World War II the city government decided to reserve the area of this neighborhood for industry and banned construction of any residential buildings. After the victory of the coalition of democratic opposition in the local elections in Niš in 1996, the new city government revised that decision in 1997, partially authorizing the construction of residential buildings and dislocation of open merchandise markets into this neighborhood. There is a plan of further transformation of this neighborhood into commercial zone.
