= Suvi Do (Niš) =

Suvi Do Суви До
- Neighborhood
- Interactive map of Suvi Do
- Country: Serbia
- Region: Southern and Eastern Serbia
- District: Nišava
- City: Niš
- Municipality: Palilula

Population (2011)
  - Total: 1,010
- Time zone: UTC+1 (CET)
  - Summer (DST): UTC+2 (CEST)

Suvi Do (Serbian Cyrillic: Суви До) is a suburban neighbourhood located within the Palilula municipality in the city of Niš, in the Nišava District of Serbia. This neighbourhood is situated approximately 6 kilometers southeast of downtown Niš.

== Transport ==
Suvi Do is well-connected to Niš via the city's public transportation system. The neighbourhood is served by City Transport Line No. 3, which provides direct and efficient access to various parts of Niš, including the city center. This makes commuting easy for residents and facilitates the integration of Suvi Do into the broader urban area of Niš.

== Economy and Industry ==
Suvi Do hosts several large multinational companies.

== History ==
Suvi Do has a history dating back to the Middle Ages. The first recorded mention of the settlement is in a Turkish census from 1498, where it was referred to as Dol, with 10 houses, 2 unmarried men, and 3 widow's houses, contributing a total of 1,682 akçe in taxes. The toponymy of the area, such as Vlaško Brdo, indicates the historical presence of Vlach shepherds, as evidenced by the names of nearby villages like Vukmanovo, Berbatovo, and Donje Vlase.

The liberation of Niš in 1878 found Suvi Do as a small hamlet with an unknown landlord. It was a significant site during the battles for the liberation of Niš from January 4th to 8th, 1878 (Vuči Dol and Kamara).

Until 1949, Suvi Do was a small village. That year marked the establishment of the first industrial facilities for radio and X-ray equipment manufacturing (RR factories), the precursor to the later Electronic Industry (EI). This industrial development, along with its proximity to Niš, spurred the settlement of workers and led to significant socio-economic restructuring, gradually transforming Suvi Do from a traditional rural village to a suburban area with a mixed urban-rural character.

== Demographics ==
As of the 2011 census, Suvi Do had a population of 1,010, showing steady growth from 935 in 2002 and 807 in 1991. The settlement has a predominantly Serbian population.

In 1878, Suvi Do had around 20 households and approximately 150 residents. By 1930, this had increased to 45 households and 275 residents. According to the 2002 census, the village had 848 adults, with an average age of 42.1 years (40.9 for men and 43.3 for women). The average household size was 2.96 members, across 341 households.
