= Ivan Sabolić =

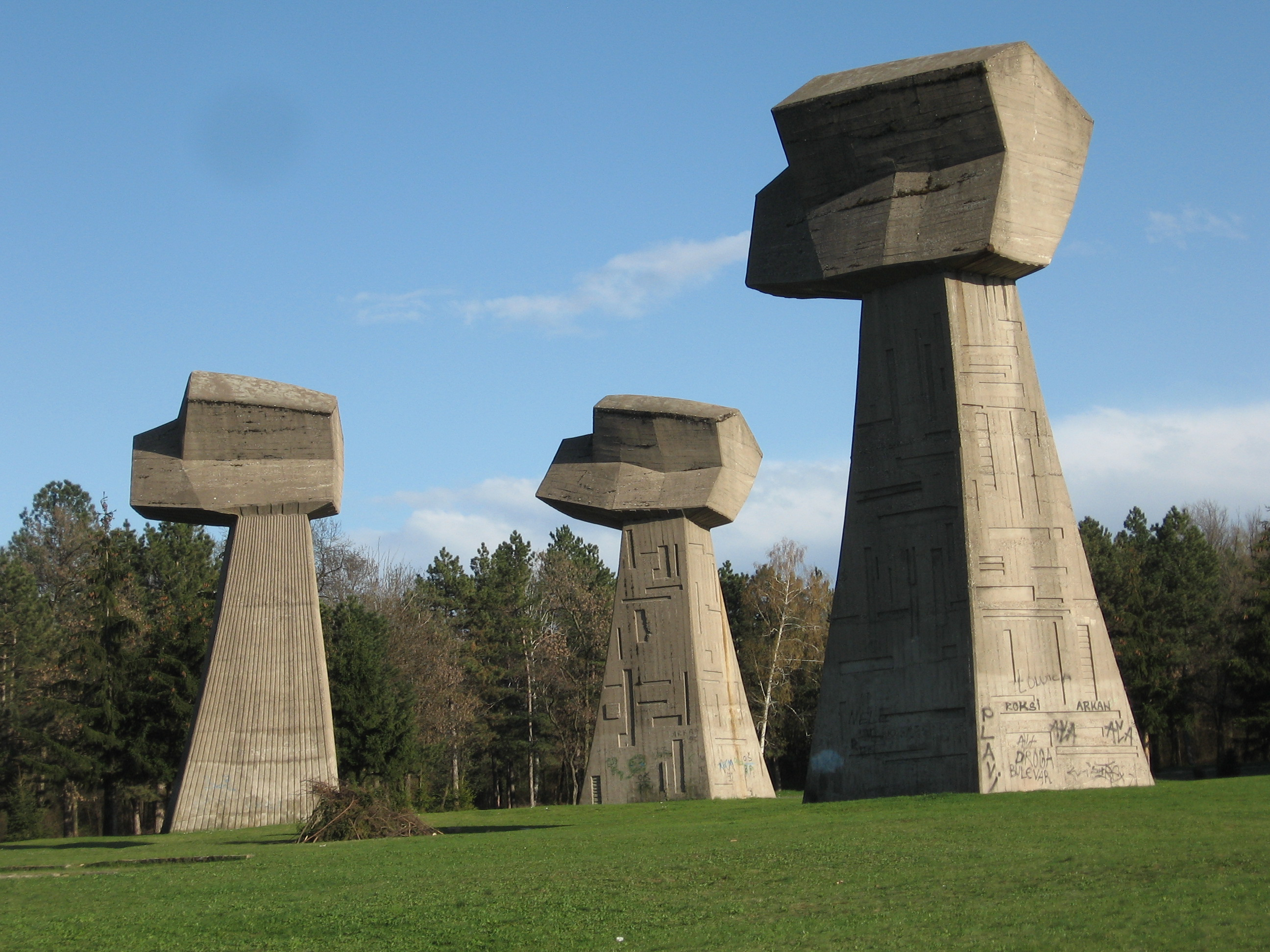
"Three Fists"

Ivan Sabolić (24 August 1921 – 25 June 1986) was a Yugoslavian sculptor, professor and dean of the Academy of Fine Arts Zagreb, head master of the workshop in 1975.

Sabolić was born in Peteranec. Self-taught, he made his first works in clay, including portraits of his father, mother and grandfather, which make up his oldest surviving works. Sabolić was a member of the postwar generation of sculptors who from the mid-20th century sought to escape from the strict framework of socialist realism and commissioned art, and remain faithful to the Croatian tradition.

He made a monument of "Three Fists" on a hill in Bubanj Memorial Park, Palilula municipality of Niš. It opened on October 14, 1963.

Ivan Sabolić died in Zagreb.
