= Bubanj Memorial Park =

Coordinates: 43°18′18″N 21°52′21″E

Memorial Park Bubanj
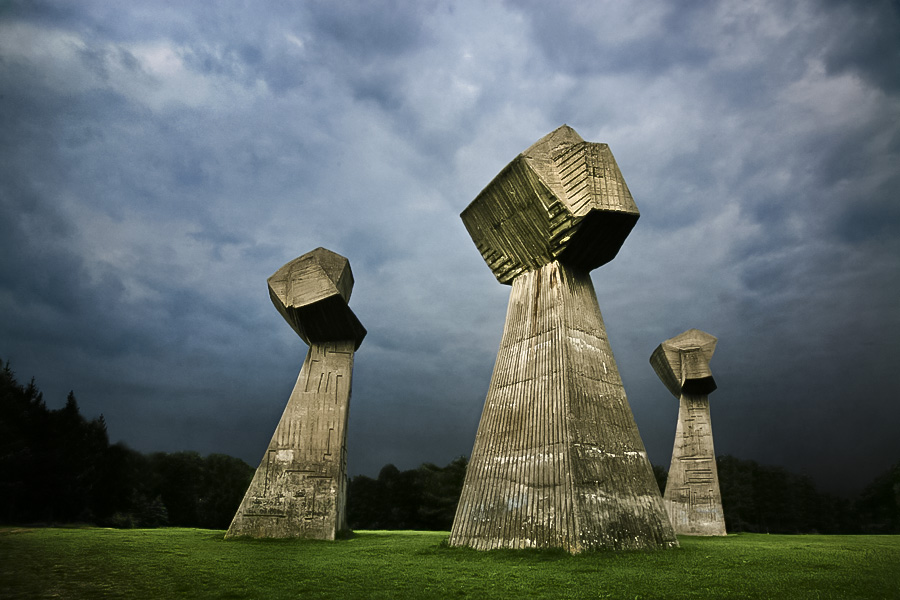
- Three fists monument
- Type: Memorial park
- Location: Palilula, Niš, Serbia
- Built: 1963

Cultural Heritage of Serbia
- Type: Historic Landmark of Exceptional Importance
- Designated: 1973
- Reference no.: ЗМ 7

Memorial Park Bubanj (Serbian: Мемориjални парк Бубањ, Спомен парк Бубањ, Memorijalni park Bubanj, Spomen park Bubanj) is a World War II memorial complex built to commemorate the shooting and execution of more than 10,000 citizens of Niš and people from Serbia and other parts of the country, but according to some data, over 12,000 people, and it is located in Palilula municipality of Niš, Serbia.

== Location ==
Situated on the hill southwest of the Bubanj of Niš, which cut the main road Niš – Skopje, is situated 2 km from the other Serbian Cultural Property of Great Importance, Crveni Krst concentration camp.

== Memorial complex ==
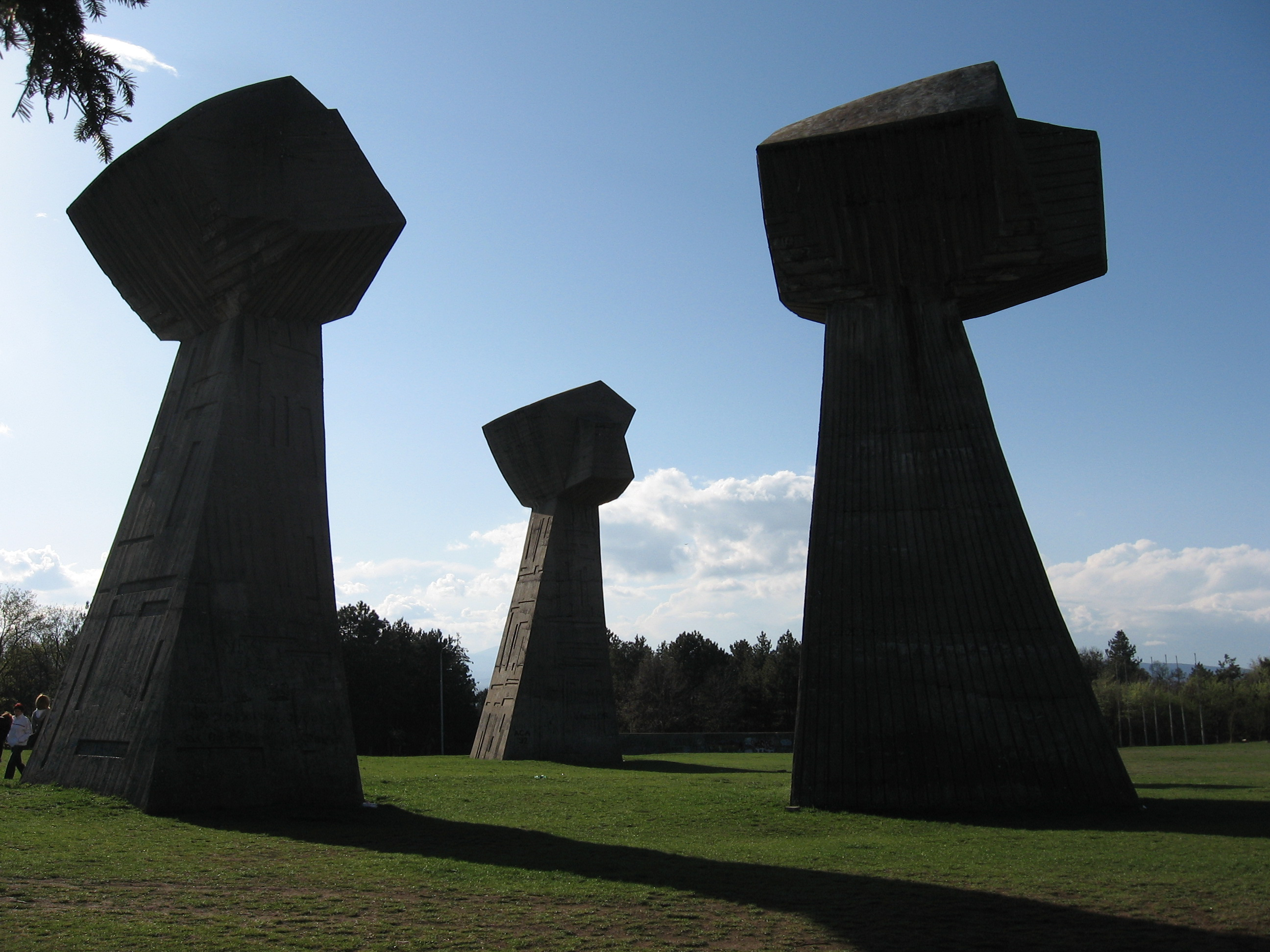
Fists

The complex is arranged as a park, with a memorial trail about half a mile long running through it. The centrepiece of the site is a marble relief measuring 23 by 2.5 metres, with five compositions that symbolize the "killing machine": execution and firing squads, civil revolts, surrender of the German invaders and final victory over the oppressors.

Another dominant feature of the park is three concrete obelisks that symbolize raised hands with clenched fists. Each of the three fists are different sizes, depicting men's, women's and children's hands that defy the enemy, symbolic of the fact entire families were killed at Bubanj.

Nearby there is a summer stage.

== History ==
=== World War II ===
German execution squads established sites in Bubanj forest to which Serbs, Romani and Jews were brought by trucks. Mass exterminations were carried out from February 1942 to September 1944, including about 10,000 inmates and detainees killed by the Special Police and local penal authorities. The entire area is intersected by trenches in which the shooting victims were buried. Before the withdrawal of the Germans as the Red Army advanced into Yugoslavia in 1944, captured Italians were ordered to dig up the trenches and burn the corpses of the victims in order to destroy all traces of the atrocities committed there.

=== Federal Republic of Yugoslavia ===
In 1950, the execution site was originally marked by a memorial pyramid. A new monument, "Three fists", was commissioned by Yugoslav sculptor Ivan Sabolić and was unveiled on 14 October 1963. Bubanj Memorial Park was declared a Historic Landmark of Exceptional Importance in 1979, and it is protected by the Republic of Serbia.

=== Recent history ===
In 2004, a chapel built of glass and metal was added to the complex. It was designed by the architect Alexander Buđevac. The entire memorial hill was redeveloped in 2009.

== Gallery ==
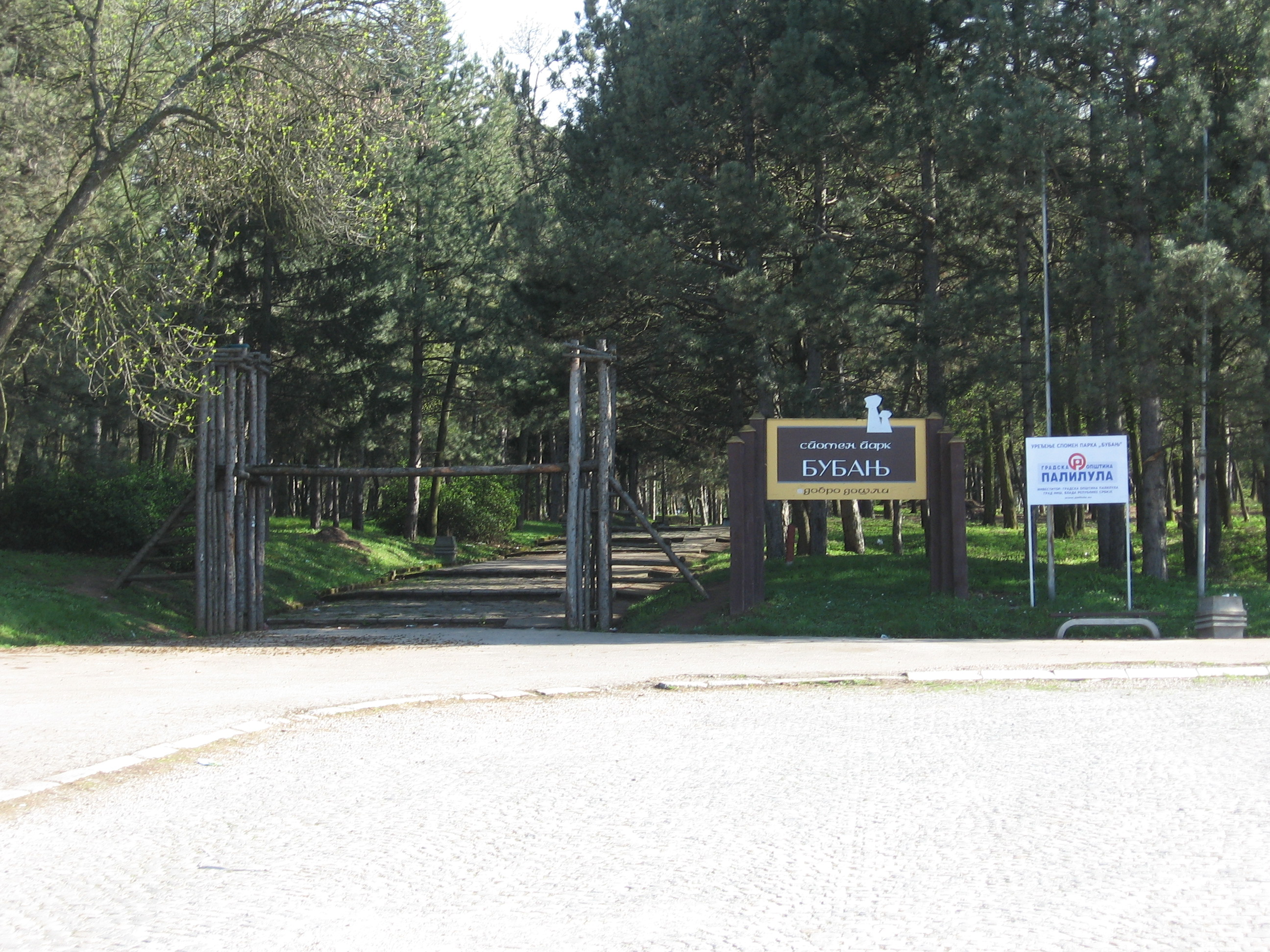
Entrance on Bubanj hill

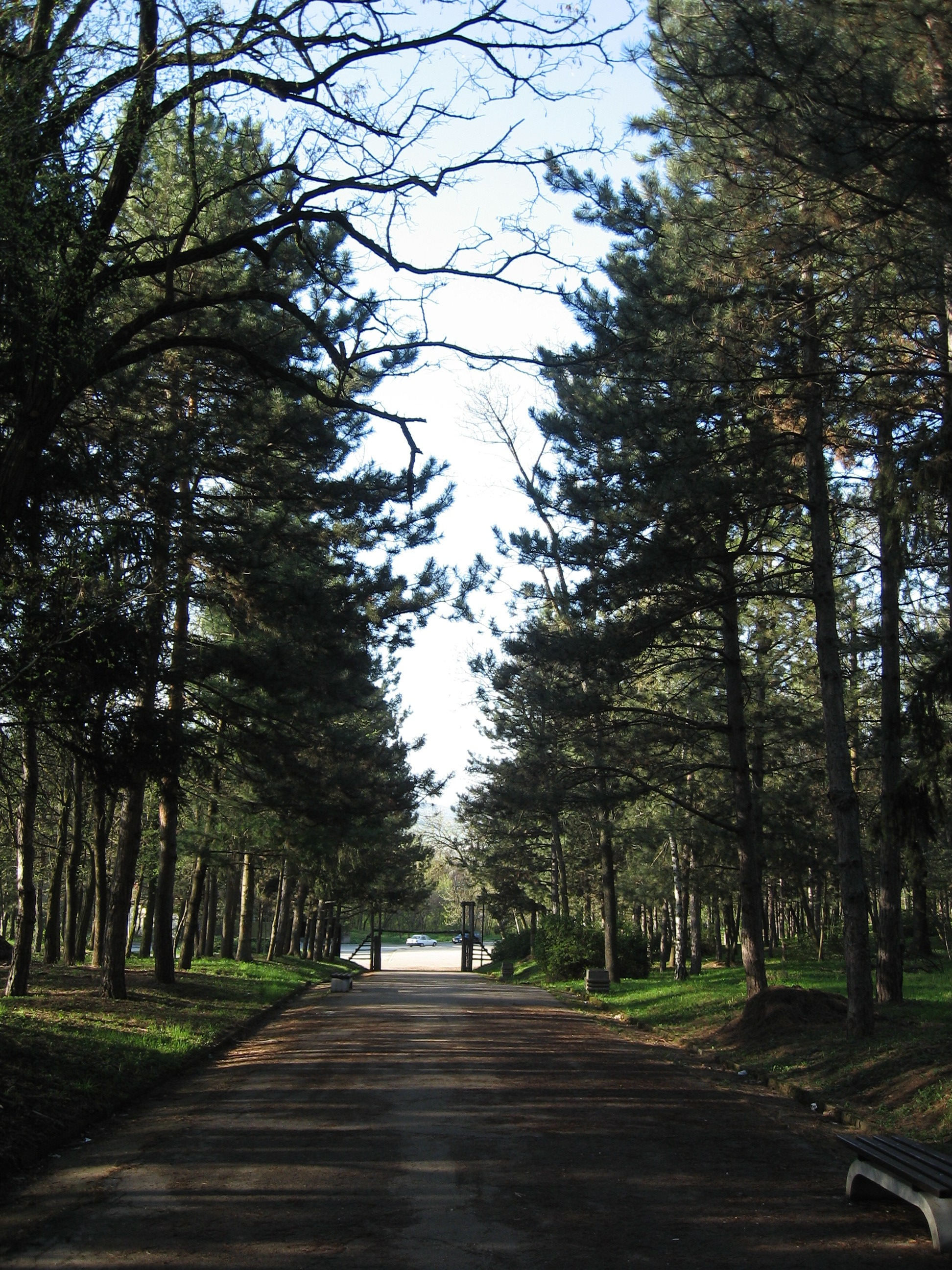
Path to the monument

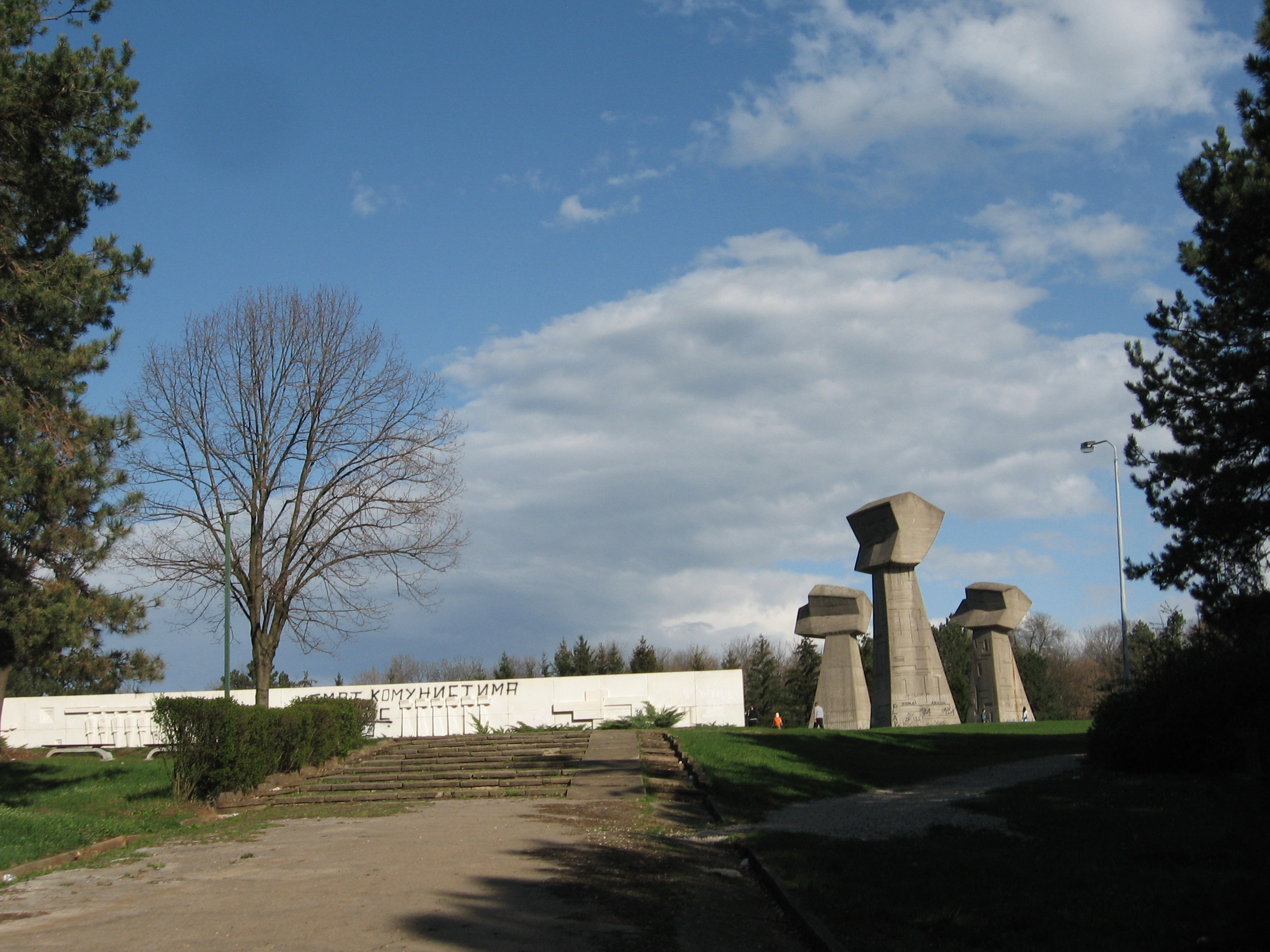
Overview of the memorial front view

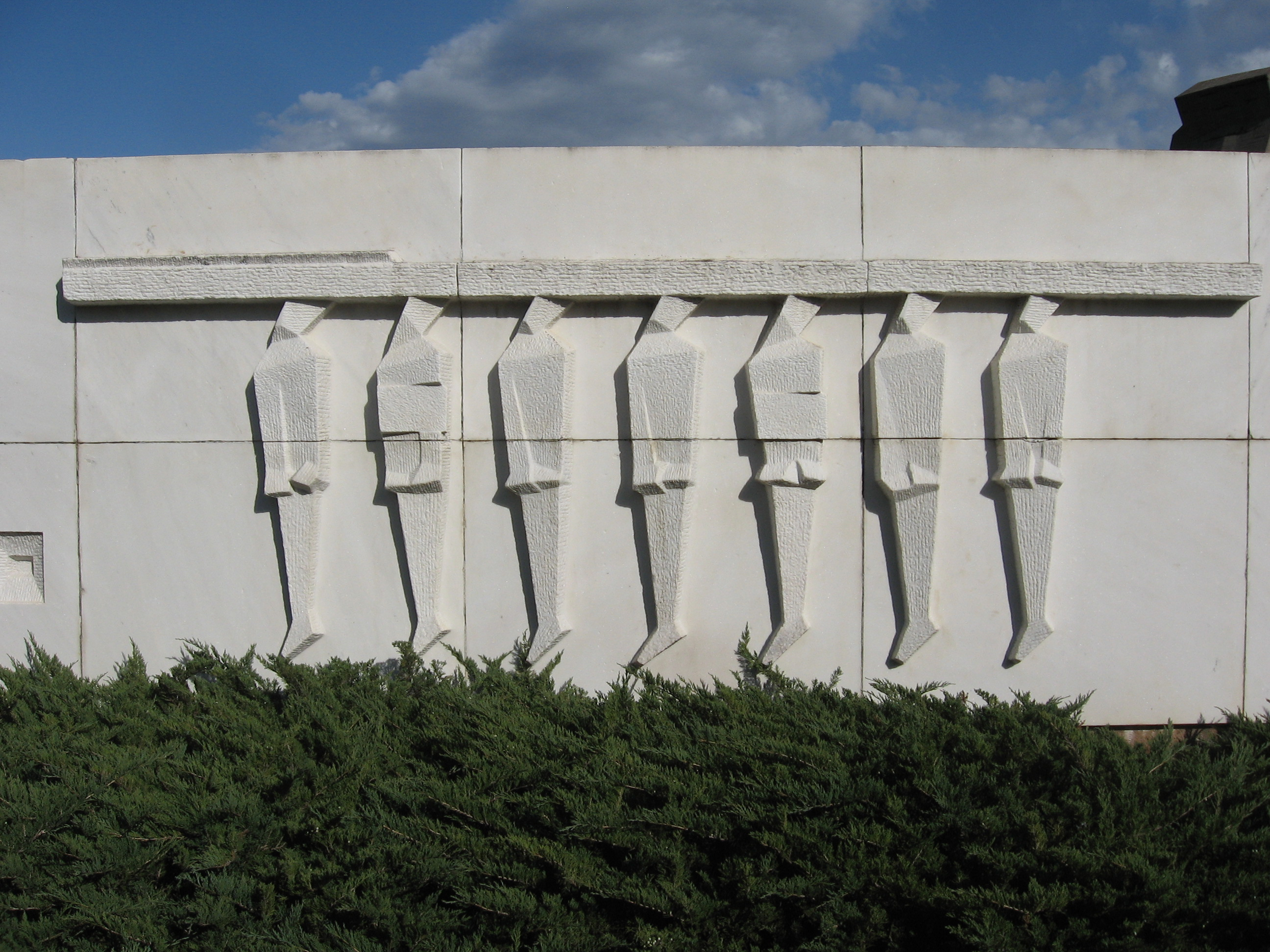
Death row

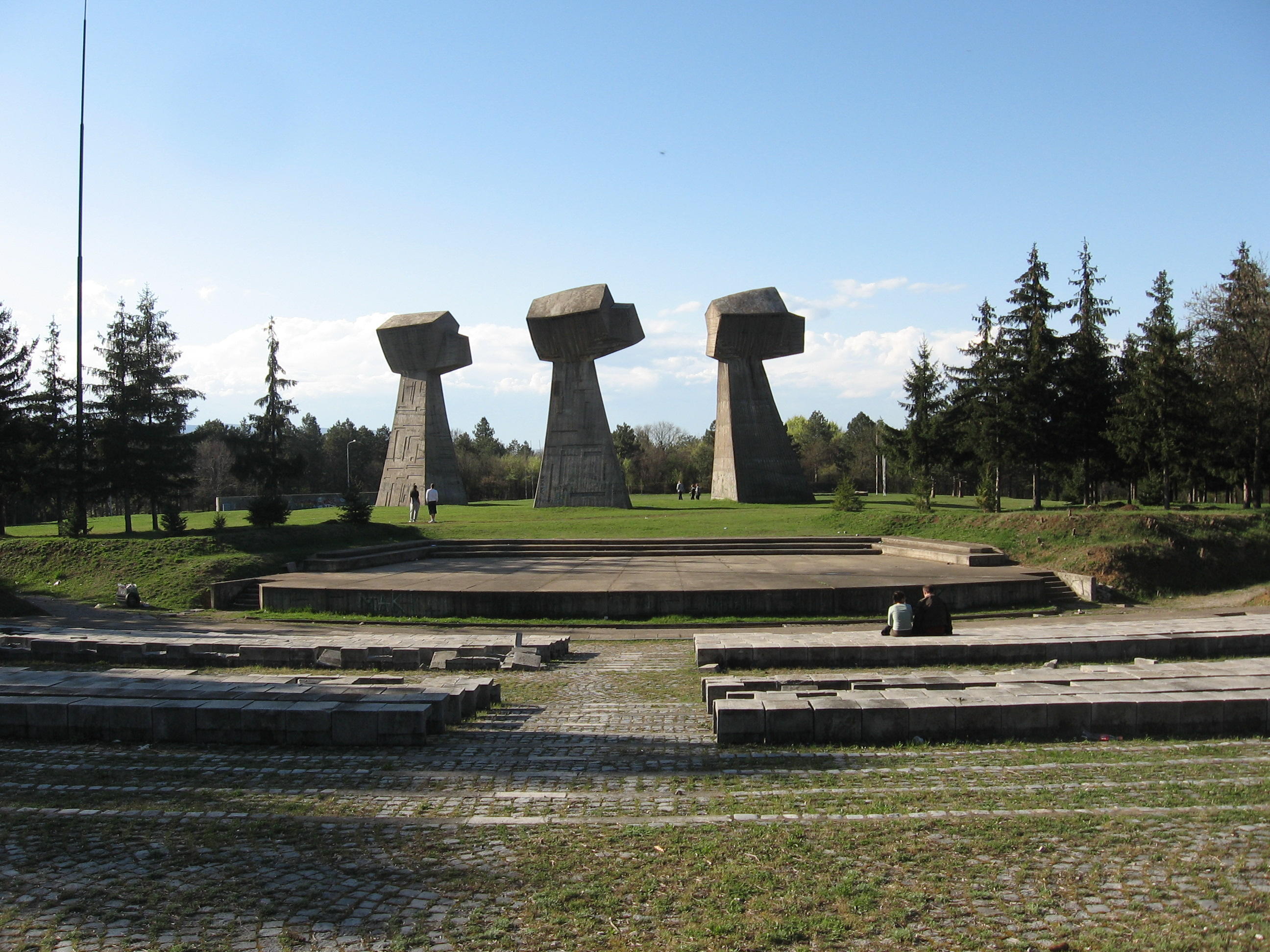
Summer stage

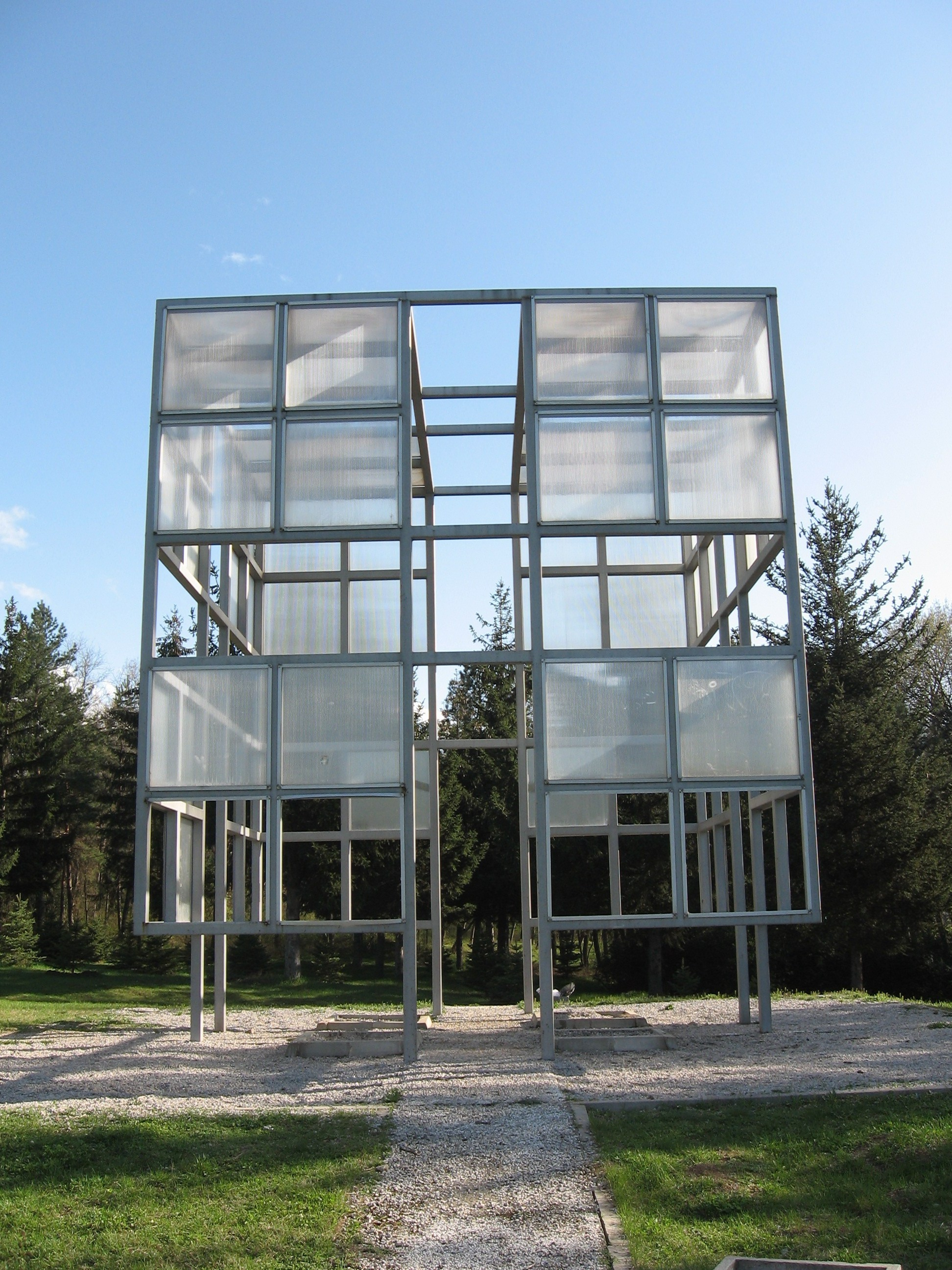
Bubanj Glass chapel

== See also ==
- Tourism in Serbia
- Historic Landmarks of Exceptional Importance
- List of Yugoslav World War II monuments and memorials in Serbia
