= Deveti Maj =

Coordinates: 43°19′N 21°48′E

Deveti Maj Девети Мај
- Village
- Interactive map of Deveti Maj
- Country: Serbia
- Region: Southern and Eastern Serbia
- District: Nišava
- City: Niš
- Municipality: Palilula
- Time zone: UTC+1 (CET)
  - Summer (DST): UTC+2 (CEST)

Deveti Maj (until the beginning of the 1990s, Novo Selo) is a populated place in the city municipality of Palilula in the area of the city of Niš, in the Nišava District. It is located on the alluvial terrace of South Morava and Nišava, about 6 km west of the center of Niš. According to the 2002 census, there were 4,305 inhabitants (according to the 1991 census, there were 3,689 inhabitants). According to the 2011 census, Deveti Maj has 4,795 inhabitants.

== History ==
Prehistoric findings (Neolithic) at the site called Bubanj indicate a very old population. No mention of Novi Selo is found in Turkish sources of the older period, which is why it can be assumed that it is of a younger origin, which is indicated by its name. In the Turkish census from 1498, however, the village of Donji Bubanj is mentioned with 41 houses and 5 mills, which then mysteriously disappeared (probably at the end of the 17th or in the first half of the 18th century). According to the Turkish census of the nahija of Niš from 1516, the place was one of 111 villages of the nahija and was called Donji Bubanj, and had 40 houses, 4 widowed households, 6 single households. Research at the Bubanj and KP Dom sites (graves, building material) showed that Donji Bubanj was probably located here. Today's settlement of Deveti Maj (Novo Selo) is a separate, younger village, out of continuity with Donji Bubanj and may have become a separate, transgressive hamlet of Popovac, and perhaps some special immigrant settlement. Liberation in 1878 found it as a village in the clearings on the left bank of Nišava with 11 homes and 85 inhabitants, ruled by Mustafa Bey from Niš.

Thanks to the good land and even more the proximity of Prokupačka road and Niš, Novo Selo began to attract settlers already in the interwar period. The settlement is oriented both towards the rural settlement and along the road. In 1921, Cvetan Stefanović, a blacksmith, originally from Aleksandrov, settled first along the Prokupac road, on its northern side. His one-story house and shop were bought in 1927 by Jovan Jović, a village carpenter, originally from Vranjska Banja. Two years later (1929) Milan Jović and his partner started working at the crossroads, on the site of today's supermarket. By demolishing its last remnant (chimney) and the primitive machinery next to it in 1946/47. In 1990, the "width" was created, where at the end of the eighth decade of the 20th century, self-service, a square and a market will be located. In 1930, the village had 41 households and 344 inhabitants. From 1930 to 1934, two mills were located along the road (both stopped working after 1945). Thanks to them, he got the space around the road in 1935/36. electricity, while the rural settlement got it in 1942/43. years. The successful start of the first settlers and a good business position on the road and at the crossroads attracted other newcomers, artisans, and by 1940 they had settled: 1 blacksmith (A. Mitrović from Bubnj), 1 wheelwright (B. Stošić) and 1 farrier ( D. Stošić), whose horseshoe shop St. Kostić from Lalinac converted it into a tavern in 1937.
