= Lalinac (Niš) =

Coordinates: 43.3419°N 21.7853°E

- Village
- Interactive map of Lalinac
- Country: Serbia
- Municipality: Niš
- Time zone: UTC+1 (CET)
  - Summer (DST): UTC+2 (CEST)

Lalinac is a village situated in the city municipality of Palilula in the Nisava district of the city Niš, Serbia. It is located on the alluvial terrace of South Morava and Nisava, And about 10 km west of the center of Nis. According to the 2002 census, there were 1828 inhabitants (according to the 1991 census there were 1,842 inhabitants). municipality in Serbia.

== History ==
Lalinac is old; in the Middle Ages a village was formed here, but the Turkish census from 1444, 1446, and 1498, mentioned it only as a mezgru, i.e. a place containing a deserted village which "stands out". Seven decades later (1564) Lalinac was restored and settled with over 30 homes. However, it is not known where the village settlement was, since two settlements are mentioned: one (more recent) on the right bank of the South Morava and others (older) on the left bank of the South Morava.

Oslobodjenje from the Turks found Lalinacin today's alluvial area of South Morava and Nisava with 67 houses and 560 inhabitants. Its position in a fertile plain and in the relative vicinity of Nis spurred its agricultural and herding development. At the end of the 19th century (1895), the village had 108 households and 811 inhabitants, and by 1930, this number grew to 184 households of 1,277 inhabitants.

The latest development period after 1944 encouraged crop-growing specialization. In this period, however, the tendencies of light emigration (primarily in Niš) appeared, followed by orientation towards a mixed economy with increased daily migration. At the same time, Lalinac became attractive to newcomers from remote and poorer villages, so that its total number of households and residents is growing, especially the number of households.

In 1971 in Lalinac there were 176 agricultural, 184 mixed and 57 non-agricultural households.
