= Palilula neighbourhood, Niš =

Neighborhood of the city of Niš, Serbia

Palilula (Serbian Cyrillic: Палилула, pronounced [pǎlilula]) is a neighborhood of the city of Niš, Serbia. It is located in Niš municipality of Palilula.

== Location ==
Palilula is located in the south-central part of Niš. It is partly flat and partly on hill bordered on the west by the neighborhood of Staro Groblje, on the south by neighborhood of Kovanluk, on the east by neighborhood of Apelovac, and on the north by neighborhoods of Marger.

== History ==
Palilula is one of the older neighborhoods of Niš. It was developed partly before and partly after 1878. Part of it was developed just after the construction of the railroad. During the Ottoman Empire the cities had been built very often by wooden beams, and there was a fire hazard. Therefore, during the Ottoman Empire, people were only allowed to smoke pipes out of the city walls. "Palilula" at that time was on the periphery, out of the city walls. The neighbourhood gives the name to the municipality of Palilula. The oldest part, located north of the railroad, became part of the municipality of Medijana, leaving the part southern of the railroad, which was developed after 1878, within the municipality of Palilula.

== Characteristics ==
The neighborhood is mostly residential. There is a St. Nikola Church, a City Music Club and a number of restaurants in the neighborhood.

== Future development ==
There is a plan of construction of new city boulevard by the railroad of Niš - Sofia.
