= Gornje Međurovo =

Coordinates: 43°16′38″N 21°50′49″E

- Village
- Interactive map of Gornje Međurovo
- Country: Serbia
- Municipality: Niš
- Time zone: UTC+1 (CET)
  - Summer (DST): UTC+2 (CEST)

Gornje Međurovo is a village situated in Niš municipality in Serbia.
