= Donje Vlase =

Coordinates: 43.2572°N 21.9117°E

- Village
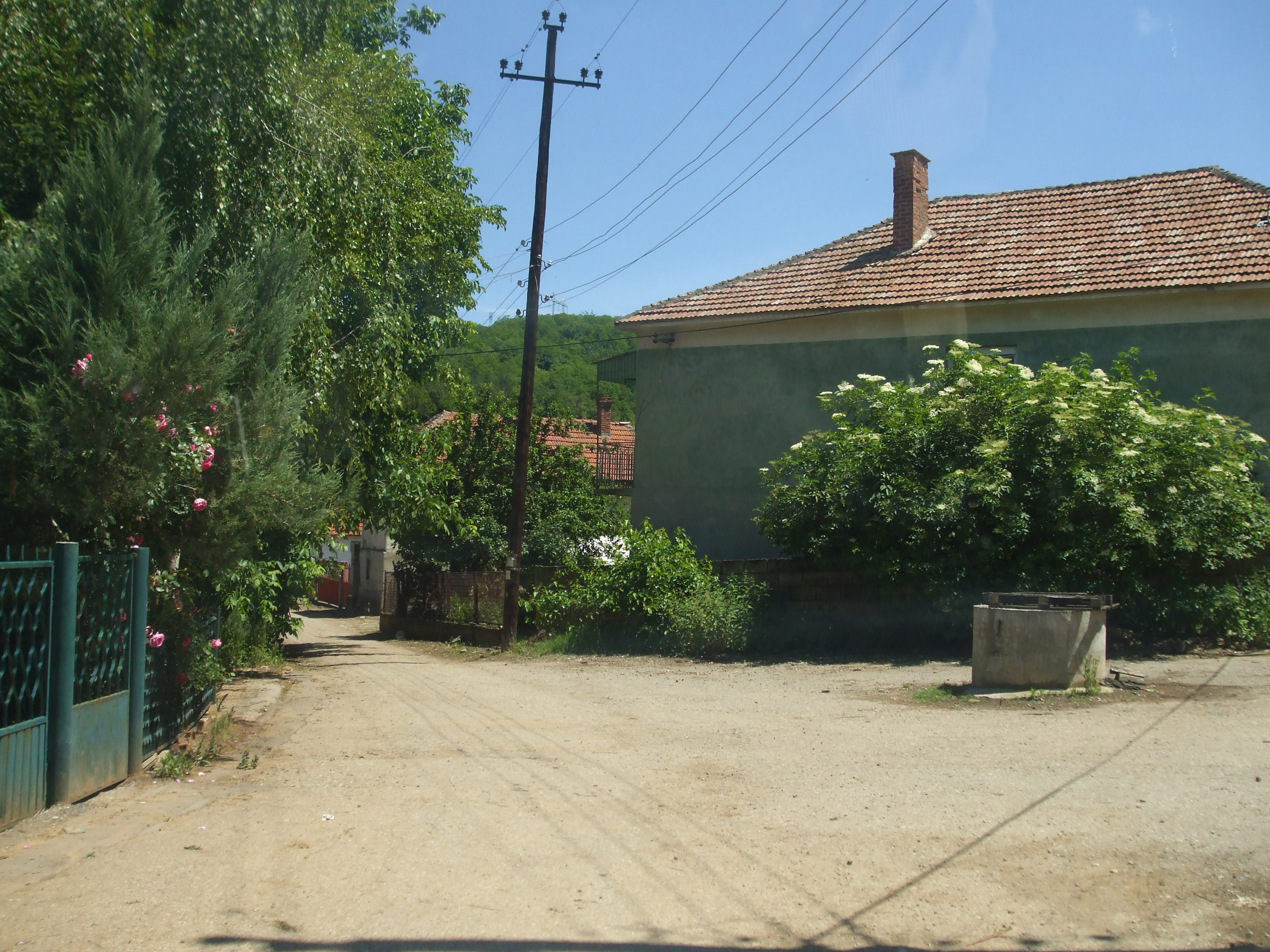
- Street of Donje Vlase
- Interactive map of Donje Vlase
- Country: Serbia
- District: Nišava
- Municipality: Niš
- Time zone: UTC+1 (CET)
  - Summer (DST): UTC+2 (CEST)

Donje Vlase is a village situated in Niš municipality in Serbia.
