= Berbatovo =

Coordinates: 43.2572°N 21.9431°E

- Village
- Interactive map of Berbatovo
- Country: Serbia
- Municipality: Niš
- Time zone: UTC+1 (CET)
  - Summer (DST): UTC+2 (CEST)

Berbatovo is an inhabited settlement in Palilula in Nis region in Nisava district. It is located on the southern edge of Nis valley, at the foot of the mountain SELIČEVICA, 10 km from the center of Nis. In 1878 had 45 households and 375 residents, and 1930 132 households and 687 inhabitants. According to the census of 2002, there were 364 people (according to the census of 1991, there were 367 inhabitants).

== History ==
The ancient traces in the village indicate the ancient population of this area. This is confirmed by the Turkish census from 1498, in which Berbatov has records: 24 home (8 single-person and one widow) and three water mills and with the advent of the village of 3835 shares. On the eve of the liberation from the Turks, the village is dominated by Ibrahim Bey. Berbarovo and its surroundings had a special role during the Second Serbian-Turkish war and the struggle for the liberation of Nis. At this point, from 26 to 31 December 1877 (by the Julian calendar), Sumadija Corps of the Serbian army were deployed under the command of General John Belimarkovića, which was a success in the battle against the Turks in positions south of Nis, especially in St. Mark streets and in Gorica, this gave an outstanding contribution to the final liberation of the city.

== Demographics ==
In the village Berbatovo live 324 adult inhabitants, and the average age is 49.3 years (48.1 for men and 50.5 for women). The village has 160 households, and the average number of occupants per household is 2.28.

This village is largely populated by Serbs (according to the 2002 census), and in the last three censuses, there was a decline in population. In the village Berbatovo live 324 adult inhabitants, and the average age is 49.3 years (48.1 for men and 50.5 for women). The village has 160 households, and the average number of members per household is 2.28.

This village is largely populated by Serbs (according to 2002 census), and in the last three censuses, noticed a decline in population.
