= Bubanj =

Bubanj Бубањ Bubanj Selo Бубањ Село
- Village
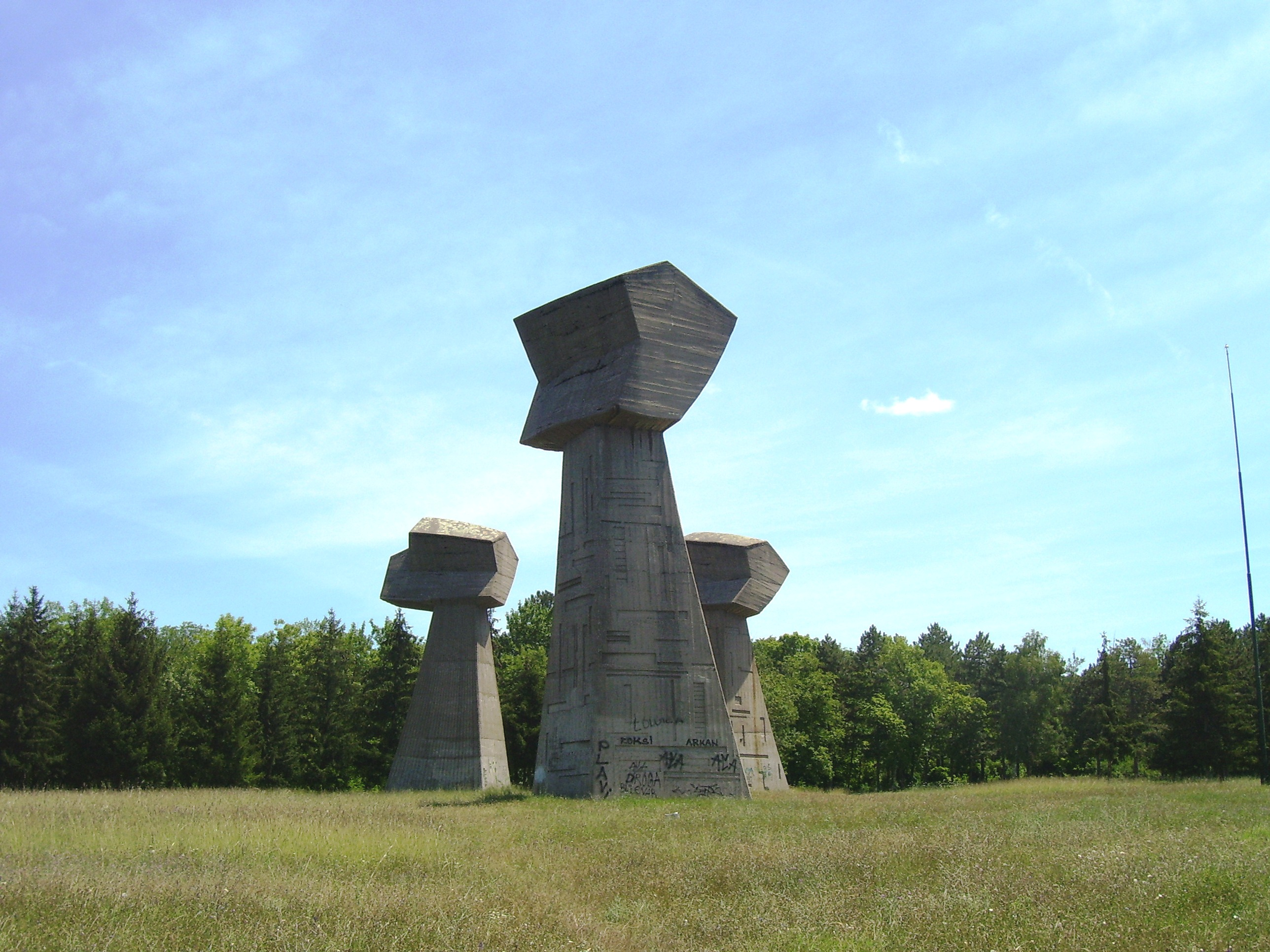
- Bubanj Memorial Park

- Location within Serbia
- Coordinates: 43°18′20″N 21°52′21″E
- Country: Serbia
- Region: Southern and Eastern Serbia
- District: Nišava
- City: Niš
- Municipality: Palilula

Population (2002)
  - Total: 516
- Time zone: UTC+1 (CET)
  - Summer (DST): UTC+2 (CEST)

Bubanj (Serbian Cyrillic: Бубањ; or as it is often called Bubanj Selo (Бубањ Село), because the city district of the city of Niš called Bubanj) is a village in the municipality of Palilula, City of Niš, Serbia. According to the 2002 census its population was 516 inhabitants (census 1991st was 441 inhabitants). It is famous for its World War II Bubanj Memorial Park, Historic Landmark of Exceptional Importance.

== History ==
Ceramics of Černa Voda III-culture dating to the Early and Middle Bronze Age have been found in Bubanj.

10,000 people from Niš and south Serbia were shot during World War II in Bubanj. In the memory of the dead a monument, in the shape of three monumental clenched fists, was memorialized in 1963. It is a work of sculptor Ivan Sabolić and symbolizes the resistance of the people during the World War II.

== Population ==
- 2002: 516
- 1991: 441

== See also ==
- Populated places of Serbia
- Bubanj Memorial Park
