= Vukmanovo =

Coordinates: 43°15′53″N 21°57′36″E

- Village
- Interactive map of Vukmanovo
- Country: Serbia
- District: Nišava District
- Municipality: Niš
- Time zone: UTC+1 (CET)
  - Summer (DST): UTC+2 (CEST)

Vukmanovo is a village situated in Niš municipality in Serbia.
