= Popovac (Niš) =

Popovac Поповац
- Village
- Location within Serbia
- Country: Serbia
- Region: Southern and Eastern Serbia
- District: Nišava
- City: Niš
- Municipality: Crveni Krst
- Time zone: UTC+1 (CET)
  - Summer (DST): UTC+2 (CEST)

Popovac is a village situated in Niš municipality in Serbia.

== History ==
Prehistoric finds on the edge of the old river bank terrace down the slopes of "Nad Ciganski Ključ" and "Selite" from the Neolithic period and Bronze Age show that Popovac belongs to very old villages. It also existed in the medieval Slavic period.

The Turkish census of 1444/46 finds it as a spahiluk (timar) of Çakirdžibaša Umur with 11 houses, 1 widow and with dues in the amount of 1,325 akči. It is also mentioned in the census of 1498 as a spahiluk (zeamet) of Ibrahim-bey from Niš with 30 houses, 17 single houses, 5 widow houses and with dues in the amount of 4,644 akči. According to the Turkish census of the Niš nahija from 1516, the place was one of 111 villages in the nahija and bore the same name as today, and had 20 houses, 1 widow's household, 4 single households.[1] The old-timers in Popovac believe that a stronger flow of immigrants from the upper Ponišavlje settled in the village "during Turkish times", after whom some families still bear the name "Piroćanci". The liberation of 1878 found Popovac as a fairly developed village with about 70 houses. Its location on a fertile plain, near Niš, provided conditions for the development of advanced and market-oriented agriculture, but the proximity of the city also encouraged the process of transformation into non-agricultural occupations, as well as the emergence of immigration.

This second tendency was already felt in the period between the two world wars, and took on an intensive form after the Second World War. The growth of non-agricultural occupations and the strengthening of daily migration both towards Niš and towards Popovac contributed to the establishment of a marshalling yard in the village. The connecting branch of the north-south railway line through Popovac was built by the Austro-Germans in 1917, and the railway station with three tracks by the Germans in 1942. During 1965 to 1975, a large marshalling yard was built for the formation and disinfection of trains with 39 tracks. From 17 railway employees in 1946, this number increased to 222 in 1972. At the same time, in the railway station sector and along the railway line, where there were 5 houses in 1965, new larger settlements developed, "Železnička kolonija" and "Donja pruga" with about a hundred houses (1979). In addition to the significant restructuring of the indigenous population towards non-agricultural occupations, there was a parallel influx and settlement of the population (factory workers, railway workers, airport workers, bricklayers) from other regions. In 1971, there were 41 agricultural, 69 mixed and 409 non-agricultural households living in Popovac.

The Budućnost Popovac football club is located here.
