= Republic of Serbia (1992–2006) =

Constituent state of the FR Yugoslavia, then Serbia and Montenegro

Republic of Serbia Република Србија Republika Srbija
- 1992–2006
- Flag; Top: 1992–2004; Bottom: 2004–2006 Coat of arms Top: 1992–2004; Bottom: 2004–2006
- Anthem: Хеј, Словени; Hej, Sloveni "Hey, Slavs" (1992–2004) Боже правде Bože pravde "God of Justice" (2004–2006)
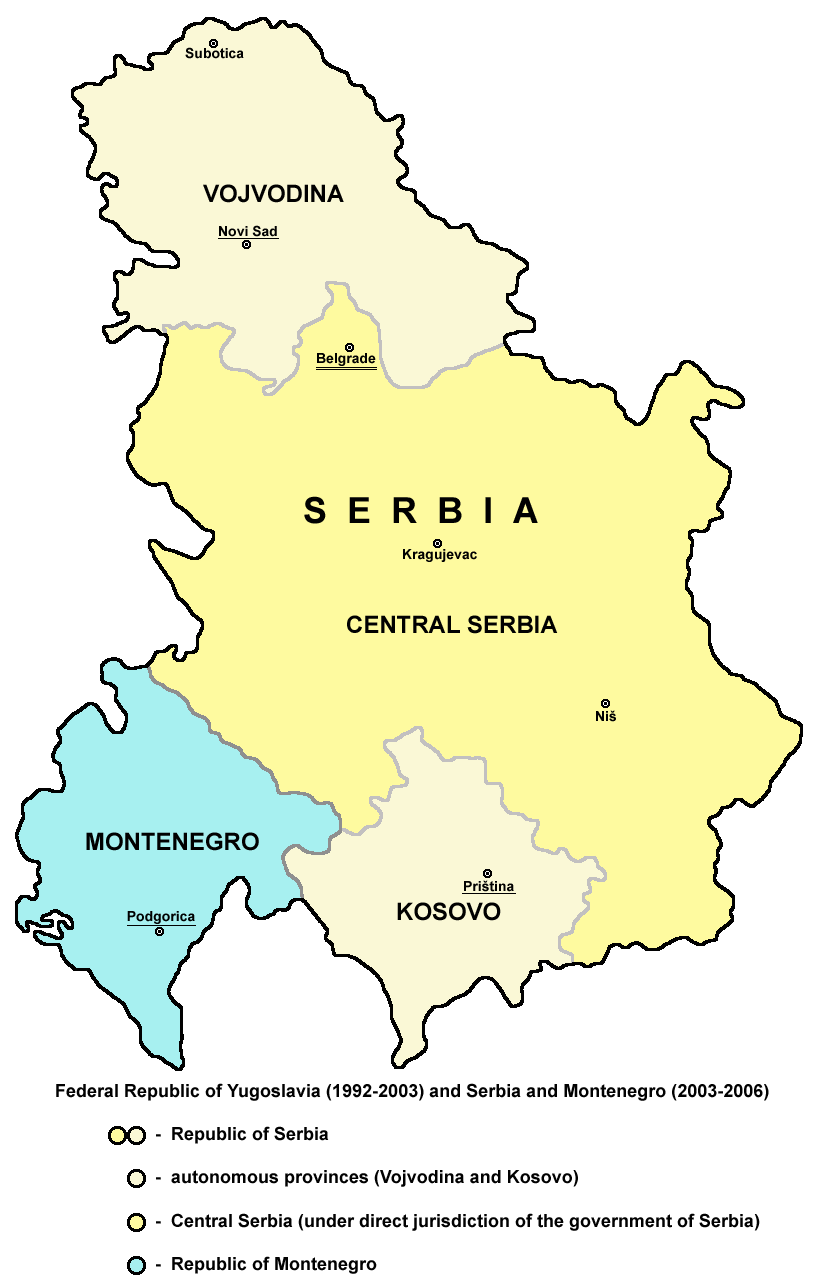
- Subdivisions of Serbia and Montenegro: Serbia; Autonomous provinces of Serbia; Montenegro
- Status: Constituent state of Serbia and Montenegro
- Capital: Belgrade
- Official languages: Serbo-Croatian
- Government: Parliamentary republic
- President
  - 1992–1997: Slobodan Milošević
  - 1997–2002: Milan Milutinović
  - 2002–2004: Nataša Mićić (acting)
  - 2004–2006: Boris Tadić
- Prime Minister
  - 1992–1993 (first): Radoman Božović
  - 2004–2006 (last): Vojislav Koštunica
- Legislature: National Assembly
- Historical era: Yugoslav Wars
  - Adoption of the Constitution: 28 September 1990
  - Federal Republic of Yugoslavia: 27 April 1992
  - State Union of Serbia and Montenegro: 4 February 2003
  - Dissolution of the State Union of Serbia and Montenegro: 5 June 2006

Area
  - Total: 88,361 km^{2} (34,116 sq mi)
- 2006: 88,361 km^{2} (34,116 sq mi)
- Currency: Yugoslav dinar (from 2003 Serbian dinar)
- ISO 3166 code: RS
Preceded by	Succeeded by
Socialist Republic of Serbia	1999: United Nations Interim Administration Mission in Kosovo; 2006: Republic of Serbia
- Today part of: Serbia; Kosovo^{[a]}
- 1. The political status of Kosovo is disputed.

The Republic of Serbia (Serbo-Croatian: Република Србија / Republika Srbija) was a constituent state of the Federal Republic of Yugoslavia between 1992 and 2003 and the State Union of Serbia and Montenegro from 2003 to 2006. With Montenegro's secession from the union with Serbia in June 2006, both became sovereign states in their own right for the first time in nearly 88 years.

After the League of Communists of Yugoslavia collapsed in 1990, the Socialist Republic of Serbia led by Slobodan Milošević's Socialist Party (formerly the Communists) adopted a new constitution, declaring itself a constituent republic with democratic institutions within Yugoslavia, and the "Socialist" adjective was dropped from the official title. As Yugoslavia broke up, in 1992 Serbia and Montenegro formed a new federative state called the Federal Republic of Yugoslavia, known after 2003 as simply Serbia and Montenegro.

Serbia was not officially involved in the Bosnian or Croatian wars. However, the Serb rebel entities both sought direct unification with Serbia. SAO Krajina and later the Republic of Serbian Krajina sought to become "a constitutive part of the unified state territory of the Republic of Serbia". The Republika Srpska's political leader Radovan Karadžić declared that he did not want it to be in a federation alongside Serbia in Yugoslavia, but that Srpska should be directly incorporated into Serbia. While Serbia acknowledged both entities' desire to be in a common state with Serbia, both entities chose the path of individual independence and so the Serbian government did not recognize them as part of Serbia, or within the Federal Republic of Yugoslavia.

Although Serbia kept nominally out of the Yugoslav wars until 1998 when the Kosovo War broke out, the 1990s were marked by an economic crisis and hyperinflation, the Yugolav wars, a refugee crisis, and the authoritarian rule of Slobodan Milošević. After the opposition came to power in 2000, Serbia (viewed in the international community differently from Montenegro whose leadership was in good terms with the West since 1998) began its transition in reconciliation with western nations, a decade later than most other east European countries. As a result of this change, Yugoslavia began to slowly re-integrate itself internationally following a period of isolation caused by sanctions that were now gently easing.

== Background ==
With the collapse of the Socialist Federal Republic of Yugoslavia (SFRY) in 1992, the two remaining constituent republics of Serbia and Montenegro agreed to form a new Yugoslav state which officially abandoned communism in favor of forming a new Yugoslavia based upon democratic institutions (although the republic retained its communist coat of arms). This new rump Yugoslavia was known as the Federal Republic of Yugoslavia (FRY). The Socialist Republic of Serbia became known as the Republic of Serbia in 1990 after the League of Communists of Yugoslavia collapsed, though former Communist politicians would exercise influence for the first ten years, as the ruling Socialist Party of Serbia was directly descended from the League of Communists of Serbia. Serbia appeared to be the dominant republic in the FRY given the vast size and population differences between the republics; internally, however, the two entities functioned independently while with regard to foreign affairs, the federal government had comprised Montenegrins as well as Serbians.

== History ==
=== Federation ===
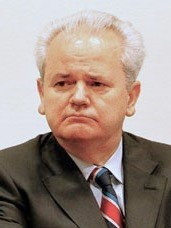
Slobodan Milošević, President of Serbia from 1989 to 1997 and President of Yugoslavia from 1997 to 2000.

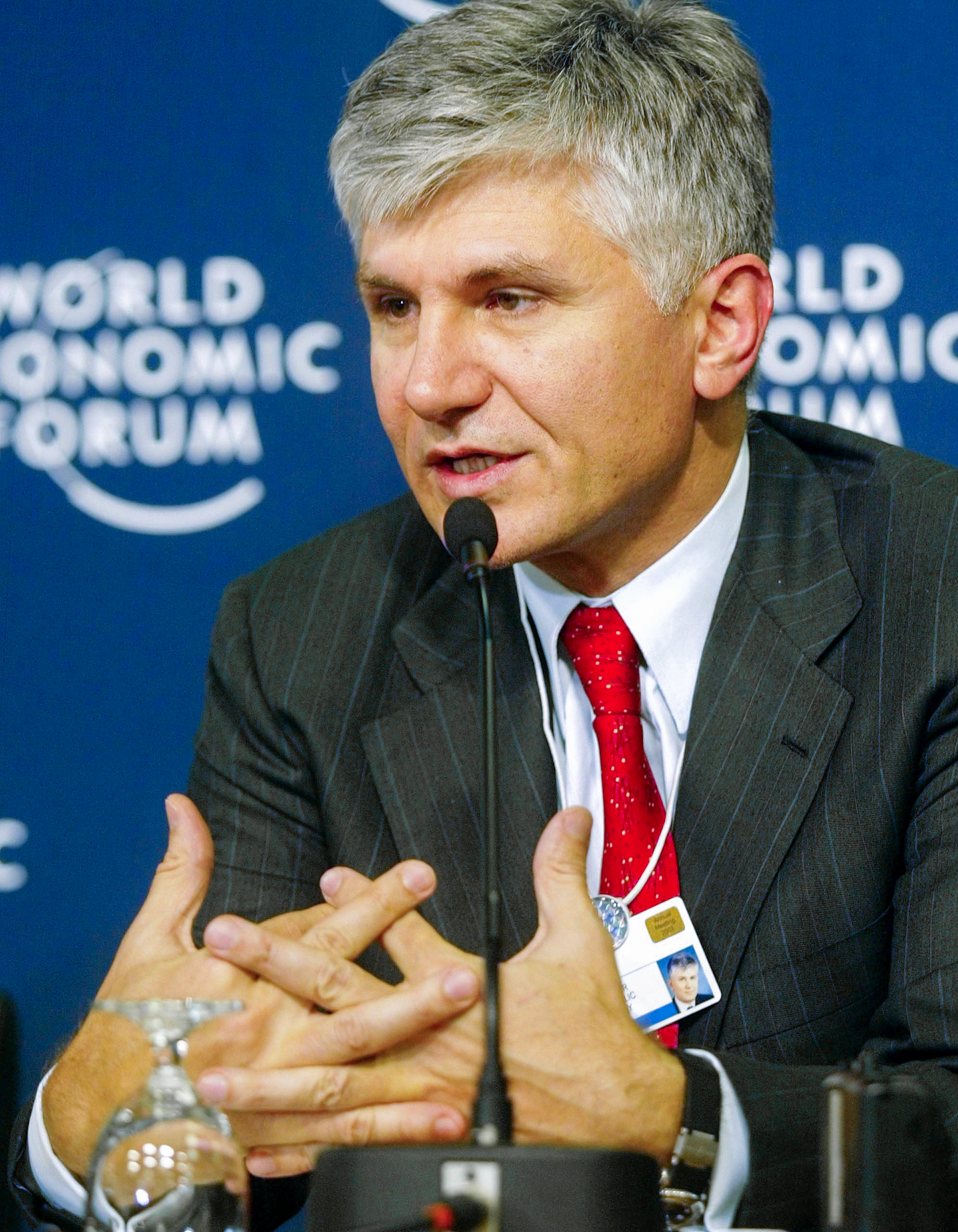
Zoran Đinđić, Prime Minister of Serbia from 2001 to 2003.

The politics of Serbia in the FRY continued to support Serbian interests in Bosnia and Herzegovina and Croatia whose Serb populations wanted to remain in Yugoslavia. Since 1989, Serbia had been led by Slobodan Milošević, a former Communist who promised to defend and promote Serb interests in Yugoslavia. In 1992, he and Montenegrin President Momir Bulatović formed the Federal Republic of Yugoslavia. Many critics on the international stage saw Serbia as the dominant internal unit of the FRY, in which Serbian President Milošević seemed to have more influence on federal politics than the Yugoslav President (the first federal president, Dobrica Ćosić was forced to resign for opposing Milošević). The Milosevic government did not have official territorial claims on the Republic of Macedonia. Others have claimed that Milosevic only advocated self-determination of self-proclaimed Serbs who wished to remain in Yugoslavia.

During the Yugoslav Wars in Croatia and Bosnia & Herzegovina, Milošević supported Serb separatists who wished to secede from these newly created states. This support extended to controversial figures such as Bosnian Serb leader Radovan Karadžić, and accusations by some international figures claimed that Milošević was in charge of the Serb factions during the war and had authorized war atrocities to occur.

In 1995, Milošević represented the Bosnian Serbs during the signing of the Dayton Peace Agreement. Milošević continued to be President of Serbia until 1997 when he retired as Serbian President and became Yugoslav President. Milan Milutinović took over as Serbian President from Milošević that year.

From 1996 to 1999, severe political instability erupted in the Albanian-populated province of Kosovo in Serbia. This caused the Kosovo War from 1998 until 1999. During the Kosovo War, Serbia and Montenegro were bombed by NATO aircraft which included the Serbian and federal capital of Belgrade. Afterward, Belgrade agreed to relinquish control of the province of Kosovo to a United Nations autonomous mandate. On April 12, 1999, the Federal Assembly of the FR Yugoslavia passed the "Decision on the accession of the FRY to the Union state of Russia and Belarus". The legal successor of that decision is the Republic of Serbia.

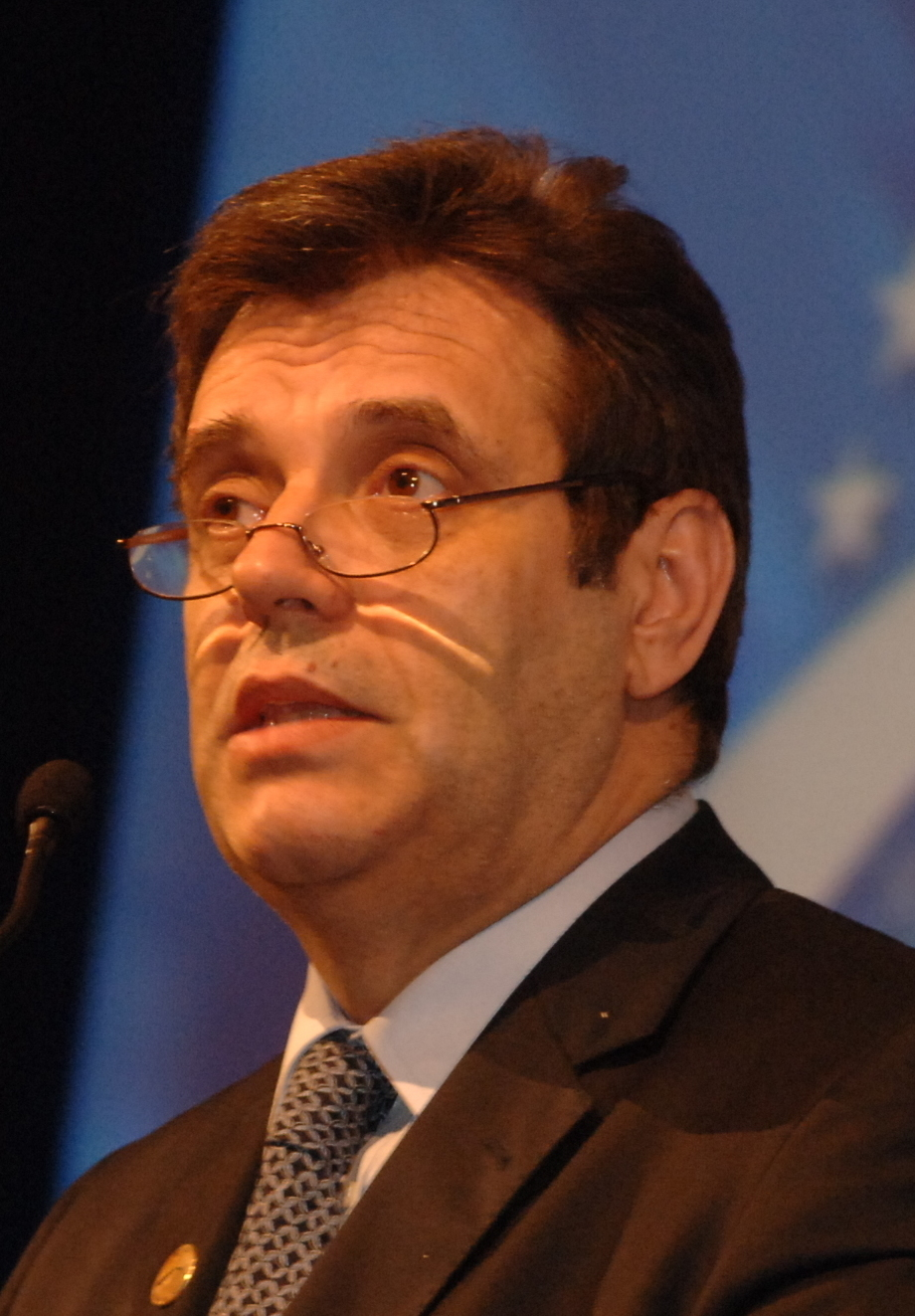
Vojislav Koštunica, President of Yugoslavia from 2000 to 2003 and Prime Minister of Serbia from 2004 to 2006

The Yugoslav Wars resulted in a failing economy in Serbia due to sanctions, hyperinflation, and anger at the federal presidency of Milošević. The wars and their aftermath saw the rise of Serbian ultranationalist parties, such as the Serbian Radical Party led by Vojislav Šešelj, who in his rhetoric, promoted the idea of Serbs continuing to live in a single state. Šešelj participated in the ethnic Serbian campaign against Croats and Bosniaks during the Yugoslav Wars. Šešelj was twice arrested in 1994 and 1995 by the Yugoslav government, but eventually became Vice-President of Serbia from 1998 to 2000. In 2000, Serbian citizens protested against elections when Milošević refused to stand down from the Yugoslav Presidency following elections as allegations of voter fraud existed. Milošević was ousted on 5 October 2000, and officially resigned the following day. He was later arrested in 2001 by federal authorities for alleged corruption whilst in power but was soon transferred to The Hague to face war crimes charges.

After the overthrow of Milošević, Vojislav Koštunica became the President of Yugoslavia. In 2002, Milošević's ally, Serbian President Milutinović resigned, thus ending twelve years of some form of the political leadership of the Socialist Party of Serbia over the republic. Boris Tadić of the Democratic Party replaced Milutinović.

=== Confederation ===
In 2003, following the new confederation, Serbia became one of the constituent states within it along with Montenegro. The confederacy arose as Montenegrin nationalism was growing. Montenegro had for some years used external currency as legal tender, this began with the German Mark, and since 2002, became the Euro. Serbia, however continued to use the Yugoslav Dinar, and the national bank of Yugoslavia. Serbia's attachment to the confederation would be its final subordination until its independence was declared in 2006 following Montenegro's declaration of independence from the confederation following a referendum on independence shortly prior.

Between 2003 and 2006, Serbia was faced with internal political strife over the direction of the republic, Serbian politicians were divided over the decision to create the loose state union in the first place. Zoran Đinđić who was seen as a major proponent of the state union was criticized by the former Yugoslav President Vojislav Koštunica. The anger of nationalists over Đinđić's positions resulted in a sudden assassination in March 2003 which caused a state of emergency to be declared. In 2004, pro-European Union political forces united against nationalist forces who opposed Serbia's entry into the EU until the EU recognized Serbia's sovereignty in Kosovo.

On 21 May 2006, Serbia faced the implications of a referendum on independence from the state union by Montenegro. Most Serbians wished to keep Montenegro in a state union due to the previous close ties which the two nations had and that Montenegrins were considered in Serbia to be the same as Serbs culturally and ethnically. Despite a hard-fought campaign by pro-unionists, pro-independence forces narrowly won the referendum with just over 55% threshold demanded by the European Union. The Assembly of the Republic of Montenegro made a formal Declaration of Independence on Saturday 3 June.

With Montenegro's independence granted, Serbia declared itself the legal and political successor of Serbia and Montenegro, the first time it had been so since 1918 and that the government and parliament of Serbia itself would soon adopt a new constitution. This also ended an almost 88-year union between Montenegro and Serbia.

== Economy ==
Throughout most of the 1990s and early-2000s, sanctions were held against Serbia. The sanctions against Serbia and Montenegro started to be withdrawn after the overthrow of Milošević and most were lifted by 19 January 2001.

== Government ==
=== Presidents ===
- Slobodan Milošević (11 January 1991 – 23 July 1997)
- Dragan Tomić (23 July 1997 – 29 December 1997) (acting)
- Milan Milutinović (29 December 1997 – 29 December 2002)
- Nataša Mićić (29 December 2002 – 27 January 2004) (acting)
- Dragan Maršićanin (4 February 2004 – 3 March 2004) (acting)
- Vojislav Mihailović (3 March 2004 – 4 March 2004) (acting)
- Predrag Marković (4 March 2004 – 11 July 2004) (acting)
- Boris Tadić (11 July 2004 – 5 June 2006)

=== Prime Ministers ===
- Radoman Božović (27 April 1992 – 10 February 1993)
- Nikola Šainović (10 February 1993 – 18 March 1994)
- Mirko Marjanović (18 March 1994 – 24 October 2000)
- Milomir Minić (25 October 2000 – 25 January 2001)
- Zoran Đinđić (25 January 2001 – 12 March 2003)
- Nebojša Čović (12 March 2003 – 18 March 2003) (acting)
- Žarko Korać (17 March 2003 – 18 March 2003) (acting)
- Zoran Živković (18 March 2003 – 4 March 2004)
- Vojislav Koštunica (4 March 2004 – 5 June 2006)

== See also ==
- History of Serbia

== Sources ==
- Bataković, Dušan T., ed. (2005). Histoire du peuple serbe [History of the Serbian People] (in French). Lausanne: L’Age d’Homme. ISBN 9782825119587.
- Jovanovic, Predrag; Sukovic, Danilo (2001). "A decade under sanctions". Transparentnost. Archived from the original on 2022-12-27.
- Miller, Nicholas (2005). "Serbia and Montenegro". Eastern Europe: An Introduction to the People, Lands, and Culture. Vol. 3. Santa Barbara, California: ABC-CLIO. pp. 529–581. ISBN 9781576078006.
- The Mandala Projects (2012). "Serbia Sanctions (SERBSANC)". The Mandala Projects. 391. Archived from the original on 2015-05-12.
