= Cabinet of Serbia (2001–2004) =

Government of Serbia under Zoran Đinđić

Cabinet of Zoran Đinđić Cabinet of Zoran Živković
- 7th & 8th Cabinet of Republic of Serbia
- 2001 – 2004
- Date formed: 25 January 2001, 18 March 2003
- Date dissolved: 18 March 2003, 3 March 2004

People and organisations
- Head of state: Milan Milutinović; Nataša Mićić (acting); Dragan Maršićanin (acting)
- Head of government: Zoran Đinđić (2001–03); Nebojša Čović (acting); Žarko Korać (acting); Zoran Živković (2003–04)
- Member parties: Democratic Opposition of Serbia
- Status in legislature: Minority government

History
- Election: 23 December 2000
- Predecessor: Cabinet of Milomir Minić
- Successor: Cabinet of Vojislav Koštunica I

The Government of Serbia under Zoran Đinđić as the prime minister was formed on 25 January 2001. It is the first post-Milošević government formed after Serbian parliamentary elections held on 23 December 2000, when the Democratic Opposition of Serbia coalition (DOS) won 64.09% of the popular vote translating into 176 seats in the Serbian National Assembly (out of 250 seats).

Zoran Đinđić, the leader of the Democratic Party, was designated as prime minister and given the task of forming Serbia's first freely elected post-communist and post-Milošević Government. The Government was sworn in on 25 January 2001 and its term officially ended on March 3, 2004, when the new government under PM Vojislav Koštunica was unveiled following the 2003 Serbian parliamentary election held in late December.

When PM Zoran Đinđić was assassinated on March 12, 2003, Nebojša Čović (one of the five deputy PMs at the time) became the acting PM for four days until Zoran Živković got named as the new prime minister on March 16, 2003.

After Đinđić's assassination, the government also went through a slight reconfiguration as Čedomir Jovanović, up to that point DOS' parliamentary club chief, became deputy PM.

== Composition ==
Position	Portfolio	Name	Image	Party
Prime Minister	General Affairs	Zoran Đinđić (2001–03)		DS
Prime Minister	General Affairs	Nebojša Čović (acting) (2003)		DA
Prime Minister	General Affairs	Žarko Korać (acting) (2003)		SDU
Prime Minister	General Affairs	Zoran Živković (2003–04)		DS
Deputy Prime Minister	Internal Affairs	Dušan Mihajlović		ND
Deputy Prime Minister	General Affairs	Nebojša Čović		DA
Deputy Prime Minister	General Affairs	Žarko Korać		SDU
Deputy Prime Minister	General Affairs	József Kasza		SVM
Deputy Prime Minister	General Affairs	Momčilo Perišić (2001–02)		PDS
Deputy Prime Minister	General Affairs	Aleksandar Pravdić (2001)		DSS
Deputy Prime Minister	General Affairs	Miodrag Isakov (2002–04)		RV
Deputy Prime Minister	General Affairs	Vuk Obradović (2001)		SD
Deputy Prime Minister	General Affairs	Čedomir Jovanović (2003–04)		DS
Minister	Finance	Božidar Đelić		DS
Minister	Agriculture, Forestry and Water Management	Dragan Veselinov (2001–03)		NSS
Minister	Agriculture, Forestry and Water Management	Stojan Jevtić (2003–04)		DS
Minister	Justice	Vladan Batić		DHSS
Minister	Labour and Employment	Dragan Milovanović		LPS (2002–2004)
Minister	Social Affairs	Gordana Matković		DS
Minister	Health (and Environmental Protection)	Obren Joksimović (2001)		DSS
Minister	Health (and Environmental Protection)	Tomica Milosavljević (2002–03)		G17+
Minister	Transport and Telecommunications	Marija Rašeta Vukosavljević		DS
Minister	International Economic Relations	Goran Pitić		DS
Minister	Culture and Media	Branislav Lečić		DS
Minister	Mining and Energy	Goran Novaković (2001–02)		Ind.
Minister	Mining and Energy	Kori Udovički (2002–03)		Ind.
Minister	Education and Sport	Gašo Knežević		GSS
Minister	Trade, Tourism and Services	Slobodan Milosavljević		DS
Minister	Religion	Vojislav Milovanović		Ind.
Minister	Economy and Privatisation	Aleksandar Vlahović		DS
Minister	Construction and Urban Planning	Dragoslav Šumarac		DS
Minister	Science, Technology and Development	Dragan Domazet		DS
Minister	Public Administration and Local Self-Government	Rodoljub Šabić (2002–03)		SD
Minister	Natural Resources and Environmental Protection	Anđelka Mihajlov (2002–04)		DS

=== Deputy Ministers ===
The Deputy Ministers in the Serbian Government appointed in February 2001 were:

- Mirko Cvetković, Deputy Minister of Economy and Privatisation (appointed Prime Minister of Serbia in July 2008)
- Dejan Popović, Deputy Minister of Finance
- Dragan Marković, Deputy Minister of Agriculture, Forestry and Water Management
- Đurđe Ninković, Deputy Minister of Justice
- Dimitrije Vukčević, Deputy Minister of Energy and Mining
- Zoran Radivojević, Deputy Minister of Transport and Telecommunications
- Radojko Obradović, Deputy Minister of Construction and Urban Planning
- Ferenc Mokanj, Deputy Minister of Trade, Tourism and Services
- Dobrosav Milovanović, Deputy Minister of International Economic Relations
- Dušan Protić, Deputy Minister of Public Administration and Local Self-Government
- Nebojša Miletić, Deputy Minister of Labour and Employment
- Liljana Lučić, Deputy Minister for Social Affairs
- Radojica Pešić, Deputy Minister for Science, Technology and Development
- Vigor Majić, Deputy Minister of Education and Sport
- Uroš Jovanović, Deputy Minister of Health and Environmental Protection, 2001-02
- Dragan Celiković, Deputy Minister of Health
- Živojin Stjepić, Deputy Minister of Religion

(The post of Deputy Minister has since 2004 been abolished and a new post of State Secretary (državni sekretar) has been instituted (of which there are several in each Ministry).

== See also ==
- Cabinet of Serbia (2000–01)
- Cabinet of Serbia (2004–2007)
- Cabinet of Serbia (2007–08)
- Cabinet of Serbia (2008–2012)
- Cabinet of Serbia (2012–2014)
- Cabinet of Serbia
