= First cabinet of Vojislav Koštunica =

First Cabinet of Vojislav Koštunica
- 9th Cabinet of Republic of Serbia
- 2004–2007
- Date formed: 3 March 2004
- Date dissolved: 15 May 2007

People and organisations
- Head of state: Boris Tadić
- Head of government: Vojislav Koštunica
- Member parties: DSS; G17 Plus; New Serbia; SPO; SDP
- Status in legislature: Minority government

History
- Election: December 28, 2003
- Predecessor: Cabinet of Zoran Živković
- Successor: Cabinet of Vojislav Koštunica II

The Government of Serbia under Vojislav Koštunica as the Prime Minister was formed on March 3, 2004. After 2007 Serbian parliamentary election on 21 January, this cabinet served as a transitional government handling only technical issues until the new government was finally formed in May 2007.

This government of Serbia consisted of four political parties - DSS (10 portfolios), G-17 Plus (4 portfolios), SPO & NS (7 portfolios and their subsidiary parties) with parliamentary support of the SPS.

On March 6, Serbian Prime Minister Vojislav Koštunica appointed a close aide, Rade Bulatović, as his new secret service chief despite Bulatović arrest as a suspect in the assassination of the former prime minister.

During Koštunica's administration, most of the 24 disputed privatizations took place, for which there are serious suspicions that there were large-scale embezzlements. Large number of privatizations were later annulled due to non-fulfillment of privatization contracts or those companies went bankrupt.

== Composition ==
Position	Portfolio	Name	Image	Party
Prime Minister		Vojislav Koštunica		DSS
Deputy Prime Minister		Miroljub Labus (2004–2006)		G17+
Deputy Prime Minister		Ivana Dulić-Marković (2006)		G17+
Secretary-General		Dejan Mihajlov		DSS
Minister	Foreign Affairs	Vuk Drašković (2006–2007)		SPO
Minister	Internal Affairs	Dragan Jočić		DSS
Minister	Defence	Zoran Stanković		Ind.
Minister	Finance	Mlađan Dinkić		G17+
Minister	Agriculture, Forestry and Water Management	Ivana Dulić-Marković (2004–2006)		G17+
Minister	Agriculture, Forestry and Water Management	Goran Živkov (2006)		G17+
Minister	Justice	Zoran Stojković		DSS
Minister	Labour, Employment, and Social Affairs	Slobodan Lalović		SDP
Minister	Health	Tomica Milosavljević (2004–2006)		G17+
Minister	Capital Investment	Velimir Ilić		NS
Minister	International Economic Relations	Predrag Bubalo (2004)		DSS
Minister	International Economic Relations	Milan Parivodić (2004–2006)		DSS
Minister	Culture	Dragan Kojadinović		SPO
Minister	Energy and Mining	Radomir Naumov		DSS
Minister	Education and Sport	Ljiljana Čolić (2004)		DSS
Minister	Education and Sport	Slobodan Vuksanović (2004–2007)		DSS
Minister	Trade Tourism and Services	Bojan Dimitrijević		SPO
Minister	Religion	Milan Radulović		DSS
Minister	Economy; Industry and Privatization	Dragan Maršićanin (2004)		DSS
Minister	Economy; Industry and Privatization	Predrag Bubalo (2004–2007)		DSS
Minister	Science and Environmental Protection	Aleksandar Popović		DSS
Minister	Public Administration and Local Self-Government	Zoran Lončar		DSS
Minister	Diaspora	Vojislav Vukčević		SPO

== Changes ==
- Dragan Maršićanin, Minister of Economy, resigned from his position in order to run at the presidential elections in June 2004. After finishing in fourth place, he was sent to Switzerland as an ambassador. The Ministry of Economy was then restructured and renamed into the Ministry of Industry and Privatization. On October 19, 2004, Minister of International Economic Relations Predrag Bubalo became Maršićanin's replacement as the new Minister of Industry and Privatization.
- Because Predrag Bubalo left his position as the Minister of International Economic Relations, that job went to Milan Parivodić on the same day October 19, 2004.
- Ljiljana Čolić was forced to leave the position of Education and Sport Minister on September 16, 2004 after she made several controversial decisions. These decisions concerned her interference into the Biology schoolbook contents when she demanded evolution part to be equalized with creationist theory. On October 19, 2004 Slobodan Vuksanović was named as her replacement.
- Deputy Prime Minister Miroljub Labus resigned on his position on May 3, 2006 after the EU froze talks with Serbia on accession. Labus was the head of the EU accession team but the government failed to arrest Ratko Mladić, which was the principal condition of the EU to further pursue talks with Serbia.
- Ivana Dulić-Marković had resigned from the position of Minister of Agriculture, Forestry and Water Management on June 15, 2006, as she had been nominated to become the new Deputy Prime Minister, the position she was elected for on June 20, 2006.
- On the same day Dulic was named new Deputy PM, Goran Živkov got named as her replacement as the new Minister of Agriculture, Forestry and Water Management.
- All Ministers, members of G17+ party, resigned on October 1 due to the fact EU stopped the accession negotiations with Serbia. These ministers are Ivana Dulić-Marković, Mlađan Dinkić, Goran Živkov, Tomica Milosavljević. These resignations will be effective after the session of parliament and the parliament will probably not have any further sessions before elections, which are now inevitable as the Government does not have the support of the Parliament.

== See also ==
- Cabinet of Serbia (2000–01)
- Cabinet of Serbia (2001–04)
- Cabinet of Serbia (2007–08)
- Cabinet of Serbia (2008–12)
- Cabinet of Serbia (2012–14)
