= Second cabinet of Vojislav Koštunica =

Cabinets of Serbia

Second Cabinet of Vojislav Koštunica
- 10th Cabinet of Republic of Serbia
- 2007–2008
- Date formed: 15 May 2007
- Date dissolved: 7 July 2008

People and organisations
- Head of state: Boris Tadić
- Head of government: Vojislav Koštunica
- Member parties: DS; DSS; NS; G17 Plus; SDP
- Status in legislature: Majority government

History
- Election: January 21, 2007
- Predecessor: Cabinet of Vojislav Koštunica I
- Successor: Cabinet of Mirko Cvetković

Second Government under Vojislav Koštunica as the Prime Minister was formed on 15 May 2007. After Serbian parliamentary election, 2008 this cabinet served as a transitional government handling only technical issues until the new government was formed on 7 July 2008.

The Government of Serbia was formed on 15 May 2007 after three-month-long negotiations and fierce political scandals and fighting that much disturbed the population, and exactly seven minutes before midnight when the three-month constitutional deadline would pass. It is formed by the Democratic Party (including the minority Sanjak Democratic Party), the coalition of the Democratic Party of Serbia and New Serbia, and G17 Plus. The DS, DSS-NS and G17+ parliamentary clubs elected the new cabinet proposed by Vojislav Koštunica (DSS), the previous Prime Minister, with the further support of some of the minorities (List for Sanjak and Roma Union of Serbia) votes accumulating 133 of the parliament's 250 seats. The Cabinet was sworn shortly before midnight, the deadline, in front of Milutin Mrkonjić (SPS), the temporary acting Speaker. The five new Ministers (Dragan Šutanovac, Božidar Đelić, Milan Marković, Mlađan Dinkić and Dušan Petrović) that were Deputies in the parliament have immediately filed their resignations, as per the Constitution which disables a Minister to be an active member in the National Assembly.

The Government collapsed on 8 March 2008. New parliamentary elections were held together with local elections on 11 May 2008. The new Government was formed on 7 July 2008.

== Composition ==
Position	Portfolio	Name	Image	Party
Prime Minister	General Affairs	Vojislav Koštunica		DSS
Deputy Prime Minister	European Integrations	Božidar Đelić		DS
Secretary-General		Dejan Mihajlov		DSS
Minister	Finance	Mirko Cvetković		Ind.
Minister	Agriculture, Forestry and Water Management	Slobodan Milosavljević		DS
Minister	Defence	Dragan Šutanovac		DS
Minister	Justice	Dušan Petrović		DS
Minister	Foreign Affairs	Vuk Jeremić		DS
Minister	Labour and Social Policy	Rasim Ljajić		SDP
Minister	Public Administration and Local Self-Government	Milan Marković		DS
Minister	Environmental Protection	Saša Dragin		DS
Minister	Telecommunications and Information Society	Aleksandra Smiljanić		DS
Minister	Diaspora	Milica Čubrilo		DS
Minister	Culture	Vojislav Brajović		DS
Minister without Portfolio	National Investment Plan	Dragan Đilas		DS
Minister	Interior	Dragan Jočić		DSS
Minister	Energy and Mining	Aleksandar Popović		DSS
Minister	Infrastructure	Velimir Ilić		NS
Minister	Kosovo-Metohija	Slobodan Samardžić		DSS
Minister	Education	Zoran Lončar		DSS
Minister	Trade and Services	Predrag Bubalo		DSS
Minister	Religion	Radomir Naumov		DSS
Minister	Economy and Regional Development	Mlađan Dinkić		G17+
Minister	Science	Ana Pešikan		G17+
Minister	Health	Tomica Milosavljević		G17+
Minister	Youth and Sports	Snežana Samardžić-Marković		G17+

== See also ==
- Cabinet of Serbia (2000–01)
- Cabinet of Serbia (2001–04)
- Cabinet of Serbia (2004–07)
- Cabinet of Serbia (2008–12)
- Cabinet of Serbia (2012–14)
- Politics of Serbia
