= Cabinet of Vojislav Koštunica =

Cabinet of Vojislav Koštunica may refer to:

- First cabinet of Vojislav Koštunica
- Second cabinet of Vojislav Koštunica
