= Ljiljana Čolić =

Serbian politician

Ljiljana Čolić Љиљана Чолић Ph.D.

Minister of Education and Sport
- In office 3 March 2004 – 19 October 2004
- Preceded by: Gašo Knežević
- Succeeded by: Slobodan Vuksanović

Personal details
- Born: 1956 (age 69–70) Zemun, PR Serbia, Yugoslavia
- Party: Democratic Party of Serbia

Ljiljana Čolić (Serbian: Љиљана Чолић; born 1956) is a Serbian orientalist, university professor and former politician. Čolić is the full professor at the department for Turkish language, literature and culture of the University of Belgrade's Faculty of Philology. She served as Minister for Education and Sport in the Government of Serbia for a few months in 2004, but resigned after public backlash when she tried to remove evolution from the elementary school curriculum.

== Biography ==
Čolić was born in Zemun, Yugoslavia in 1956. She is a self-avowed "devout Orthodox Christian". She speaks English and French fluently.

=== Academic career ===
Čolić holds a graduate degree in philosophy and a Ph.D. in philology. She graduated from the Faculty of Philology of the University of Belgrade in 1979, where she has been employed by since 1980. She became a Phd in 1994. She is a full professor of Ottoman Turkish language and Ottoman paleography. For a time, she worked as a guest lecturer at the Faculty of Philosophy of the University of Priština.

=== Political life ===
Čolić was one of the founders of the Democratic Party of Serbia. She was a deputy in the Federal Parliament of Serbia and Montenegro between 2000 and 2004. There, in 2002, she was among the sponsors of the Declaration on the protection of the Serbian Cyrillic alphabet. She was the leader of the parliamentary friendship group for the United Kingdom.

In March 2004, Čolić was named Minister of Education and Sport in the First cabinet of Vojislav Koštunica. As a conservative government superseded a reformist one, Čolić worked to alter and reverse changes from the previous government. Čolić had a strong support from the Serbian Orthodox Church because she opted for the reinforcement of religious education in schools, even proposing that the icon of Saint Sava should be placed on the official website of the ministry.

As an education minister, Čolić refused to sign the introduction of Bosnian language in school curriculum. She also relegated computer education for elementary students to the status of optional subject, claiming that "for medical reasons it is not good to expose seven-year-olds to computer radiation".

Čolić garnered controversy in September 2004 when she ordered Serbian schools to suspend the teaching of evolution unless they introduced creationism. Colic claimed that the two theories were "equally dogmatic". Researchers, teachers, the Serbian Academy of Science and Arts and some 40 non-government organisations and human rights groups voiced their concern over such a move, including UNICEF. After widespread protest, on September 9, Prime Minister Vojislav Koštunica reversed the decision and announced that Čolić would be replaced. On September 16, 2004, she resigned after a meeting with Koštunica. Slobodan Vuksanović replaced her in October 2004.

In June 2006 she published a book titled Put (Path), staunchly defending her actions as a minister of education. During the official promotion of her book, she claimed that during her tenure, when she asked foreign advisors why they pushed so hard for the reform of Serbian education, she was told that "they need plumbers, not educated people".

In an interview in November 2019, professor Milan M. Ćirković discussed pseudoscience. He mentioned Čolić's short ministerial stint, adding that because of her removal of Darwinism, she was "depicted as a heroine in the magazines and books of the global creationist movement". Čolić responded with a letter, underlining Ćirković's claim that some pseudoscience are life threatening, though he specifically used it for other movements like pseudo-medicine, quackery and antivaxers. Čolić wrote: "difference between us - adherents of the "life threatening pseudoscience", and them - serious scientists, is that we accept that incomprehensible is indeed incomprehensible, unlike them who claim that incomprehensible is comprehensible. They unlimitedly believe in limited science, and we believe in super-science - impervious to the limited human mind. As for the two 8th grade biology lessons in elementary school which I "plucked" from Darwin's ape, I added them to the previous lesson: Family and health - healthy family. Role of the family. Delinquency. Restraining and treatment of addiction illnesses."

Preceded by Gašo Knežević	Minister of Education and Sport; 2004	Succeeded by Slobodan Vuksanović
