= Radojko =

Radojko (Cyrillic script: Радојко) is a masculine given name of Slavic origin. Notable people with the name include:

- Radojko Avramović (born 1949), Serbian football coach
- Radojko Obradović (born 1966), Serbian politician
