= Church restitution =

Church restitution,Church property restitution, Church Restitution Law, etc. may refer to:

- Church restitution in the Czech Republic
- Church property restitution in Serbia
- Russian Church property restitution
- Church property restitution in Poland
