= Slobodan Milosavljević =

Serbian economist and politician

Slobodan St. Milosavljević
- Слободан Ст. Милосављевић
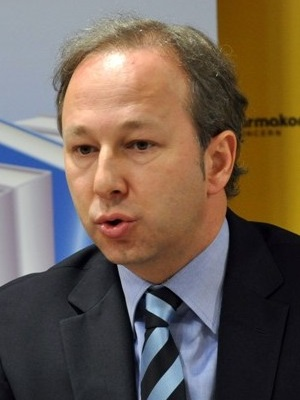

Minister of Trade and Services
- In office 7 July 2008 – 14 March 2011
- Preceded by: Predrag Bubalo
- Succeeded by: Dušan Petrović (Merged into Ministry of Agriculture)

Minister of Agriculture, Forestry and Water Management
- In office 15 May 2007 – 7 July 2008
- Preceded by: Ivana Dulić-Marković
- Succeeded by: Saša Dragin

Minister of Trade, Tourism and Services
- In office 25 January 2001 – 3 March 2004
- Succeeded by: Bojan Dimitrijević

Personal details
- Born: 19 November 1965 (age 60) Belgrade, Yugoslavia
- Party: Democratic Party (2003–2020)
- Education: Ph.D. of University of Belgrade
- Occupation: Politician
- Profession: Economist

Slobodan St. Milosavljević (Serbian Cyrillic: Слободан Ст. Милосављевић, born 19 November 1965) is a Serbian economist and politician.

== Early life ==
He graduated from the University of Belgrade Faculty of Economics in 1990, where he also received an MA in 1996 and a PhD in macroeconomics and management in 2001. From 1991 he worked at the Market Research Institute (IZIT) in Belgrade and from 1996 served as Director of the Centre for Market Research and Macroeconomic Analysis.

== Political career ==
In the period 2001–2004 he was Minister of Trade, Tourism and Services in the first Serbian democratic government and from 2004 President of the Serbian Chamber of Commerce. He is also President of the National Committee of the International Chamber of Commerce, Vice-President of the Euro-Mediterranean association Euro/Med TDS, member of the ASCAME Executive Board and member of the Managing Board of the Chamber of Italian, Serbian and Montenegrin Businessmen. He was Secretary General of the Yugoslav Marketing Association (JUMA) and in 1996 and 1997 economics and commercial advisor for AYUCO International in Abu Dhabi. In the period 2001/2004 he was also President of the government Committee for monitoring living standards, President of the Supervising Board of the Serbian Development Fund and member of the Executive Board of the Belgrade Business School and the National Employment Service. He was awarded the 2005 PRO DANUBIO prize for his contribution to the development of Danubian countries, development projects, peace and tolerance in the Southeast European region. He was also awarded the Michael I. Pupin Medal in 2005 by the Serbian Academy of Sciences and Arts. He has published over 50 scientific and research works in various journals, publications and monographs of national and international importance. From December 2004 he is President of the Resource Board for Trade, Tourism and Services.

Between 15 May 2007 and 7 July 2008, he served as the Minister of Agriculture, Forestry and Water Management.

From 2008 to 2011, Milosavljević was serving as the Minister of Trade and Services.

On December 26, 2015, he was arrested on corruption charges, along with 78 other politicians and businessmen.

== Personal ==
He speaks English and is married, with two children.

He was a member of the presidency of KK Crvena zvezda.

== See also ==
- Government of Serbia

Government offices
Preceded by Milorad Mišković	Minister of Trade, Tourism and Services of Serbia; 2001 – 2004	Succeeded by Bojan Dimitrijević
Preceded by Ivana Dulić-Marković	Minister of Agriculture, Forestry and Water Management of Serbia; 2007 – 2008	Succeeded by Saša Dragin
Preceded by Predrag Bubalo	Minister of Trade and Services of Serbia; 2008 – 2011	Succeeded by Dušan Petrović (Merged with Ministry of Agriculture)
