= Bozidar Delic =

Božidar Delić may refer to:

- Božidar Delić (1956–2022), Serbian general and politician
- Božidar Đelić (born 1965), Serbian economist and politician
