= Goran Živkov =

Serbian politician (born 1971)

- Горан Живков
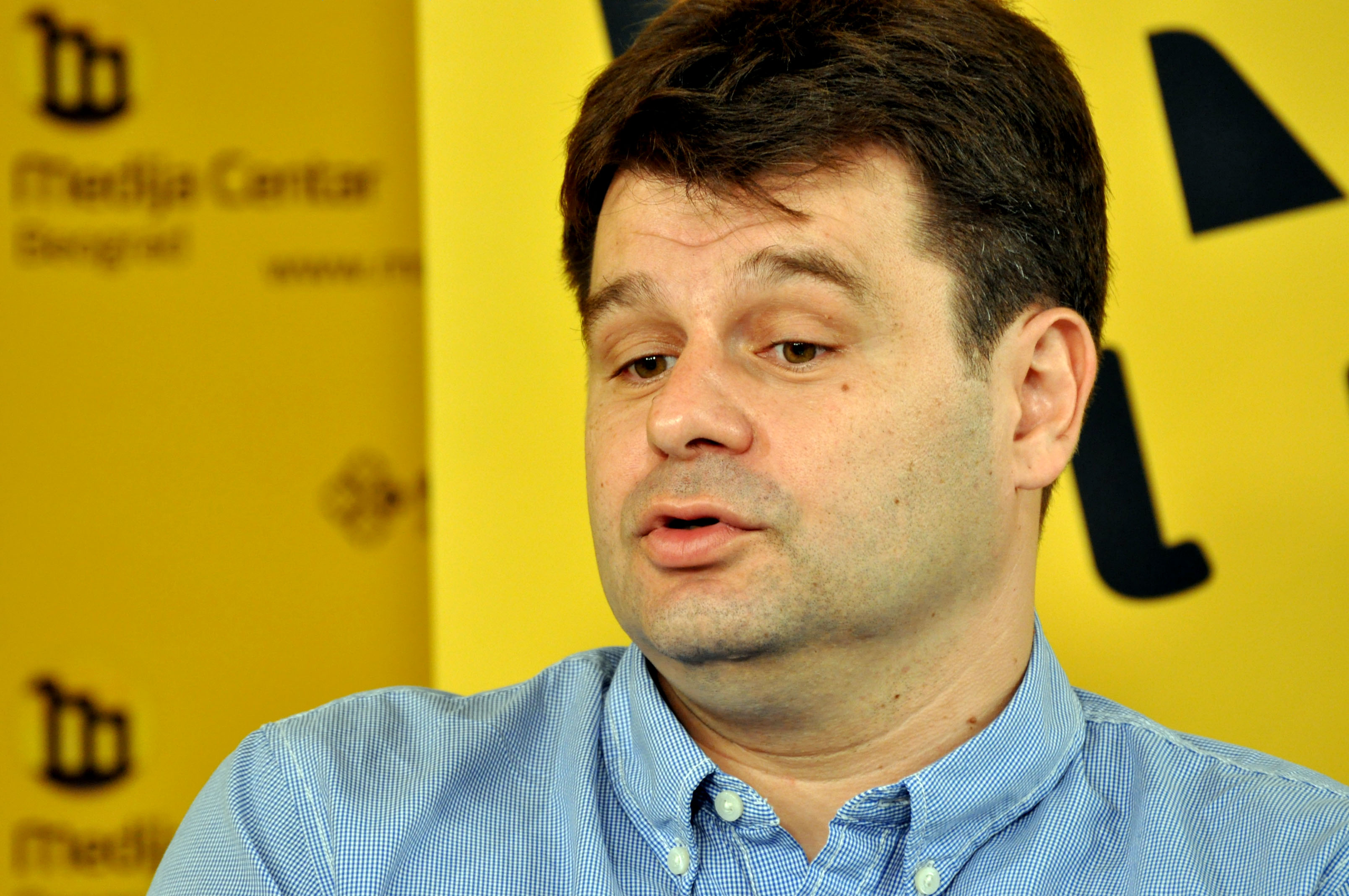

Minister of Agriculture, Forestry and Water Management
- In office 19 June 2006 – 9 November 2006
- Prime Minister: Vojislav Koštunica
- Preceded by: Ivana Dulić Marković

Personal details
- Born: 1971 (age 54–55) Kikinda, SFR Yugoslavia (now Serbia)
- Party: G17 Plus
- Occupation: Politician

Goran Živkov (Serbian Cyrillic: Горан Живков; born 1971 in Kikinda, Serbia, Yugoslavia) is a Serbian politician.

On June 20, 2006, he was appointed as the Minister of Agriculture, Forestry and Water Management in the Government of Serbia and resigned on October 1. He graduated from the Faculty of Agriculture at the University of Belgrade in 1996.

Before becoming minister he worked as the advisor in Federal Ministry of Agriculture, then he became head of the Unit for Genetic Resources and GMO. He worked as national consultant at the office of the Food and Agriculture Organisation. He was appointed assistant minister of agriculture in June 2004.

He replaced Ivana Dulić-Marković at the position, after she was elected for the Deputy Prime Minister in June 2006.
