= Dobrosav Milovanović =

Serbian lawyer and politician

Dobrosav Milovanović is a Serbian lawyer. He served as the Deputy Minister for International Economic Relations in the Government of Serbia (2001-2004). He has a law degree from the University of Belgrade's Law School, as well as a Master's degree and a PhD from the same faculty.

He is a former chairman of the Serbian Securities Commission and is the vice-president of the Serbian Association of Lawyers. Since leaving politics he has been in business working as the director of the Economics Institute of Belgrade (EKI) and is the director of the Public Administration Center.
