= Snežana Malović =

Serbian politician

- Снежана Маловић
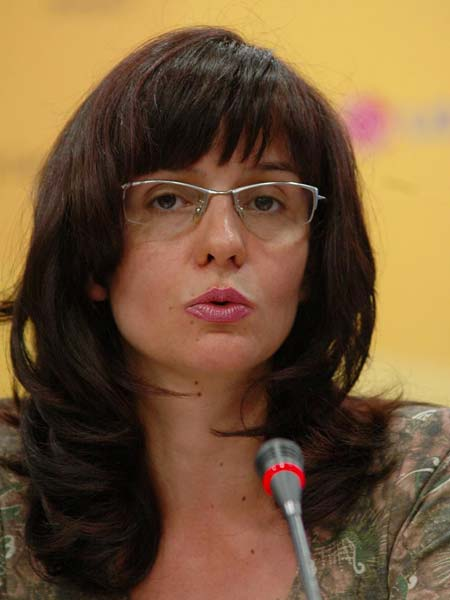
- Malović in 2008

Minister of Justice
- In office 7 July 2008 – 27 July 2012
- Prime Minister: Mirko Cvetković
- Preceded by: Dušan Petrović
- Succeeded by: Nikola Selaković

Personal details
- Born: 10 September 1976 (age 50) Belgrade, SR Serbia, SFR Yugoslavia
- Party: Social Democratic Party (2014–); Democratic Party (until 2014)
- Spouse: Vuk Malović
- Children: 2
- Education: LL.B. of Univ. of Belgrade
- Profession: Lawyer

Snežana Malović (Serbian Cyrillic: Снежана Маловић, pronounced [sněʒana mâːloʋitɕ], born 10 September 1976) is a Serbian politician and former Minister of Justice in the Government of Serbia, and a former member of the Democratic Party.

She served as Deputy Secretary to the Ministry of Justice and Local Self-Administration from 2001 to 2002 and Private Secretary of the Minister of Justice and Local Self-Administration from 2002 to 2003. From 2004 to 2007, she was General Secretary of the War Crimes Prosecution Service.

== Background ==
Malović graduated from the University of Belgrade's Law School, after which she worked as a law clerk from 1999 to 2001. She passed bar examination in 2002 and became a post-graduate student of the Belgrade University Faculty of Law.

Malović is an author of numerous projects dealing with the judiciary. She participates in working groups drafting diverse legislation. In seminars and international conferences on international humanitarian law, war crimes in the region, her work is against corruption and organised crime and the public administration.

In November 2007, she was appointed State Secretary. On 7 July 2008, she was appointed Minister of Justice.

Government offices
Preceded by Dušan Petrović	Minister of Justice of Serbia; 2008–2012	Succeeded by Nikola Selaković
