= Ferenc Mokanj =

Serbian politician

Ferenc Mokanj a senior member of the Reformists of Vojvodina political party which was a member of the Democratic Opposition of Serbia coalition which finally ousted Slobodan Milosevic in October 2000 after he attempted to rig the presidential election which he had lost in September of that year. Mr Mokanj was the Deputy Minister of Trade and Tourism in the Cabinet of Serbia (2001–2004).
