= Živojin Stjepić =

Serbian politician (born 1967)

Zivojin Stjepić (born 1967) is a Serbian politician. He served as the Deputy Minister of Religion in the Government of Serbia (2001-2004). In this role, he was in large part responsible for the reinstitution of religious education as a school subject in Serbian schools after it had been ignored for 60 years by the communist regime. He was a vice-president of the Christian Democratic Party of Serbia, which is a right of centre, pro Monarchist Serbian political party.
