= Dušan Petrović =

Serbian politician

- Душан Петровић
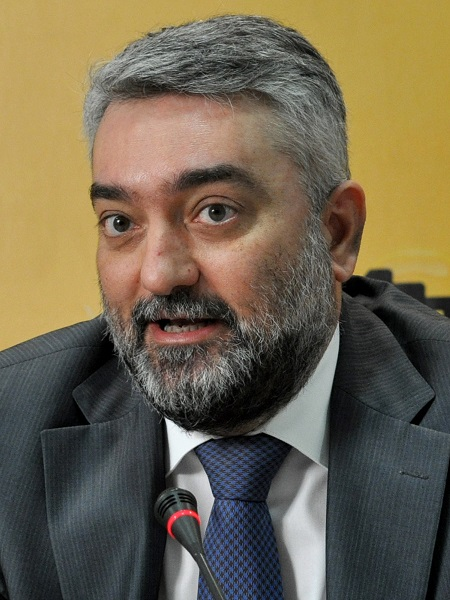

Minister of Agriculture, Trade, Forestry and Water Management
- In office 14 March 2011 – 27 July 2012
- Preceded by: Slobodan Milosavljević (Trade and Services); Saša Dragin (Agriculture, Forestry and Water Management)
- Succeeded by: Goran Knežević (Agriculture, Forestry and Water Management); Rasim Ljajić (Trade)

Minister of Justice
- In office 15 May 2007 – 7 July 2008
- Preceded by: Zoran Stojković
- Succeeded by: Snežana Malović

Personal details
- Born: 8 September 1966 (age 60) Šabac, Yugoslavia
- Party: Democratic Party (1992–2013); Together for Serbia (2013–2022)
- Education: LL.B. of Univ. of Belgrade
- Profession: Lawyer

Dušan Petrović (Serbian Cyrillic: Душан Петровић, pronounced [dǔʃan pětroʋitɕ]; born 8 September 1966) is a Serbian former politician, a former long-time member of Democratic Party (DS) and the former Minister of Agriculture, Trade, Forestry and Water Management between 2011 and 2012 and former Minister of Justice in the Government of Serbia between 2007 and 2008.

Leader of the broken-off wing of DS, he was the chairman of the Together for Serbia party from 2013 to 2016.

== Biography ==
Petrović completed elementary and high school in his hometown of Šabac, and graduated from the University of Belgrade's Law School. From 1992 to 2000 he worked as a lawyer, and from 2000 to 2004 he was the mayor of Šabac, as well as a deputy in the House of Citizens in the Parliament of Federal Republic of Yugoslavia. He is the member of the Democratic Party since 1992, and he progressed from the position of its local council in Šabac (1996), member of the party's Presidency (2000), one of its vice-presidents (since 18 February 2006), and the deputy president to the party's chairman Boris Tadić (since 25 March 2006). In the National Assembly of Serbia, where he was elected in the 2003 election he held the position of chief of DS deputy group, and in 2003–2007 he was also the vice-president of the Assembly.

After difficult tripartite negotiations among Democratic Party, Democratic Party of Serbia and G17+ following the 2007 elections he became the Minister of Justice in the government led by Vojislav Koštunica.

== General references ==
- Biography, Official website of Democratic Party.

== Notes ==
Political offices
Preceded by Zoran Stojković	Minister of Justice of Serbia; 2007–2008	Succeeded by Snežana Malović
Preceded by Slobodan Milosavljević (Trade and Services); Saša Dragin (Agriculture, Forestry and Water Management)	Minister of Agriculture, Trade, Forestry and Water Management of Serbia; 2011–2012	Succeeded by Goran Knežević (Agriculture, Forestry and Water Management); Rasim Ljajić (Trade)
