= Dimitrije Vukčević =

Serbian politician

Dimitrije Vukčević studied Nuclear Physics at the University of Belgrade before embarking on a career in commerce. In the 1990s he spent a number of years living and working in the United States. On his return to Serbia, he was appointed by Zoran Đinđić as the Deputy Minister of Energy and Mining in the Government of Serbia (2001-2004) due to his expertise.

From his position as Deputy Minister he was appointed CEO of Naftna Industrija Srbije NIS (Oil Industry of Serbia), a state-owned enterprise, and one of the biggest Serbian companies.
