= Vigor Majić =

Serbian academic

Vigor Majić was the Deputy Minister of Education and Sport in the Government of Serbia (2001-2004).

== Overview ==
Prior to being appointed as Deputy Minister, he had been the director of the Petnica Science Center in Serbia since 1982, when he was one of the founders of the centre. Since leaving his government post, he has again resumed his position as director of the Petnica Science Center in Serbia. In 2021 he stepped down from the position of a director but remained in the organization as an advisor. Petnica Science Center is a non-governmental, non-profit and independent educational institution founded to help and support young people who demonstrate an exceptional interest in science beyond the school curricula.
