= Slobodan Vuksanović =

Serbian writer and politician (born 1965)

Slobodan Vuksanović Слободан Вуксановић
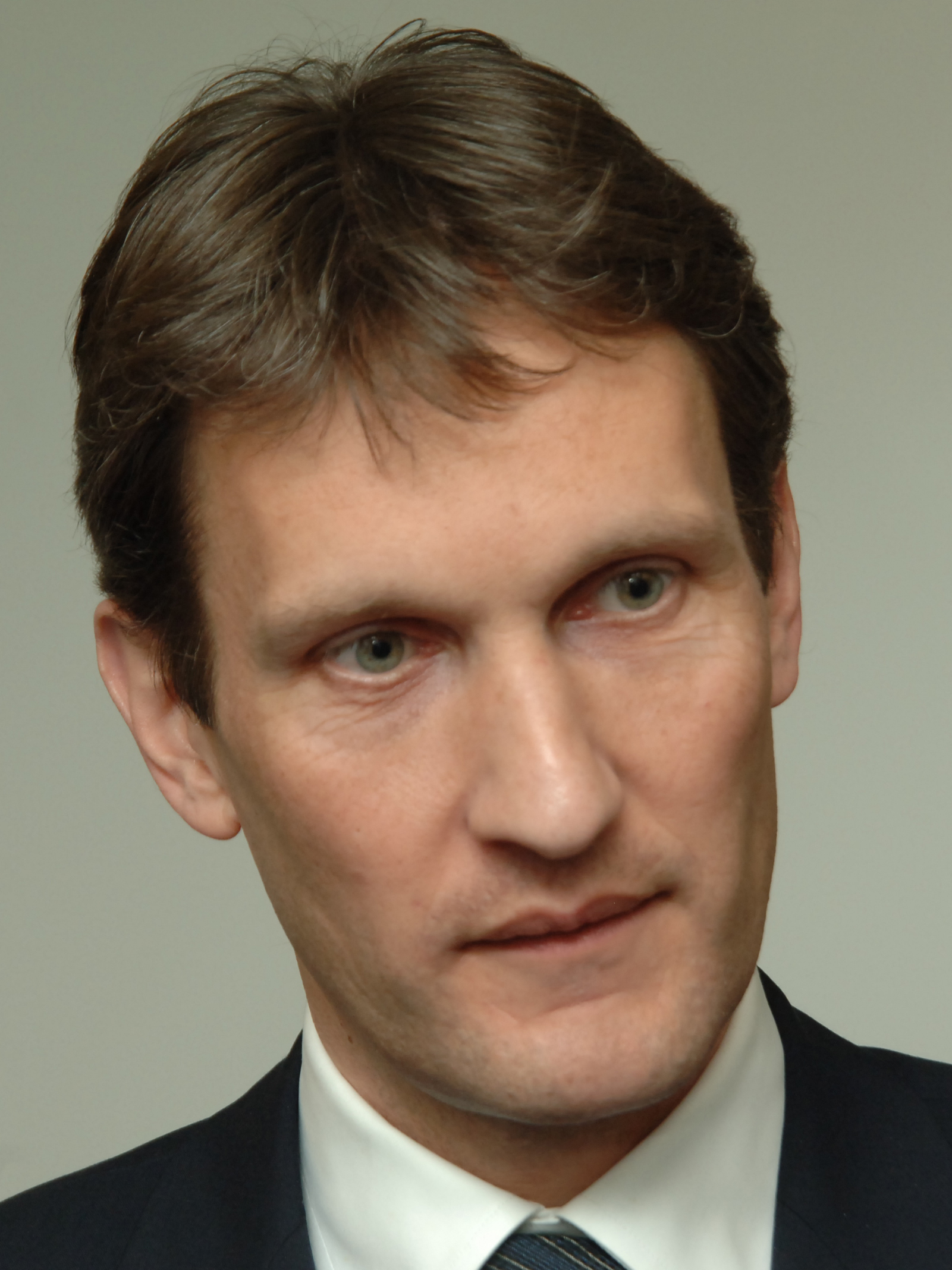
- Vuksanović in 2006

Minister of Education and Sport
- In office 19 October 2004 – 15 May 2007
- Preceded by: Ljiljana Čolić
- Succeeded by: Zoran Lončar; Snežana Samardžić-Marković (Youth and Sport)

Personal details
- Born: 2 May 1965 (age 61) Belgrade, Serbia, SFR Yugoslavia
- Party: Democratic Party (1993–2000); People's Democratic Party (2001–2004); Democratic Party of Serbia (2004–2013)

Slobodan Vuksanović (Serbian Cyrillic: Слободан Вуксановић, born in 1965 in Belgrade) is a poet, essayist, translator and former Serbian politician, who served as Minister of Education and Sport in the Government of Serbia from 2004 to 2007.

== Biography ==
He was appointed as a minister on October 19, 2004, after an unsuccessful attempt to become mayor of Belgrade. He replaced Ljiljana Čolić, who was forced to leave after she made several controversial decisions.

He graduated with a bachelor's degree in literature from the University of Belgrade, and obtained his PhD at the University of Novi Sad. He has been the editor of several magazines, a teacher in a secondary school, and has written 12 books. He was the president of the People's Democratic Party, which integrated into the Democratic Party of Serbia in 2004. Vuksanović decided to leave DSS in April 2013 stating that his membership became pointless, as he had no party assignment being a passive member for five years.

He received his Ph.D. at the European University in Belgrade in the field of International relations, in 2009. Professor of Methodology of literature and Literature for children at the State University of Novi Pazar from 2009 to 2014. He has published 25 books - essays, manuals, textbooks, monodramas, novels and poems. Vuksanovic quit his job at the State University of Novi Pazar in December 2013 and moved to private school in Belgrade - MEF - ( management, economics, finance, mathematics, computer science, communication studies, sociology), where is the head of the Department of Social Sciences and teaches Sociology and Communication. Amended to the book Outstanding intellectuals 2010 Biographical Institute, University of Cambridge.

Vuksanović speaks English.

== Selected bibliography ==
With a translator Irena Kostic, translated S - John Updike (1989) and Eternal grief - and Book about gods and angels, Charles Simic (1989).

- Halley's comet over Kosovo (1990), Poems, Hypnos, Belgrade
- Essay about angels (1992), Poems, Rad, Belgrade
- Journey Helen Erdeljan (1993), Poems, Student Cultural Center, Belgrade
- Hand made by fire (1994), Poems, Rad, Belgrade
- Now think of the head (1995), second edition (1997) and third (2000), this monodrama premiered on October 3, 1996. In the theater Radovic, BIGZ, Belgrade
- Unspoken poems (1993), Essays, Dečje novine, Gornji Milanovac
- Bicycle writings of (1993), Essays, Cultural Center, S. Palanka
- Songs from the border (1995), Essays, Prosveta, Belgrade
- Poetics homeland (1998), Essays, Kultura, Cacak
- Far from the sensational (2000), Essays, Blic, Belgrade
- Fox on the asphalt (2000), Novel, Euro, Belgrade
- Suppressed Literature (2003), Essays, The Association of Writers of Serbia
- Poem of Kosovo (1991), bilingual anthology of poetry
- Political Communication (2009), Essays, Prosveta, Belgrade
- God forbid, God forbid (2009), Monodrama-monodramas, bilingual, Serbian-English edition, Prosveta, Belgrade
- Notes on Reading Materials I (2009), Essays, Knjiga-komerc, Belgrade
- Notes on Reading Materials II (2009), Essays Knjiga-komerc, Belgrade
- Little People (review of literature for children) (2010), Essays, Knjiga-komerc, Belgrade
- 56 examples, manual processing and methodological lessons, Essays (2011), Knjiga-komerc, Belgrade
- Methodical reminder - Manual for students and teachers (2012), Knjiga-komerc, Belgrade
- Small letters large Anji (2012), Laguna, Beograd
- General characteristics of children's literature (2012), a manual for students and teachers, Sprint, Belgrade
- Methodical practice (2012), a manual for students and teachers, Sprint, Belgrade
- Small letters to my daughter Anya (2013), second edition, Laguna, Beograd
- Letters to my daughter Anya (2013), published in English, Laguna, Beograd
- The secret of a courtyard (2014) Poems for teenagers, Čigoja, Belgrade
- Pavlovic shop (2015) Stories, Čigoja, Belgrade

Government offices
Preceded by Ljiljana Čolić	Minister of Education and Sports; 2004–2007	Succeeded by Zoran Lončar (as Minister of Education); Snežana Samardžić-Marković (as Minister of Youth and Sports)
