= Milan Parivodić =

Serbian politician

- Милан Париводић
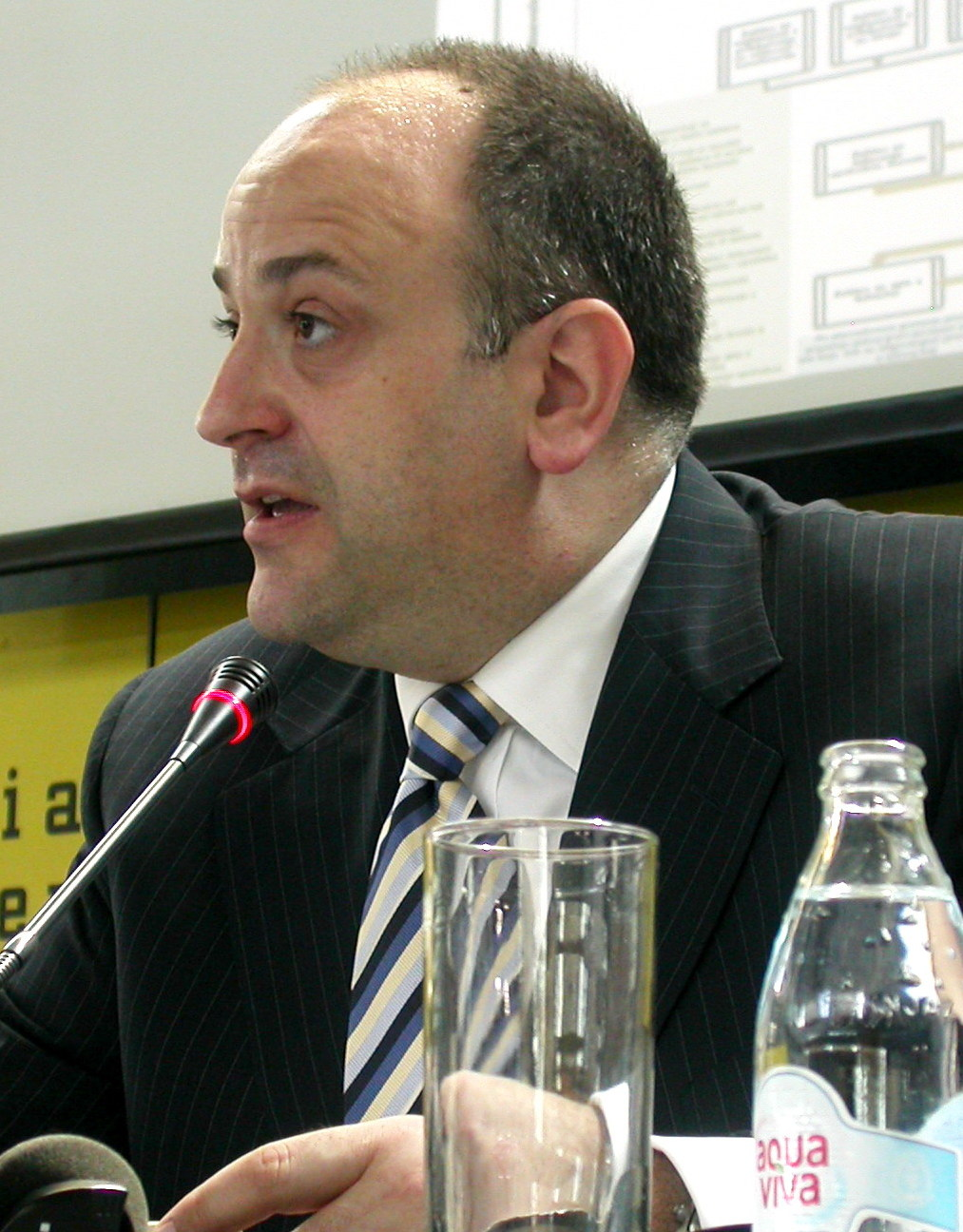

Minister of Foreign Economic Relations
- In office 19 October 2004 – 15 May 2007
- Preceded by: Predrag Bubalo
- Succeeded by: Mlađan Dinkić (Merged into Ministry of Economy and Regional Development)

Personal details
- Born: 1966 (age 59–60) Belgrade, SR Serbia, SFR Yugoslavia

Milan Parivodić Serbian Cyrillic Милан Париводић (born in 1966 in Belgrade) was the Minister of Foreign Economic Relations in the Government of Serbia from 2004 to 2007. Also, between 14 November 2006 and 15 May 2007, he served as the co-ordinator of the Ministry of Finance. Between 2007 and 2008 he was the advisor to the Prime Minister of Serbia for economy and law.

== Education ==
Parivodić graduated in Laws in 1990 (cum magna laude) from the Faculty of Law of the University of Belgrade. There he also received a Master of Laws in 1995 and a Doctorate of Laws by defending his doctoral thesis "Franchising Contracts" in 2002. He was also awarded an LLM degree from University College London in 1997. He took and passed the Serbian Bar Examination in 2008.

== University and Law Work ==
Milan Parivodić was a lecturer in civil law and property law at the University Of Belgrade Faculty Of Laws from 1991 to 2004. At this time he was a legal consultant for major foreign companies and banks. He also worked as a consultant for the World Bank.

In this period he served as member of several law reform commissions and participated in drafting new laws: Foreign investment law, Law on concessions, Draft law on trade, Law on registered pledge, Law on religious freedom, Law on music and scenic activities.

He lectured on judicial training programmes for commercial court judges organised by USAID.

He was included in the »list of 10 highly experienced law offices« by the Serbian investment and export promotion agency (SIEPA) and the Serbian ministry of foreign economic relations. He was on recommended lawyers list of the US, UK and German embassies in Belgrade. Also, he was registered as patent & trade mark attorney with the Yugoslav federal intellectual property. He is sworn-in court translator for English language of the district court of Belgrade.

== Government ==
He was appointed a Minister of Foreign Economic Relations on October 19, 2004, replacing Predrag Bubalo who became Minister of Economy.

In his ministerial position Parivodić reformed areas of commercial law: drafted and defended in Parliament the Foreign Trade Law, Mortgage Law, Arbitration Law, IP Enforcement Law, and Church Property Restitution Law.

Parivodić was awarded the Serbian Royal Order of the White Eagle, Grand Cross in February 2007.

Parivodic headed the Serbian WTO accession process from 2005-2007. He negotiated and signed the EU – Serbia Textile agreement, the first agreement between Serbia and EU. Also, he led negotiations and signed the Central European Free Trade Agreement in 2006 for Serbia.

He presided over the Government’s inter-ministerial Committee for improving business climate in Serbia and co-presided the Serbian - Bavarian Council from 2005-2007.

He was a member of the Democratic Party of Serbia until 2008.

== Lawyer ==
After leaving the government in May 2007 Parivodić became a partner in the Austrian law firm Wolf Theiss, managing their Belgrade office (2007-2009).

Today he is practicing law at his Law firm Parivodic.

== Awards and recognitions ==
- 2007: Grand Cross of the Order of the White Eagle (Serbia)

== Publications ==
Milan Parivodic published "Exclusive Distribution in the Laws of Yugoslavia and the European Community" (Official Gazette of Yugoslavia, pp. 176) in 1996 and for his Ph.D. thesis he published "Law of International Franchising" (Official Gazette of Serbia, 380pp.) in 2003. He also has numerous Publications in International and Serbian Law Journals in the fields of International Trade Law, Contract Law, Intellectual Property, Competition Law, and Distribution Law.

Government offices
Preceded by Predrag Bubalo	Minister of Foreign Economic Relations of Serbia; 2004 – 2007	Succeeded by Mlađan Dinkić (Merged into Ministry of Economy and Regional Development)
