= Zoran Stojković =

Serbian politician (1946–2020)

Zoran Stojković Зоран Стојковић

Minister of Justice
- In office 3 March 2004 – 15 May 2007
- Prime Minister: Vojislav Koštunica
- Preceded by: Vladan Batić
- Succeeded by: Dušan Petrović

Personal details
- Born: 7 October 1946 Belgrade, Serbia, FPR Yugoslavia
- Died: 5 July 2020 (aged 73) Belgrade, Serbia
- Party: Democratic Party of Serbia (1992–2014); Independent (2014–2020)
- Education: Belgrade Law School

Zoran Stojković (Serbian Cyrillic: Зоран Стојковић; 7 October 1946 — 6 July 2020) was a Serbian politician who served as Minister of Justice in the Government of Serbia from 2004 to 2007.

Stojković graduated from the University of Belgrade's Law School and initially worked as district court judge. In the late 1980s he began a private law practice. In 1984, as a Yugoslav communist-era judge, Stojković convicted six dissidents in a trial dubbed by Amnesty International as the "last Stalinist trial in Europe". Stojković is one of the people who founded the Democratic Party of Serbia, and the Serbian election committee employed him for several elections. He was married and had two children.

Government offices
Preceded by Vladan Batić	Minister of Justice; 2004 – 2007	Succeeded by Dušan Petrović
