= Saša Dragin =

Serbian politician

- Саша Драгин
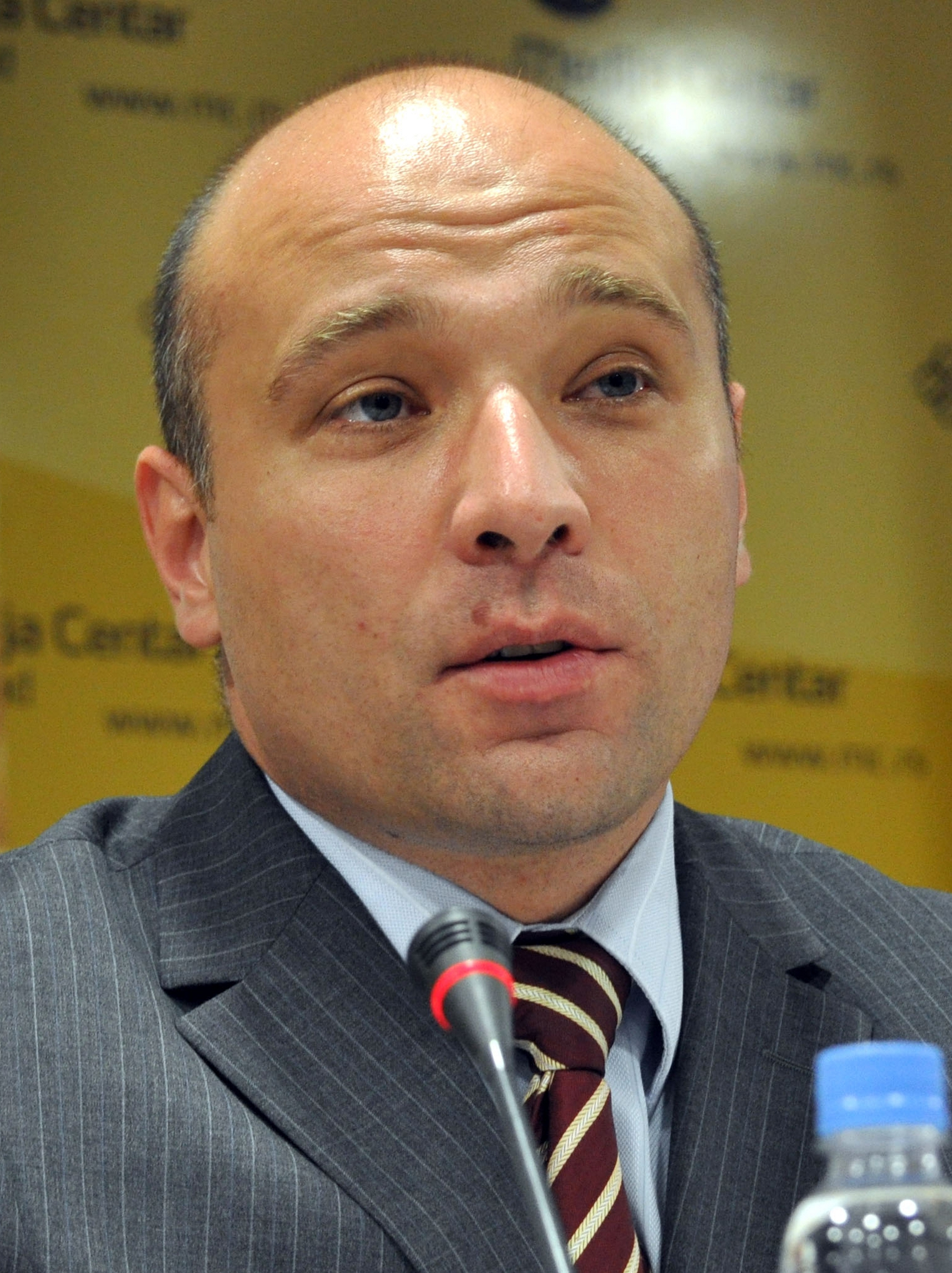

Minister of Agriculture, Forestry and Water Management
- In office 7 July 2008 – 14 March 2011
- Preceded by: Slobodan Milosavljević
- Succeeded by: Dušan Petrović

Minister of Environmental Protection
- In office 15 May 2007 – 7 July 2008
- Preceded by: Aleksandar Popović
- Succeeded by: Oliver Dulić

Personal details
- Born: 10 June 1972 (age 54) Sombor, SFR Yugoslavia
- Party: Democratic Party

Saša Dragin (Serbian: Саша Драгин) is former Minister of Agriculture, Forestry and Water Management in the Government of Serbia (2008–2011). He was previously the Minister of Environmental Protection.

== Biography ==
He was born in Sombor in 1972. He graduated in 1999 from the Faculty of Agriculture, University of Novi Sad and received an MSc in 2003, followed by a PhD in 2007. From 2005 he was Vojvodina Deputy-Secretary of Agriculture, Water Management and Forestry. He is a founder of the International Organisation of Agriculture Students and a founder and President of Junior Chamber International (JCI) Novi Sad and former National President of JCI Serbia. He was President of ICPDR (International Commission for Danube Protection) in 2008–2009. He is married and has two daughters.

Dragin left the government in a government reshuffle in March 2011.

Government offices
Preceded by Aleksandar Popović; Minister of Science and Environmental Protection	Minister of Environmental Protection of Serbia; 2007 – 2008	Succeeded by Oliver Dulić; Minister of Environment and Spatial Planning
Preceded by Slobodan Milosavljević	Minister of Agriculture, Forestry and Water Management of Serbia; 2008 - 2011	Succeeded by Dušan Petrović
