= Liljana Lučić =

Serbian politician

Liljana Lučić MP

Personal details
- Born: 3 October 1953 (age 73) Belgrade
- Party: Democratic Party
- Education: Univ. of Belgrade
- Occupation: Sociology

Liljana Lučić (born 1953 in Belgrade, Serbia). Lučić studied Sociology at the University of Belgrade Faculty of Philosophy. Her professional career she spent working as a Professor and Consultant at the Federal Agency for International Cultural and Educational Co-operation in Belgrade.

She has been a member of the Democratic Party since 1992. She has been elected to serve as the President of the Executive Committee, the Secretary of the Party and also as Vice-President of the Democratic Party. She is currently a member of the General Committee of the Party.

She was a Member of the National Assembly of Serbia from the Democratic Party list between 1993 and 1997. From 2000 to 2006 she was a Member of Federal Assembly of the Federal Republic of Yugoslavia and Assembly of the State Union of Serbia and Montenegro. She was a delegate from the Assembly of State Union of Serbia and Montenegro to the Parliamentary Assembly of the Council of Europe.

In the Government of Serbia (2001-2004) she served as the Deputy Minister for Social Affairs. In July 2008 she was appointed State Secretary for Social Policy in the Ministry for Work and Social Policy.
