= Dragan Tomić (Serbian politician, born 1935) =

Serbian politician (1935–2022)

- Драган Томић
- Tomić in the 1990s

President of the National Assembly of Serbia
- In office 1 February 1994 – 22 January 2001
- Preceded by: Zoran Aranđelović
- Succeeded by: Dragan Maršićanin

President of Serbia
- Acting
- In office 23 July 1997 – 29 December 1997
- Prime Minister: Mirko Marjanović
- Preceded by: Slobodan Milošević
- Succeeded by: Milan Milutinović

Personal details
- Born: 9 December 1935 Priština, Yugoslavia
- Died: 21 June 2022 (aged 86)
- Party: SKJ (until 1990); SPS (1990–2022)

Dragan Tomić (Serbian Cyrillic: Драган Томић; 9 December 1935 – 21 June 2022) was a Serbian politician who served as the president of the National Assembly of Serbia from 1994 to 2001. He was a member of the Socialist Party of Serbia and was considered a loyal supporter of Slobodan Milošević. Tomić was director of RTV Politika, one of Serbia's main TV stations, and director of Jugopetrol AD, the state oil company.

He was a member of the League of Communists of Yugoslavia. After Milošević reached the end of his two allowed terms as President of Serbia and got himself elected as President of Serbia and Montenegro, Tomić by default became acting President of Serbia, from 23 July to 29 December 1997.

Tomić was closely tied to Milošević. A 2000 report by Germany's Federal Intelligence Service alleged that Milošević essentially ran a criminal operation, particularly after the 1992 sanctions on Yugoslavia caused "massive smuggling operations...controlled by Milošević and his cronies, who made vast profits from it"; Tomić was named as one of those cronies. Under Milošević's regime, Tomić led Jugopetrol when "fuel-smuggling was a multi-million dollar business", and "reportedly profited handsomely from the illicit oil that flowed into Serbia during sanctions". Serbian mobster and paramilitary leader Arkan gave Tomić a medal because he had provided gasoline for Arkan's Serb Volunteer Guard, a paramilitary unit suspected of war crimes and ethnic cleansing.

Political offices
Preceded by Slobodan Milošević	President of Serbia; Acting; 1997	Succeeded by Milan Milutinović
