= Predrag Bubalo =

Serbian politician

- Предраг Бубало
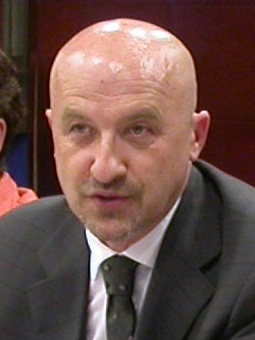

Minister of Trade
- In office 15 May 2007 – 7 July 2008
- Preceded by: Bojan Dimitrijević
- Succeeded by: Slobodan Milosavljević

Minister of Economy
- In office 19 October 2004 – 15 May 2007
- Preceded by: Dragan Maršićanin
- Succeeded by: Mlađan Dinkić

Minister of Foreign Economic Relations
- In office 3 March 2004 – 19 October 2004
- Preceded by: Goran Pitić
- Succeeded by: Milan Parivodić

Personal details
- Born: 14 October 1954 (age 71) Vladičin Han, SR Serbia, SFR Yugoslavia
- Party: Democratic Party of Serbia
- Education: LL.B. of University of Novi Sad
- Occupation: Businessman, ex-Politician
- Profession: Legal

Predrag Bubalo (Serbian: Предраг Бубало; born 14 October 1954) is a Serbian politician who held various ministerial positions in the Government of Serbia. He served as the Minister of Foreign Economic Relations in 2004, as the Minister of Economy from 2004 to 2007 and as the Minister of Trade from 2007 to 2008.

== Early years and education ==
He was born on 14 October 1954 in Vladičin Han, SR Serbia, SFR Yugoslavia. He graduated from the University of Novi Sad Faculty of Law and later earned a PhD at the same institution.

== Professional career ==
Bubalo started his professional career in 1977 at Livnica "Kikinda", Kikinda based foundry. He headed the branch office in Beijing from 1994-2000, and held the position of Livnica Kikinda general manager from 2002-2004.

== Political career ==
From 2002 to 2008 Bubalo held several Ministerial positions as a member of Demokratska Stranka Srbije (DSS): Minister of Foreign Economic Relations (March–October 2004); Minister of Economy (October 20024-May 2007) and Minister of Trade (May 2007 - July 2008). From 2006-2007 he also oversighted the Ministry of Agriculture. In 2014 Bubalo was a victim of and populist Anti-Corruption battle initiated by A. Vucic. A trial in relation with the sale of state owned shares in Luka Beograd started in July 2014. He pleaded not guilty to all charges, denying allegations of power abuse. On 26 December 2017, Bubalo and other prosecuted officials were acquitted of all charges. In 2020 Bubalo filed a suit with an indemnity request.

Government offices
Preceded by Goran Pitić	Minister of Foreign Economic Relations of Serbia; 2004	Succeeded by Milan Parivodić
Preceded by Dragan Maršićanin	Minister of Economy of Serbia; 2004–2007	Succeeded by Mlađan Dinkić
Preceded by Bojan Dimitrijević	Minister of Trade of Serbia; 2007–2008	Succeeded by Slobodan Milosavljević
