= Ana Pešikan =

Serbian politician

- Ана Пешикан

Minister of Science and Technology
- In office 15 May 2007 – 7 July 2008
- Preceded by: Aleksandar Popović
- Succeeded by: Božidar Đelić

Personal details
- Born: Feketić, PR Serbia, FPR Yugoslavia (present-day Feketić, Republic of Serbia)
- Party: G17 Plus
- Education: Psychology at University of Belgrade
- Alma mater: University of Belgrade

Ana Pešikan (Serbian: Ана Пешикан; born Feketić, PR Serbia, FPR Yugoslavia) is a Serbian politician who served as the Minister of Science and Technology in the Government of Serbia from 2007 to 2008.

== Biography ==
Pešikan graduated from the Faculty of Philosophy, Department of Psychology, and received her MA and PhD degrees. She participated in over 30 projects of developmental and pedagogical psychology, she was UNICEF’s consultant for education, member of expert team for text books, member of the committee of the Fund for Young Talents. She is a lecturer of doctoral studies at the Belgrade Faculty of Philosophy and Faculty of Chemistry.

== Sources ==
- Profile of Ana Pešikan, Kapija, 22 June 2007. (in Serbian)

Government offices
Preceded by Aleksandar Popović	Minister of Science and Technology of Serbia; 2007 – 2008	Succeeded by Božidar Đelić
