= Žarko Korać =

Serbian psychologist and politician

- Жарко Кораћ
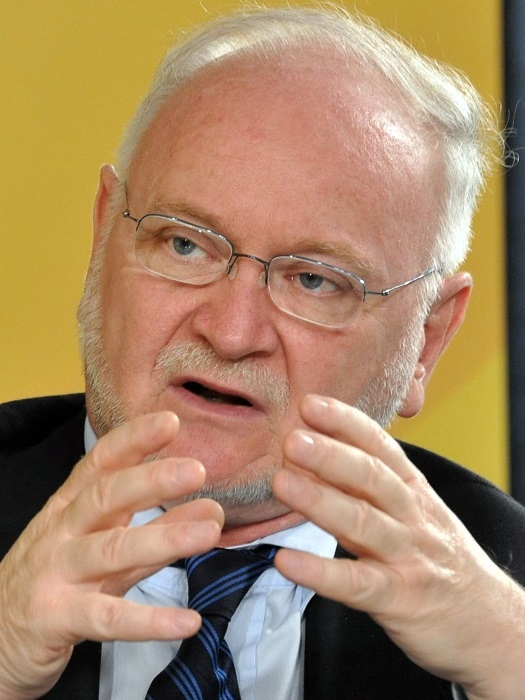
- Žarko Korać in 2010

Deputy Prime Minister of Serbia
- In office 25 January 2001 – 3 March 2004
- Prime Minister: Zoran Đinđić; Zoran Živković
- Preceded by: Spasoje Krunić
- Succeeded by: Miroljub Labus

Prime Minister of Serbia Acting
- In office 17 March 2003 – 18 March 2003
- Preceded by: Nebojša Čović (acting)
- Succeeded by: Zoran Živković

Vice President of the National Assembly of Serbia
- In office 23 July 2012 – 16 April 2014
- Prime Minister: Ivica Dačić
- Preceded by: Judita Popović
- Succeeded by: Gordana Čomić

Personal details
- Born: 9 March 1947 (age 79) Belgrade, PR Serbia, FPR Yugoslavia
- Party: GSS (1992–1996); SDP (2002–2003); SDU (1996–2002; 2003–2014)

Žarko Korać (Serbian Cyrillic: Жарко Кораћ; born 9 March 1947) is a Serbian psychologist and politician. He taught psychology at the University of Belgrade Faculty of Philosophy and is one of the founders and former president of the Social Democratic Union.

== Biography ==
He was Deputy Prime Minister in the Government of Serbia between 2001 and 2004, and briefly acting Prime Minister (17–18 March 2003), after Prime Minister Zoran Đinđić was assassinated.

Korać is a long time member of the Parliament of Serbia, being part of the LDP-led coalition since 2008.

After May 2012 elections, Korać was elected as Deputy Speaker in the Parliament of Serbia.
