= Božidar Đelić =

Serbian politician (born 1965)

- Божидар Ђелић
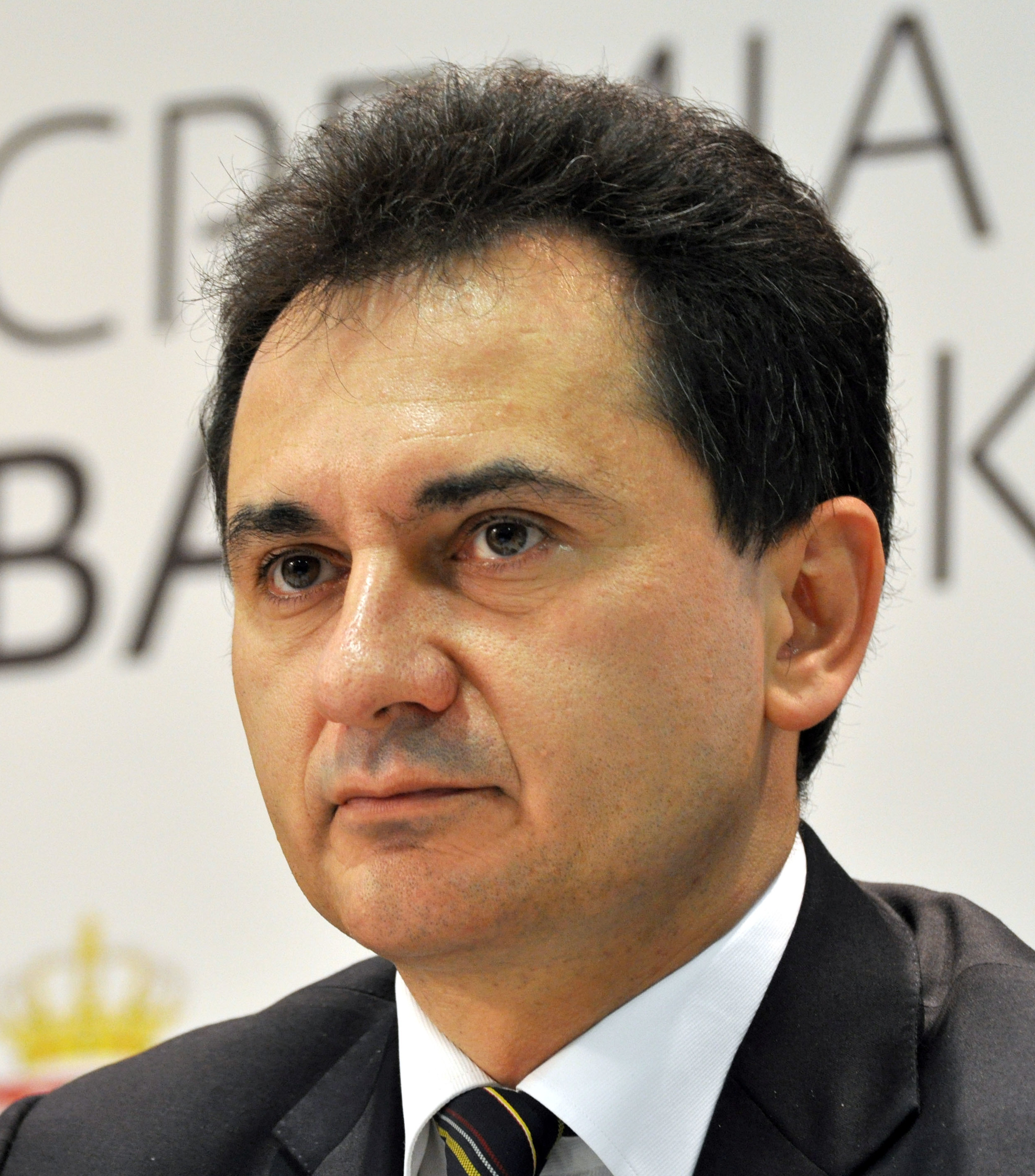
- Đelić in 2010

Deputy Prime Minister of Serbia
- In office 15 May 2007 – 9 December 2011
- Prime Minister: Vojislav Koštunica; Mirko Cvetković
- Preceded by: Ivana Dulić-Marković

Minister of Science and Technological Development
- In office 7 July 2008 – 14 March 2011
- Prime Minister: Mirko Cvetković
- Preceded by: Ana Pešikan
- Succeeded by: Žarko Obradović (Note: As Minister of Education due to merging of the ministries)

Minister of Finance and Economy
- In office 25 January 2001 – 3 March 2004
- Prime Minister: Zoran Đinđić; Zoran Živković
- Preceded by: Borislav Milačić (Note: Served as co-ministers); Ljubiša Jovanović; Bojan Dimitrijević
- Succeeded by: Mlađan Dinkić

Personal details
- Born: 1 April 1965 (age 61) Belgrade, SR Serbia, SFR Yugoslavia
- Party: DS (until 2020)
- Children: 2
- Education: HEC Paris; Sciences Po; EHESS; Harvard Business School; Harvard Kennedy School
- Profession: Economist
- Website: www.djelic.net

Božidar Đelić (Note: Serbian Cyrillic: Божидар Ђелић, pronounced [bɔ̌ʒidaːr dʑɛ̌ːlitɕ]) (born 1 April 1965) is a Serbian economist and former politician. A longtime member of the Democratic Party, he was highly positioned in politics of Serbia after the overthrow of Slobodan Milošević. He served as the Minister of Finance and Economy in the Government of Serbia from 2001 to 2004 and later as Deputy Prime Minister of Serbia and Minister of Science and Technological Development from 2007 to 2011.

== Early life and education ==
Đelić was born in Belgrade in 1965, an only child. His parents divorced soon after his birth and went abroad in search of better prospects, while he stayed behind in Belgrade where he was raised by his maternal grandparents. He later described his grandmother Mileva as the strongest figure in his childhood. When his grandparents died in 1973, he moved to Paris to live with his mother and stepfather in Paris. When her small business collapsed, Božidar helped earn his way by washing dishes and cleaning windows, while studying at the same time.

In 1980 and 1981, Đelić won the French national competitions (Lauréat du Concours général) for high-school students in geography and economics. He graduated from the SciencesPo (Institut d’Etudes Politiques) in 1987, as top 5% of a class of 800 students.

In 1987, he obtained HEC (Hautes Etudes Commerciales) diploma at "Jouy-en-Josas", where he specialized in strategy and finance. In 1988, he obtained MA in Economics (Diplôme d’Etudes Approfondies) at "Ecole des Hautes Etudes en Sciences Sociales", with thesis on the "effects of real exchange rate instability on growth in emerging countries".

With two scholarships given, in 1991 he graduated from the J.F. Kennedy School of Government, at Harvard University, where he obtained MPA (Master of Public Administration) title. Also, in the same year, he obtained MBA (Master of Business Administration) from the Harvard Business School in Boston, specialized in finance and marketing.

== Career ==
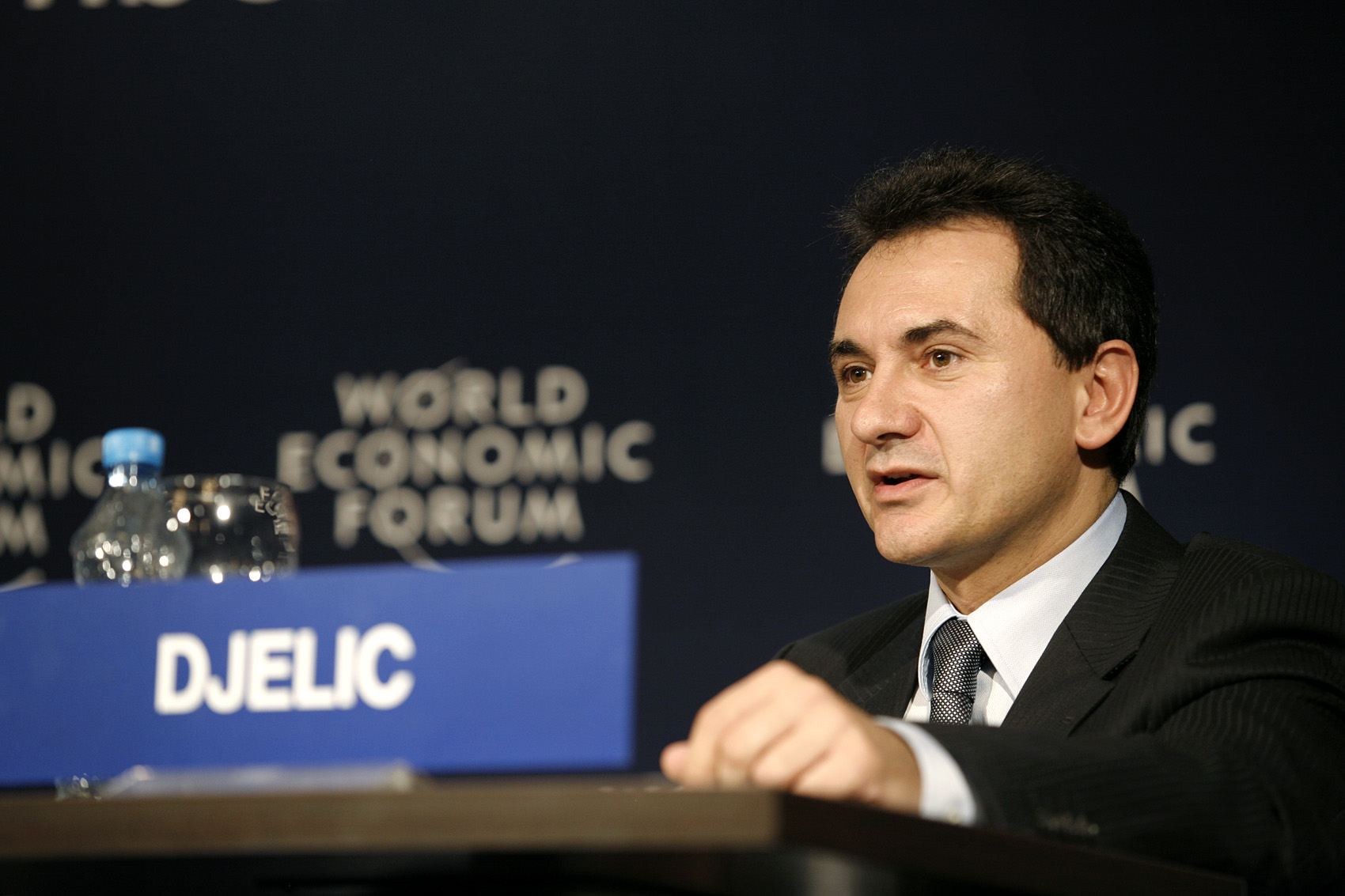
Đelić at World Economic Forum in 2008

In 2001, he was appointed the Minister of Finance and Economy in the Government of Serbia led by Zoran Đinđić. Đinđić was assassinated on 12 March 2003, and Zoran Živković took over the Government of Serbia.

In May 2004, he was appointed the member of the General Management Committee of French financial institution Crédit Agricole.

From 2007 to 2011, Đelić served as the Deputy Prime Minister of Serbia, as well as the Minister for Science and Technological Development from 2008 to 2011. During that period he was chief negotiator for Serbia's accession to the European Union. He was also the chief governor of Serbia in relation to the World Bank Group and Deputy Governor to the EBRD. In December 2011, he resigned from the governmental office, stating failure to get country's candidate status for EU accession.

In January 2014, Đelić joined the French investment bank Lazard based in Paris, France.

== Notes ==
Political offices
Preceded by Borislav Milačić; Ljubiša Jovanović; Bojan Dimitrijević (co-ministers)	Minister of Finance of Serbia; 2001–2004	Succeeded by Mlađan Dinkić
Preceded by Ivana Dulić-Marković	Deputy Prime Minister of Serbia; 2007–2011	Succeeded by
Preceded by Ana Pešikan	Minister of Science and Technological Development; 2008–2011	Succeeded by Žarko Obradović (Merged into Ministry of Education)
