= Ivana Dulić-Marković =

Serbian politician (born 1961)

Dr Ivana Dulić-Marković
- Ивана Дулић-Марковић
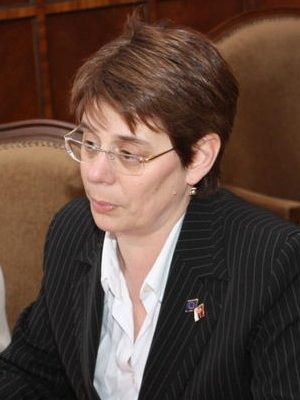

Deputy Prime Minister of Serbia
- In office 20 June 2006 – 9 November 2006
- Prime Minister: Vojislav Koštunica
- Preceded by: Miroljub Labus
- Succeeded by: Božidar Đelić

Minister of Agriculture, Forestry and Water Management
- In office 3 March 2004 – 19 June 2006
- Preceded by: Stojan Jevtić
- Succeeded by: Slobodan Milosavljević

Personal details
- Born: 13 June 1961 (age 65) Zagreb, PR Croatia, FPR Yugoslavia
- Party: G17 Plus
- Children: 2
- Education: Ph.D. of University of Belgrade

Ivana Dulić-Marković (Serbian Cyrillic: Ивана Дулић-Марковић, pronounced [ǐʋana dǔːlit͡ɕ mǎːrkoʋit͡ɕ]; born 13 June 1961) is a Serbian politician.

== Career ==
Dulić-Marković was the Serbian Minister of Agriculture, Forestry, and Water Management from 2004 to 2006. In June 2006 she was appointed the Deputy Prime Minister in the Government of Serbia replacing Miroljub Labus.

She is a member of the G17 Plus party. She graduated with a Ph.D. from Belgrade University in biotechnology in 1999, and was a teaching assistant at the faculty of biology. Outside her government career, she is a professor at the agricultural faculty at the University of Banja Luka.

== Personal life ==
She has two children by her late husband. She is an ethnic Croat.

Government offices
Preceded by Miroljub Labus	Deputy Prime Minister; 2006	Succeeded by Božidar Đelić
Preceded by Stojan Jevtić	Minister of Agriculture, Forestry and Water Management; 2004–2006	Succeeded by Slobodan Milosavljević
