= Gašo Knežević =

Serbian politician

- Гашо Кнежевић
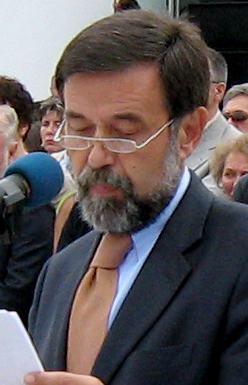

Minister of Education and Sports
- In office 25 January 2001 – 3 March 2004
- Preceded by: Himself; Mihajlo Jokić (Sports)
- Succeeded by: Ljiljana Čolić

Minister of Higher and High Education
- In office 24 October 2000 – 25 January 2001
- Preceded by: Jevrem Janjić
- Succeeded by: Himself (Merged into Ministry of Education and Sports)

Personal details
- Born: 15 September 1953 Belgrade, Serbia, SFR Yugoslavia
- Died: 14 March 2014 (aged 60) Belgrade, Serbia
- Party: Civic Alliance of Serbia
- Education: University of Belgrade Faculty of Law
- Alma mater: University of Belgrade
- Profession: Professor

Gašo Knežević (Serbian Cyrillic: Гашо Кнежевић; 15 September 1953 – 14 March 2014) was a Serbian law scholar and professor at the University of Belgrade's Law School. He served as the Minister of Education and Sports in the Government of Serbia from 2001 to 2004. He also served as the Minister of Higher and High Education in the transitional government from 2000 to 2001.

Knežević was a member and a high-ranking official of the Civic Alliance of Serbia. He died in March 2014.

Government offices
Preceded by Mihajlo Jokić	Minister of Education and Sports; 2001–2004	Succeeded by Ljiljana Čolić
