= Radojko Obradović =

Serbian politician

Radojko Obradović (born 1966) is a Vice-President of the Serbian National Assembly. He was appointed to this position in 2007. He is a long-standing MP for the Democratic Party of Serbia (DSS) and represents the DSS in coalition with New Serbia. He is also the President of the Political Committee of the DSS. In the Government of Serbia (2001-2004) he was the Deputy Minister for Construction and Urban Planning. He has a degree in construction engineering.
