= Ministry of Foreign Economic Relations (Serbia) =

Defunct Serbian government ministry

- Министарство за економске односе са иностранством Ministarstvo za ekonomske odnose sa inostranstvom

Ministry overview
- Formed: 11 February 1991
- Dissolved: 15 May 2007
- Superseding Ministry: Ministry of Economy and Regional Development
- Jurisdiction: Government of Serbia

The Ministry of Foreign Economic Relations of the Republic of Serbia (Serbian: Министарство за економске односе са иностранством / Ministarstvo za ekonomske odnose sa inostranstvom) was the ministry in the Government of Serbia which was in charge of foreign economic Relations of Serbia. The ministry was abolished on 15 May 2007.

== History ==
The ministry was established on 11 February 1991. It was abolished on 15 May 2007 when it merged into the Ministry of Economy and Regional Development. Also, the newly established Ministry of National Investment Plan (formally year later) took some of its jurisdictions.

== List of ministers ==
Minister	Image	Party	Term start	Term end	Lifespan
Slobodan Prohaska		Socialist Party of Serbia (SPS)	11 February 1991	23 December 1991	1943–
Srđan Savić		Socialist Party of Serbia (SPS)	23 December 1991	10 February 1993	
Radoslav Mitrović		Socialist Party of Serbia (SPS)	10 February 1993	7 September 1993	
Goran Pitić		Democratic Party (DS)	24 October 2000	3 March 2004	1961–
Predrag Bubalo		Democratic Party of Serbia (DSS)	3 March 2004	19 October 2004	1954–
Milan Parivodić		Democratic Party of Serbia (DSS)	19 October 2004	15 May 2007	1966–

== See also ==
- Ministry of Economy
