= Church property restitution in Serbia =

The Church property restitution in Serbia is governed by the 2006 Law (Serbian: Закон о враћању (реституцији) имовине црквама и верским заједницама). It addressed the reversal of the acts of consfication of church properties in the Socialist Federal Republic of Yugoslavia.
