= Bojan Dimitrijević (politician) =

Serbian economist and politician

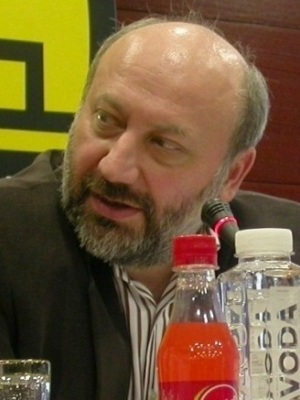
Bojan Dimitrijević

Bojan Dimitrijević (born 1963 in Gornji Milanovac, SR Serbia, SFR Yugoslavia) is a Serbian economist and politician.

He was Minister of Trade, Tourism and Services in the Serbian government formed by the coalition of DSS, G17+, and SPO-NS and headed by prime minister Vojislav Koštunica.

In 1996 Dimitrijević received a PhD from the University of Belgrade's Faculty of Economics. He was co-minister of finance in the transitional Government of Serbia in 2000. He was member of Vuk Drašković's Serbian Renewal Movement (SPO). During the 2005 breakup of SPO when a faction left the party to form Serbian Democratic Renewal Movement (SDPO), Dimitrijević did not take a side.

In mid November 2008, Dimitrijević announced his switch to the Serbian Progressive Party (SNS).

He is married and the father of one child.
