= Aleksandar Popović (politician) =

Serbian politician

Aleksandar Popović PhD
- Александар Поповић
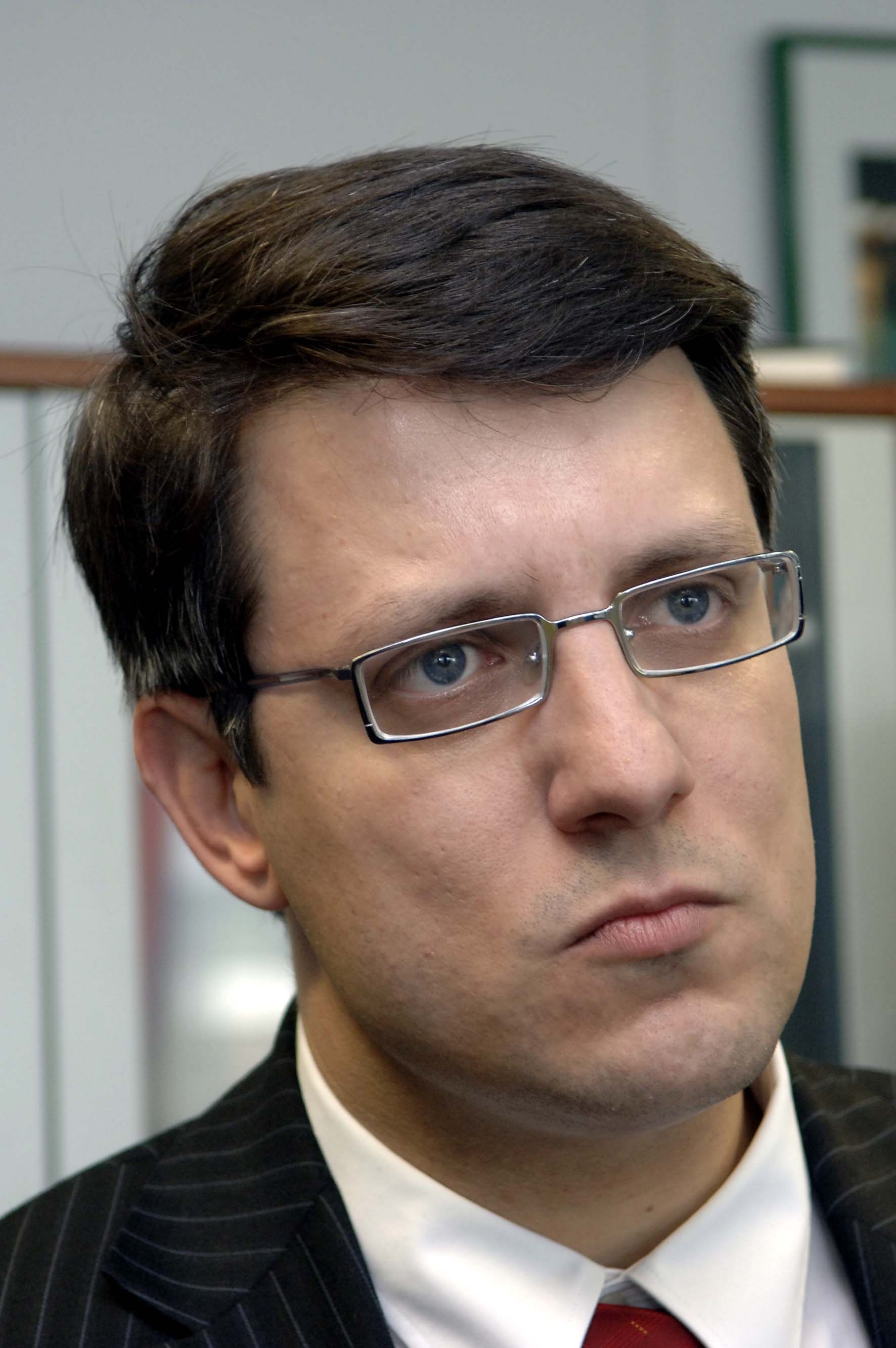
- Popović in 2005

Minister of Mining and Energy
- In office 15 May 2007 – 7 July 2008
- Preceded by: Radomir Naumov
- Succeeded by: Petar Škundrić

Minister of Science and Environmental Protection
- In office 3 March 2004 – 15 May 2007
- Preceded by: Dragan Domazet (Science); Anđelka Mihajlov (Natural Resources and Environmental Protection)
- Succeeded by: Ana Pešikan

Personal details
- Born: 20 October 1971 (age 55) Belgrade, SFR Yugoslavia
- Party: Democratic Party of Serbia
- Education: Florida State University; University of Belgrade
- Occupation: Politician
- Profession: Athlete, professor

Aleksandar Popović (Serbian Cyrillic: Александар Поповић, pronounced [aleksǎːndar pǒpoʋit͜ɕ] or [alěksaːndar], born 20 October 1971) is a Serbian politician and university professor. He served as the Minister of Energy and Mining from 2007 to 2008, and as the Minister of Science and Environmental Protection from 2004 to 2007. Before becoming a politician, Popović was a sprinter who competed internationally throughout 1990s.

== Education ==
Internationally educated, Popović completed elementary school in Belgrade before moving to Moscow where he finished high school. Returning home to complete college, he obtained a degree from University of Belgrade's Faculty of Chemistry. During the mid-1990s he moved abroad again, this time to Tallahassee, in Florida, United States, where in 1996 he earned his MA from Florida State University. Finally in 2002, he added a PhD to his academic resume from Faculty of Chemistry in Belgrade, where he currently works as a full professor.

== Athletic career ==
Popović made his international debut at the 1990 World Junior Championships in Athletics, where he ran in Heat 6 of the men's 100 meters as well as in Heat 5 of the men's 200 meters. In neither distance did he make it into the semifinals. When he moved to Moscow, he continued training with Dynamo Sports Club. When he studied for his master's degree at Florida State, he trained with the varsity team but was not NCAA eligible, so he ran unattached at college track meets. Upon returning to Yugoslavia from his graduate studies in the United States, he was called up as a member of Yugoslavia's 4 × 400 metres relay team for the 1997 Mediterranean Games, which placed last at the competition. His competitive sprinting career ended in 1999 with a meniscus injury. His personal record in the 200 meters was 21.73 seconds with no wind aid.

== Political career ==
Popović was the Vice-president of Democratic Party of Serbia between 2003 and 2016. He served as the Minister of Energy and Mining and previously Minister of Science and Environmental Protection in both Koštunica's Governments between 2004 and 2008. He was DSS candidate for the Belgrade City Mayor position in both 2008 Serbian local elections and 2012 Serbian local elections. He was nominated as Democratic Party of Serbia's candidate in the 2017 Serbian presidential election.

== Political positions ==
=== Economic policy ===
During a 2017 presidential campaign stop in Niš, Popović called for reducing the value-added tax rates on all domestic production in underdeveloped parts of Serbia. He also called for a progressive tax regarding those with higher incomes, however unlike the typical progressive tax model, Popović told his campaign audience in Sremska Mitrovica that the poorest should not pay taxes at all.

Without mentioning his name, Popović said that Minister of Finance Dušan Vujović is "an excellent professional", but criticized him on the deadlines given to Serbian MPs on assessing budget proposals. Popović claimed that such deadlines were meant to satisfy the conveniences of the IMF as opposed to the interests of Serbia.

=== Foreign policy ===
==== European Union ====
Popović is a long-time eurosceptic. In an interview with Večernje novosti on January 24, 2017, Popović stated that he was against the Brussels Agreement. He suggested that even the termination of the Brussels Agreement should not mean an end to diplomatic relations with the European Union, but that Serbia in that case should still abstain from EU membership. During a visit in Smederevo during his presidential campaign, Popović told the press that the European Union would try to prevent Chinese investments into the Serbian metallurgical industry.

Government offices
Preceded by Dragan Domazet (Science); Anđelka Mihajlov (Natural Resources and Environmental Protection)	Minister of Science and Environmental Protection of Serbia; 2004 – 2007	Succeeded by Ana Pešikan (Science and Technology); Saša Dragin (Ecology)
Preceded by Radomir Naumov	Minister of Mining and Energy of Serbia; 2007 – 2008	Succeeded by Petar Škundrić
