= Nataša Mićić =

Serbian politician

- Наташа Мићић
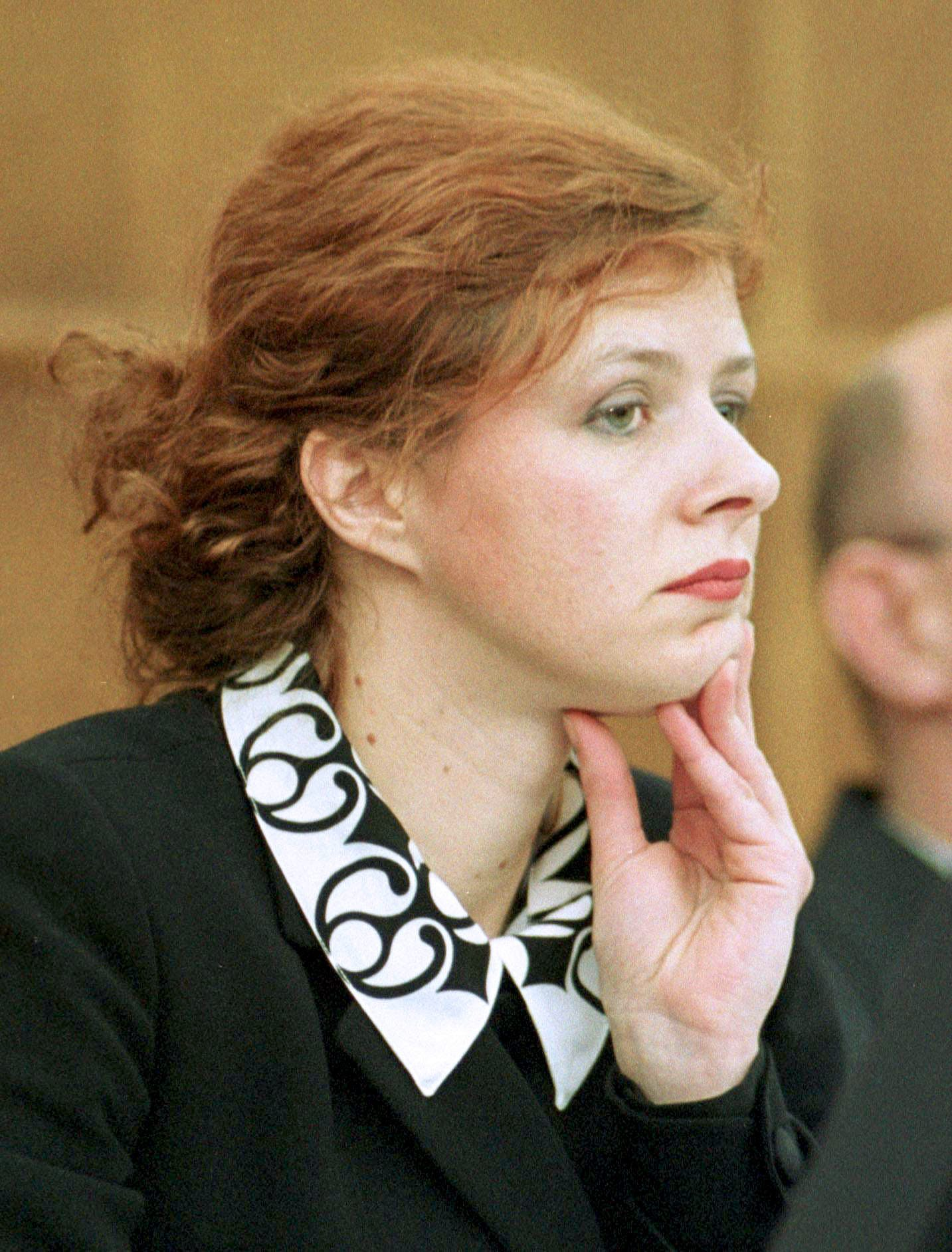
- Mićić in 2001

Acting President of Serbia
- In office 29 December 2002 – 27 January 2004
- Prime Minister: Zoran Đinđić; Nebojša Čović (acting); Zoran Živković
- Preceded by: Milan Milutinović
- Succeeded by: Dragan Maršićanin (acting)

President of the National Assembly of Serbia
- In office 6 December 2001 – 27 January 2004
- Preceded by: Dragan Maršićanin
- Succeeded by: Dragan Maršićanin

Personal details
- Born: 2 November 1965 (age 60) Titovo Užice, SR Serbia, SFR Yugoslavia
- Party: GSS (1996–2007); LDP (2007–present)
- Spouse: Miodrag Mićić
- Children: 1
- Profession: Lawyer

Nataša Mićić (Serbian Cyrillic: Наташа Мићић; née Jovanović; born 2 November 1965) is a Serbian lawyer and politician who served as the president of the National Assembly of Serbia from 2001 to 2004 and as the acting president of Serbia from 2002 to 2004.

Mićić graduated from the University of Belgrade's Law School and found employment as a clerk at the Užice Municipal Court during the early 1990s. She left the post in 1998 to pursue a career as a lawyer. Even though she was almost 33 at the time, she ended up as one of the founders of the Otpor! student movement, acting as their spokesperson and legal counsel.

== Political career ==
Mićić's law and political careers frequently overlapped. She became a GSS member in 1996 while still employed at Užice court. By the time Slobodan Milošević was overthrown in the autumn of 2000, Mićić was a high-ranking GSS official (within a large DOS coalition at the time). In late December 2000, DOS overwhelmingly won the parliamentary elections and GSS members were allocated their share of political posts. Nataša Mićić became the parliamentary vice-president in January 2001 – deputy to Dragan Maršićanin from Democratic Party of Serbia (DSS).

=== Parliamentary President (Speaker) 2001–2003 ===
After Dragan Maršićanin resigned his post on 6 December 2001 as a result of the growing conflict between DSS MPs and the remaining DOS MPs, Mićić immediately replaced him as the president of National Assembly and the chairman of its Constitutional Committee.

As Milan Milutinović's mandate as the President of Serbia expired, and two presidential elections were voided because turnout fell short of required 50%, she became the acting President of Serbia on 30 December 2002, with a constitutional obligation to call another election within 60 days of taking over the acting post. She did not do so in the required period, leading to a chorus of criticism.

Following the assassination of Zoran Đinđić on 12 March 2003, a state of emergency was immediately declared under her command.

By May of the same year, the situation had calmed and the state of emergency was lifted. For Mićić, however, the fall of 2003 would become a crucial period in her political career.

Firstly, on 17 September 2003, over six months after the required constitutional period expired, she finally announced a 16 November date for a third attempt at electing a President for Serbia. She then experienced continuous parliamentary pressure because of the voting scandal involving DOS MP Neda Arnerić.

On 16 October 2003 after the ruling DOS coalition was left without a parliamentary majority for the first time in almost three years, a motion for a no-confidence vote proceeding started for the parliamentary president Nataša Mićić. The parliamentary discussion on this issue finished on 29 October 2003, but the actual non-confidence vote was postponed for a fortnight.

In the end, it proved unnecessary, as on 13 November 2003, just three days before the presidential elections that would later be void again because of low turnout, Mićić dissolved parliament and called for parliamentary elections on 28 December 2003.

=== Back in opposition ===
The GSS entered the new parliamentary elections on the Democratic Party (DS) ballot, and was given 2 seats out of the total 31 that the DS list got.

Nataša Mićić became one of GSS MPs, while Goran Svilanović got the other seat. In December 2004, she was elected to be GSS president. After the merger of the Civic Alliance of Serbia into the Liberal Democratic Party in 2007, she became the vice-president of the Liberal Democratic Party.

== Personal life ==
Nataša Mićić is married to Miodrag Mićić, member of GSS municipal board in Užice.

In late March 2006, her husband was in the news for phoning and reportedly verbally threatening journalist Nenad Kovačević from the Danas daily. Kovačević revealed Miodrag Mićić called him up on 30 March 2006, reportedly angry about Kovačević's piece in the previous day's issue of Danas that references the fact that six Serbian Assembly Members of Parliament from Užice declared their personal monthly income to be over RSD1.2 million (~€15,000). Nobody was mentioned by name but Miodrag Mićić apparently thought it obvious the article alludes to him and his wife, and allegedly decided to menace Kovačević over the phone by reportedly proclaiming: "If anything happens to my home, my wife or my child, the same will happen to your family and your kids; you singled out my home and my family by writing this article".

While admitting to calling up Kovačević and "reacting hastily after getting into an argument [with the journalist]", Miodrag Mićić denied using the exact words ascribed to him.

Government offices
Preceded by Milan Milutinović	President of Serbia; Acting; 2002–2004	Succeeded by Dragan Maršićanin (Acting)
Party political offices
Preceded by Goran Svilanović	President of the Civic Alliance of Serbia; 2004–2007	Succeeded by Position abolished
