= Dragan Maršićanin =

Serbian politician

- Драган Маршићанин
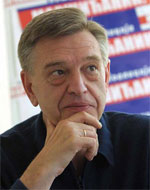
- Maršićanin in 2004

President of the National Assembly of Serbia
- In office 22 January 2001 – 6 December 2001
- Preceded by: Dragan Tomić
- Succeeded by: Nataša Mićić
- In office 4 February 2004 – 3 March 2004
- Preceded by: Nataša Mićić
- Succeeded by: Predrag Marković

President of Serbia
- Acting
- In office 4 February 2004 – 3 March 2004
- Prime Minister: Zoran Živković
- Preceded by: Nataša Mićić (acting)
- Succeeded by: Vojislav Mihailović (acting)

Minister of Economy
- In office 3 March 2004 – 10 May 2004
- Preceded by: Office established (Note: Split from Ministry of Finance and Economy)
- Succeeded by: Zora Simović (acting); Predrag Bubalo

Serbian Ambassador to Switzerland
- In office 4 July 2004 – 27 January 2009
- Succeeded by: Milan St. Protić

Personal details
- Born: 26 January 1950 (age 76) Belgrade, PR Serbia, FPR Yugoslavia
- Party: DS (1990–1992); DSS/NDSS (1992–present)
- Occupation: Politician
- Profession: Economist

Dragan Maršićanin (Serbian Cyrillic: Драган Маршићанин; born 26 January 1950) is a Serbian economist and politician. He was the ambassador of Serbia to Switzerland from 2004 to 2009. He served as the Minister of Economy in 2004, only to leave it in order to run for president in 2004. He later resigned from the position and was replaced by Predrag Bubalo in October 2004.

In the 2004 Serbian presidential election Maršićanin finished 4th with 13.3% of the vote.

He was the President of the National Assembly of Serbia in 2001 and in 2004, and the interim acting President of Serbia between 4 February and 3 March 2004.

Maršićanin graduated from the University of Belgrade Faculty of Economics. Following university studies, he worked for companies such as Elektron, Novi Kolektiv and Belgrade Water Utility Company. He has been a member of the Democratic Party of Serbia since the party's founding. For a time he was the secretary of party, and currently is its vice-president. He served as chairman of Vračar municipality in Belgrade until 1996.

== See also ==
- List of Ambassadors from Serbia

== Notes ==
Government offices
Preceded by Nataša Mićić; Acting	President of Serbia; Acting; 2004	Succeeded by Vojislav Mihailović; Acting
Preceded by Dragan Tomić	President of the National Assembly of Serbia; 2001	Succeeded by Nataša Mićić
Preceded by Nataša Mićić	President of the National Assembly of Serbia; 2004	Succeeded by Predrag Marković
