= Vojislav Koštunica =

Serbian politician (born 1944)

Dr. iur. Vojislav Koštunica
- Војислав Коштуница
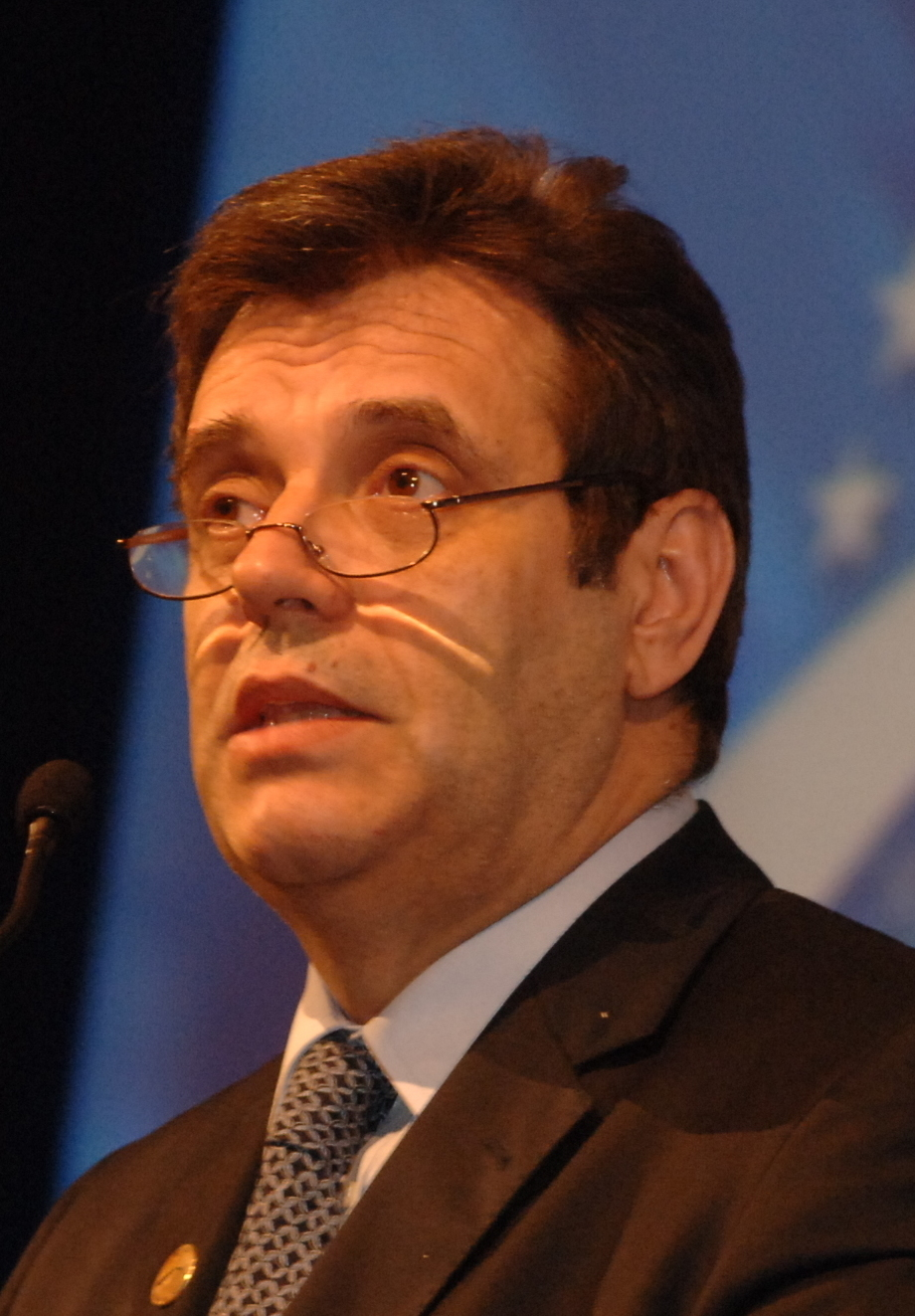
- Koštunica in 2006

Prime Minister of Serbia
- In office 4 March 2004 – 7 July 2008
- President: Dragan Maršićanin (acting); Vojislav Mihailović (acting); Predrag Marković (acting); Boris Tadić
- Deputy: Miroljub Labus; Ivana Dulić-Marković; Božidar Đelić
- Preceded by: Zoran Živković
- Succeeded by: Mirko Cvetković

President of FR Yugoslavia
- In office 7 October 2000 – 7 March 2003
- Prime Minister: Momir Bulatović; Zoran Žižić; Dragiša Pešić
- Preceded by: Slobodan Milošević
- Succeeded by: Svetozar Marović (as President of Serbia and Montenegro)

Personal details
- Born: 24 March 1944 (age 82) Belgrade, German-occupied Serbia
- Party: DS (1990–1992); DSS (1992–2014)
- Spouses: Zorica Radović (m. 1976; died 2015) Ljiljana Lazarević (m. 2018)
- Education: University of Belgrade
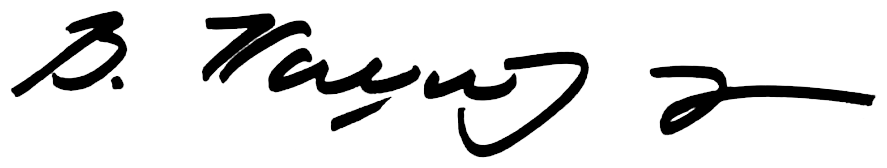
- Signature

Vojislav Koštunica (Note: Serbian Cyrillic: Војислав Коштуница, pronounced [ʋǒjislaʋ koʃtǔnit͡sa]) (born 24 March 1944) is a Serbian former politician who served as the last president of FR Yugoslavia from 2000 to 2003 and as the prime minister of Serbia from 2004 to 2008.

Koštunica won the 2000 Yugoslav presidential election as a candidate of a broad alliance Democratic Opposition of Serbia (DOS), which led to the overthrow of Slobodan Milošević and the withdrawal of international sanctions against Yugoslavia. He strictly opposed cooperation with the International Criminal Tribunal for the former Yugoslavia (ICTY) and his party left the coalition government in protest at the decision to extradite Slobodan Milošević to the ICTY. After the 2003 Serbian parliamentary election, the first elections after the dissolution of DOS and assassination of Prime Minister Zoran Đinđić, Koštunica formed a minority government with the support of Milošević's Socialist Party of Serbia and became the head of government. He was one of the crucial figures in the adoption of the first constitution of an independent Serbia, as well as for declaring Serbia a neutral country. During his second government (2007–2008), he opposed signing the Stabilisation and Association Agreement (SAA) with the European Union, leading to the fall of the government after a year and the early elections won by pro-European parties.

He was one of the founders and the first president of the Democratic Party of Serbia from its creation in 1992 until 19 March 2014, when he resigned as party president and retired from active politics after his party failed to reach the 5% threshold to enter the Parliament on March 16 elections for the first time in its history. In October 2014, he left the party after disagreements with the new party leadership over what he saw as their abandonment of the policy of political neutrality. In November 2014, he was one of the founders of the right-wing eurosceptic "Statehood Movement of Serbia".

== Early life and education ==
Koštunica was born on 24 March 1944 in his family home in Belgrade, at the time the capital of German-occupied Serbia. As a youth he went by the nickname 'Voja'. His paternal family descends from Jovan Damjanović, who originated from the village of Koštunići. He was educated in Belgrade, where he finished elementary school, and graduated from the Second Belgrade High School in 1962. Koštunica enrolled in the University of Belgrade's Faculty of Law the same year, graduating in 1966. He earned his master's degree in 1970 and his Ph.D. in 1974 with his thesis Institutionalized Opposition in the Political System of Capitalism.

Koštunica was an assistant at the faculty from 1970 until 1974, when he left due to a political purge at the university for criticising the communist regime of Josip Broz Tito. After his expulsion, Koštunica worked at the Institute of Social Sciences, and from 1981 at the Institute for Philosophy and Social Theory, where he engaged in the protection of human rights, specifically in the defence of freedom of thought and expression.

== Political career ==
Koštunica was a founding member of the Democratic Party (DS) in 1989. He left the Democratic Party in 1992 over opposing views in leadership and formed the Democratic Party of Serbia.

=== President of Yugoslavia (2000–03) ===
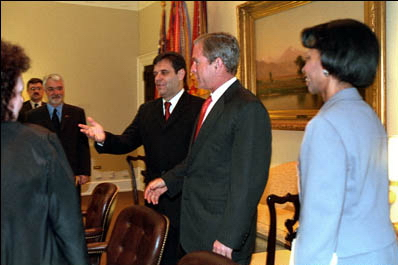
President George W. Bush greets Vojislav Koštunica, then President of Yugoslavia, in the White House.

Supported by both nationalists and liberals, the Democratic Opposition of Serbia backed him in the 2000 presidential election against incumbent Slobodan Milošević. Koštunica received 50.2 percent of the vote in the first round of voting, just a few thousand votes over the threshold needed to win outright. Milošević disputed the results of the first round, claiming that Koštunica had only received 49 percent of the vote and a runoff was required. The Otpor movement, a student-led movement to oust Milošević and install free and fair elections, organized a protest where thousands of Serbians participated in strikes and took over the Belgrade capital and forced Milošević to accept the results and step down as president. Koštunica then assumed the presidency. He was the last president of the Federal Republic of Yugoslavia. Koštunica opposed the extradition of his predecessor, to the Hague Tribunal, and voiced opposition to the court.

=== Prime Minister of Serbia (2004–08) ===
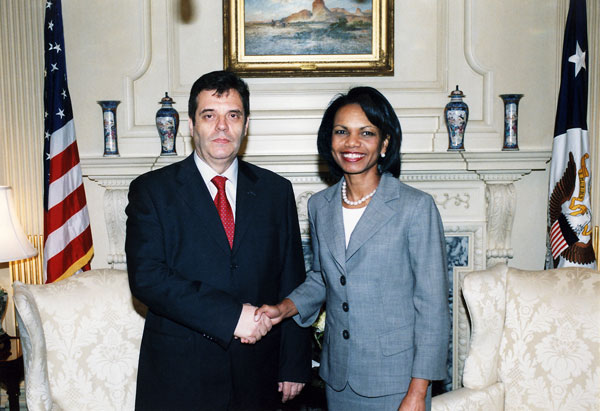
With Secretary Rice in Washington, D.C., on 12 July 2006.

Koštunica became prime minister in March 2004 as the head of the new minority government, albeit with the support of the Socialist Party of Serbia.

Serbian parliamentary elections in January 2007 were inconclusive. On 15 May 2007, Koštunica agreed to form a fragile coalition government with Boris Tadić, with Koštunica continuing his role as Prime Minister and Tadić's party receiving 13 of 25 cabinet posts.

On 8 March 2008, Koštunica called for new elections on 11 May, after the collapse of his party's coalition with the Democratic Party over relations with the European Union and Kosovo's unilateral declaration of independence. Pro-EU candidate Boris Tadić and his Democratic Party wound up winning the parliamentary elections and on July 7, a coalition between the Democrats and the Socialist Party was formed with Mirko Cvetković succeeding Koštunica as Prime Minister.

== Political positions ==
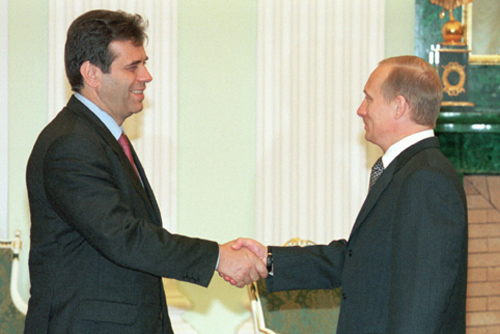
With Vladimir Putin in the Kremlin on 27 October 2000.

Koštunica is a conservative politician with strong anti-communist views but also critical of the West, namely the United States and the European Union. In an interview with German weekly news magazine Der Spiegel, Koštunica stated he is "fairly close to de Gaulle", in his views.

Since his retirement, Koštunica has kept most of his personal life private, rarely making public appearances. However, on March 15, 2025, he was seen attending the largest protest in Serbia's history.

=== On Kosovo ===
On 21 February 2008, following Kosovo's declaration of independence, Koštunica made an emotional speech in Belgrade, which included the following:

Dear citizens of Serbia, Serbia! What is Kosovo? Where is Kosovo? Whose is Kosovo? Is there anyone among us who is not from Kosovo? Is there anyone among us who thinks that Kosovo does not belong to us? Kosovo – that's Serbia's first name. Kosovo belongs to Serbia. Kosovo belongs to the Serbian people. That's how it has been for ever. That's how it's going to be for ever. There is no force, no threat, and no punishment big and hideous enough for any Serb, at any time, to say anything different but, Kosovo is Serbia! Never will anyone hear from us that the Patriarchate of Peć does not belong to us, that Visoki Dečani and Gračanica are not ours! That the place where we were born is not ours; we and our state and our church and everything that makes us what we are today! If we as Serbs renounce Serbianhood, our origin, our Kosovo, our ancestors and our history – then, who are we Serbs? What is our name then?

Buses took thousands of supporters to the rally; some protestors then attacked embassies and looted shops.

On 25 February 2008, Koštunica demanded that the United States rescind its recognition of Kosovo, warning that "there will be no stability until the fake state" is annulled.

=== On the European Union ===
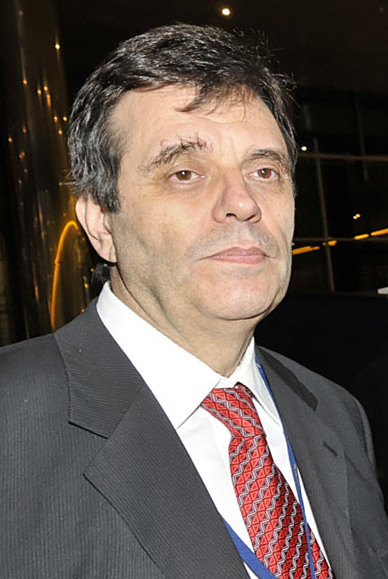
Koštunica in 2009

On 4 April 2008, Koštunica stated that European Union membership was no longer on the agenda for Serbia. He stated that before EU integration could continue, Serbia and the EU must discuss the matter of Serbia's territorial integrity.

He stated that Serbia must not by any means sign the Stabilisation and Association Agreement, which he referred to as "Solana's agreement".

On 21 April 2008, Koštunica said that the SAA was in the interests of Olli Rehn and Javier Solana and not in Serbia's national interests. He also said that "the NATO pact cannot claim that Serbia recognised Kosovo's independence with that signature." and that "the only thing the NATO pact will be able to claim is that individual parties signed Solana's agreement."

On 27 April 2008, he said that anyone who signed the SAA on behalf of Serbia would become an accomplice to tearing Serbia apart. He also implied there is a cover-up of something in the agreement by saying: "I am convinced every Serbian sees that things are being covered up, and that there is something seriously amiss with the Solana agreement." and he asked "who in Serbia dares to ignore these facts and conceal the real goal of Solana's agreement."

On 28 April 2008, he said that "the signature will not be valid for Serbia and whoever signs the SAA will have to assume responsibility for such an act".

On 1 May 2008, Koštunica said that Russian Foreign Minister Sergey Lavrov was right when he said that the SAA should have been signed before Kosovo's unilateral declaration of independence and its recognition by 18 EU member states at the time. One day later on 2 May 2008 he vowed to annul the agreement after the election, calling it "a trick", "Solana's agreement" and "the Tadić-Đelić SAA signature". He said he refers to the act of signing of the SAA as anti-Constitutional and anti-state that leads to the breakup of Serbia. A spokesperson of Koštunica's Democratic Party of Serbia stated that Tadić was putting a seal of Judas of his party coalition to the Solana Agreement by signing it. On 4 May he called the document "a forgery and a trick".

== Awards ==
- Knight Grand Cross with Collar of the Order of Merit of the Italian Republic, 2002
- Order of Saint Sergius of Radonezh, 2005
- Order of the Republika Srpska, 2012

== Bibliography ==
=== Books ===
- Koštunica, Vojislav (2002). Ugrožena sloboda. Institut za filozofiju i društvenu teoriju / Filip Višnjić, Biblioteka "Fronesis", Belgrade. ISBN 978-86-7363-317-6.
- Vojislav Koštunica, Politički sistem kapitalizma i opozicija, Institut društvenih nauka, Belgrade, 1977
- Vojislav Koštunica, Kosta Čavoški, Stranački pluralizam ili monizam Društveni pokreti i politički sistem u Jugoslaviji 1944-1949, Institut društvenih nauka, Belgrade, 1983
- Vojislav Koštunica, Kosta Čavoški, Stranački pluralizam ili monizam Posleratna opozicija - obnova i zatiranje, Privredno-pravni priručnik, Belgrade, 1990
- Vojislav Koštunica, Kosta Čavoški, Party Pluralism or Monism Social Movements and the Political System in Yugoslavia 1944-1949, East European Monographs, Colorado, 1985
- Vojislav Koštunica, Između sile i prava, Kosovski zapisi, Hrišćanska misao, biblioteka Svečanik, Belgrade-Valjevo-Srbinje, 2000
- Koštunica, Vojislav (2008). Odbrana Kosova. Filip Višnjić, biblioteka "Posebna izdanja", Belgrade. ISBN 978-86-7363-585-9.
- Vojislav Koštunica, Zašto Srbija, a ne Evropska unija, Belgrade, 2012.

=== Selected articles ===
- Vojislav Koštunica, "Mogućnosti demokratije u Srbiji" - Filozofija i društvo (Institut za filozofiju i društvenu teoriju, Belgrade, editor: Svetozar Stojanović; 1997), no. XII. pp. 29-.
- Vojislav Koštunica, "Postkomunizam i problem demokratije" - Filozofija i društvo (Institut za filozofiju i društvenu teoriju, Belgrade, editor: Svetozar Stojanović; 1996), no. IX-X. pp. 253-.
- Vojislav Koštunica, "Politika i elite", - Ideje (1970), no. 5. pp. 19–27.
- Vojislav Koštunica, "Opšta deklaracija i osnovna prava", - Jugoslovenska revija za međunarodno pravo (Jugoslovensko udruženje za međunarodno pravo, Belgrade; 1989), no. 1-2. pp. 23–36.
- Vojislav Koštunica, "Alternativne ideje o socijalizmu u Jugoslaviji 1945-1947", - Filozofija i društvo (IFDT, Belgrade; 1989), no. 2, pp. -.
- Vojislav Koštunica, "Postkomunizam i problem demokratije", - Filozofija i društvo (IFDT, Belgrade, editor: dr Svetozar Stojanović; 1996), no. IX-X. pp. 253–263.
- Vojislav Koštunica, "Mogućnosti demokratije u Srbiji", - Filozofija i društvo (IFDT, Belgrade, editor: dr Svetozar Stojanović; 1997), no. 12. pp. 29–40.
- Vojislav Koštunica, "Neki problemi učešća federalnih jedinica u strukturi i funkcionisanju federacije", - Arhiv za pravne i društvene nauke (1973), no. 2-3. pp. 431–445.
- Vojislav Koštunica, "Poreklo institucionalizovane opozicije u SAD", - Arhiv za pravne i društvene nauke (Savez udruženja pravnika Jugoslavije, Belgrade; 1975), no. 3. pp. 417–433.
- Vojislav Koštunica, "Nastanak institucionalizovane opozicije u Velikoj noitaniji", - Arhiv za pravne i društvene nauke (Savez udruženja pravnika Jugoslavije, Belgrade; 1976), no. 3. pp. 423–440.
- Vojislav Koštunica, "Ruso i problem vladavine opšte volje", - Theoria (Filozofsko društvo Srbije, Belgrade; 1978), no. 3-4. pp. 41–49.
- Vojislav Koštunica, "Problem tiranije većine u političkoj filozofiji Aleksisa de Tokvila", - Filozofske studije (Filozofsko društvo Srbije, Belgrade; ). (1978). pp. 145.–204.
- Vojislav Koštunica, "Angloamerička pravna tradicija i ideja vladavine prava", - Arhiv za pravne i društvene promene (Savez udruženja pravnika Jugoslavije, Belgrade; 1981), no. 2. pp. 251–268.
- Vojislav Koštunica, "DŽon Lok i ideja vlade koja počiva na saglasnosti", - Filozofske studije (Filozofsko društvo Srbije, Belgrade;). (1982). pp. 35.–57.
- Vojislav Koštunica, "Politički sistem i osnovna prava", - Theoria (Filozofsko društvo Srbije, Belgrade; 1987), no. 1-2. pp. 53–62.
- Vojislav Koštunica, "Novija shvatanja o federalizmu u političkoj nauci" - Federalizam i nacionalno pitanje (Savez udruženja za političke nauke, Belgrade), (1971). pp. 289.–295.
- Vojislav Koštunica, "Opozicija i demokratija" - O demokratiji, (Draganić, Belgrade), (1995). pp. 120.–128.
- Vojislav Koštunica, "Uloga ustavnog sudstva; uporednopravni aspekt" - Ustavnost i zakonitost (Institut društvenih nauka, Belgrade), (1976). pp. 247.–260.
- Vojislav Koštunica, "Teorije revolucije i savremena sociologija" - Ogledi iz sociologije društvenog razvoja (Institut za sociološka istraživanja Filozofskog fakulteta u Belgradeu, Belgrade), (1981). pp. 38.–59.
- Vojislav Koštunica, "Srpska prevodna književnost u oblasti političke teorije do Prvog svetskog rata" - pp. -.
- Vojislav Koštunica, "Ustav, sloboda udruživanja i političke stranke" - Dva veka savremene ustavnosti (SANU, Belgrade), (1990). pp. 325.–340.
- Vojislav Koštunica, "Deklaracija iz 1789. i ljudska prava" - Sloboda, jednakost, noatstvo. Francuska revolucija i savremenost (Institut za evropske studije, Belgrade), (1990). pp. 181.–190.
- Vojislav Koštunica, "Ustavnopravni razvoj Jugoslavije između dva rata i pravna drzava" - Pravna država (Institut za sociološka i kriminološka istraživanja, Belgrade), (1991). pp. 37.–47.
- Vojislav Koštunica, "Načelo jednoglasnosti i jugoslovenski federalizam" - Potrebe društvenog razvoja (SANU, Belgrade), (1991). pp. 387.–390.
- Vojislav Koštunica. "The constitution and the federal State" - Jugoslavija. A Fractured federalism (The Wilson Center Press. Washington, editor: -{Dennison Rusinow}-). (1988). pp. 78.–92.

== See also ==
- Democratic Party of Serbia
- Cabinet of Vojislav Koštunica (2004–2007)
- Cabinet of Vojislav Koštunica II (2007–2008)

== Notes ==
Government offices
Preceded by Slobodan Milošević	President of Yugoslavia; 2000–2003	Succeeded by Svetozar Marović as President of Serbia and Montenegro
Preceded by Zoran Živković	Prime Minister of Serbia; 2004–2008	Succeeded by Mirko Cvetković
Party political offices
Preceded by Post established	Leader of the Democratic Party of Serbia; 1992–2014	Succeeded by Aleksandar Popović (Acting)
