= Stevan Marjanov =

Serbian politician

Stevan Marjanov (Serbian Cyrillic: Стефан Марјанов; born 1939) is a Serbian politician. He served in the Vojvodina provincial assembly from 1997 to 2004 and has held high municipal office in Titel. Initially a member of the far-right Serbian Radical Party (SRS), Marjanov later aligned with the predominantly left-wing Vojvodina Coalition (KV).

== Private career ==
Marjanov has alternately described himself as an entrepreneur and a worker.

== Politician ==
=== The 1990s ===
During the 1990s, Serbia's political culture was dominated by the authoritarian rule of Slobodan Milošević and the Socialist Party of Serbia (SPS).

Marjanov began his political career as a member of the Serbian Radical Party. He appeared in the twenty-third position on the party's electoral list for the Zrenjanin division in the 1993 Serbian parliamentary election; the list won four seats, and he was not given a mandate. (From 1992 to 2000, Serbia's electoral law stipulated that one-third of parliamentary mandates would be assigned to candidates from successful lists in numerical order, while the remaining two-thirds would be distributed amongst other candidates at the discretion of the sponsoring parties. Marjanov could have been given a mandate despite his list position, although in the event he was not.)

Marjanov was first elected to the provincial assembly in the 1996 Vojvodina provincial election, winning in the Titel constituency as a Radical Party candidate. The Socialist Party of Serbia (SPS) won a majority victory in this election, and the Radicals, with seven seats in total, served in opposition.

The provincial election took place concurrently with the 1996 Serbian local elections. In Titel, the local election did not produce a clear winner: both the Socialists and the Zajedno coalition won eight seats, while the Radicals won six, and other parties won the remaining three seats. When the new assembly convened, the six elected Radical members broke away from the party and formed their own organization, joining with the Zajedno group to establish a new local coalition government. Marjanov was part of the local exodus from the Radicals; when the new administration was formed, he was named as president of the assembly's executive committee, making him effectively the first minister in the local government.

On 10 July 1998, the Serbian government controversially suspended Titel's municipal government and appointed a nine-member provisional council, with three members each from the Socialists, the Radicals, and the Yugoslav Left (JUL). Critics argued that this decision was made without proper cause, and Marjanov accused the new administration of cheating and undermining the municipality's sizeable farming community.

=== The 2000 elections and after ===
In 2000, a coalition of parties opposed to Milošević and the SPS formed a new grouping called the Democratic Opposition of Serbia (DOS). Milošević was defeated by DOS candidate Vojislav Koštunica in the 2000 Yugoslavian presidential election and subsequently fell from power on 5 October 2000, a watershed moment in Serbian politics.

The DOS won a landslide victory in the 2000 Vojvodina provincial election, which took place concurrently with the Yugoslavian vote. Marjanov was re-elected to the provincial assembly as a DOS candidate, with a specific endorsement from the Vojvodina Coalition. For the next four years, he served as a supporter of the provincial administration. In the assembly, he was a member of the committee for economy.

Notwithstanding the Socialist Party's broader defeats in 2000, a coalition led by the SPS won a majority victory in Titel in the 2000 local elections with fourteen out of twenty-five seats. The resulting local government was not stable, and in 2001 the Serbian government again imposed a provisional council pending a new election later in the year. Socialist representative Stevan Gudurić made broadly critical remarks about the provisional council in a 2001 debate in the Serbian parliament, during which time he described Marjanov as being a council member.

=== Since 2004 ===
The DOS dissolved in 2003, and Marjanov sought re-election to the Vojvodina assembly in the 2004 provincial election as a candidate of the Together for Vojvodina coalition. He was defeated in the first round of voting.

Marjanov later led an independent list called With All Our Hearts for the Municipality of Titel in the 2008 Serbian local elections and was elected when the list won a single mandate in the local assembly. After the new assembly convened, he provided critical support for a local administration led by the Democratic Party (DS). He again led an independent list in the 2012 local elections and was not re-elected when it fell below the electoral threshold.

== Electoral record ==
=== Provincial (Vojvodina) ===
2004 Vojvodina provincial election: Titel
Candidate	Party	First round		Second round	
Candidate	Party	Votes	%	Votes	%
Milenko Ilić Mikica	Democratic Party–Boris Tadić	1,578	30.32	2,953	56.15
Marko Đurić	Serbian Radical Party	1,129	21.69	2,306	43.85
Mlađen Đurić	Socialist Party of Serbia	711	13.66		
Stevan Marjanov (incumbent)	Together for Vojvodina (Coalition: Municipality of Titel, League of Social Democrats of Vojvodina, and People's Movement Otpor!)	493	9.47		
Duško Kajtez	Democratic Party of Serbia	483	9.28		
Slavica Duma	Strength of Serbia Movement	470	9.03		
Jovan Vulić	G17 Plus	341	6.55		
Total		5,205	100.00	5,259	100.00
Valid votes		5,205	92.57	5,259	96.57
Invalid/blank votes		418	7.43	187	3.43
Total votes		5,623	100.00	5,446	100.00

2000 Vojvodina provincial election: Titel
Candidate	Party	Votes	%
Stevan Marjanov (incumbent)	Democratic Opposition of Serbia (Affiliation: Vojvodina Coalition)		elected
Marko Đurić	Serbian Radical Party		
other candidates			
Total			

1996 Vojvodina provincial election: Titel
Candidate	Party	Votes	%
Stevan Marjanov	Serbian Radical Party		elected
other candidates			
Total			
