= Dragoljub Živković =

Dragoljub Živković may refer to:

- Dragoljub Živković (Serbian engineer), Serbian engineer and politician, born 1955
- Dragoljub Živković (Serbian philosopher), Serbian philosopher and politician, born 1937
