= List of members of the National Assembly of Serbia, 1993–1997 =

== MPs by party ==
Name	Abbr.	Leader	Ideology	Political position	MPs	Gov′t
Socialist Party of Serbia; Социјалистичка партија Србије; Socijalistička partija Srbije	SPS	Slobodan Milošević	Communism; Yugoslavism	Left-wing	123 / 250	G
Serbian Radical Party; Српска радикална странка Srpska radikalna stranka	SRS	Vojislav Šešelj	Ultranationalism; Serbian irredentism	Far-right	39 / 250	O
Serbian Renewal Movement; Српски покрет обнове Srpski pokret obnove	SPO	Vuk Drašković	Monarchism; Atlanticism	Centre-right	37 / 250	O
Democratic Party; Демократска странка Demokratska stranka	DS	Zoran Đinđić	Social liberalism Pro-Europeanism	Centre	29 / 250	O
Democratic Party of Serbia; Демократска странка Србије; Demokratska stranka Srbije	DSS	Vojislav Koštunica	National conservatism Christian democracy	Right-wing	7 / 250	O
New Democracy; Нова демократија Nova demokratija	ND	Dušan Mihajlović	Liberalism; Social democracy	Centre to centre-left	5 / 250	G
Democratic Fellowship of Vojvodina Hungarians; Демократска заједница војвођанских Мађара; Demokratska zajednica vojvođanskih Mađara	DZVM	András Ágoston	Hungarian minority politics Regionalism	Centre	5 / 250	O
Civic Alliance of Serbia; Грађански савез Србије; Građanski savez Srbije	GSS	Vesna Pešić	Liberalism; Anti-nationalism	Centre	2 / 250	O
Party for Democratic Action; Партија за демократско деловање Partija za demokratsko delovanje	PDD	Riza Halimi	Albanian minority politics Regionalism	Right-wing	2 / 250	O
People's Peasant Party; Народна сељачка странка Narodna seljačka stranka	NSS	Dragan Veselinov	Agrarianism; Serbian nationalism	Right-wing	1 / 250	O
