= Dragan Tomić (Serbian politician, born 1958) =

Serbian politician

Dragan S. Tomić (Serbian Cyrillic: Драган С. Томић; born 23 August 1958) is a Serbian former politician. He has served two terms in the Serbian parliament and was a candidate for president of Serbia in 2003. Tomić was, at different times, a member of the Socialist Party of Serbia (SPS), the Socialist People's Party (SNS), and the Serbian Progressive Party (SNS).

== Early life and career ==
Tomić was born in Šabac, in what was then the People's Republic of Serbia in the Federal People's Republic of Yugoslavia. He holds a Bachelor of Laws degree. He started his career at the municipal court in Šabac and later served as director of the republic administration of public revenues in the same city.

== Politician ==
=== Socialist Party of Serbia ===
Tomić was the leader of the Socialist Party's local board in Šabac in the late 1990s. He appeared in the fourth position on a coalition electoral list of the Socialist Party, the Yugoslav Left (JUL), and New Democracy (ND) in the Šabac division in the 1997 Serbian parliamentary election. The list won three out of eight seats in the division, and he did not receive a mandate. (From 1992 to 2000, Serbia's electoral law stipulated that one-third of parliamentary mandates would be assigned to candidates from successful lists in numerical order, while the remaining two-thirds would be distributed amongst other candidates at the discretion of the sponsoring parties. It was common practice for the latter mandates to be awarded out of order. Tomić could have received a mandate despite his relatively low list position; in the event, however, he did not.)

During the 1990s, Serbian political life was dominated by the authoritarian rule of SPS leader Slobodan Milošević. Milošević was defeated in the 2000 Yugoslavian presidential election and fell from power on 5 October 2000. Serbia subsequently held a new parliamentary election in December 2000; prior to the vote, its electoral laws were changed such that the entire country became a single at-large electoral district and all mandates were assigned to candidates on successful lists at the discretion of the sponsoring parties or coalitions, irrespective of numerical order.

Tomić appeared in the 237th position (out of 250) on the SPS's electoral list in the 2000 Serbian parliamentary election; the list was mostly alphabetical. The Socialists won thirty-seven seats, and on this occasion he was given a mandate, taking his seat when the assembly convened in January 2001. The Democratic Opposition of Serbia (DOS) won a landslide victory, and the Socialists served in opposition.

=== Socialist People's Party ===
The Socialist Party experienced a serious split in 2002, with Branislav Ivković leading a breakaway group that ultimately became known as the Socialist People's Party. Tomić sided with Ivković, became secretary-general of the new party, and served as deputy leader of its assembly group. During this time, he was also a member of the assembly's legislative committee, finance committee, and privatization committee.

Tomić was the Socialist People's Party candidate in the 2003 Serbian presidential election, in which he presented himself as a "modernizer" of the socialist ideal. He finished fifth in a field of six candidates with about 2.25% of the valid votes.

Tomić subsequently appeared in the third position on the electoral list of the Socialist People's Party in the 2003 Serbian parliamentary election. The list did not cross the electoral threshold for assembly representation, and his first assembly term ended when the new parliament convened in early 2004.

The Socialist People's Party later contested the 2007 Serbian parliamentary election on a coalition electoral list of the Social Democratic Party (SDP) and the Party of United Pensioners of Serbia (PUPS). Tomić appeared in the 215th position on the list, which did not cross the electoral threshold. The Socialist People's Party ceased to exist in 2010.

=== Serbian Progressive Party ===
Tomić later joined the Serbian Progressive Party.

Serbia's electoral system was again reformed in 2011, such that all mandates were awarded to candidates on successful lists in numerical order. Tomić appeared in the sixty-eighth position on the SNS's Let's Get Serbia Moving list in the 2012 Serbian parliamentary election and was elected to a second assembly term when the list won seventy-three seats. The Progressives subsequently formed a coalition government with the Socialist Party of Serbia, the United Regions of Serbia (URS), and other parties, and Tomić served as a government supporter. He was a member of the finance committee, (Note: Formally known as the Committee on Finance, Republic Budget, and Control of Public Spending.) a deputy member of the justice committee (Note: Formally known as the Committee on Justice, Public Administration, and Local Self-Government.) and the committee on constitutional affairs and legislation, the leader of Serbia's parliamentary friendship groups with Belgium and Syria, and a member of the friendship groups with Australia, Belarus, Japan, Luxembourg, and Portugal.

Tomić was arrested in February 2014 on suspicion of misusing his position as president of the executive board of Univerzal Banka. Aleksandar Vučić described Tomić's arrest as proof that SNS members would not receive preferential treatment before the law. Given the circumstances, Tomić was not included in the SNS's list in the 2014 parliamentary election.

He was acquitted of the charges against him in November 2019.

== Electoral record ==
=== President of Serbia ===
2003 Serbian presidential election
Candidate	Party	Votes	%
Tomislav Nikolić	Serbian Radical Party	1,166,896	47.87
Dragoljub Mićunović	Democratic Opposition of Serbia	893,906	36.67
Velimir Ilić	New Serbia	229,229	9.40
Marijan Rističević	People's Peasant Party	72,105	2.96
Dragan Tomić	Socialist People's Party	54,703	2.24
Radoslav Avlijaš	Democratic Fatherland Party	20,782	0.85
Total		2,437,621	100.00
Valid votes		2,437,621	96.58
Invalid/blank votes		86,268	3.42
Total votes		2,523,889	100.00
Registered voters/turnout		6,506,505	38.79
Source: The election was invalidated due to low turnout.
