= Stevan Gudurić =

Serbian politician (born 1953)

Stevan Ž. Gudurić (Serbian Cyrillic: Стеван Ж. Гудурић; born 1953) is a politician in Serbia. He served in the National Assembly of Serbia from 2001 to 2004, initially as a member of the Socialist Party of Serbia and later with the breakaway Socialist People's Party.

== Private career ==
Gudurić is a mechanical engineer. He is from Beočin in Vojvodina.

== Politician ==
Gudurić appeared in the thirty-sixth position on the electoral list of the Socialist Party of Serbia in the 2000 Serbian parliamentary election. The list won thirty-seven mandates, and he was included in his party's delegation when the assembly met in January 2001. (From 2000 to 2011, mandates in Serbian parliamentary elections were awarded at the discretion of sponsoring parties or coalitions, and it was common practice for the mandates to be assigned out of numerical order. Gudurić did not automatically receive a mandate by virtue of his list position, but he was included in his party's delegation all the same.) The Democratic Opposition of Serbia won a landslide majority in this election, and the Socialists served in opposition in the parliament that followed.

In early 2002, Gudurić attended a rally in support of former president Slobodan Milošević, whose trial at the International Tribunal of the Former Yugoslavia was then beginning. Gudurić was quoted as saying, "All war criminals should be punished, but Slobodan Milosevic is not a criminal."

The Socialist Party experienced a serious split in mid-2002; Gudurić and Dragan Tomić were both expelled from the party in June 2002 for failing to recognize its existing leadership. Both subsequently joined a dissident faction that ultimately coalesced as the Socialist People's Party under the leadership of Branislav Ivković, and Gudurić served as a party vice-president.

The Socialist People's Party contested the 2003 Serbian parliamentary election in an alliance the People's Blok, and Gudurić appeared in the fourth position on their combined list. The list did not cross the electoral threshold to win representation in the assembly. Gudurić ran for mayor of Beočin in the 2004 Serbian local elections and was defeated in the second round of voting.

The Socialist People's Party participated in the 2007 Serbian parliamentary election on the combined electoral list of the Social Democratic Party and the Party of United Pensioners of Serbia. Gudurić received the forty-seventh position on the list. This list, too, did not cross the electoral threshold for assembly representation.

Gudurić sought election to the Beočin municipal assembly in the 2020 Serbian local elections on the electoral list of United Serbia. The list did not cross the electoral threshold.

== Electoral record ==
=== Municipal (Beočin) ===
2004 Beočin municipal election Mayor of Beočin - Second Round Results
Candidate	Party or Coalition	Votes	%
Zoran Tešić	Serbian Radical Party	2,501	52.79
Stevan Gudurić	Socialist People's Party	2,237	47.21
Total valid votes		4,738	100
