= Jelena Tanasković =

Serbian politician

- Јелена Танасковић
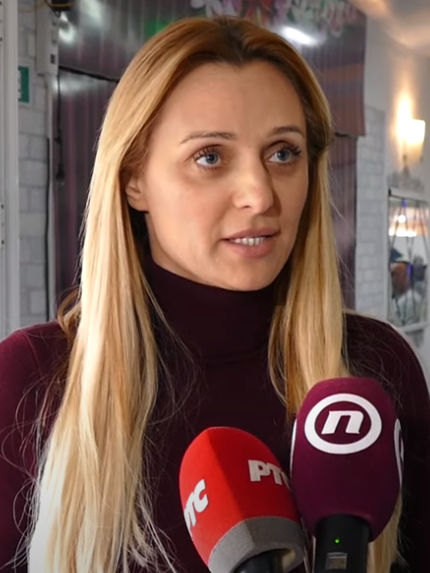
- Tanasković in February 2023

Minister of Agriculture, Forestry and Water Economy
- In office 26 October 2022 – 2 May 2024
- Prime Minister: Ana Brnabić
- Preceded by: Branislav Nedimović
- Succeeded by: Aleksandar Martinović

Personal details
- Born: 1976 (age 49–50) Belgrade, SR Serbia, SFR Yugoslavia
- Party: Independent
- Children: 2
- Occupation: Banker; politician

Jelena Tanasković (Serbian Cyrillic: Јелена Танасковић; born 1976) is a Serbian banker and politician who served as minister of agriculture, forestry and water economy from 2022 to 2024.

== Early life ==
Jelena Tanasković was born in 1976 in Belgrade, Socialist Republic of Serbia, Socialist Federal Republic of Yugoslavia. She finished her primary, secondary studies, as well as basic studies of economics in Belgrade.

== Career ==
She began her career in a privately held external trading firm in the finance sector in 2003; she later worked as a banker for NLB Group for ten years. In 2017, she was appointed as the secretary of finance for Belgrade. A year later, she became the state secretary in the minister of finance, during which she was a close associate of Siniša Mali. In 2020, she was named member of the executive board of Dunav osiguranje and as the state secretary in the ministry of environmental protection.

=== Minister of Agriculture, Forestry and Water Economy ===
It was announced on 23 October 2022 that Tanasković would serve as the minister of agriculture, forestry and water economy in the third cabinet of Ana Brnabić. She was sworn in on 26 October, succeeding Branislav Nedimović. She was succeeded by Aleksandar Martinović on 2 May 2024.

== Political positions ==
Tanasković declared that "environmentalism is one of the three key priorities of the country" in July 2021.

== Personal life ==
Tanasković is married and has two children.

Government offices
Preceded by Branislav Nedimović	Minister of Agriculture, Forestry and Water Economy; 2022–2024	Succeeded by Aleksandar Martinović
