= Dmitar Stanišić =

Serbian politician

Dmitar Stanišić (Serbian Cyrillic: Дмитар Станишић; born 30 May 1982) is a politician in Serbia. He has served in the Assembly of Vojvodina since 2016 as a member of the Serbian Progressive Party.

== Private career ==
Stanišić holds a Bachelor of Laws degree and lives in Sremska Mitrovica.

== Politician ==
=== Municipal politics ===
Stanišić sought election to the Sremska Mitrovica municipal assembly in the 2012 Serbian local elections, appearing in the seventh position on an independent list headed by mayor Branislav Nedimović. He was elected when the list won fifteen mandates and was appointed to the city council (i.e., the executive branch of the city government) on 5 September 2012. Both Nedimović and Stanišić subsequently joined the Progressive Party.

Stanišić was not a candidate for re-election at the local level in 2016. He was given the second position on the Progressive list in the 2020 Serbian local elections and was again elected when the list won a majority victory with forty-two out of sixty-one mandates.

=== Provincial assembly ===
Stanisič received the twelfth position on the Progressive Party's list in the 2016 Vojvodina provincial election and was elected when the list won a majority victory with sixty-three out of 120 seats. He subsequently led the assembly committee for European integration and international cooperation and was the leader of the Vojvodina Assembly's parliamentary friendship group with the Republika Srpska.

He was promoted to the sixth position on the Progressive list for the 2020 Vojvodina provincial election and was elected when the list won an increased majority with seventy-six seats. He was chosen as leader of the Progressive Party group in the assembly after the election and represented the party in official talks concerning the formation of a new coalition government. Stanišić is also a member of the committee on regulations and the committee on issues on the constitutional and legal status of the province.
