= Goran Trivan =

Serbian politician (born 1962)

- Горан Триван
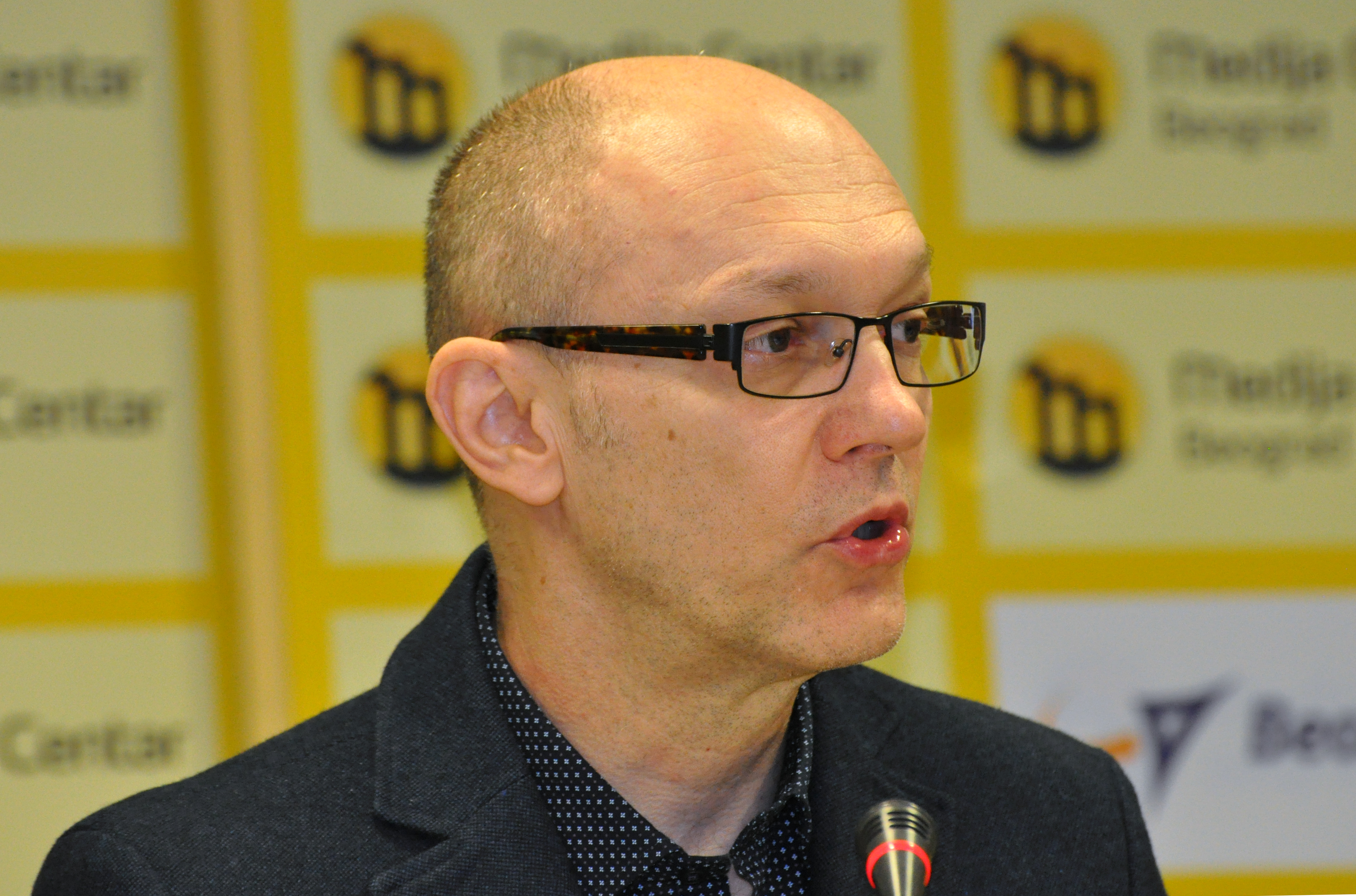
- Serbian environmental protection minister Trivan on green economy and systemic waste management in September 2017.

Minister of Environmental Protection
- In office 29 June 2017 – 28 October 2020
- Prime Minister: Ana Brnabić
- Preceded by: Branislav Nedimović (Environment)

Minister of Youth and Sports
- In office 11 February 1991 – 31 July 1991
- Prime Minister: Dragutin Zelenović
- Preceded by: Position established
- Succeeded by: Dragan Kićanović

Personal details
- Born: 1962 (age 63–64) Kladovo, PR Serbia, FPR Yugoslavia
- Party: Socialist Party of Serbia (1991–present)
- Education: University of Belgrade
- Occupation: Politician

Goran Trivan (Serbian Cyrillic: Горан Триван, born 1962) is a Serbian politician. He served as the Minister of Environmental Protection since 29 June 2017 until October 2020. He is a member of the Socialist Party of Serbia since its foundation.

He has also served as the Minister of Youth and Sports (in 1991), in the first convocation of the Government of Serbia.

== Education and career ==
Trivan was born in Kladovo, SFR Yugoslavia, where he finished primary and secondary school. He graduated from the University of Belgrade Faculty of Forestry. Being a member of Socialist Party of Serbia, he served as the Minister of Youth and Sports in the first convocation of the Government of Serbia, from 11 February until 31 July 1991.

Later, he worked in national forestry company Srbijašume, where he later became executive director. Being a prominent ruling party member, he has served as the president and member of Steering committee of numerous national institutions in various fields.

In November 2001, one year after the overthrow of Slobodan Milošević, he was arrested on suspicion of committing the criminal act of incitement, which cost a Kladovo-based youth camp a total of 6.5 million dinars. He was later acquitted due to absolute obsolescence.

He was the head of the Belgrade Secretariat for Environmental Protection from 2008 to 2017.

=== 2017–2020: Minister of Environmental Protection ===
On 29 June 2017, he was named the Minister of Environmental Protection of Serbia in the cabinet of Ana Brnabić.

In August 2017, Trivan has stated that Serbia, which significantly lags behind other European countries in the field of environmental protection, needs 15 billion euros of investments to get up to speed in this arena. He has also stated that his ministry would focus on projects (thus generating more significant funds from the EU, as well as other foreign investments), better management of landfills, and more stringent control of harmful gases. In August 2017, Trivan stated Serbia needed an urgent investment of around 5 billion euros into its wastewater treatment plants. He has also criticized sales of water resources to foreign companies, saying that long-term consequences of such actions would be devastating for Serbia.

Political offices
Preceded by Branislav Nedimović (Environment)	Minister of Environmental Protection; 2017–present	Incumbent
Preceded by Position established	Minister of Youth and Sports; 1991	Succeeded by Dragan Kićanović
