= Gojko Veličković =

Serbian politician

Gojko Veličković (Serbian Cyrillic: Гојко Величковић; born 31 August 1952) is a Serbian politician. He has served three terms as the mayor of Leskovac and was a member of the Serbian parliament from 1994 to 1997. He is currently a member of the Leskovac city assembly. Veličković has at different times been a member of the Socialist Party of Serbia (SPS), a member and the leader of the Socialist People's Party (SNS), a member of the Social Democratic Alliance (SDS), a member of the Serbian Progressive Party (SNS), and the leader of his own political movement.

== Early life and career ==
Veličković was born in the village of Lozane in the municipality of Bojnik, in what was then the People's Republic of Serbia in the Federal People's Republic of Yugoslavia. He graduated from the University of Belgrade Faculty of Political Sciences, worked as a journalist and editor at Radio Novi Pazar, and began working for the municipal administration of Leskovac in the early 1980s. In the late 1980s, he was secretary of the Socialist Alliance of Working People (SSRN) in Leskovac.

== Politician ==
=== Socialist Party of Serbia ===
From 1990 to 2000, the Socialist Party dominated the political culture of Serbia under the authoritarian leadership of Slobodan Milošević. Veličković joined the SPS and was elected to the Leskovac municipal assembly in the December 1992 Serbian local elections. The Socialists won a landslide majority victory in the city, and he was chosen afterward as assembly president, a position that was then equivalent to mayor.

Veličković appeared in the ninth position on the Socialist Party's electoral list for the Leskovac electoral division in the 1993 Serbian parliamentary election and was awarded a mandate when the list won seventeen out of twenty-five seats. (From 1992 to 2000, Serbia's electoral law stipulated that one-third of parliamentary mandates would be assigned to candidates from successful lists in numerical order, while the remaining two-thirds would be distributed amongst other candidates at the discretion of the sponsoring parties. Veličković was not automatically elected by virtue of his list position, but he received a mandate all the same.) The Socialists won a strong plurality victory overall in the 1993 election and afterward formed a new government with support from the smaller New Democracy (ND) party. In the assembly, Veličković served as a member of the constitutional committee and the committee on foreign affairs.

Veličković complained about the historical mismanagement of Leskovac's textile industry in this period, remarking that, "not a single program goal in [the] industry has been achieved in the last fifty years. There was not even a clearly defined development concept. The problem of developing the Leskovac textile industry is a problem of strategy."

The Socialists won another majority victory in Leskovac in the 1996 Serbian local elections, taking forty-five out of sixty-nine seats. The Yugoslav Left (JUL), a party generally aligned with the SPS, won a further thirteen seats. Gojković was chosen afterward for a second term as mayor, although he did not remain long in office.

=== Independent ===
On 17 February 1997, the main board of the SPS voted to expel Veličković from the party due to "disrespect for party discipline and serious damage to the reputation of an SPS member." The exact nature of these charges was not revealed, though it was noted in the Serbian media that Veličković had previously quarrelled with Ivica Dačić over the leadership of the SPS's city board in Leskovac. The expulsion led to a split in the ranks of the SPS in the city; at least initially, a majority of the party's representatives in the local assembly sided with Veličković. The JUL representatives, however, unanimously opposed him. Although it was not initially clear which side would command a majority in the assembly, Veličković's tenure as mayor ended not long afterward. His parliamentary mandate was terminated on 15 April 1997.

Veličković led his own electoral list for the smaller, redistributed Leskovac division in the 1997 Serbian parliamentary election. The list did not cross the electoral threshold for assembly representation.

Slobodan Milošević fell from power in October 2000, and the Socialists ceased to dominate the political life of Serbia after this time.

=== Socialist People's Party ===
Former SPS parliamentary leader Branislav Ivković founded the breakaway Socialist People's Party in 2003. Veličković was a founding member of the new organization.

Serbia reformed its local electoral laws after the 2000 Serbian local elections, separating the offices of mayor and assembly president and introducing direct elections for mayors. Leskovac held an early off-year election in December 2002; Veličković was the SNS's nominee for mayor and defeated SPS candidate Dušan Cvetković in the second round of voting, which was held in January 2003. The SNS won eleven out of seventy-five seats in the concurrent elections for the local assembly and later formed a coalition government with several other parties, including the SPS, the Serbian Radical Party (SRS), and the Social Democratic Party (SDP).

Veličković appeared in the fifth position on the SNS's electoral list in the 2003 Serbian parliamentary election. The list did not cross the electoral threshold.

Following the 2004 Serbian presidential election, Branislav Ivković left the Socialist People's Party to join the Strength of Serbia Movement (PSS). Veličković succeeded him as SNS leader and oversaw the party's re-registration at the republic level in March 2005. Although the party remained active for several more years, it ceased to be a major force in Serbian politics after this time.

Veličković faced a recall election in October 2004, initiated by opposition parties that charged he was enriching himself in office and that construction companies he owned were receiving improper funding through municipal tenders. He ultimately survived the vote and remained in office.

In October 2005, Veličković was arrested while entering Croatia at the Bajakovo border crossing, due to his name appearing on a wanted list. He was released when it was discovered that the "Gojko Veličković" on the list was a different person.

Leskovac's annual municipal budget was approved at a contentious meeting of the local assembly in December 2005. Prior to the vote, assembly president Goran Cvetanović of the SRS announced his resignation, citing poor relations with the mayor. During this period, reports circulated that Veličković was allegedly involved in the misappropriation of funds intended for municipal social assistance.

Veličković ran for re-election as mayor of Leskovac in the 2006 off-year local election. He finished third and was eliminated in the first round of voting.

The direct election of mayors proved to be a short-lived experiment and was abandoned with the 2008 Serbian local elections. In that year, the Socialist People's Party and the SDP ran in an alliance in Leskovac and won five seats. Veličković was re-elected to the assembly; after the election, the SNS formed an assembly group with G17 Plus.

In June 2011, the High Court in Leskovac convicted Veličković of misappropriating several million dinars intended for social assistance. The Appellate Court in Niš subsequently overturned the decision and ordered a new trial. In March 2016, he was found not guilty of the charges.

=== Social Democratic Alliance ===
The Socialist People's Party dissolved in 2010. Veličković subsequently joined the Social Democratic Alliance and appeared third on its electoral list in the 2012 Serbian parliamentary election. The list did not cross the electoral threshold. Veličković attempted to lead a local coalition of the SDS and the United Peasant Party (USS) in Leskovac for the concurrent 2012 local elections, but the list was annulled by the city election commission due to irregularities.

=== Serbian Progressive Party ===
In December 2012, Leskovac mayor Goran Cvetanović (who was by this time a member of the Serbian Progressive Party) appointed Veličković to the role of mayor's assistant. Veličković soon joined the Progressives himself and in August 2014 was appointed acting director of Leskovac's city bus station.

Veličković and Cvetanović subsequently fell out again, and Veličković was removed as acting director in April 2017, amid mutual recriminations. He left the SNS after this time. In December 2017, a criminal charge that Cvetanović had initiated against Veličković was dismissed.

=== Once more an Independent ===
Veličković led his own electoral list for Leskovac in the 2020 local elections and was re-elected to the city assembly when the list won three seats. He did not make an appearance in the assembly until March 2023, when he delivered a speech that was generally considered to be conciliatory toward the Progressives. The regional media outlet Jugmedia observed of the speech that, "with his undoubted eloquence and education, as well as experience, [Veličković] reminded us of a generation of educated polite politicians with lordly manners."

Veličković appeared in the sixth position on Socialist Party's coalition electoral list in the 2023 local elections in Leskovac; formally, his endorsement was from the SPS's partner United Serbia (JS), although he appears not to have been a member of that or any other party. The list won ten seats, and he was elected to another assembly term.

== Electoral record ==
=== Local (Leskovac) ===
2006 Leskovac local election: Mayor of Leskovac
Candidate	Party	First round		Second round	
Candidate	Party	Votes	%	Votes	%
Vladan Marinković	Democratic Party–G17 Plus (Affiliation: Democratic Party)		25.65		54.1
Dr. Goran Cvetanović	Serbian Radical Party		25.41		44.11
Gojko Veličković (incumbent)	Socialist People's Party		13.65		
Prof. Dr. Miodrag Stamenković Abraš	Democratic Party of Serbia–New Serbia–United Serbia (Affiliation: New Serbia)		11.80		
Dr. Gordana Savić	Social Democratic Party		5.74		
Dr. Dragan Jovanović	Citizens' Group: Voice of Reason		5.44		
Jasmina Nikolić	Democratic Alliance		4.43		
Novica Stojanović Filka	Serbian Renewal Movement		4.09		
Živojin Stojković Džoni	Party of United Pensioners of Serbia		1.90		
Milorad Pejčić Toza	Liberal Democratic Party		1.55		
Total					

2002–03 Leskovac local election: Mayor of Leskovac
Candidate	Party	First round		Second round	
Candidate	Party	Votes	%	Votes	%
Gojko Veličković	Socialist People's Party	11,816	19.58	23,556	55.10
Dušan Cvetković Lešnjak	Socialist Party of Serbia	11,871	19.68	19,199	44.90
Prof. Dr. Dragoljub Živković	Democratic Opposition of Serbia–Coalition for Leskovac (Affiliation: Democratic Party)	11,313	18.75		
Bojana Ristić	Serbian Renewal Movement	9,050	15.00		
Milorad Marjanović Mile	People's Democratic Party	5,228	8.66		
Živorad Denić Žika Hemigal	Democratic Alternative	3,423	5.67		
Prof. Dr. Miodrag Stamenković Abraš	New Serbia	2,414	4.00		
Borivoje Petković Zubar	Social Democracy (?)	2,035	3.37		
Slaviša Mladenović	People's Radical Party of Serbia	1,746	2.89		
Slobodan Mitrović Beli	not listed	1,439	2.39		
Total		60,335	100.00	42,755	100.00
Valid votes		60,335	96.47	42,755	97.42
Invalid/blank votes		2,210	3.53	1,133	2.58
Total votes		62,545	100.00	43,888	100.00
Registered voters/turnout		127,182	49.18	127,182	34.51
