= Irena Vujović =

Serbian politician (born 1983)

- Ирена Вујовић
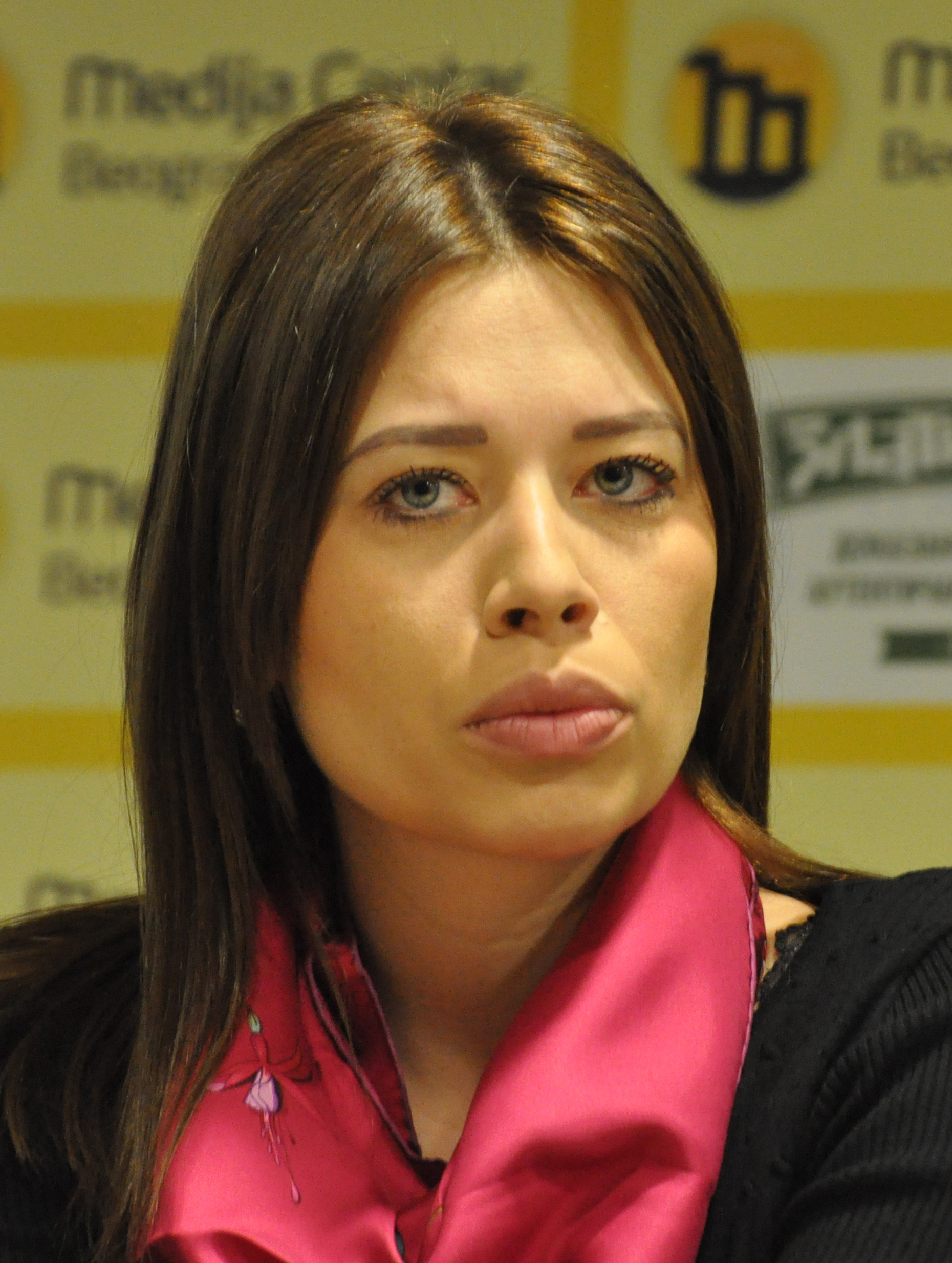
- Vujović in 2018

Minister of Environmental Protection
- In office 28 October 2020 – 16 April 2025
- Prime Minister: Ana Brnabić; Ivica Dačić (acting); Miloš Vučević
- Preceded by: Goran Trivan
- Succeeded by: Sara Pavkov

President of the Savski Venac Municipality
- In office 4 June 2016 – 4 September 2020
- Preceded by: Dušan Dinčić
- Succeeded by: Miloš Vidović

Personal details
- Born: 3 April 1983 (age 43) Belgrade, SR Serbia, SFR Yugoslavia
- Party: SNS (since 2008)
- Relatives: Nikola Kovačević (great-grandfather)
- Education: Megatrend University
- Occupation: Politician

Irena Vujović (Serbian Cyrillic: Ирена Вујовић; born 3 April 1983) is a Serbian politician who served as the minister of environmental protection from 2020 to 2025. A member of the Serbian Progressive Party (SNS), she previously served as president of the Savski Venac Municipality from 2016 to 2020.

== Early life and education ==
She was born in 1983 in Belgrade. Her great-grandfather was Nikola Kovačević, a high ranking Montenegrin member of the League of Communists of Yugoslavia and the brother of Sava Kovačević, a commander of the Yugoslav Partisans.

She has bachelor's and master's degrees in economics from the Faculty of International Economics at the Megatrend University and is currently attending doctoral studies at the same university.

From 2005 to 2008, she was the coordinator of cooperation in the Department of International Cooperation at the Megatrend University. She was also a teaching associate in the subjects Modern Russian Economy and Economics of the Post-Soviet Space.

== Politics ==
She joined the Serbian Progressive Party after its founding in 2008. She was a member of the main board, and was elected a member of the Serbian Progressive Party presidency on 28 May 2016 at the party's election assembly.

After the 2012 and 2014 Serbian parliamentary elections, she was elected a member of the National Assembly. After the 2014 elections, the Mayor of Belgrade, Siniša Mali, appointed her as the Assistant Mayor in charge of social activities. In May 2014, she resigned from the National Assembly, because the Agency for the Fight against Corruption announced that she could not perform the function of the Assistant Mayor of Belgrade at the same time.

She has been the head of the Gender Equality Council since 2015. She is the Deputy President of the Council for the Rights of Children and is the political representative of Eurocities.

After the local elections in 2016, she was elected president of the municipality of Savski Venac and left the position of Assistant Mayor of Belgrade. In the 2018 Belgrade City Assembly elections, she was on the list of candidates of the Serbian Progressive Party. She was mentioned as the favorite of the Progressives for the future mayor of Belgrade, next to Goran Vesić.
