= Pavkov =

Pavkov (Serbian Cyrillic: Павков) is a Serbian surname. Notable people with the surname include:

- Milan Pavkov (born 1994), Serbian footballer
- Sara Pavkov (born 1992), Serbian politician
- Stan Pavkov (1916–2002), American football player and coach
