= 3rd National Assembly =

3rd National Assembly may refer to:

- 3rd National Assembly of France
- 3rd National Assembly of Pakistan
- 3rd National Assembly of the Philippines
- 3rd National Assembly of Serbia
- 3rd National Assembly of South Korea
- 3rd National Assembly at Troezen
- 3rd National Assembly for Wales
