= Dragoljub Živković (Serbian engineer) =

Serbian engineer and politician

Dragoljub Živković (Serbian Cyrillic: Драгољуб Живковић; born 26 March 1955) is a Serbian engineer and politician. He was the mayor of Leskovac from 2000 to 2003 and served in the Serbian parliament from 2004 to 2007. Živković was at different times a member of the Democratic Party (DS) and the Social Democratic Party (SDS).

== Early life and academic career ==
Živković was born in Leskovac, in what was then the People's Republic of Serbia in the Federal People's Republic of Yugoslavia. Raised in the city, he later graduated from the University of Belgrade Faculty of Mechanical Engineering (1980), majoring in thermoenergetics. He received his master's degree in 1985 and his Ph.D in 1993.

Živković became an assistant professor at the University of Niš Department of Mechanical Engineering in 1993, an associate professor in 1998, and a full professor in 2003. He has published widely in his field. He was awarded the Silver Badge of the University of Niš in 2018, and in 2021 he was awarded the Charter of the Faculty of Mechanical Engineering.

== Politician ==
=== Mayor of Leskovac ===
In 2000, the Democratic Party joined the Democratic Opposition of Serbia (DOS), a broad and ideologically diverse coalition of parties opposed to Slobodan Milošević's administration. DOS candidate Vojislav Koštunica defeated Milošević in the 2000 Yugoslavian presidential election, and Milošević subsequently fell from power on 5 October 2000. In the 2000 Serbian local elections, which took place concurrently with the Yugoslavian vote, the DOS won majority victories in several major cities.

In Leskovac, the alliance around Milošević's Socialist Party of Serbia (SPS) actually won a narrow majority victory, but the party's local leadership realized they would not be able to govern effectively after Milošević's defeat. After repeat voting and some changes in party affiliation among the elected representatives, the DOS gained a narrow majority in the assembly. Živković, who had been elected as a DOS candidate, was chosen on 7 November 2000 as the assembly's president, a position that was then equivalent to mayor. His administration is remembered primarily for paying down the previous government's debt of 1.5 million dinars and achieving a balanced budget.

Živković's assembly majority was never stable, and his administration fell in April 2002; he was subsequently appointed by the Serbian government to lead an interim administration pending a new election. By this time, Serbia's municipal election laws had been reformed such that mayors were directly elected and the offices of mayor and assembly president were separated. In the December 2002 mayoral election, Živković unexpectedly finished in third place and did not make it to the second round of voting. His term as interim mayor ended in early 2003.

=== Parliamentarian ===
Živković later appeared in the ninety-fifth position on the Democratic Party's electoral list for the 2003 Serbian parliamentary election and was awarded a mandate after the list won thirty-seven seats. (From 2000 to 2011, all mandates in Serbian parliamentary elections were awarded to candidates on successful lists at the discretion of the sponsoring parties or coalitions, irrespective of numerical order.) He took his seat when the assembly convened in January 2004; the DS served in opposition for the term that followed. In the assembly, Živković was a member of the committee on industry, the committee on education, and the committee on science and technological development.

He appeared in the sixty-ninth position on the Democratic Party's list in the 2007 Serbian parliamentary election. The list won sixty-four seats, and on this occasion he did not receive a new mandate.

=== Later years ===
The Democratic Party split in 2014, with former leader Boris Tadić establishing a breakaway group that ultimately became known as the Social Democratic Party. Živković joined the party, appeared in the fourth position on its electoral list for Leskovac in the 2016 Serbian local elections, and was re-elected to the local assembly when the list won six seats.

He later appeared in the third position on an independent list led by Nenad Zdravković in the 2020 local elections and was elected again when the list won six seats. He did not seek re-election in 2023.

Živković supported the Moramo (We Must) coalition in the 2022 Serbian parliamentary election. He did not support a specific list in the 2023 parliamentary election but called for a change in government.

== Electoral record ==
=== Local (Leskovac) ===
2002–03 Leskovac local election: Mayor of Leskovac
Candidate	Party	First round		Second round	
Candidate	Party	Votes	%	Votes	%
Gojko Veličković	Socialist People's Party	11,816	19.58	23,556	55.10
Dušan Cvetković Lešnjak	Socialist Party of Serbia	11,871	19.68	19,199	44.90
Dragoljub Živković	Democratic Opposition of Serbia–Coalition for Leskovac (Affiliation: Democratic Party)	11,313	18.75		
Bojana Ristić	Serbian Renewal Movement	9,050	15.00		
Milorad Marjanović Mile	People's Democratic Party	5,228	8.66		
Živorad Denić Žika Hemigal	Democratic Alternative	3,423	5.67		
Prof. Dr. Miodrag Stamenković Abraš	New Serbia	2,414	4.00		
Borivoje Petković Zubar	Social Democracy (?)	2,035	3.37		
Slaviša Mladenović	People's Radical Party of Serbia	1,746	2.89		
Slobodan Mitrović Beli	not listed	1,439	2.39		
Total		60,335	100.00	42,755	100.00
Valid votes		60,335	96.47	42,755	97.42
Invalid/blank votes		2,210	3.53	1,133	2.58
Total votes		62,545	100.00	43,888	100.00
Registered voters/turnout		127,182	49.18	127,182	34.51
