= Snežana Bogosavljević Bošković =

Serbian agronomist and politician

- Снежана Богосављевић Бошковић
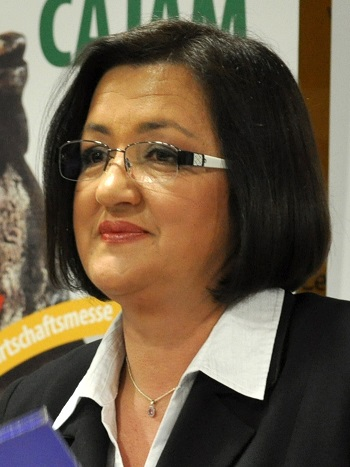

Minister of Agriculture and Environmental Protection
- In office 27 April 2014 – 11 August 2016
- Prime Minister: Aleksandar Vučić
- Preceded by: Dragan Glamočić (Minister of Agriculture, Forestry, and Water Management); Zorana Mihajlović (Minister of Energy, Development, and Environment)
- Succeeded by: Branislav Nedimović

Member of the National Assembly of the Republic of Serbia
- In office 3 June 2016 – 3 August 2020
- In office 30 July 2012 – 27 April 2014

Personal details
- Born: 24 January 1964 (age 62) Ivanjica, SFR Yugoslavia
- Party: SPS
- Education: University of Kragujevac; University of Belgrade
- Occupation: Politician, university professor

Snežana Bogosavljević Bošković (Serbian Cyrillic: Снежана Богосављевић Бошковић; born 24 January 1964) is a Serbian politician and academic. She was Serbia's minister of agriculture and environmental protection from 2014 to 2016 and has served in the Serbian parliament. Bogosavljević Bošković is a member of the Socialist Party of Serbia (SPS).

== Early life and career ==
Bogosavljević Bošković was born in Ivanjica, in what was then the Socialist Republic of Serbia in the Socialist Federal Republic of Yugoslavia. She graduated from the University of Kragujevac Faculty of Agronomy in Čačak in 1986 and later earned a master's degree (1990) and a Ph.D. (1994) from the University of Belgrade Faculty of Agriculture in Zemun. She was appointed in 2006 as a full professor at the University of Kragujevac and has led the Department of Animal Husbandry and Animal Produce Technology at the Faculty of Agronomy in Čačak. She is a member of the World Poultry Science Association and has authored or co-authored more than two hundred scientific papers.

== Politician ==
Bogosavljević Bošković joined the Socialist Party of Serbia on its formation in 1990 and has served on its main board.

=== Parliamentarian (2012–14) ===
Bogosavljević Bošković appeared in the forty-fifth position on the Socialist Party's electoral list in the 2012 Serbian parliamentary election and narrowly missed direct election when the list won forty-four mandates. The SPS subsequently formed a coalition government with the Serbian Progressive Party (SNS) and other parties, and several of its elected delegates resigned to take ministerial positions. Bogosavljević Bošković was awarded a replacement mandate on 30 July 2012; technically, she was the replacement for party leader Ivica Dačić. In her first term, she was a member of the agriculture committee, (Note: Formally known as the Committee on Agriculture, Forestry, and Water Management.) a deputy member of the education committee, (Note: Formally known as the Committee on Education, Science, Technological Development, and the Information Society.) the president of Serbia's parliamentary friendship group with Hungary, and a member of the friendship groups with Bosnia and Herzegovina, Croatia, Cyprus, Germany, Latvia, and Montenegro.

She also received the eleventh position on the Socialist Party's list for Čačak in the 2012 Serbian local elections, which were held concurrently with the parliamentary vote, and was elected when the list won twelve mandates. She resigned from the city assembly on 31 August 2012.

Bogosavljević Bošković was promoted to the eighteenth position on the SPS's list in the 2014 Serbian parliamentary election and was re-elected when the list again won forty-four seats.

=== Minister of Agriculture and Environmental Protection (2014–16) ===
The Serbian Progressive Party won a majority victory in the 2014 parliamentary election and afterward formed a new coalition government with the Socialists. Aleksandar Vučić of the SNS became prime minister on 27 April 2014, and Bogosavljević Bošković was appointed as Serbia's minister of agriculture and environmental protection. Her appointment was considered a surprise, in that she was not well known to the general public.

The 2014 Southeast Europe floods took place just after Bogosavljević Bošković's appointment. In the aftermath of the disaster, she said that the cost of registered damages to the country's flood defence facilities was in excess of two billion Serbian dollars, while the damage to the agricultural sector was estimated at €228 million, with €154 million needed for immediate recovery.

When the European Union (EU) and the United States of America imposed sanctions on Russia in 2014 over the annexation of Crimea, Bogosavljević Bošković said that Serbia had a unique opportunity to increase its agricultural and food exports to the Russian market. The Russian media quoted her as saying, "The Russian side is interested in all our agricultural and food products, particularly meat, milk, fruit and vegetables. We can export as much cheese as we can produce." She also indicated that Serbia was interested in participating in joint agricultural projects with Russian investors and that Danube River transport could be used to cut down on shipment time to Russia. Later in the year, she said, “The embargo on trade between Russia, [the European Union] and US does not oblige or affect us. We want to export our products, that is, to create conditions for our producers to export their products to the interested markets.

Bogosavljević Bošković brought Serbia into a partnership with Germany on bioenergy projects in September 2014. Later that year, while meeting a delegation from the International Monetary Fund, she said that increased competitiveness in the agriculture sector and the food industry would be necessary for Serbia to integrate with the European Union. In early 2015, she signed a deal permitting the Italian firm Rigoni di Asiago to invest between twenty and thirty million euros in Serbia for the organic production of hazelnuts.

Serbia was required to accept increased milk imports from the European Union at low prices in 2015. Vučić and Bogosavljević Bošković responded that Serbia would need to impose surcharge fees, and Bogosavljević Bošković spoke of further discussions with the EU to protect Serbia's dairy sector.

In June 2015, Serbia approved a plan to reduce greenhouse gas emissions 9.8 per cent by 2030. Bogosavljević Bošković said that Serbia was the first country in the region to pledge voluntary cuts.

A late 2015 report in Politika indicated that Vučić was dissatisfied with the work of the agriculture ministry under Bogosavljević Bošković's leadership.

=== Return to parliament (2016–20) ===
Bogosavljević Bošković received the eighth position on the Socialist Party's list in the 2016 parliamentary election was re-elected to the national assembly when the list won twenty-nine seats. The Progressives and their allies won a second majority victory and formed another coalition government with the Socialists after the election. Bogosavljević Bošković was not re-appointed to cabinet and remained a member of the assembly. In the 2016–20 term, she was a member of the culture and information committee and the environmental protection committee, a member of Serbia's delegation to the Inter-Parliamentary Union assembly, and a member of the parliamentary friendship groups with Austria, Belarus, Bosnia and Herzegovina, Cyprus, the Czech Republic, Denmark, Hungary, Kazakhstan, Montenegro, North Macedonia, Norway, Poland, Russia, and Slovenia.

She received the 105th position on the SPS list in the 2020 parliamentary election. Election from this position was not a realistic prospect, and she was not re-elected when the list won thirty-two seats. She has not returned to active political life since this time.
