= Ministry of Environmental Protection (Serbia) =

Government ministry of Serbia

- Министарство заштите животне средине Ministarstvo zaštite životne sredine

Ministry overview
- Formed: 31 July 1991; 35 years ago
- Jurisdiction: Government of Serbia
- Headquarters: Omladinskih brigada 1, Belgrade, Serbia
- Minister responsible: Sara Pavkov
- Website: ekologija.gov.rs

The Ministry of Environmental Protection (Serbian: Министарство заштите животне средине, romanized: Ministarstvo zaštite životne sredine) is a ministry in the Government of Serbia which is in the charge of the environmental protection. The current minister is Sara Pavkov, in office since 2025.

== History ==
The ministry was established in 1991. Over the years, several departments were added and removed in the Ministry's jurisdiction. The area covered by the Ministry mostly included environmental protection, natural resources, spatial planning. From 2004 to 2007, the Department for environmental protection was under Ministry of Science jurisdiction. In 2011, the Department for mining of the Ministry of Mining and Energy was added to the Ministry only to be removed in 2014. In 2012, Department for environmental protection was moved into Ministry of Energy, Development, and Environment under Zorana Mihajlović. The Ministry was abolished in 2014, as the Department for mining was merged into Ministry of Mining and Energy. In 2017, it was split from the Ministry of Agriculture and Environmental Protection.

== List of ministers ==
Political party: SPS SRS DS SNS

Name	Party	Term of office		Prime Minister (Cabinet)
Minister of Environmental Protection
Pavle Todorović (born 1950)	SPS	31 July 1991	18 March 1994	Zelenović (I); Božović (I); Šainović (I)
Jordan Aleksić (1950–2021)	SPS	18 March 1994	24 March 1998	Marjanović (I)
Branislav Blažić (1957–2020)	SRS	24 March 1998	24 October 2000	Marjanović (II)
Mila Rosić (born 1967)	SPS	24 October 2000	25 January 2001	Minić (transitional)
Minister of Natural Resources and Environmental Protection
Anđelka Mihajlov (born 1951)	DS	13 June 2002	3 March 2004	Đinđić (I); Živković (I)
Merged into Ministry of Science and Environmental Protection
Minister of Environmental Protection
Saša Dragin (born 1972)	DS	15 May 2007	7 July 2008	Koštunica (II)
Minister of Environment and Spatial Planning
Oliver Dulić (born 1975)	DS	7 July 2008	14 March 2011	Cvetković (I)
Minister of Environment, Mining, and Spatial Planning
Oliver Dulić (born 1975)	DS	14 March 2011	27 July 2012	Cvetković (I)
Minister of Natural Resources, Mining, and Spatial Planning
Milan Bačević (born 1953)	SNS	27 July 2012	27 April 2014	Dačić (I)
Abolished
Minister of Environmental Protection
Goran Trivan (born 1962)	SPS	29 June 2017	28 October 2020	Brnabić (I)
Irena Vujović (born 1983)	SNS	28 October 2020	16 April 2025	Brnabić (II); Vučević (I)
Sara Pavkov (born 1992)	SNS	16 April 2025	Incumbent	Macut (I)
