= Vojvodina Coalition =

Vojvodina Coalition Коалиција Војводина Koalicija Vojvodina
- Leader: Dragan Veselinov; Mile Isakov; Nenad Čanak
- Founded: 1996
- Dissolved: 2005
- Headquarters: Pančevo
- Ideology: Vojvodina autonomism Regionalism; Social democracy
- Political position: Centre-left

The Vojvodina Coalition (Serbian: Коалиција Војводина / Koalicija Vojvodina) was a political coalition in the Serbian province of Vojvodina from 1996 to 2005. In 2005, it united with several other parties into newly formed Vojvodina's Party.

== History ==
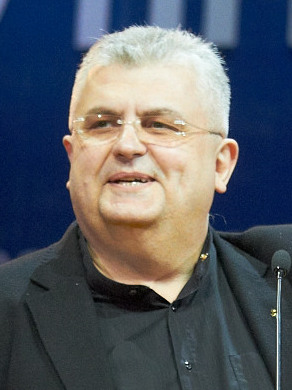
Nenad Čanak, President of LSV

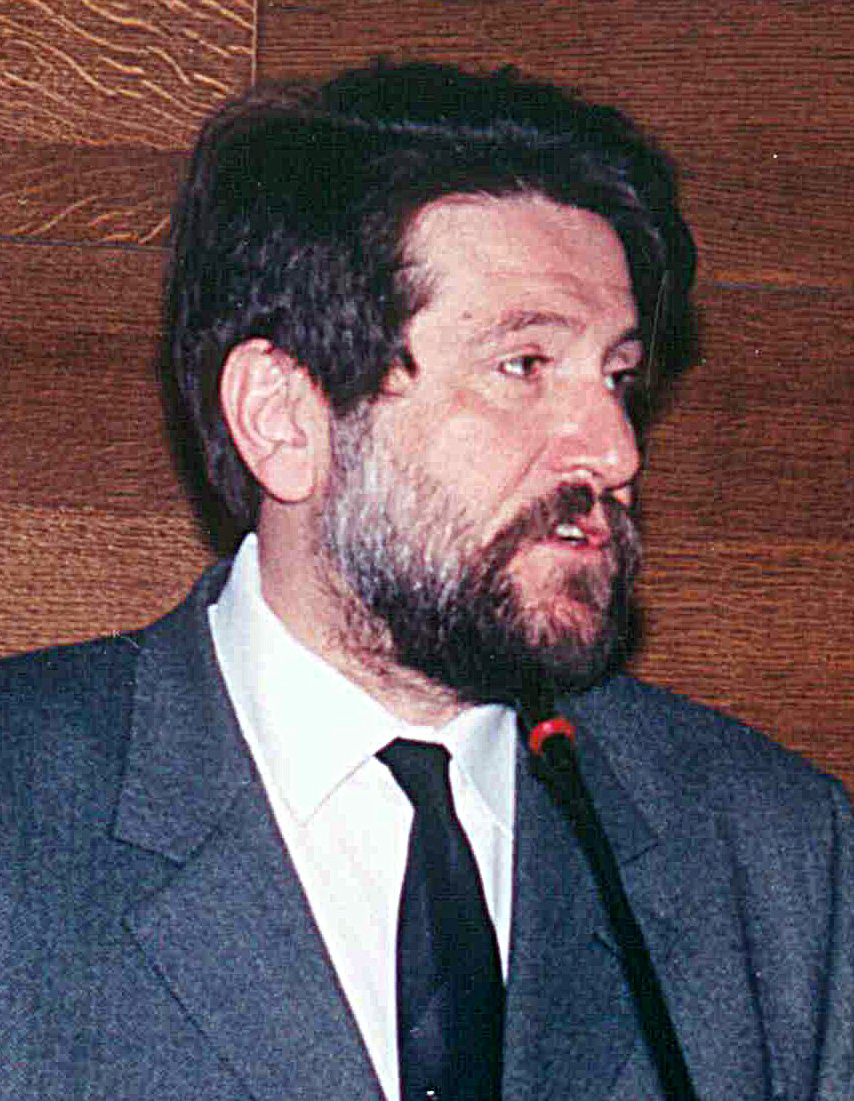
Dragan Veselinov, Leader of NSS

Vojvodina Coalition was founded in 1996 and was composed from 3 main political parties - the League of Social Democrats of Vojvodina, the People's Peasant Party, and the Reformist Democratic Party of Vojvodina, as well as from several other smaller political parties and organizations, including Alliance of Subotica Citizens led by Boško Kovačević and Slavko Parać, Vojvodinian Club, Banatian Forum, and other organizations and movements that advocated peace and civic rights.

Among other goals, Coalition advocated the establishment of full legislative, judicial and executive autonomy of Vojvodina within Serbia as well as equal position of Vojvodina within the Federal Republic of Yugoslavia.

In 2003, the People's Peasant Party and its new leader Marijan Rističević were expelled from the coalition.

== Members ==
| Name | Leader | Main ideology | Political position | MPs (1997) |
|---|---|---|---|---|
| League of Social Democrats of Vojvodina Лига социјалдемократа Војводине; Liga socijaldemokrata Vojvodine | Nenad Čanak | Vojvodina autonomism Social democracy | Centre-left | 3 / 250 |
| People's Peasant Party Народна сељачка странка Narodna seljačka stranka | Dragan Veselinov | Vojvodina autonomism Agrarianism | Centre-left | 1 / 250 |
| Reformists of Vojvodina Реформисти Војводине; Reformisti Vojvodine | Mile Isakov | Vojvodina autonomism Social democracy | Centre-left | 0 / 250 |

== Electoral performance ==
Coalition participated outside bigger alliance only on 1997 Serbian general election, receiving less than 3% and finishing 4th.

=== Parliamentary election ===
National Assembly
| Year | Popular vote | % of popular vote | # of seats | Seat change | Status |
|---|---|---|---|---|---|
| 1997 | 112,589 | 2.72% | 4 / 250 | ▲4 | opposition |

=== Presidential election ===
President of Serbia
| Election year | # | Candidate | 1st round votes | % | 2nd round votes | % | Notes |
|---|---|---|---|---|---|---|---|
| 1997 | 4th | Mile Isakov | 111,166 | 2.43 | — | — | Election declared invalid due to low turnout |

== Political leaders ==
Leaders of the Vojvodina Coalition were Dragan Veselinov, Mile Isakov, and Nenad Čanak.
