= Dragan Glamočić =

Prime Minister of Serbia since 2025

- Драган Гламочић
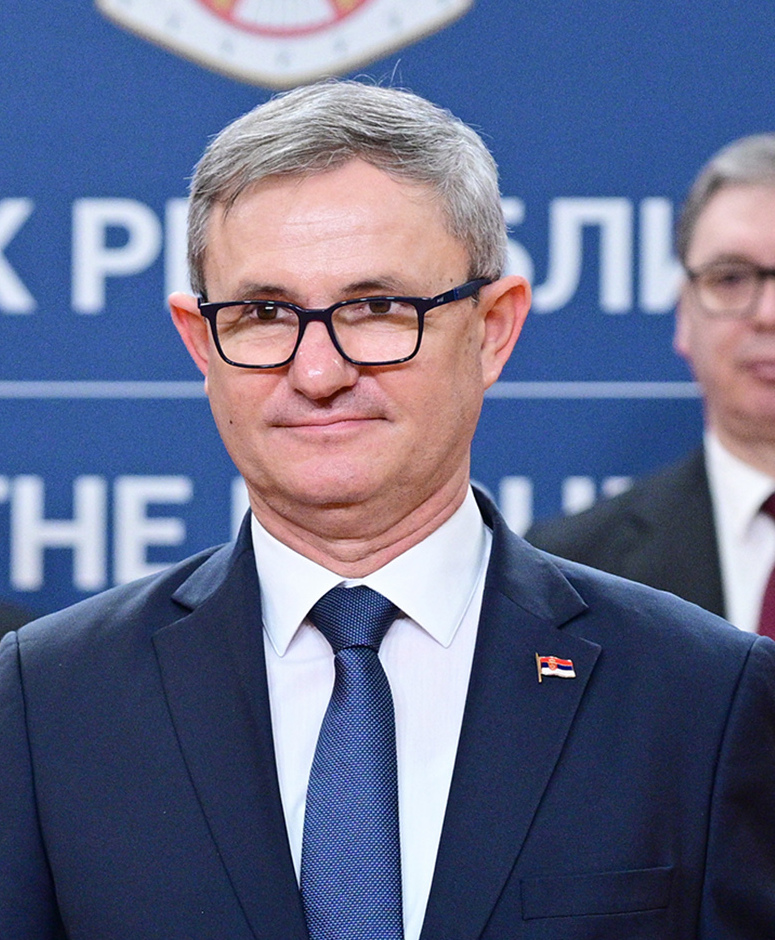
- Glamočić in 2026

Minister of Agriculture, Forestry and Water Economy
- Incumbent
- Assumed office 16 April 2025
- Prime Minister: Đuro Macut
- Preceded by: Aleksandar Martinović
- In office 2 September 2013 – 27 April 2014
- Prime Minister: Ivica Dačić
- Preceded by: Goran Knežević
- Succeeded by: Snežana Bogosavljević Bošković

Personal details
- Born: 4 October 1968 (age 58) Belgrade, SR Serbia, SFR Yugoslavia
- Party: Independent
- Education: University of Novi Sad
- Occupation: Academic, administrator

Dragan Glamočić (Serbian Cyrillic: Драган Гламочић; born 4 October 1968) is a Serbian academic and administrator. He was Serbia's minister of agriculture, forestry, and water economy from September 2013 to April 2014 and was an advisor to the president of Serbia on agricultural issues until returning as minister of agriculture on 16 April 2025.

== Early life and academic career ==
Glamočić was born in Futog, in the city of Novi Sad, in what was then the Socialist Autonomous Province of Vojvodina in the Socialist Republic of Serbia, Socialist Federal Republic of Yugoslavia. He graduated from the University of Novi Sad Faculty of Agriculture in 1992 and later received a master's degree (1995) and Ph.D. (1999) from the same institution. He has worked at the university since 1992 and was named a full professor in the field of animal nutrition in 2009. Glamočić has served as director of the department of animal husbandry and has published widely in his field.

He is the author of the MultiMix and Sesame computer software systems.

== Minister of Agriculture and advisor ==
Glamočić was appointed as Serbia's minister of agriculture, forestry, and water economy in the cabinet of Ivica Dačić on 2 September 2013. In April 2014, he travelled to areas that had been damaged by late snowfalls and criticized farmers who chose not to insure their crops due to Serbia's system of government grants.

Aleksandar Vučić succeeded Dačić as prime minister on 27 April 2014, and a new ministry was introduced. Glamočić was not re-appointed as agriculture minister but was instead assigned as advisor to the prime minister on agricultural issues. He said in March 2015 that Serbia would not permit the cultivation of genetically modified organisms (GMOs) or their use for human consumption, in accordance with the European Union (EU)'s restrictive rules in the area. In the same period, he said that Serbia would no longer permit frozen meat to be sold as fresh in stores. In January 2016, he announced the arrival of the first batch of vaccines for lumpy skin disease in cattle, following their approval by the European Commission. Glamoćić stood down as an advisor in late 2017.

On 19 June 2024, Glamočić was appointed as advisor to Serbian president Aleksandar Vučić with responsibility for agriculture and agrarian reform.

Glamočić has been serving as minister of agriculture in the cabinet of Đuro Macut since 16 April 2025.
