= Aleksandar Martinović =

Serbian lawyer and politician

- Александар Мартиновић
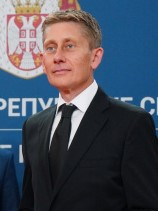
- Martinović in 2024

Minister of Agriculture, Forestry and Water Economy
- In office 2 May 2024 – 16 April 2025
- Prime Minister: Miloš Vučević
- Preceded by: Jelena Tanasković
- Succeeded by: Dragan Glamočić

Minister of Public Administration and Local Self-Government
- In office 26 October 2022 – 2 May 2024
- Prime Minister: Ana Brnabić; Ivica Dačić (acting)
- Preceded by: Marija Obradović
- Succeeded by: Jelena Žarić Kovačević

Parliamentary leader of the Serbian Progressive Party/Aleksandar Vučić — For Our Children caucus
- In office 3 June 2016 – 1 August 2022
- Preceded by: Zoran Babić
- Succeeded by: Milenko Jovanov

Member of the National Assembly of the Republic of Serbia
- In office 16 April 2014 – 25 October 2022
- In office 14 February 2007 – 31 May 2012

Personal details
- Born: 15 June 1976 (age 50) Slavonski Brod, SR Croatia, SFR Yugoslavia
- Party: SRS (1997–2012); SNS (2012–present)
- Education: University of Novi Sad

Aleksandar Martinović (Serbian Cyrillic: Александар Мартиновић; born 15 June 1976) is a Serbian politician. He was a cabinet minister in the Serbian government from 2022 to 2025. He most recently served as minister of agriculture, forestry, and water economy. Before his appointment to cabinet, he served several terms in the Serbian parliament.

Formerly a prominent figure in the far-right Serbian Radical Party (SRS), Martinović has been a member of the Serbian Progressive Party (SNS) since 2012.

== Early life and career ==
Martinović was born in Slavonski Brod, in what was then the Socialist Republic of Croatia in the Socialist Federal Republic of Yugoslavia. He graduated from the University of Novi Sad's law faculty in 1999 and later received a master's degree (2003) and a doctorate (2011) from the same institution. He has been employed in the faculty since 2001, working in the field of constitutional law. Martinović lives in Ruma in southwestern Vojvodina.

== Politician ==
=== Early years in the Serbian Radical Party (2004–08) ===
==== Local politics in Ruma ====
The Radical Party won twenty out of forty-three seats in Ruma in the 2004 Serbian local elections and afterward formed a coalition government with the Democratic Party of Serbia (DSS). Martinović served on the municipal council (i.e., the executive branch of the municipal government) in the term that followed and chaired the SRS board in Ruma during this time.

In 2007, three SRS delegates in the municipal assembly left the party and allowed the opposition Democratic Party (DS) to form a new administration. The SRS-led coalition refused to cede power, leading to a chaotic situation in which both sides claimed to be the municipality's legitimate government. In March 2008, the Serbian government appointed a provisional municipal administration that did not include the Radicals.

The 2008 local elections in Ruma continued the stalemate, with both the DS and the SRS winning eighteen seats. In June 2008, Martinović and local DSS leader Dragan Božić announced a new coalition that would have had a one-seat majority in the municipal assembly. The coalition never came to power; one Radical delegate mysteriously disappeared from the area, and the DSS later withdrew its support. The DS's attempts to form a coalition with the DSS and the Socialist Party of Serbia (SPS) also failed, and the assembly was dissolved for a repeat election in November. By the time the vote took place, the Radical Party had split.

==== Parliamentarian ====
Martinović received the seventy-fifth position on the Radical Party's electoral list in the 2007 Serbian parliamentary election and was given a mandate when the list won eighty-one seats. (From 2000 to 2011, Serbian parliamentary mandates were awarded to sponsoring parties or coalitions rather than to individual candidates, and it was common practice for the mandates to be assigned out of numerical order. Martinović did not automatically receive a mandate by virtue of his list position.) Although the Radicals won more seats than any other party, they fell well short of a majority and ultimately served in opposition. In his first assembly term, Martinović was a member of the committee for constitutional affairs, the legislative committee, and the committee for science and technological development.

He was promoted to the twenty-third position on the Radical Party's list for the 2008 parliamentary election and was again chosen for a mandate when the list won seventy-eight seats. While the overall results of the election were inconclusive, the For a European Serbia alliance led by the DS ultimately formed a coalition government with the Socialist Party, and the Radicals remained in opposition. Martinović served on the committee for constitutional affairs, the legislative committee, and the administrative committee.

=== Radical Party member after the 2008 split (2008–12) ===
The Radicals experienced a serious split in late 2008, with several members joining the more moderate Serbian Progressive Party under the leadership of Tomislav Nikolić and Aleksandar Vučić. Martinović initially remained with the Radicals and was given a more prominent role in the party.

==== Local and provincial politics ====
The Radical Party lost the repeat election in Ruma in November 2008, winning only four seats. Martinović led the party's group in the municipal assembly for the term that followed. He was re-elected at the head of the SRS list in the 2012 Serbian local elections, in which the party increased its representation to seven seats.

Martinović was also the Radical Party's candidate for the Ruma constituency seat in the 2012 Vojvodina provincial election. He finished third.

==== Parliamentarian ====
Martinović strongly opposed a late 2008 draft of the Statute of Vojvodina, saying it was designed to "suppress the Serbian identity" of the province and describing its preamble as "characteristic of a constitution of an independent state." The following year, he opposed an anti-discrimination bill that offered protection to LGBTQ citizens, charging that it amounted to a "persecution of Christians."

He became deputy leader of the Radical Party's parliamentary group in 2009, and some journalists noted that group leader Dragan Todorović was gradually giving him a larger role in the assembly. In late 2009, he travelled to the Netherlands for his first meeting with SRS leader Vojislav Šešelj, who was then facing war crimes charges at the International Criminal Tribunal for the Former Yugoslavia (ICTY) in The Hague. In an interview prior to the meeting, Martinović acknowledged that he had risen to a leading role in the party in a short period of time.

Martinović was appointed as a vice-president of the Radical Party in April 2010. Later in the year, he called for the government of Serbia to reject any direct negotiations with Hashim Thaçi, prime minister of the disputed Republic of Kosovo, on the grounds that direct talks would confer legitimacy on Thaçi's government.

In 2011, Martinović said that the Radical Party could not achieve power on its own at the republic level and should join a coalition with the DS, the DSS, or the SPS. Todorović declined to comment on this statement.

Serbia's electoral system was reformed in 2011, such that all parliamentary mandates were awarded to candidates on successful lists in numerical order. Martinović received the second position on the Radical Party's list, behind Šešelj, in the 2012 parliamentary election. The party's local leadership in Serbia also sought to nominate Martinović in the concurrent presidential election, but Šešelj overrode their decision and selected his largely apolitical wife Jadranka for the role. She received less than four per cent of the vote in the presidential contest, finishing seventh, while the party lost its assembly representation by falling below the electoral threshold in the parliamentary vote. The Progressive Party and its allies won the greatest number of seats and afterward formed a coalition government with the SPS and other parties.

=== Serbian Progressive Party (2012–present) ===
Increasingly dissatisfied with the direction of the Radicals, Martinović left the party to join the Progressives on 4 July 2012. He was appointed as chair of Serbia's privatization agency and as chair of the Galenika supervisory board in 2013, holding both positions until his return to parliament the following year.

==== Local politics ====
Martinović became president (i.e., speaker) of the Ruma municipal assembly in November 2013 and served in the role for the remainder of the term. He headed the SNS list for Ruma in the 2016 Serbian local elections and was re-elected when the list won a majority victory with twenty-six out of forty-three seats. Martinović led his party's group in the local assembly for the term that followed and was not a candidate in the 2020 local elections.

==== Parliamentarian ====
Martinović received the nineteenth position on the Progressive Party's Future We Believe In list in the 2014 parliamentary election and was re-elected when the list won a landslide victory with 158 out of 250 mandates. In the term that followed, he was vice-president of the SNS parliamentary group and chair of the assembly committee on legislative and constitutional issues. He was also a member of the judiciary committee, (Note: Formally known as the Committee on the Judiciary, Public Administration, and Local Self-Government.) a deputy member of the security services control committee, a member of Serbia's delegation to the Inter-Parliamentary Union, and the head of Serbia's parliamentary friendship group with Russia. In May 2014, he endorsed a new Vojvodina statute that affirmed both the province's autonomy and its indivisibility from Serbia.

Martinović was promoted to the seventh position on the SNS list in the 2016 parliamentary election and was re-elected when the list won 131 mandates. He served afterward as leader of the SNS parliamentary group and chair of the administrative committee, (Note: Formally known as the Committee on Administrative, Budgetary, Mandate, and Immunity Issues.) and was a member of the judiciary committee, the head of the parliamentary friendship group with Bosnia and Herzegovina, and a member of the friendship group with Russia. He endorsed Ana Brnabić as Serbia's new prime minister in June 2017, saying that she would continue a path of integration with the European Union while also seeking stronger connections with Russia and China.

On 19 July 2018, while speaking in favour of a proposed new law on organ transplantation, he contended that, "once a person dies, he (or she) is no longer owner of properties, nor his body organs."

Martinović and fellow SNS parliamentarian Sandra Božić went on a two-day hunger strike in May 2020 to protest what they described as the inaction of Serbia's prosecution and judiciary against the violent behaviour of Dveri leader Boško Obradović. The strike ended when Serbian president Aleksandar Vučić urged them to call it off.

Martinović was given the twentieth position on the Progressive Party's For Our Children list in the 2020 Serbian parliamentary election and was elected to a fifth term when the list won a landslide majority with 188 mandates. He led the For Our Children assembly group in the term followed and continued to chair the administrative committee, serve on the judiciary committee, and lead the friendship group with Bosnia and Herzegovina. He received the nineteenth position on the SNS list for the 2022 Serbian parliamentary election and was again re-elected when the list won a plurality victory with 120 seats.

==== Cabinet minister ====
Martinović became Serbia's minister of public administration and local self-government in Ana Brnabić's ministry on 26 October 2022. By virtue of accepting this position, he was required to resign his seat in the national assembly.

While making a presentation to the national assembly in July 2023, Martinović said that he had three children and criticized those parliamentarians who "instead of children, feed dogs, kittens, goldfish, and so on." He specifically lashed out at Democratic Party delegate Srđan Milivojević for not having children. This led to an uproar in the assembly and prompted widespread criticism. Martinović later apologized, saying, "I did not intend to offend the citizens of the Republic of Serbia who do not or cannot have children, and I believe that my speech was interpreted in a completely wrong way."

In August 2023, Martinović promised that the entire territory of Serbia would have access to broadband internet by the end of 2025. He rejected accusations of discrimination against Albanians in Serbia later in the year, saying his ministry was applying the law in an equal manner to all citizens.

Miloš Vučević's succeeded Brnabić as prime minister in May 2024, and Martinović was appointed as Serbia's minister of agriculture in the new administration. In early June 2024, he announced that an agreement on the purchase price of raspberries had been reached with a majority of producers and buyers. Some farmers contended that the price was too low and threatened job action. Martinović also held negotiations over unpaid subsidies and the purchase price of milk early in his term. On 18 July 2024, the Serbian government reached an agreement with seven agricultural organizations on prices and other matters.

In August 2024, Martinović said that Rio Tinto's proposed mining of jadarite in Gornje Nedeljice would not pose a problem for agriculture, citing a study produced by his ministry. He added that the study had been requested by a private company. When asked if the company was Rio Tinto, he did not respond.

== Electoral record ==
=== Provincial (Vojvodina) ===
2012 Vojvodina provincial election: Ruma
Candidate	Party	First round		Second round	
Candidate	Party	Votes	%	Votes	%
Nenad Borović (incumbent)	Choice for a Better Vojvodina–Bojan Pajtic (Affiliation: Democratic Party)	7,389	28.88	11,405	51.67
Rada Maravić	Let's Get Vojvodina Moving–Tomislav Nikolić (Serbian Progressive Party, New Serbia, Movement of Socialists, Strength of Serbia Movement) (Affiliation: Serbian Progressive Party)	5,694	22.26	10,667	48.33
Aleksandar Martinović	Serbian Radical Party	5,195	20.30		
Milutin Hadži Stojković	Socialist Party of Serbia (SPS), Party of United Pensioners of Serbia (PUPS), United Serbia (JS), Social Democratic Party of Serbia (SDP Serbia) (Affiliation: Socialist Party of Serbia)	3,486	13.63		
Dejan Božić	League of Social Democrats of Vojvodina–Nenad Čanak	2,695	10.53		
Slobodan Kosanović	U-Turn	1,126	4.40		
Total		25,585	100.00	22,072	100.00
