= Ministry of Agriculture, Forestry, and Water Management (Serbia) =

Government ministry of Serbia

- Министарство пољопривреде, шумарства и водопривреде Ministarstvo poljoprivrede, šumarstva i vodoprivrede

Ministry overview
- Formed: 11 February 1991; 35 years ago
- Jurisdiction: Government of Serbia
- Headquarters: Omladinskih brigada 1, Belgrade
- Minister responsible: Dragan Glamočić
- Website: minpolj.gov.rs

The Ministry of Agriculture, Forestry, and Water Management (Serbian: Министарство пољопривреде, шумарства и водопривреде, romanized: Ministarstvo poljoprivrede, šumarstva i vodoprivrede) is a ministry in the Government of Serbia which is in charge of agriculture, forestry, and water management. The current minister is Dragan Glamočić, who has been in office since 16 April 2025.

== Subordinate bodies ==
There are several agencies and bodies that are directly subordinated to the Ministry:

- Directorate for veterinary medicine
- Directorate for plats protection
- Directorate for Inland Waterways (Plovput)
- Directorate for forests
- Directorate for agrarian payments
- Directorate for agricultural land
- Directorate for laboratories of the national reference
- Hydrometeorological Institute
- Seismological Institute
- Environmental Protection Agency
- Agency for protection against ionizing radiation and the nuclear safety

== List of ministers ==
Political Party: SPS KV DS G17 Plus DSS SNS n-p

Name	Party	Term of office		Prime Minister (Cabinet)
Minister of Agriculture, Forestry, and Water Management
Veljko Simin (1940–2023)	SPS	11 February 1991	23 December 1991	Zelenović (I)
Jan Kišgeci (born 1941)	SPS	23 December 1991	18 March 1994	Božović (I); Šainović (I)
Ivko Đonović (1934–2006)	SPS	18 March 1994	28 May 1996	Marjanović (I)
Nedeljko Šipovac (1942–2025)	SPS	28 May 1996	11 February 1997	Marjanović (I)
Jovan Babović (born 1946)	SPS	11 February 1997	24 October 2000	Marjanović (I • II)
Živanko Radovančev (born 1949)	SPS	24 October 2000	25 January 2001	Minić (transitional)
Dragan Veselinov (born 1950)	KV	25 January 2001	23 May 2002	Đinđić (I)
Minister of Agriculture and Water Management
Dragan Veselinov (born 1950)	KV	23 May 2002	18 March 2003	Đinđić (I); Živković (I)
Minister of Agriculture, Forestry, and Water Management
Dragan Veselinov (born 1950)	KV	18 March 2003	1 July 2003	Živković (I)
Stojan Jevtić (born 1949)	DS	1 July 2003	3 March 2004	Živković (I)
Ivana Dulić-Marković (born 1961)	G17 Plus	3 March 2004	19 June 2006	Koštunica (I)
Goran Živkov (born 1971); Acting Minister to 20 June 2006	G17 Plus	19 June 2006	9 November 2006	Koštunica (I)
Danilo Golubović (born 1963); Acting Minister	DSS	9 November 2006	14 November 2006	Koštunica (I)
Predrag Bubalo (born 1954); Acting Minister	DSS	14 November 2006	15 May 2007	Koštunica (I)
Slobodan Milosavljević (born 1965)	DS	15 May 2007	7 July 2008	Koštunica (II)
Saša Dragin (born 1972)	DS	7 July 2008	14 March 2011	Cvetković (I)
Minister of Agriculture, Trade, Forestry, and Water Management
Dušan Petrović (born 1966)	DS	14 March 2011	27 July 2012	Cvetković (I)
Minister of Agriculture, Forestry, and Water Management
Goran Knežević (born 1957)	SNS	27 July 2012	2 September 2013	Dačić (I)
Dragan Glamočić (born 1968)	n-p	2 September 2013	27 April 2014	Dačić (I)
Minister of Agriculture and Environmental Protection
Snežana Bogosavljević Bošković (born 1964)	SPS	27 April 2014	11 August 2016	Vučić (I)
Branislav Nedimović (born 1977)	SNS	11 August 2016	29 June 2017	Vučić (II)
Minister of Agriculture, Forestry, and Water Management
Branislav Nedimović (born 1977)	SNS	29 June 2017	26 October 2022	Brnabić (I)
Jelena Tanasković (born 1976)	SNS	26 October 2022	2 May 2024	Brnabić (III)
Aleksandar Martinović (born 1976)	SNS	2 May 2024	16 April 2025	Vučević (I)
Dragan Glamočić (born 1968)	n-p	16 April 2025	Incumbent	Macut (I)

== See also ==
- Agriculture in Serbia
