= Agriculture in Serbia =

Branch of Serbian economy

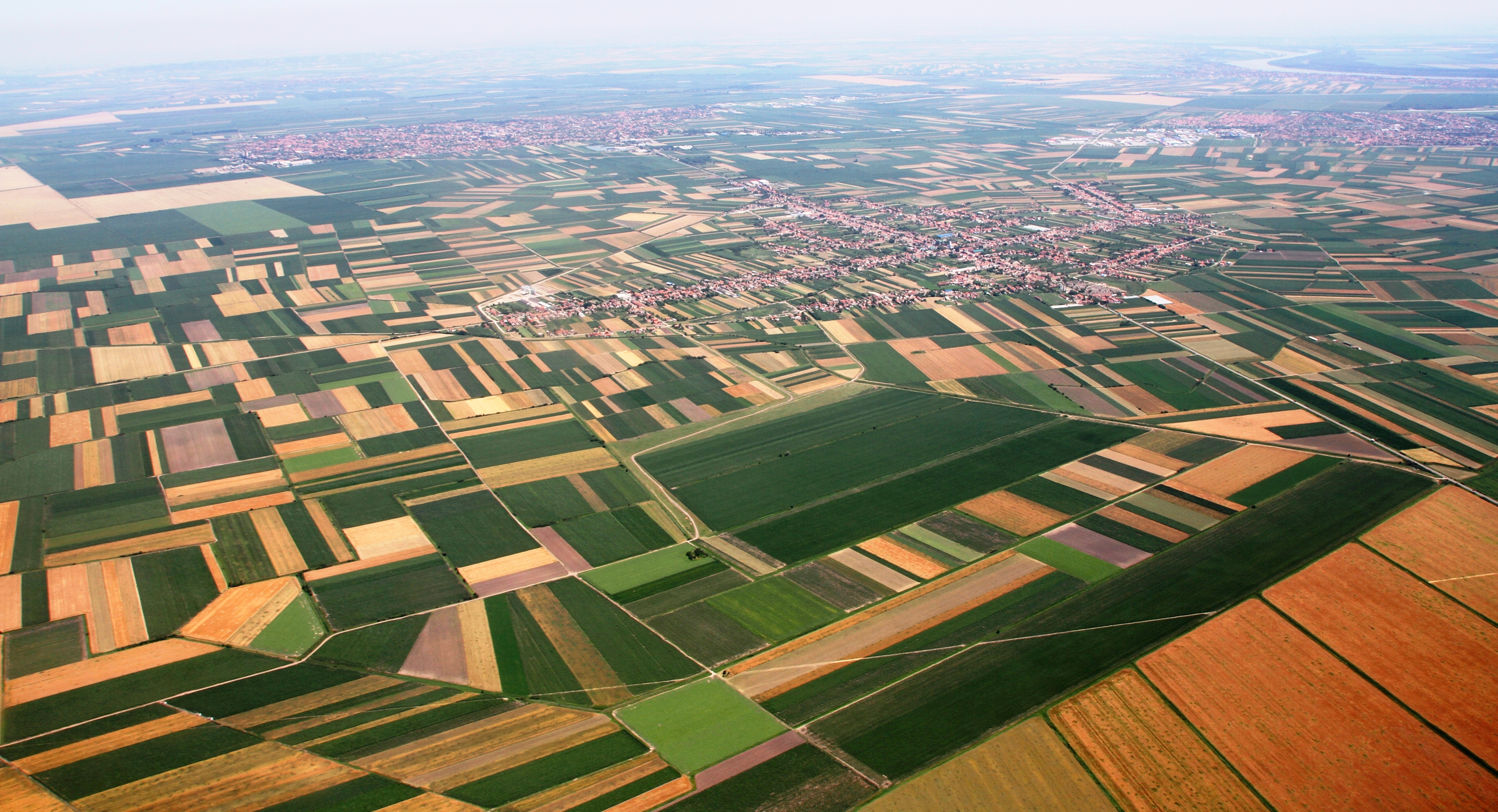
Around 44.8% of Serbia's total area is used arable land

Agriculture in Serbia is an important sector of the Economy of Serbia comprising 6.0% of GDP and is valued at 2.416 billion euros (as of 2017).

There is a total of 3,475,894 hectares of used arable land in Serbia, comprising 67.12% of total arable land available (including land under forest). Agricultural production is mostly present in northern province of Vojvodina on the fertile Pannonian Plain (45% of all used arable land), and the southern lowlands adjacent to the Sava, Danube and Great Morava rivers.

There has been a sharp decline in agricultural activity since 1948, when almost three-quarters of the population engaged in farming, to the present one-sixth. It is estimated that around 1.1 million people in Serbia (15.70% of total population) is employed on agricultural farms, with around 530,000 being employed in farms all-year long (as of 2018). As of 2018, there is a total of 564,542 agricultural farms in Serbia, of which the vast majority of 99.7% are traditional family farms.

== Overview ==
Serbia produces various agricultural products, mostly grains, fruits and vegetables which constitute a significant part of its GDP and exports. Serbia is among the top five producers in the world of raspberries (127,011 tons as of 2018) and plums (430,199 tons as of 2018). It is also a significant producer of maize (6,158,120 tons, ranked 32nd in the world) and wheat (2,095,400 tons, ranked 35th in the world). The production of sugar beet (2,299,770 tons) and sunflower seeds (454,282 tons) meets domestic demand for sugar and vegetable oil and permits export of some 180,000 tons of sugar to the European Union.

=== Fruits ===
Fruit farms cover 182,922 hectares of arable land in Serbia (as of 2018). The following table gives a preview of prevalent planted fruit species by area and achieved production (as of 2018):

Fruit	Native name	Genus	Hectares (as of 2018)	Production (in tonnes, 2018)
Plum	Шљива/ Šljiva	Prunus	72,923	430,199
Apple	Јабука	Malus	26,658	460,404
Raspberry	Малина	Rubus	24,901	127,011
Sour cherry	Вишња	Prunus	19,579	128,023
Blackberry	Купина	Rubus	6,055	35,062
Apricot	Кајсија	Prunus	6,040	25,414
Peach	Бресква	Prunus	5,176	50,249
Pear	Крушка	Malus	4,997	53,905
Hazelnut	Лешник	Corylus	4,564	5,428
Cherry	Трешња	Prunus	4,335	19,153
Walnut	Орах	Juglans	2,796	9,272
Quince	Дуња	Malus	1,947	12,318
Nectarine	Нектарина	Prunus	1,131	23,407

=== Grains ===
Grain farms cover around 1,702,829 hectares of arable land in Serbia (as of 2018), making 66.22% of total used arable land. The following table gives a preview of prevalent planted fruit species by area and achieved production (as of 2018):

Grain	Native name	Genus	Hectares (as of 2018)
Maize	Кукуруз	Zea	900,048
Wheat	Пшеница	Triticum	639,595
Barley	Јечам	Hordeum	102,125
Oat	Овас	Avena	27,125
Rye	Раж	Secale	4,408
Other cultures	Остале културе		29,507

=== Plants ===
Not including grains, there are various agriculture culters being planted on over 869,000 hectares of arable land in Serbia.

Among vegetable, watermelon and strawberry plants, 34,190 hectares that are grown outdoors are produced for use in fresh state, 12,083 hectares are grown outdoors for industrial processing and 3,843 hectares are grown in greenhouses.

Plant	Native name	Group	Hectares
Sunflower	Сунцокрет	Industrial plant	239,794
Fodder	Крмно биље		230,323
Soybean	Соја	Industrial plant	196,902
Vegetable, watermelon and strawberry	Поврће, бостан и јагоде		50,107
Rapeseed	Уљана репица	Industrial plant	45,575
Sugar beet	Шећерна репа		44,898
Potato	Кромпир		27,701
Tobacco	Дуван	Industrial plant	5,244
Bean	Пасуљ	Legumes	5,137
Herbs	Лековито биље	Industrial plant	2,430
Other legumes	Остале махунарке	Legumes	1,409
Pea	Грашак	Legumes	1,228
Flowers	Цвеће		440
Hops	Хмељ	Industrial plant	215

=== Wine ===
Wine regions of Serbia

Serbia is the 36th largest producer of wine in the world. The country has one of Europe's longest history of viticulture and belongs chronologically to the Old World wine producing countries.

There are 21,359 hectares of vineyards in Serbia (as of 2018), producing 198,183 tons of grapes annually (as of 2014). The majority of production is dedicated to local wineries.

Major varieties include the Belgrade Seedless, Prokupac, Sauvignon, "Italian Riesling", Cabernet, Chardonnay, White and Red Burgundy, Hamburg, Muscat, Afus Ali, Vranac, Tamjanika, Krstac, Smederevka, and Dinka.

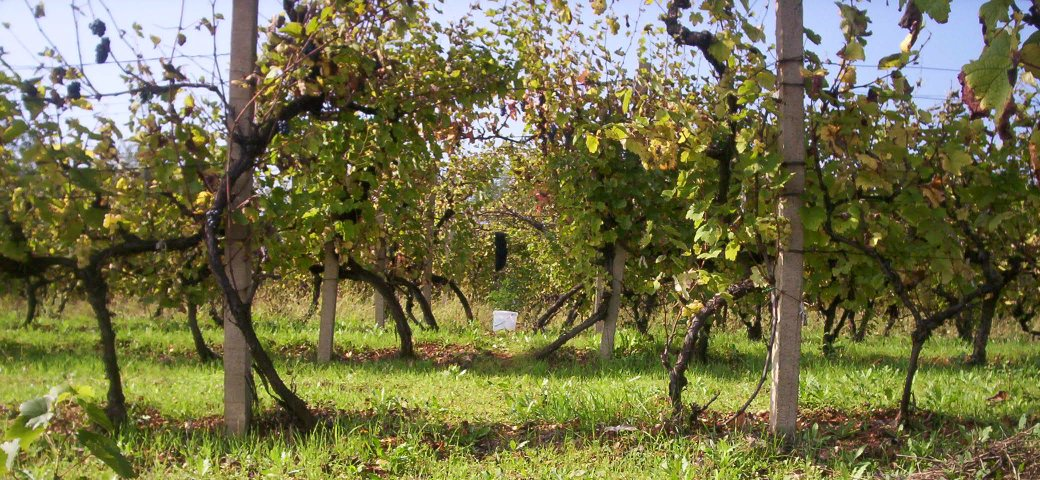
A vineyard near Vlasotince

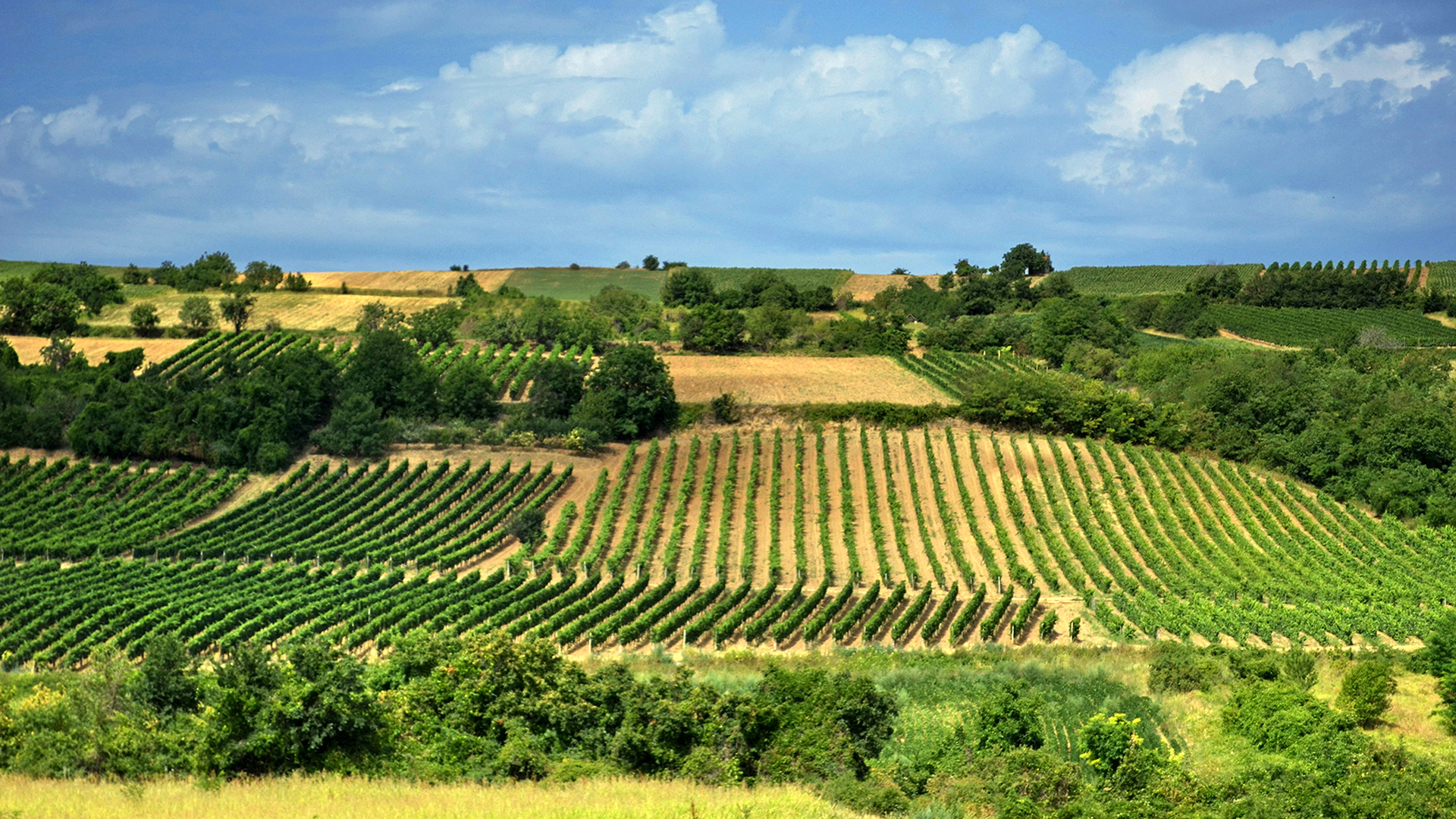
Vineyards in Fruška Gora, near Sremski Karlovci

== Livestock ==
As of 2018, the share of livestock in agricultural production of Serbia stood at 32.6%, with total livestock valued at 1.460 billion euros and annual production value of livestock products being around 450 million euros.

In the total structure of production value of livestock, pigs comprise the most (66.2%), followed by cattle (31.0%), poultry (14.4%) and sheep and goats with 8.4%. As of 2018, there are 23 million chickens, 3.3 million pigs, 1.8 million sheep, 881,000 cattle, 218,000 goats and 15,000 horses. Also, there is an estimated 914,000 beehives, 31,800 rabbits, 4,800 donkeys and small numbers of buffaloes and ostriches.

== Education and Research in Agriculture ==
There are several faculties that offer tertiary education of agriculture to students:

- University of Belgrade Faculty of Agriculture in Zemun
- University of Novi Sad Faculty of Agriculture in Novi Sad
- University of Kragujevac Faculty of Agronomy in Čačak
- University of Niš Faculty of Agriculture in Kruševac

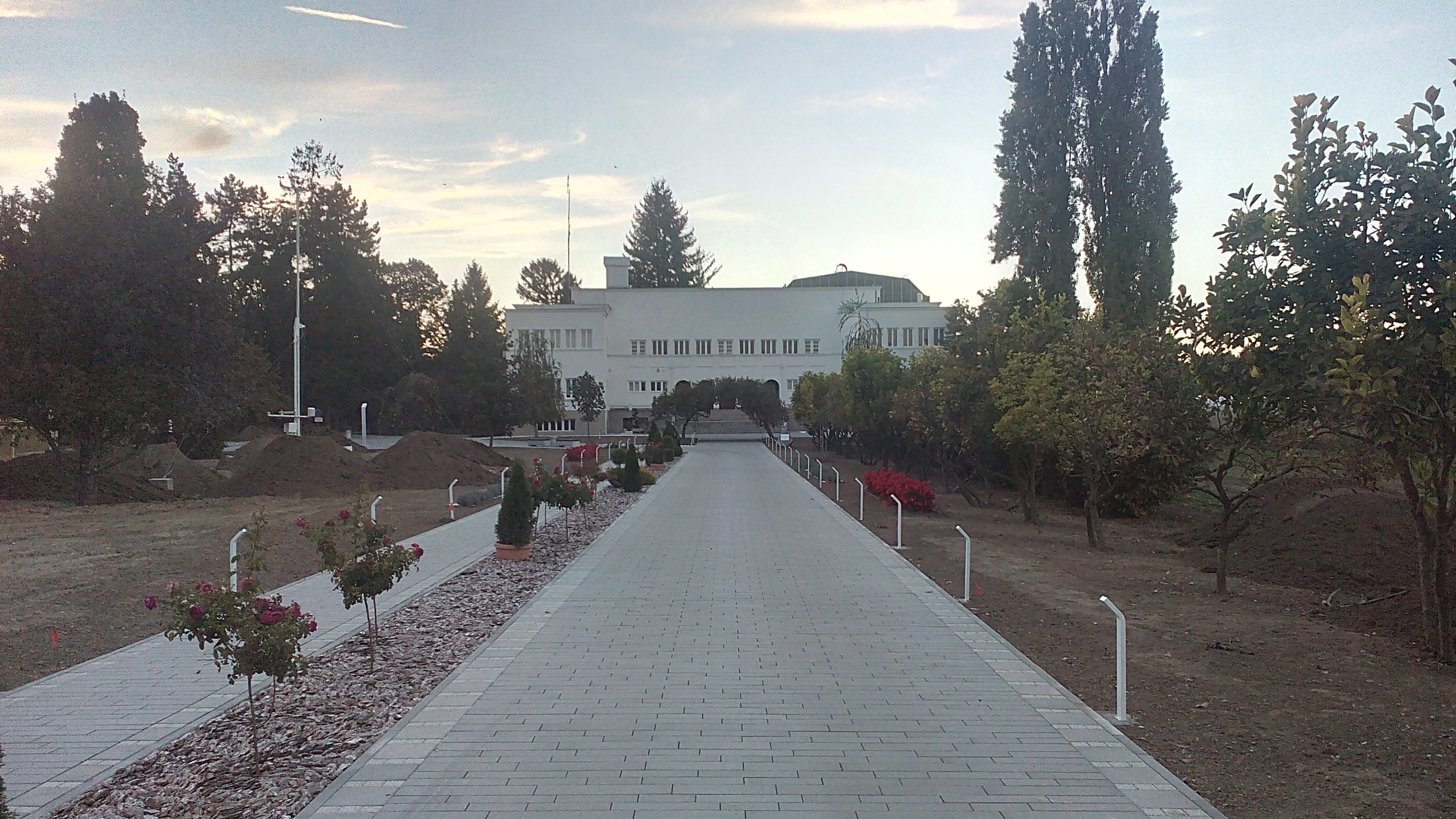
Fruit Research Institute in Čačak

There are several scientific institutes with scope of their activities devoted to the development of agriculture:

- Institute for Medicinal Plant Research "Josif Pančić" in Belgrade
- Institute of Agricultural Economics in Belgrade
- Institute for Plant Protection and Environment in Belgrade
- Institute for Animal Husbandry in Belgrade
- Institute of Forestry in Belgrade
- Institute of Field and Vegetable Crops in Novi Sad
- Maize Research Institute "Zemun Polje" in Zemun
- Institute for Science Application in Agriculture in Belgrade
- Institute of Meat Hygiene and Technology in Belgrade
- Institute of Pesticides and Environmental Protection in Belgrade
- Institute of Agricultural Economics in Belgrade
- Fruit Research Institute in Čačak

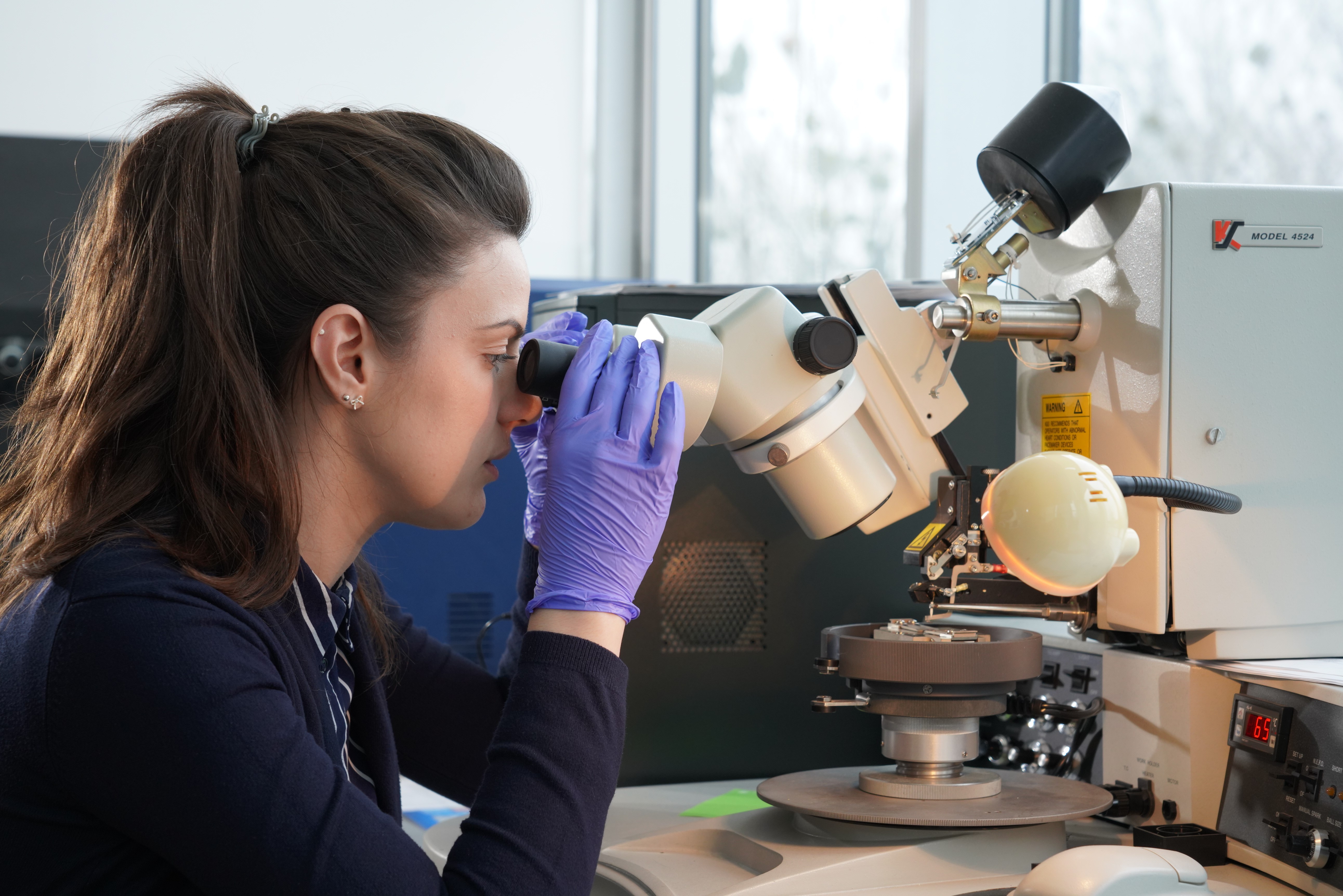
Scientist at the BioSense Institute, 2022

The BioSense Institute in Novi Sad was established in 2015, to develop digital technology for agriculture in Serbia.

== See also ==
- Economy of Serbia
- Serbian cuisine
- Danube Strategy
