= Danilo Golubović =

Serbian politician (born 1963)

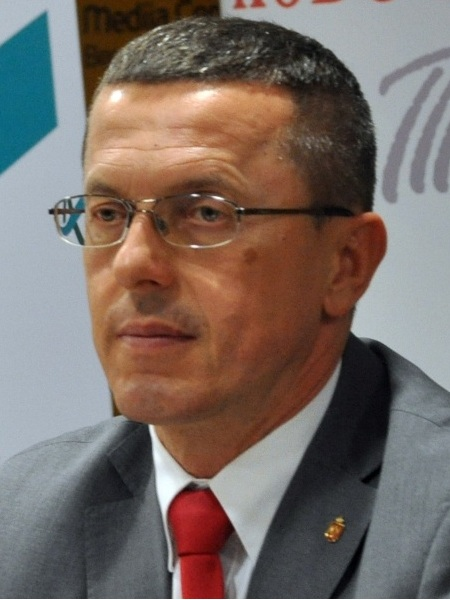
Danilo Golubović

Danilo Golubović (born 21 October 1963) is a former Deputy Minister of the Serbian Ministry of Agriculture, Forestry and Water Management.
