= Nenad Borović =

Serbian politician

Nenad Borović (Serbian Cyrillic: Ненад Боровић; born 4 January 1964) is a politician in Serbia. He has served in the Assembly of Vojvodina since 2008 and has been a prominent figure in the municipal politics of Ruma. A member of the Democratic Party (Demokratska stranka, DS) for many years, he joined the Serbian Progressive Party (Srpska napredna stranka, SNS) in 2019.

== Private career ==
Borović was born in Ruma, in what was then the Socialist Republic of Serbia in the Socialist Federal Republic of Yugoslavia. He has a bachelor's degree as an agricultural engineer.

== Politician ==
=== Democratic Party ===
==== Municipal politics ====
Borović served several terms in the Ruma municipal assembly as a DS member. He was elected to the assembly in the 2004 Serbian local elections, which initially produced a local government dominated by the far-right Serbian Radical Party (Srpska radikalna stranka, SRS). In 2007, three SRS assembly members left the party and aligned with the opposition, which allowed the DS to form a new coalition government. Borović was chosen as president (i.e., speaker) of the assembly. This prompted a crisis in the local government, as the former administration refused to turn over the seals of government or allow the new administration access to the official premises of the municipality. After six months of a stalemate, the Serbian government dissolved the assembly in March 2008 and appointed a provisional administration with Borović as its leader.

The 2008 Serbian local elections did not produce a clear winner in Ruma, and the political stalemate continued in the months that followed. The Serbian government again dissolved the municipal assembly in August 2008 pending new elections and appointed another provisional administration, once again with Borović as the leader. The DS and its allies won a narrow plurality of seats in the repeated elections in November and were eventually able to form a new administration, with Borović again in the role of assembly president.

In 2011, new rules took effect restricting the ability of elected officials to hold dual mandates. Borović, who was also a member of the provincial assembly by this time, was required by the constitutional court to give up one of his offices. He chose to remain in the provincial assembly and to resign as assembly president. (It was subsequently clarified that holding these two legislative offices at the same time was not restricted by the new legislation.)

The DS won a plurality victory with fourteen out of forty-three seats in Ruma in the 2012 Serbian local elections, and the party was again able to form a local coalition administration with Borović as assembly president. There was an attempt to remove Borović and the DS from office in September 2012, but this was unsuccessful. In 2013, however, there was a change in the local administration, and Borović was replaced by Aleksandar Martinović of the Progressive Party. The DS served in opposition at the local level after this time.

Borović appeared in the lead position on the DS's electoral list for Ruma in the 2016 local elections and was re-elected when the list won four mandates. The Progressives and their allies won a majority government, and the DS again served in opposition.

==== Assembly of Vojvodina ====
Borović was elected to the provincial assembly in the 2008 and 2012 elections, in each instance winning in the Ruma constituency seat. The DS and its allies won both elections, and Borović served as a government supporter for his first eight years in the provincial assembly.

Vojvodina switched to a system of full proportional representation prior to the 2016 provincial election. Borović was given the fourth position on the DS's list and was re-elected when the list won ten mandates. The Progressives and their allies won a majority, and the DS served in opposition.

Borović's relationship with the DS leadership broke down in 2019. He opposed the party's decision to participate in a boycott of Serbia's parliamentary institutions in protest against the leadership of Aleksandar Vučić and the SNS, and he was the only DS member to return to the assembly after the initial period of the boycott. During this period, he also accused the DS leadership of covering up financial embezzlement. The DS, for its part, charged Borović with publicly attacking its leadership and accusing party colleagues of non-existent crimes. In September 2019, he left the party to join the SNS.

=== Serbian Progressive Party ===
Borović was given the forty-sixth position on the Progressive Party's Aleksandar Vučić — For Our Children list in the 2020 provincial election and was elected to a fourth term when the list won a majority victory with seventy-six out of 120 mandates. Borović is now the deputy chair of the committee on cooperation with national assembly committees in exercise of the competencies of the province, as well as being a member of the committee on budget and finance.

He did not seek re-election at the municipal level in 2020.

== Electoral record ==
=== Provincial (Vojvodina) ===
2012 Vojvodina assembly election Ruma (constituency seat) - First and Second Rounds
Nenad Borović (incumbent)	Choice for a Better Vojvodina (Affiliation: Democratic Party)	7,389	28.88	11,405	51.67
Rada Maravić	Let's Get Vojvodina Moving	5,694	22.26	10,667	48.33
Aleksandar Martinović	Serbian Radical Party	5,195	20.30		
Hadži Milutin Stojković	Socialist Party of Serbia–Party of United Pensioners of Serbia–United Serbia–Social Democratic Party of Serbia	3,486	13.63		
Dejan Božić	League of Social Democrats of Vojvodina	2,695	10.53		
Slobodan Kosanović	Preokret	1,126	4.40		
Total valid votes		25,585	100	22,072	100

2008 Vojvodina assembly election Ruma (constituency seat) - First and Second Rounds
Nenad Borović	For a European Vojvodina: Democratic Party–G17 Plus, Boris Tadić (Affiliation: Democratic Party)	9,919	36.44	9,017	56.05
Nenad Katanić	Serbian Radical Party	9,214	33.85	7,071	43.95
Smilja Lončar	Democratic Party of Serbia–New Serbia	3,572	13.12		
Stevan Kovačević	Socialist Party of Serbia–Party of United Pensioners of Serbia	2,061	7.57		
Vladimir Racković	Together for Vojvodina	1,307	4.80		
Petar Borović	Liberal Democratic Party	1,145	4.21		
Total valid votes		27,218	100	16,088	100
Invalid ballots		1,046		286	
Total votes casts		28,264	59.75	16,374	34.62
