= University of Kragujevac Faculty of Agronomy =

- Агрономски факултет Универзитета у Крагујевцу
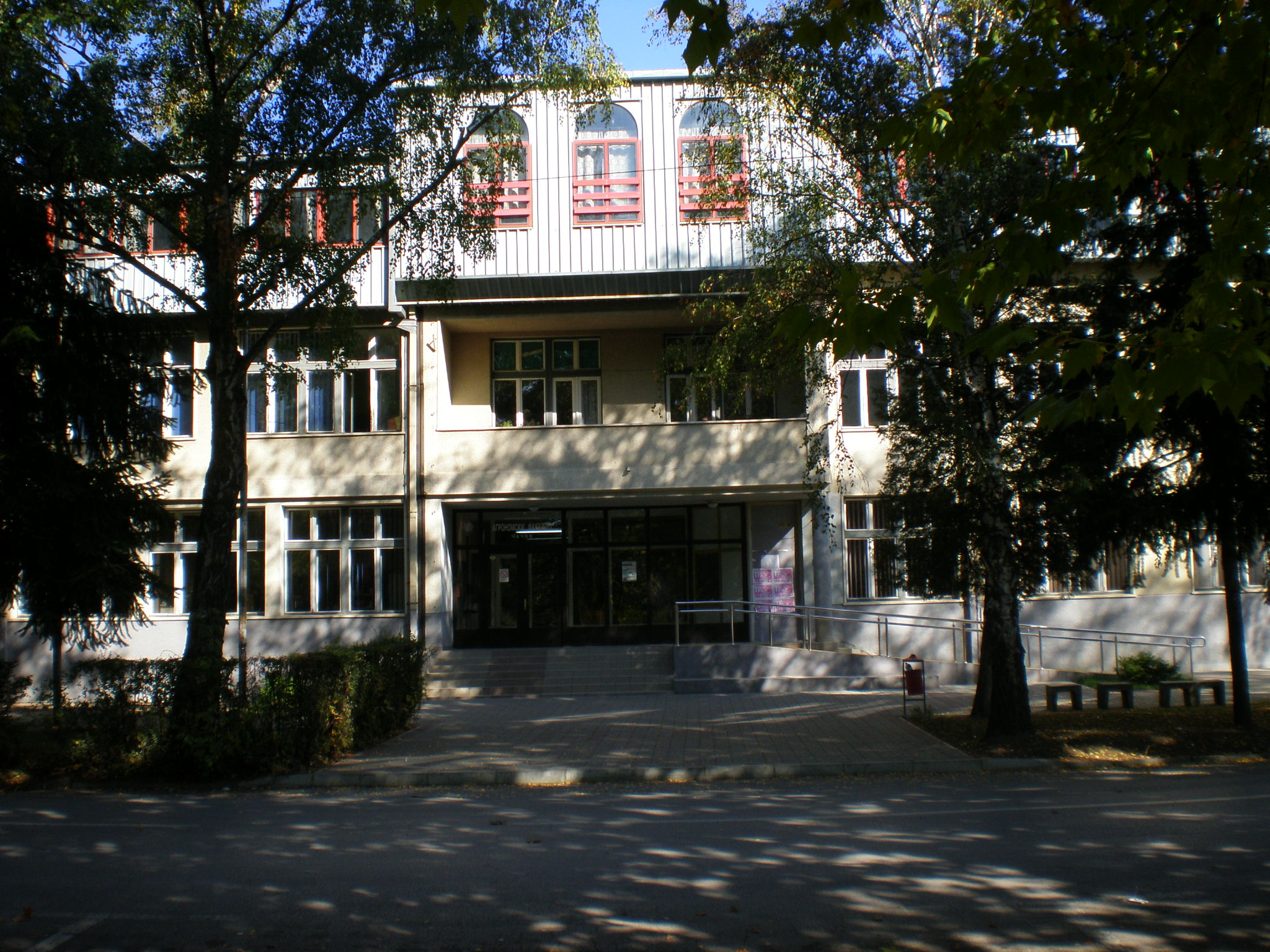
- Faculty of Agronomy main building
- Type: Public
- Established: 9 October 1978; 47 years ago
- Dean: Dr Vladeta Stevović
- Academic staff: 42 (2023–24)
- Administrative staff: 17 (2017–18)
- Students: 364 (2023–24)
- Undergraduates: 262 (2023–24)
- Postgraduates: 81 (2023–24)
- Doctoral students: 15 (2023–24)
- Location: Cara Dušana 34, Čačak, Serbia; 43.896092°N 20.344550°E
- Campus: Urban
- Website: www.afc.kg.ac.rs

The University of Kragujevac Faculty of Agronomy at Čačak (Serbian: Агрономски Факултет у Чачку Универзитета у Крагујевцу, romanized: Agronomski fakultet u Čačku Univerziteta u Kragujevcu), located in Čačak, Serbia, is one of the educational institutions of the University of Kragujevac.

The school's programs cover agronomy, food technology, fruit picking, viticulture, zootechnics and other aspects of the agronomy studies. The school offers undergraduate studies, Master degree studies, and doctoral studies.

== History ==
The faculty began its operations on 9 October 1978. In 2018, it celebrated its 40-year anniversary.

== Notable alumni ==
- Snežana Bogosavljević Bošković, Serbian politician
