= 2002 Serbian local elections =

A small number of municipalities in Serbia held local elections in 2002. These were not part of the country's regular cycle of local elections but instead took place in jurisdictions where the local government had fallen.

Serbia introduced the direct election of mayors via two-round voting in 2002. Elections for local assemblies, which were previously held under first past the post rules in single-member constituencies, were determined by proportional representation with a three per cent electoral threshold. Successful lists were required to receive three per cent of all votes, not only of valid votes.

== Results ==
=== Belgrade ===
==== Barajevo ====
Elections took place in Barajevo on 22 December 2002 to elect a mayor and members of the municipal assembly. The second round of voting in the mayoral election took place on 5 January 2003. When the next regular cycle of local elections took place in 2004, the constituent municipalities of Belgrade were exempted from the direct election of mayors.

2002 Municipality of Barajevo local election: Mayor of Barajevo
Candidate	Party	First round		Second round	
Candidate	Party	Votes	%	Votes	%
Rade Stevanović Kreza	Democratic Party of Serbia, Democratic Alternative, New Serbia, New Democracy–Vojislav Koštunica (Affiliation: Democratic Party of Serbia)	1,295	18.43	2,858	51.25
Dragoslav Jovičić Uča	Socialist Party of Serbia	1,726	24.56	2,719	48.75
Vladeta Vićentijević	Movement for Barajevo	1,156	16.45		
Branka Savić	Democratic Party	881	12.54		
Dragoljub Stanić (incumbent)	Citizens' Group: Dragoljub Stanić–Ilija Dimitrijević	577	8.21		
Milivoje Draganić	Christian Democratic Party of Serbia–For an Independent Serbia	440	6.26		
Biljana Tiosavljević	Serbian Radical Party	304	4.33		
Milorad Matejić	Citizens' Group: Together for Barajevo	258	3.67		
Radiša Stevanović Lube	Serbian Renewal Movement	247	3.52		
Branislav Mijailović	Yugoslav Left	143	2.04		
Total		7,027	100.00	5,577	100.00
Valid votes		7,027	97.38	5,577	98.41
Invalid/blank votes		189	2.62	90	1.59
Total votes		7,216	100.00	5,667	100.00
Registered voters/turnout		19,607	36.80	19,607	28.90

Results of the municipal assembly election:

Party	Votes	%	Seats
Coalition: Democratic Party of Serbia, Democratic Alternative, New Serbia, New Democracy–Vojislav Koštunica	1,545	22.33	8
Socialist Party of Serbia–Slavko Gajić	1,305	18.86	7
Democratic Party–Vladan Ninković	1,260	18.21	7
Movement for Barajevo–Vladeta Vićentijević, Dipl. Inž.	649	9.38	3
Serbian Radical Party–Dr. Vojislav Šešelj	468	6.76	2
Christian Democratic Party of Serbia–For an Independent Serbia	348	5.03	2
Citizens' Group: Stanić Dragoljub-Dimitrijević Ilija–Ilija Dimitrijević	334	4.83	2
Serbian Renewal Movement, Blagoje Tanasković Blaža, Dipl. Elektroinž.	242	3.50	1
Coalition: Civic Alliance of Serbia and Social Democratic Party Together for Barajevo	219	3.16	1
Citizens' Group: Ivanković–Nikolić–Vesna Ivanković	172	2.49	–
Yugoslav Left–Branislav Mijailović	170	2.46	–
Citizens' Group: New Barajevo–Mr. Miljan Mihajlović	163	2.36	–
Liberal-Democratic Party–Bojković Zoran	45	0.65	–
Total	6,920	100.00	33
Valid votes	6,920	95.84	
Invalid/blank votes	300	4.16	
Total votes	7,220	100.00	
Registered voters/turnout	19,607	36.82	

=== Central Serbia (excluding Belgrade) ===
==== Despotovac ====
Elections took place in Despotovac on 22 December 2002, fourteen months after the introduction of temporary measures in the municipality due to local political instability. The second round of voting in the mayoral election took place on 5 January 2003.

2002 Municipality of Despotovac local by-election: Mayor of Despotovac
Candidate	Party	First round		Second round	
Candidate	Party	Votes	%	Votes	%
Miroslav Pavković	Socialist People's Party		24	5,614	52.03
Dr. Sima Janković	Party of Serbian Unity		29.6	5,176	47.97
other candidates					
Total				10,790	100.00

Results of the municipal assembly election:

Party	Votes	%	Seats
Party of Serbian Unity	2,291	19.10	9
Democratic Party of Serbia	2,244	18.71	9
Democratic Party	2,231	18.60	9
Socialist People's Party	1,629	13.58	7
Serbian Radical Party	738	6.15	3
Citizens' Groups (four different lists)	696	5.80	–
Liberals of Serbia	677	5.64	3
Socialist Party of Serbia	604	5.04	3
Serbian Renewal Movement	468	3.90	2
Social Democratic Party	234	1.95	–
Patriotic Blok–Yugoslav Left	183	1.53	–
Total	11,995	100.00	45
Valid votes	11,995	95.76	
Invalid/blank votes	531	4.24	
Total votes	12,526	100.00	
Registered voters/turnout	26,069	48.05	

==== Ražanj ====
Elections took place in Ražanj on 22 December 2002 to elect a mayor and members of the municipal assembly. The second round of voting in the mayoral election took place on 5 January 2003.

2002 Municipality of Ražanj local by-election: Mayor of Ražanj
Candidate	Party	First round		Second round	
Candidate	Party	Votes	%	Votes	%
Životije Popović	Democratic Opposition of Serbia (Democratic Party, Civic Alliance of Serbia, Christian Democratic Party of Serbia)	1,143		2,593	57.11
Dobrica Stojković	Citizens' Group	976		1,947	42.89
other candidates					
Total				4,540	100.00

Results of the municipal assembly election:

Party	Votes	%	Seats
Democratic Opposition of Serbia (Democratic Party, Civic Alliance of Serbia, Christian Democratic Party of Serbia)	1,029	24.21	8
Citizens' Groups (three different lists)	1,021	24.02	7
Serbian Radical Party	373	8.78	3
Serbian People's Party	346	8.14	3
Serbian Renewal Movement	309	7.27	3
Party of Serbian Unity	308	7.25	2
Democratic Party of Serbia	282	6.64	2
Socialist Party of Serbia	246	5.79	2
Yugoslav Left	139	3.27	1
United Peasant Party	87	2.05	–
Social Democracy	55	1.29	–
New Serbia	55	1.29	–
Total	4,250	100.00	31
Valid votes	4,250	94.76	
Invalid/blank votes	235	5.24	
Total votes	4,485	100.00	
Registered voters/turnout	9,631	46.57	
