= Sara Pavkov =

Serbian politician (born 1992)

- Сара Павков
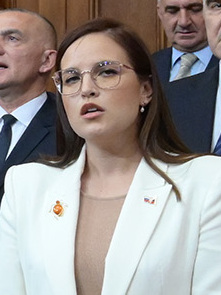
- Pavkov in 2025

Minister of Environmental Protection
- Incumbent
- Assumed office 16 April 2025
- Prime Minister: Đuro Macut
- Preceded by: Irena Vujović

Personal details
- Born: 1992 (age 33–34) Novi Sad, Yugoslavia
- Party: Serbian Progressive Party (since 2012)
- Education: Jovan Jovanović Zmaj Gymnasium; University of Novi Sad
- Occupation: Politician

Sara Pavkov (Note: Serbian: Сара Павков) (born 1992) is a Serbian politician serving as the minister of environmental protection of Serbia since 2025.

A member of the Serbian Progressive Party, she has been a member of the party's presidency since 2021. Before becoming a minister, she was an activist in non-governmental organisations, a secretary for environmental protection in the Government of Vojvodina, and an advisor in the Ministry of Environmental Protection. In April 2025, she was appointed minister in Đuro Macut's cabinet. As minister, she has worked on waste management, improving air quality, and amending the Law on Air Protection.

== Early life and education ==
Sara Pavkov was born in 1992 in Novi Sad, Yugoslavia, and grew up in the city's Telep neighbourhood. She studied at the Jovan Jovanović Zmaj Gymnasium. After the Gymnasium, she enrolled into the Faculty of Sciences of the University of Novi Sad, where she completed undergraduate and master's studies, before beginning doctoral studies. In a 2021 interview with Gradske info, Pavkov revealed that she initially wanted to study at the Faculty of Political Sciences of the University of Belgrade, but that she ended up enrolling at the Faculty of Sciences on her father's recommendation. While studying at the Faculty of Sciences, she received multiple awards.

== Early career ==
After graduating from the Faculty of Sciences, she started working at the faculty. She later became a researcher there. In parallel, Pavkov reported working in both non-governmental organisations, as well as government institutions. She is the founder of the association Zeleni Sad and participated in the Novi Sad working group, Zelena stolica. Between 2013 and 2020, she worked on 20 civil society environmental protection projects. Between 2019 and 2026, the association received din. 9.5 million in subsidies from the government, according to a report by the investigative journalist website BIRN. Pavkov stepped down as chair of Zeleni sad in 2020 and was succeeded by Miloš Stojanović. Despite this, the organisation operated on her property until she became a government minister.

== Political career ==
Pavkov joined the Serbian Progressive Party (SNS) in 2012. As a party member, she worked on Serbia's European Union accession negotiations. She started her government career as a secretary for environmental protection in the Government of Vojvodina. In November 2020, she joined the Ministry of Environmental Protection as a special advisor, before being promoted to chief of staff in June 2021. She co-chaired the 2021 United Nations Climate Change Conference, where she welcomed Serbian president Aleksandar Vučić to the event. In November 2021, she became a member of the SNS party presidency.

The composition of Đuro Macut's cabinet was revealed on 14 April 2025, with Pavkov announced as the nominee for minister of environmental protection. She was elected minister on 16 April 2025, succeeding Irena Vujović. At the time of her appointment, she was the youngest minister in Macut's cabinet. As minister, she stated that she would prioritise climate change, air pollution, and environmental protection. In an interview with the newspaper Blic, she outlined plans for waste management reform, wastewater treatment, improved air quality, and expanded protected areas. She also stated that the government intended to reconstruct seven wastewater treatment plants and amend the Law on Air Protection, which had not been updated since 2009, and noted progress in closing Chapter 27 of Serbia's European Union accession negotiations. In an interview with Radio Television of Serbia, she stated that the amended Law on Air Protection would impose stricter penalties for violations.

The Ministry of Environmental Protection confirmed that it allocated funds for afforestation and greening in 28 municipalities in September 2025. In October 2025, she stated that the Pioneers Park had not experienced environmental damage since the creation of Ćacilend, a claim disputed by media reports. The N1 television has reported that since the creation of Ćacilend in March 2025, greenery has been destroyed and the amount of waste has increased in the park. In the same month, her ministry allocated air-quality monitoring stations for 28 municipalities. A month later, the European Investment Bank and the Ministry of Environmental Protection signed a €35.5 million deal for the creation of a sewerage network in Borča. In December 2025, she promoted changes to the Law on Waste Management in a Blic article, and declared that her ministry would work on increasing funds for the care of protected areas.

The ministry's budget for 2026 was set at din. 25.6 million. Pavkov announced in April 2026 that her ministry would also work on water protection, stating that it plays a key role in mitigating climate change. She stated that the government intended to reconstruct related to sewerage networks and water purification. Serbia is scheduled to host the World Environment Day in 2027.

== Personal life ==
Besides her native Serbian, she speaks English and German. She practiced karate for 13 years. She has co-authored 11 academic papers about environmental protection.
