= People's Peasant Party =

Political party in Serbia

People's Peasant Party Народна сељачка странка
- Abbreviation: NSS
- President: Marijan Rističević
- Founder: Dragan Veselinov
- Founded: 20 May 1990; 36 years ago
- Headquarters: Trg Slobode, Inđija
- Ideology: Agrarianism; Conservatism
- Political position: Right-wing
- National affiliation: United Serbia
- Colours: Blue
- National Assembly: 1 / 250
- Assembly of Vojvodina: 0 / 120
- City Assembly of Belgrade: 0 / 110

Website
- nss.org.rs

The People's Peasant Party (Serbian: Народна сељачка странка, romanised: Narodna seljačka stranka, abbr. NSS) is an agrarian political party in Serbia. Founded in 1990 by Dragan Veselinov as a Vojvodina autonomist party, it has been led by Marijan Rističević since 2002. Since 2012, it has run on the electoral lists led by the Serbian Progressive Party (SNS), most recently on "Aleksandar Vučić – United Serbia" in the 2026 parliamentary election.

== History ==
The NSS was founded in 1990, with Dragan Veselinov as its first president. At the time, its policies were Vojvodina autonomist and social democratic.

In the 1990 election it won one seat. In the 1992 election it entered into a coalition with the League of Social Democrats of Vojvodina (LSV), as well as Serbian successors to Union of Reform Forces of Yugoslavia and Association for the Yugoslav Democratic Initiative, respectively renamed the Reform Party and the Republican Club. The coalition was called the Civic Alliance of Serbia (GSS) and won no seats. The LSV and NSS left the GSS coalition before the 1993 election, which the NSS boycotted. In the 1997 election it was part of the regionalist Vojvodina Coalition and won one seat. As part of the Democratic Opposition of Serbia (DOS), it won four seats in the 2000 election.

Since 2002, the party has been led by Marijan Rističević. In 2003 it was expelled from the Vojvodina Coalition.

In the 2003 election, it was part of the far-right For National Unity coalition which won no seats. In the 2007 election, it ran on the list of the Serbian Renewal Movement (SPO), which won no seats. In the 2012 election, it was part of the Let's Get Serbia Moving coalition around the Serbian Progressive Party (SNS) and won one seat. In the 2014 election, it was not formally in coalition with SNS, but Rističević was elected on its list. The NSS continued to run on the SNS-led lists in the 2016, 2020, 2022 and 2023 elections, in each of which it won one seat. In the 2026 snap election, it again ran on the SNS-led "Aleksandar Vučić – United Serbia" list, on which Rističević was 52nd; the list won 1,731,323 votes (39.48%) and 103 seats, losing the election to the Student List. Rističević was re-elected; his mandate was confirmed on 17 November 2026, and he joined the "Aleksandar Vučić – Serbia is Winning" parliamentary group in the 15th National Assembly.

== List of presidents ==
#	President	Birth–Death	Term start	Term end
1	Dragan Veselinov	1950–	1990	2002
2	Marijan Rističević	1958–	2002	Incumbent

== Electoral performance ==
=== Parliamentary elections ===
National Assembly
Year	Leader	Popular vote	% of popular vote	#	# of seats	Seat change	Coalition	Status	Ref.
1990	Dragan Veselinov	68,045	1.41%	▲7th	1 / 250	▲1	–	Opposition	
1992	Dragan Veselinov	36,780	0.83%	▼11th	0 / 250	▼1	NSS–LSV–GSS	Extra-parliamentary	
1993	Dragan Veselinov	Election boycott			0 / 250	0	–	Extra-parliamentary	–
1997	Dragan Veselinov	112,589	2.83%	▼4th	1 / 250	▲1	KV	Opposition	
2000	Dragan Veselinov	2,404,758	65.69%	▲1st	4 / 250	▲3	DOS	Government	
2003	Marijan Rističević	68,537	1.82%	▼10th	0 / 250	▼4	ZNJ	Extra-parliamentary	
2007	Marijan Rističević	134,147	3.38%	▲7th	0 / 250	0	NSS–SPO–LS–ŽZK	Extra-parliamentary	
2008	Marijan Rističević	12,001	0.30%	▼10th	0 / 250	0	–	Extra-parliamentary	
2012	Marijan Rističević	940,659	25.16%	▲1st	1 / 250	▲1	PS	Support	
2014	Marijan Rističević	1,736,920	49.96%	1st	1 / 250	0	AV–BKV	Support	
2016	Marijan Rističević	1,823,147	49.71%	1st	1 / 250	0	AV–SP	Support	
2020	Marijan Rističević	1,953,998	63.02%	1st	1 / 250	0	AV–ZND	Support	
2022	Marijan Rističević	1,635,101	44.27%	1st	1 / 250	0	AV–ZMS	Support	
2023	Marijan Rističević	1,783,701	48.07%	1st	1 / 250	0	AV–SNSDS	Support	
2026	Marijan Rističević	1,731,323	39.48%	▼2nd	1 / 250	0	AV–US	Opposition	
