= Dragan Veselinov =

Serbian politician and academic

- Драган Веселинов
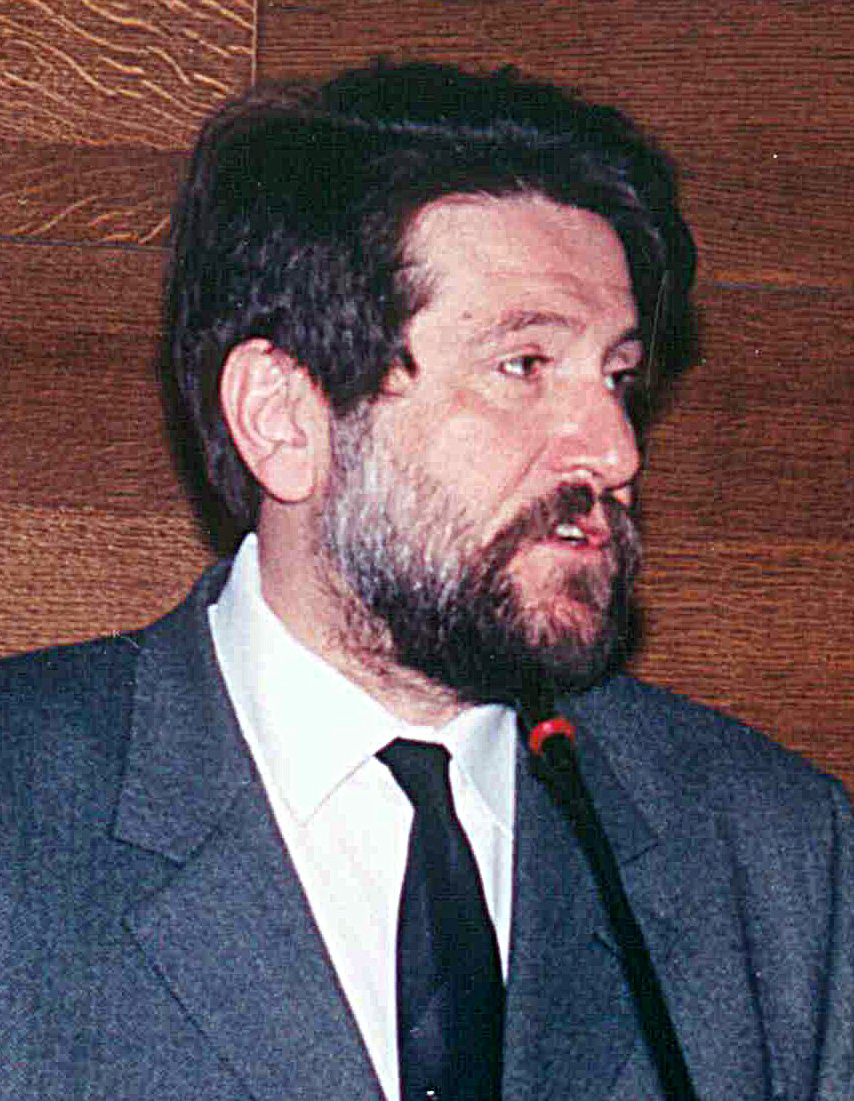
- Veselinov in 2001

Minister of Agriculture
- In office 25 January 2001 – 1 July 2003
- Prime Minister: Zoran Đinđić; Zoran Živković
- Preceded by: Živanko Radovančev
- Succeeded by: Stojan Jevtić

Personal details
- Born: 3 May 1950 (age 76) Baranda, FPR Yugoslavia
- Party: People's Peasant Party (formerly)
- Education: University of Belgrade
- Occupation: Economist, politician

Dragan Veselinov (Serbian Cyrillic: Драган Веселинов, born 3 May 1950) is a Serbian politician and professor at the Faculty of Political Sciences of the University of Belgrade. As the president of the People's Peasant Party (founded in 1990), he was among few Serbians to go openly against the Serbian nationalist policies of Slobodan Milošević and his allies in the early 1990s. He previously served as Minister of Agriculture in the Serbian government. He served under two prime ministers, Zoran Đinđić and Zoran Živković, from 2001 until 2003, before resigning under public pressure when his chauffeur-driven government-issued vehicle struck and killed a pedestrian on a sidewalk in Belgrade.

== Car crash and ministerial resignation ==
On 15 April 2003, around 9:40 am, a government-issued Mitsubishi Pajero SUV with rotating lights turned on—driven by Stevan Bakalov with the Serbian Minister of Agriculture Veselinov and his bodyguard in the back seat—heading down Beogradska Street towards Slavija Square in downtown Belgrade struck a white Mercedes 190 taxi at the intersection with Njegoševa Street, then lost control and ended up on the sidewalk where three pedestrians were waiting to cross the street. The SUV struck the three pedestrians before slamming into a traffic pole and stopping. Thirty-two-year-old pedestrian Katarina Marić died instantly while another pedestrian, Srbislav Ćirić, was injured severely.

Though the cabinet minister Veselinov did not show any intention of resigning initially, however, within two months—facing public pressure and mounting calls from within the government for him to do so—he announced his resignation on 29 May 2003.

The court process started with the district public prosecutor's office issuing an indictment against Bakalov in late May 2004, more than a year after the event. Eventually, on 2 March 2006, Veselinov's driver Bakalov received a five-year prison sentence for "causing the traffic accident". The judicial council presided over by judge Branka Pejović found Bakalov guilty of driving at higher than allowed speed and running a red light. In May 2007, on appeal, the sentence was reduced to four years. Bakalov served his sentence in the Zabela prison in Požarevac.

On 3 March 2009—almost six years after the event and three years after the initial sentencing of Bakalov—as part of the legal process following a request by the victim Katarina Marić's family, Veselinov was questioned on suspicion that he had provided false testimony during the trial, supposedly lying about the car going through the Beogradska-Njegoševa intersection on a green light.

== Works ==
Veselinov has written the following books:

- „Osnovi tehnike i proizvodnje", koautor, udžbenik za I razred srednjeg usmerenog obrazovanja, Naučna knjiga, Belgrade, 1977.and 1982
- „Podruštvljavanje poljoprivrede", Srpska akademija nauka i umetnosti, Belgrade, 1986.
- „Agrarno pitanje u Jugoslaviji", Borba, Belgrade, 1981.
- „Sumrak seljaštva", Ekonomika, Belgrade, 1987.
- „Stotinu udaraca", Svjetlost, Sarajevo, 1991.
- „Politička ekonomija", udžbenik, Čigoja štampa, Belgrade, 1997 – 2016 (15 editions)
- „Muhamed na Isusovom krstu – politička ekonomija islama", 2009 – 2018 (8 editions)
