= Branislav Nedimović =

Serbian politician (born 1977)

- Бранислав Недимовић
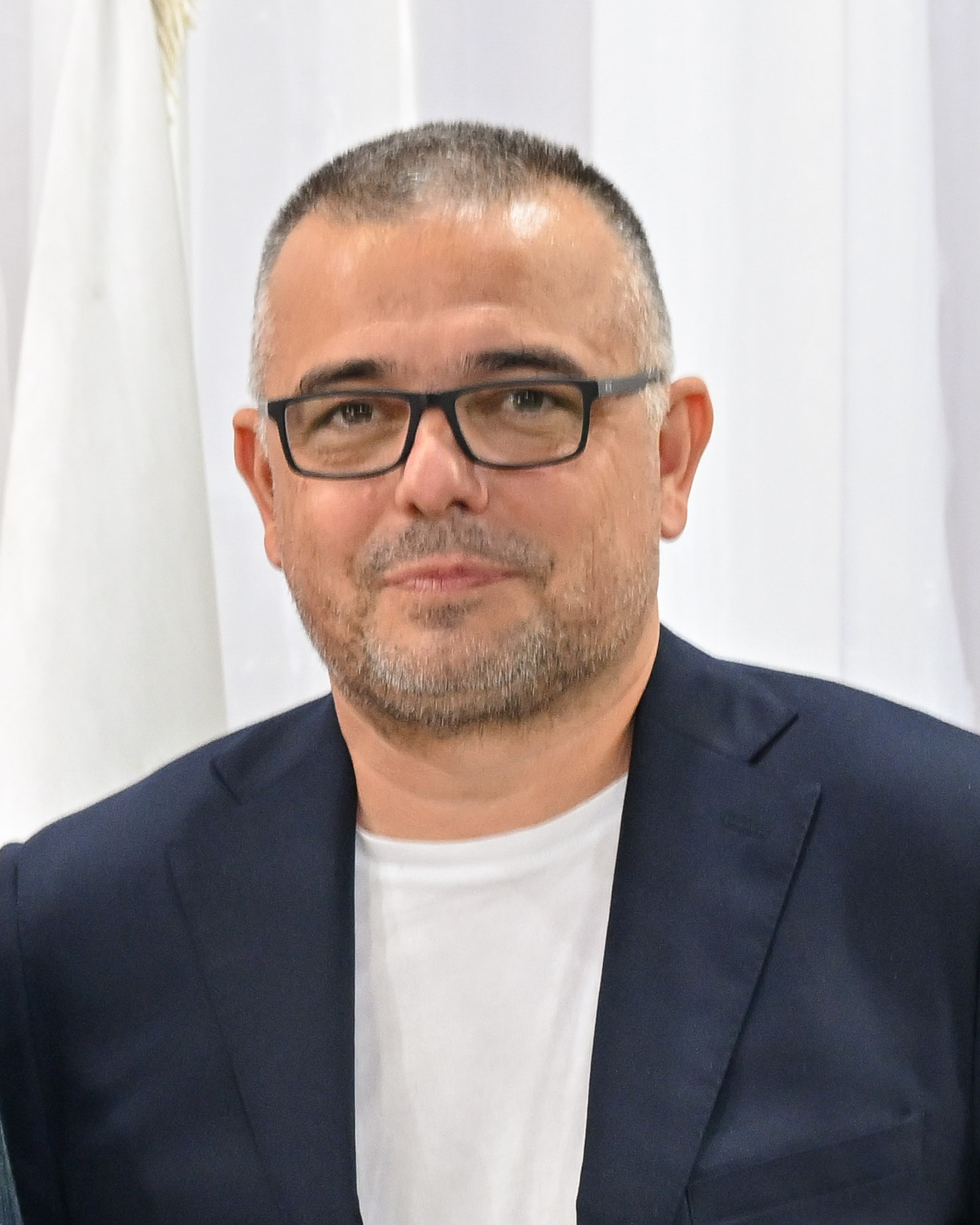
- Nedimović in 2024

Mayor of Sremska Mitrovica
- Incumbent
- Assumed office 2 August 2024
- Preceded by: Svetlana Milovanović
- In office 27 June 2008 – 12 July 2016
- Preceded by: Zoran Miščević
- Succeeded by: Vladimir Sanader

Deputy Prime Minister of Serbia
- In office 28 October 2020 – 26 October 2022
- Prime Minister: Ana Brnabić
- Preceded by: Ivica Dačić

Minister of Agriculture, Forestry and Water Economy
- In office 11 August 2016 – 26 October 2022
- Prime Minister: Aleksandar Vučić; Ivica Dačić (acting); Ana Brnabić
- Preceded by: Snežana Bogosavljević Bošković
- Succeeded by: Jelena Tanasković

Personal details
- Born: 27 November 1977 (age 48) Sremska Mitrovica, SR Serbia, SFR Yugoslavia
- Party: DSS (until 2008); DS (2010–2011); SNS (2015–present)
- Education: University of Novi Sad
- Occupation: Politician

Branislav Nedimović (Serbian Cyrillic: Бранислав Недимовић; born 27 November 1977) is a Serbian politician who served as Mayor of Sremska Mitrovica since 2024, having previously served in that role from 2008 to 2016 as a member of the Serbian Progressive Party (SNS), he previously served as the Deputy Prime Minister of Serbia from 2020 to 2022 and as Minister of Agriculture, Forestry and Water Economy from 2016 to 2022.

== Biography ==
Branislav Nedimović was born on 27 November 1977 in Sremska Mitrovica, SR Serbia, SFR Yugoslavia. Nedimović completed elementary school in his hometown and later enrolled in the Mitrovica Gymnasium. He graduated from the University of Novi Sad, Faculty of Law with a bachelor's degree.

He was elected a Member of the National Assembly of the Republic of Serbia in 2003 as a member of the Democratic Party of Serbia. He was re-elected MP in 2008, but resigned due to accepting the position of the mayor of Sremska Mitrovica. He left the Democratic Party of Serbia in the same year, and was active in the "Mitrovica European Region" movement, which has had cooperation with the Democratic Party (not the same as the Democratic Party of Serbia) since 2009 which he joined at the end of 2010. He served as the mayor of Sremska Mitrovica until 2016.

In 2015, he joined the Serbian Progressive Party, and since 2016 he has been a member of the presidency. He is also the Vice President of the board of directors of the National Alliance for Local and Economic Development.

On 11 August 2016, he was appointed as a Minister of Agriculture, Forestry and Water Economy in Vučić's administration.

In February 2017, the Prime Minister of Serbia Aleksandar Vučić declared that he will run for president at the 2017 Serbian presidential elections. He won the elections in the first round beating Saša Janković with 55.06% of the votes and was sworn in as the President of Serbia on 31 May 2017. Weeks later, he gave mandate to Ana Brnabić to form the new cabinet. On 29 June 2017, the cabinet of Ana Brnabić was formed, with Nedimović keeping his office.

In April 2020, he was named as the head of the Serbian Crisis Staff for Nišava and Toplica District to combat the COVID-19 pandemic.

He was selected as a ballot carrier for the Serbian Progressive Party for the 2020 Serbian parliamentary election.

In February 2023, voiced his support for Dragan Džajić in elections for the president of Football Association of Serbia. After Džajić's victory, Nedimović was appointed Vice President of the association. On 27 June 2024 he resigned from his position after Serbia failed to advance in the 2024 European Football Championship, finishing last in Group C.

On 2 August 2024 he was elected mayor of Sremska Mitrovica.

On March 15, 2025, during the protests against President Aleksandar Vučić, Nedimović was present in Pionirski Park, where demonstrators gathered following allegations of government misconduct. Upon returning to his office, he was met by an angry crowd of locals expressing their discontent. Some individuals voiced their anger through insults, with reports indicating that a few also spat on Branislav Nedimović as a sign of protest.

== Personal life ==
Nedimović has been playing football since elementary school, and currently plays for FK Sloga Zasavica in the Sremska Mitrovica League. Among all registered UEFA players, except for Branislav Nedimović, there is no minister of any government in Europe to officially play football for a team competing in an organized league. Nedimović is married and has two children.

Government offices
Preceded by Snežana Bogosavljević Bošković	Minister of Agriculture, Forestry and Water Economy; 2016–2022	Succeeded by Jelena Tanasković
