= Marijan Rističević =

Serbian politician

- Маријан Ристичевић
- Rističević in 2026

Member of National Assembly
- Incumbent
- Assumed office 16 April 2014

Personal details
- Born: 1 March 1958 (age 68) Novi Karlovci, FPR Yugoslavia
- Party: People's Peasant Party
- Occupation: Politician

Marijan Rističević (Serbian Cyrillic: Маријан Ристичевић, born 1 March 1958) is a Serbian politician and leader of the People's Peasant Party. He has been a member of the National Assembly of Serbia since 2014.

== Political career ==
He was a presidential candidate in the 2004 Serbian presidential election, when he won 0.33% of votes. He was one of the candidates in the 2008 Serbian presidential election when he won only 0.45% of votes. He then threw his support to Tomislav Nikolić in the second round of voting. Rističević portrays himself as a colorful but uneducated peasant, and has gained notoriety in Serbian public because of that image. At one instance, he parked his tractor in front of the building of the National Assembly.

He has been the president of People's Peasant Party since 1990. In the 2003 Serbian parliamentary election the party in coalition with Party of Serbian Unity and others won 1.79% of the total vote.
