= Socialist People's Party (Serbia) =

Socialist People's Party Социјалистичка народна странка Socijalistička narodna stranka
- Abbreviation: SNS
- President: Branislav Ivković (until 2004)
- Founded: 2003
- Dissolved: 2010
- Ideology: Social democracy
- Political position: Centre-left

Website
- www.sns.org.yu (archived)

The Socialist People's Party (Serbian Cyrillic: Социјалистичка народна странка, romanized: Socijalistička narodna stranka, abbr. SNS) was a political party in Serbia led by Branislav Ivković, a former member of the Socialist Party of Serbia. Ivković was a candidate in the first round of elections for President of Serbia in 2002, winning 1.2% of the vote. In the 2003 re-run of the previous elections, their candidate was Dragan Tomić, who won 2.2% of the vote. In the final re-run of the elections in 2004, Ivković was again the party's candidate, winning 0.4% of the vote. In the 2006 parliamentary election, the party ran in the coalition of the Party of United Pensioners of Serbia and the Social Democratic Party that failed to pass the minimum vote percentage requirement.

Ivković left the Socialist People's Party in 2004 to join the Strength of Serbia Movement (PSS). Gojko Veličković was chosen as his successor.
