= List of the first women holders of political offices in Europe =

This is a list of political offices which have been held by a woman, with details of the first woman holder of each office. It is ordered by the countries in Europe and by dates of appointment. Please observe that this list is meant to contain only the first woman to hold of a political office, and not all the female holders of that office.

== Albania ==
=== People's Socialist Republic ===
- Member of Parliament – Naxhije Dume, Liri Gega and Ollga Plumbi – 1946
- Minister of Culture, Education and Science – Nexhmije Hoxha – 1946
- Member of the Praesidium of the People's Republic of Albania – Liri Belishova – 1950
- Chairperson of the State-Planning Committee in the Council of Ministers – Petra Dode – 1972
- Minister of Agriculture – Themie Thomai – 1975
- President of the Praesidium of the People's Republic of Albania – Mine Guri – 1978
- Minister of Light Industry – Esma Ulqinaku – 1982
- Minister for Light- and Food Industry – Vito Kapo – 1982

=== Republic ===
- Foreign Minister – Arta Dade – 2001
- Deputy Prime Minister – Ermelinda Meksi – 2003
- Chairwoman of the Parliament – Jozefina Topalli – 2005
- European Integration Minister – Majlinda Bregu – 2005
- Defence Minister – Mimi Kodheli – 2013
- Education and Sport Minister – Lindita Nikolla – 2013
- Minister of Economy – Milva Ekonomi – 2015
- Minister of Justice – Etilda Gjonaj – 2017

== Andorra ==
=== National level ===
- Councillor/Parliamentarian – Mercè Bonell – 1984
- Cabinet minister - Minister for Public Service – Mercè Sansa – 1985
- Mayor – Bibiana Rossa and Lydia Magallon – 1995
- Mayor of Andorra la Vella – Conxita Mora Jordana – 1999
- Representative of the French Co-Prince of Andorra – Emmanuelle Mignon – 2007
- Speaker of the Parliament – Roser Suñé Pascuet – 3 May 2019

=== Individual ministries ===
- Secretary General of Tourism and Sport – Monserrat Roncheras Santacreu – 1985
- Secretary General of the Conceil Generall – Susagna Arasanz – 1991
- Minister for Education, Sport and Youth – Rosa Maria Mandico Alcobe – 1994
- Minister of Finance – Susagna Arasanz – 1994
- Secretary of State for Health in the Ministry of Health and Welfare – Lydia Magallon – 1995
- Secretary of State of Agriculture – Olga Adellach Coma – 1997
- Minister of Agriculture and Environment – Olga Adellach Coma – 1998
- Minister of Health and Welfare – Mònica Codina Tort – 2001
- Foreign Minister – Meritxell Mateu i Pi – 2007

== Armenia ==
=== Kingdom of Armenia ===
- Monarch — Erato of Armenia – 1st century BC & first half of 1st century

=== First Republic of Armenia ===
- Member of Parliament — Katarine Zalyan-Manukyan — 1919
- Member of Parliament — Perchuhi Partizpanyan-Barseghyan — 1919
- Member of Parliament — Varvara Sahakyan — 1919

=== Armenian Soviet Socialist Republic ===
- Deputy Premier Minister – Rema Khristoforovna Svetlova – 1975
- Minister of Trade – Nina Asmayan – 1991

=== Armenia ===
- Ombudsman – Larisa Alaverdyan – 1 March 2004
- Minister of Culture — Hasmik Poghosyan – 8 June 2007
- Minister of Diaspora — Hranush Hakobyan – 1 October 2008
- Deputy President of National Assembly —Hermine Naghdalyan – 31 May 2012
- Leader of Prosperous Armenia Political Party – Naira Zohrabyan – 5 March 2015
- Minister of Justice — Arpine Hovhannisyan – 4 September 2015
- Minister of Culture — Lilit Makunts — 12 May 2018 (Pashinyan government)
- Minister of Labor and Social Affairs — Mane Tandilyan — 12 May 2018 (Pashinyan government)

== Austria ==
=== Imperial ===
- Monarch – Maria Theresia of Austria – 1740

=== Republic ===
- Member of Parliament – Anna Boschek – 1919
- President of the Bundesrat – Olga Ruder-Zeynek – 1927
- Understate secretary for Food – Helene Postranecky – 1945
- Government Minister (Minister of Social Affairs) – Grete Rehor – 1966
- Minister for Foreign Affairs – Benita Ferrero-Waldner – 2000
- Mayor of Innsbruck – Hilde Zach – 2002–2011
- Minister for Justice – Karin Gastinger – 2004
- European Commissioner for Trade and European Neighbourhood Policy – Benita Ferrero-Waldner – 2009
- Chancellor of Austria – Brigitte Bierlein – 2019

== Azerbaijan ==
=== Soviet Socialist Republic ===
==== National level ====
- Cabinet Minister – Ayna Sultanova – 1938
- Deputy Premier Minister – Tahira Tahirova – 1963
- Vice-President – S.M. Mamedaliyeva – 1963
- Chairwoman of the Presidium of the Supreme Soviet – Elmira Gafarova – 1989
- Speaker of the National Assembly of Azerbaijan – Elmira Gafarova – 1990

==== Individual ministries ====
- Minister of Justice – Ayna Sultanova – 1938
- Chairperson of the Committee for Science and Technology at the Council of Ministers – Tahira Tahirova – 1957
- Minister of Education – Sakina Aliyeva – 1958
- Minister of Foreign Affairs – Tahira Tahirova – 1959
- Minister of Higher and Special Education – Zuleikha Ismail-Kyzy Guseinova – 1965
- Minister Social Affairs – L.P. Lykova – 1965
- Head of the Central Committee Department of Agriculture – L.D. Radzhabova – 1971
- Minister of Public Service/Consumers Protection – Zuleikha Mageran Kyzy Gasanova – 1974
- Minister of Trade – Svetlana Chingvitz-Kyzy Kasimova – 1979
- Minister of Foreign Affairs – Elmira Gafarova – 1983

=== Republic ===
- Chairwoman of the National Assembly – Elmira Gafarova – 1991
- Secretary of State – Lala Shevket – 1993
- Minister of Justice – Südaba Hasanova −1995
- Vice President of Azerbaijan – Mehriban Aliyeva – 2017

== Belarus ==
=== Soviet Socialist Republic ===
- Chairman of the Presidium of the Supreme Soviet – Nadezhda Grigoryevna Grekova – 1938
- Public Commisar of Education – Evdokiya Ilinichna Uralova – 1938
- Deputy Premier Minister for Culture – Nina Leonovna Snezhkova – 1970
- Minister of Food Industry – Ionna A. Stavrovskaia – 1980

== Belgium ==
- Monarch (Count of Flanders) – Margaret I – 1191
- Governor (Governor of the Habsburg Netherlands) – Margaret of Austria – 1507

=== Kingdom ===
==== National level ====
- Member of Parliament (Senate) – Marie Janson – 1921
- Mayor – Léonie Keingiaert de Gheluvelt, (Gheluvelt) – 1921
- Member of Parliament (Chamber of Representatives) – Lucie Dejardin – 1929
- Cabinet minister – Family and Housing – Marguerite De Riemaecker-Legot – 1965
- Party leader of major political party – Antoinette Spaak – 1977
- Deputy Prime Minister – Laurette Onkelinx & Isabelle Durant – 1999
- President of the Senate – Anne-Marie Lizin – 2004
- Prime Minister – Sophie Wilmès – 2019

==== Individual ministries or regions ====
- Minister for Flemish Affairs – Rika De Backer – 1974
- Mayor of Antwerp – Mathilde Schroyens – 1977
- Secretary of State for Brussels Region – Lydia De Pauw – 1979
- Secretary of State for the Dutch-speaking Community – Rika Steyeart – 1979
- Secretary of State for Environment and Social Emancipation – Miet Smet – 1985
- Secretary of State for Pensions – Leona Detiège – 1988
- Minister for Budget – Wivina Demeester – 1991
- Minister for Employment and Labour – Miet Smet – 1992
- Minister of Health – Laurette Onkelinx – 1992
- Minister-President of the French Community – Laurette Onkelinx – 1993
- Minister for Social Affairs – Magda De Galan – 1994
- Minister of Transport – Isabelle Durant – 1999
- Minister of Justice – Laurette Onkelinx – 2003
- President of the Parliament of the French Community – Isabelle Simonis – 2004
- President of the Flemish Parliament – Marleen Vanderpoorten – 2006
- European Commissioner for Employment, Social Affairs, Skills and Labour Mobility – Marianne Thyssen – 2014

== Bosnia and Herzegovina ==
- Serb Member of the Presidency of Bosnia and Herzegovina – Željka Cvijanović – 2022
- Chairwoman of the Presidency of Bosnia and Herzegovina – Željka Cvijanović – 2022
- Chairwoman of the Council of Ministers – Borjana Krišto – 2023

=== Federation of Bosnia and Herzegovina ===
- President – Borjana Krišto – 2007
- Mayor of Sarajevo – Semiha Borovac – 2005

=== Republika Srpska ===
==== National level ====
- Cabinet minister – Finance – Petra Marković – 1992
- President – Biljana Plavšić – 1996
- Vice President of Parliament – Nada Tešanović – 2006
- Deputy Prime Minister and Minister of Economic relations and Regional cooperation – Jasna Brkić – 2006
- Prime Minister – Željka Cvijanović – 2013

==== Individual ministries ====
- Minister of Finance – Svetlana Cenić – 2004
- Minister of Self-government – Lejla Rešić – 2010
- Minister of Tourism and Trade – Gorana Zlatković – 2010
- Minister of Sport and youth – Nada Tešanović – 2010
- Minister of Justice – Biljana Marić – 2001
- Minister of Justice (Republika Srpska) – Gorana Zlatković – 2011
- Minister of Planning, Civil Engineering and Ecology – Srebrenka Golić – 2010
- Minister of Economic regional relations – Željka Cvijanović – 2010
- Minister of Tourism and Trade – Maida Ibširagić Hrstić – 2013

== Bulgaria ==
=== Kingdom ===
- Regent – Maria Palaiologina Kantakouzene – 1271 or Irene Komnene of Epirus – 1246 (disputed)

=== People's Republic ===
- Minister of Posts, Telegraphs and Telephones – Tsola Dragoycheva – 1947
- Deputy Minister of Finance – Vera Lukanova – 1954
- Member of the Politburo – Nadya Zenuka Vasileva Zhikova – 1961
- Minister, Chairperson of the Commission for Light Industry – Dora Pavlova – 1963
- Minister of Justice – Svetla Daskalova – 1966
- Minister of Culture - Lyudmilla Zhivkova - 1975
- Minister of Education - Drazha Deleva Vulcheva - 1977

=== Republic ===
- Prime Minister (acting) – Reneta Indzhova – 1994
- Foreign minister (acting) – Irina Bokova – 1996
- European Commissioner for Consumer Protection – Meglena Kuneva – 2007
- President of the National Assembly – Tsetska Tsacheva – 2009
- Mayor of Sofia – Yordanka Fandakova – 2009
- President – Iliana Iotova – 2026

== Croatia ==
=== Kingdom ===
- Regent (for Stjepan Držislav) – Jelena of Zadar, Queen of Croatia – 969 (disputed)

=== Socialist Republic of Croatia ===
- Finance Minister – Anka Berus – 1945
- Prime minister – Savka Dabčević-Kučar – 1967
- President of the Presidency – Ema Derossi-Bjelajac – 1985

=== Republic ===
==== National level ====
- Cabinet minister – Minister for Education – Vesna Girardi-Jurkić – 1992
- President of County house of Parliament (Senate) – Katica Ivanišević – 1994
- Vice Prime Minister – Ljerka Mintas-Hodak – 1995
- Prime Minister – Jadranka Kosor – 2009
- President – Kolinda Grabar-Kitarović – 2015

==== Individual ministries ====
- Minister for Building and Construction – Marina Matulović-Dropulić – 1995
- Mayor of Zagreb – Marina Matulović-Dropulić – 1996
- Minister for European Integration – Ljerka Mintas-Hodak – 1998
- Minister for Science – Milena Žic-Fuchs – 1999
- Minister for Health – Ana Stavljenić-Rukavina – 2000
- Minister for Tourism – Pave Župan-Rusković – 2000
- Minister for Justice – Ingrid Antičević-Marinović – 2001
- Minister for Defence – Željka Antunović – 2002
- Minister without portfolio – Gordana Sobol – 2002
- Minister for Foreign Affairs – Kolinda Grabar-Kitarović – 2005
- Minister for Finance – Martina Dalić – 2010

== Cyprus ==
=== Kingdom ===
- Regent – Alice of Champagne – 1218
- Monarch – Charlotte of Cyprus – 1458

=== Republic ===
- Member of the Turkish Communal Chamber – Kadriye Hulusi Hacıbulgur – 1960
- Minister of Justice and Public Order – Stella Soulioti – 1960
- Member of the House of Representatives – Ayla Halit Kazım – 1963
- Mayor of Nicosia – Eleni Mavrou – 2006
- Foreign Minister – Erato Kozakou-Marcoullis – 2007
- European Commissioner for Education, Culture, Multilingualism and Youth – Androulla Vassiliou – 2010

=== Northern Cyprus ===
unrecognized, secessionist state

- Minister of Economy and Finance – Onur Boman – 1993
- Prime Minister – Sibel Siber – 2013
- Foreign Minister – Emine Çolak – 2015

== Czech Republic ==
=== Duchy of Bohemia ===
- Regent – Ludmila of Bohemia, Duchess Regent of Bohemia – 921

=== Kingdom of Bohemia ===
- Monarch – Maria Theresa – 1740

=== Czechoslovakia (1918–1992) ===
==== National level ====
- Members of the first National Assembly: – Božena Ecksteinová, Anna Chlebounová, Irena Káňová, Františka Kolaříková, Luisa Landová-Štychová, Alice Masaryková, Eliška Purkyňová, Božena Viková-Kunětická, Ludmila Zatloukalová-Coufalová, Františka Zeminová – 1918
- Deputy Speaker of the National Assembly – Anežka Hodinová-Spurná – 1945
- Minister of Industry – Ludmila Jankovcová – 1947
- Deputy Prime Minister – Ludmila Jankovcová – 1954
- Speaker of the Chamber of People of the Federal Assembly – Soňa Pennigerová – 1969
- Deputy Speaker of the Chamber of People of the Federal Assembly – Eva Železníková – 1986
- Deputy Speaker of the Chamber of Nations of the Federal Assembly – Blanka Hyková – 1989

==== Individual Ministries ====
- Minister of Consumer Industry – Božena Machačová-Dostálová – 1954
- Minister of Post and Telecommunication – Růžena Urbánková – 1969
- Minister of State Audit – Květoslava Kořínková – 1989

=== Czech Republic (1992–onward) ===
==== National level ====
- Deputy Speaker of the Chamber of Deputies – Petra Buzková – 1996
- Vice-President of the Senate – Jaroslava Moserová – 1996
- Cabinet minister – Minister of Justice – Vlasta Parkanová – 1997
- President of the Senate – Libuše Benešová – 1998
- Vice-President of the Senate – Alena Gajdůšková – 2008
- Governor - Plzeň Region – Milada Emmerová – 2008
- Deputy Prime Minister – Vlasta Parkanová – 2009
- Speaker of the Chamber of Deputies – Miroslava Němcová – 2010
- Mayor of Prague (capital) – Adriana Krnáčová – 2014
- European Commissioner for Justice and Consumers – Věra Jourová – 2014

==== Individual ministries or regions ====
- Minister of Health – Zuzana Roithová – 1998
- Minister of Education, Youth and Sport – Petra Buzková – 2002
- Minister of Information Technologies – Dana Bérová – 2005
- Minister of Agriculture – Milena Vicenová – 2006
- Minister of Culture – Helena Třeštíková – 2007
- Minister of Defense – Vlasta Parkanová – 2007
- Minister without Portfolio – Džamila Stehlíková – 2007
- Governor of Ústí nad Labem Region – Jana Vaňhová – 2008
- Minister of Environment – Rut Bízková – 2010
- Governor of Central Bohemian Region – Zuzana Moravčíková – 2012
- Minister of Labour and Social Affairs – Ludmila Müllerová – 2012
- Minister of Regional Development – Věra Jourová – 2014
- Governor of Karlovy Vary Region – Jana Vildumetzová – 2016

== Denmark ==
=== National level ===
- Regent – Margaret Sambiria – 1259
- Monarch – Margaret I – 1387
- Cabinet minister – Education – Nina Bang – 1924
- Speaker of the Landsting, Chamber of Parliament – Ingeborg Hansen – 1950
- European Commissioner for the Environment – Ritt Bjerregaard – 1995
- Lord Mayor of Copenhagen – Ritt Bjerregaard – 2006
- Prime Minister – Helle Thorning-Schmidt – 2011
- Speaker of the Folketing – Pia Kjærsgaard – 2015

=== Individual ministries or regions ===
- Minister without portfolio – Fanny Jensen – 1947
- Minister for Justice – Helga Pedersen – 1950
- Ministry for Justice (Hjørring Retskreds) – Anne Mette Ovesen – 2003
- Minister for Ecclesiastical Affairs – Bodil Koch – 1950
- Mayor of Stege: Eva Madsen (1950)
- Minister for Trade – Lis Groes – 1953
- Minister for Economy – Marianne Jelved – 1993
- Minister of Finance – Pia Gjellerup – 2000
- Minister for Agriculture and Food – Mariann Fischer Boel – 2002
- Minister of Foreign Affairs – Lene Espersen – 2010

=== Faroe Islands ===
- Minister of Economy, Statistics, Transport and Justice – Jóngerð Purkhús – 1989–1991
- Prime Minister – Marita Petersen – 1993
- Speaker of the Løgting – Marita Petersen – 1994
- High Commissioner – Vibeke Larsen −1995

=== Greenland ===
- Foreign minister – Aleqa Hammond – 2007
- Speaker of the Inatsisartut – Ruth Heilmann – 2008
- High Commissioner – Mikaela Engell – 2011
- Prime Minister – Aleqa Hammond – 2013

== Estonia ==
=== Danish Estonia ===
- Regent – Margaret Sambiria of Denmark – 1259

=== Swedish Estonia and Livonia ===
- Monarch – Christina of Sweden – 1632

=== Autonomous Governorate of Estonia ===
- Member of the Provincial Assembly – Anna Leetsmann – 1917

=== Republic of Estonia ===
- Members of the Constituent Assembly – Emma Asson-Petersen, Marie Helene Aul, Minni Kurs-Olesk, Alma Ostra-Oinas, Johanna Päts, Helmi Press-Jansen and Marie Reisik – 1919
- Members of the Riigikogu – Emma Asson-Petersen and Alma Ostra-Oinas – 1920
- Members of the National Assembly – Linda Marie Eenpalu and Alma Jeets – 1937
- Member of National Council (Second Chamber) – Linda Marie Eenpalu – 1938

=== Estonian Soviet Socialist Republic ===
- Minister of Social Welfare – Olga Lauristin – 1944
- Minister of Social Security – Erna Visk – 1958
- Minister of Public Service – Meta Vannas (Jangolenko) – 1967
- Minister of Education – Elsa Gretškina – 1985
- Party leader – Lagle Parek of the National Independence Party – 1988
- Minister of Social Welfare – Siiri Oviir – 1990

=== Estonian Government in Exile ===
- Minister without portfolio (in Exile) – Renate Kaasik – 1971
- Secretary of State (in Exile) – Katrin Nyman-Metcalf – 1990
- Minister of Justice (in Exile) – Aino Lepik von Wirén – 1990

=== International level ===
- European Commissioner – Kadri Simson – 2019

==== National level ====
- Minister of Internal Affairs – Lagle Parek – 1992
- Mayor of Tallinn – Ivi Eenmaa – 1995
- County Governor (Tartu County) – Eha Pärn – 2003 (acting governor until 2004)
- President of the Riigikogu – Ene Ergma – 2003
- President – Kersti Kaljulaid – 2016
- Election-winning party leader – Kaja Kallas of the Estonian Reform Party – 2019
- Prime Minister – Kaja Kallas – 2021

==== Individual ministries ====
- Minister of Social Affairs – Marju Lauristin – 1992
- Minister of Reforms – Liia Hänni – 1994
- Minister of Economic Affairs – Liina Tõnisson – 1995
- Minister of Culture – Signe Kivi – 1999
- Minister of Foreign Affairs – Kristiina Ojuland – 2002
- Minister of Education – Mailis Rand – 2002
- Mayor of Tartu – Laine Jänes – 2003
- Minister of Agriculture – Ester Tuiksoo – 2004
- Members of the European Parliament – Marianne Mikko and Siiri Oviir – 2004
- Minister of Population Affairs – Urve Palo – 2007
- Minister of Environment – Keit Pentus – 2011
- Minister of Foreign Trade and Entrepreneurship – Anne Sulling – 2014
- Minister of Finance – Maris Lauri – 2014
- Chancellor of Justice – Ülle Madise – 2015
- Minister of Entrepreneurship – Ülle Madise – 2015
- Minister of Social Protection – Signe Riisalo – 2021

== Finland ==
=== Swedish Realm ===
- Regent – Ingeborg of Norway – 1319
- Monarch – Margaret I – 1389
- Governor of Turku – Ebba Stenbock (acting interim governor) – 1597

=== Grand Duchy ===
- Member of Parliament – Miina Sillanpää, Alli Nissinen, Hilma Räsänen, Ida Aalle-Teljo, Anni Huotari, Mimmi Kanervo, Hilja Pärssinen, Maria Raunio, Jenny Upari, Eveliina Ala-Kulju, Hedvig Gebhard, Liisi Kivioja, Iida Vemmelpuu – 1907

=== Republic ===
==== National level ====
- Minister of Social Affairs – Miina Sillanpää – 1926
- Deputy Prime Minister of Finland – Tyyne Leivo-Larsson – 1958
- Mayor of Loviisa – Birgitta Landgren – 1973
- Governor of Lapland – Hannele Pokka – 1994
- Speaker of the Parliament – Riitta Uosukainen – 1995
- President – Tarja Halonen – 2000
- Prime Minister – Anneli Jäätteenmäki – 2003
- Mayor of Tampere – Anna-Kaisa Ikonen – 2013

==== Individual ministries ====
- Minister without portfolio – Hertta Kuusinen – 1948
- Education Minister – Kerttu Saalasti – 1954
- Minister of Justice – Inkeri Anttila – 1975
- Minister of Commerce and Industry – Pirkko Työläjärvi – 1981
- Minister of Interior – Kaisa Raatikainen – 1984
- Defence minister – Elisabeth Rehn – 1990
- Minister of Environmental Affairs – Sirpa Pietikäinen – 1991
- Foreign minister – Tarja Halonen – 1995
- Minister of Transport – Tuula Linnainmaa – 1995
- Mayor of Helsinki – Eva-Riitta Siitonen – 1996
- Minister of Labour – Sinikka Mönkäre – 1999
- Minister of Health and Social Services – Eva Biaudet – 1999
- Minister of Culture – Suvi Lindén – 1999
- Minister of Agriculture – Sirkka-Liisa Anttila – 2007
- Finance minister – Jutta Urpilainen – 2011

==== Åland ====
- Lantråd (Premier) – Viveka Eriksson – 2007
- Minister of Migration and European Affairs for Åland Islands – Astrid Thors – 2007–2011
- Member of Parliament in the Åland Islands – Elisabeth Nauclér – 2007

== France ==
=== National level ===
- Regent – Anne of Kiev – 1060
- Minister of Health – Germaine Poinso-Chapuis – 1947 (first government minister; Simone Veil who held the portfolio between 1974 and 1979 is often incorrectly cited as the first officeholder)
- Prefect – Yvette Chassagne (Loir-et-Cher) – 1981
- Mayor of Strasbourg – Catherine Trautmann – 1989
- European Commissioner for Taxation and Customs Union, Audit and Anti-Fraud – Christiane Scrivener – 1989
- Prime Minister – Édith Cresson – 1991
- Mayor of Paris – Anne Hidalgo – 2014
- President of the National Assembly of France – Yaël Braun-Pivet – 2022

=== Individual ministries or regions ===
- Undersecretary of State for national education – Cécile Brunschvicg – 1936
- Undersecretary of state for Public Health – Suzanne Lacore – 1936
- Undersecretary of state for Science – Irène Joliot-Curie – 1936
- Minister of Labour – Martine Aubry – 1997
- Minister of Culture – Catherine Trautmann – 1997
- Minister of Justice – Élisabeth Guigou – 1997
- Mayor of Lille – Martine Aubry – 2001
- Minister of Defence – Michèle Alliot-Marie – 2002
- Mayor of Montpellier – Hélène Mandroux – 2004
- Minister of the Overseas – Brigitte Girardin – 2002
- Minister of the Interior – Michèle Alliot-Marie – 2007
- Minister of Finance – Christine Lagarde – 2007
- Minister of Foreign Affairs – Michèle Alliot-Marie – 2010
- Mayor of Nantes – Johanna Rolland– 2014
- Minister of Education – Najat Vallaud-Belkacem – 2014
- Mayor of Marseille – Michèle Rubirola– 2020

== Georgia ==
=== Kingdom ===
- Regent – Mariam of Vaspurakan – 1027
- Monarch – Tamar – 1178–1210

=== Georgian Soviet Socialist Republic ===
- Minister of Trade – Zinaida Arsen'evna Kvachadze – 1957
- Minister of Education – Tamar Lashkarashvili – 1960
- Deputy Premier – Victoria M. Siradze – 1962
- Vice-President – Tamar Lashkarashvili – 1979

=== Republic ===
- Speaker of the Georgian Parliament – Nino Burjanadze – 2003 – 2004 and 2007
- President (acting) – Nino Burjanadze – 2003
- Minister for Foreign Affairs – Salomé Zurabishvili – 2004
- Minister of Economic Development – Ekaterine Sharashidze – 2008
- Minister of Defense – Tina Khidasheli – 1 May 2015

==== Abkhazia ====
- Minister of Justice – Liudmila Khojashvili – 2005

== Germany ==
=== Holy Roman Empire ===
- Regent – Adelaide of Italy and Theophanu (co-regents) – 983

=== Weimar Republic ===
- Weimar National Assembly – 36 women, among them being Marie Baum, Marie Juchacz, Louise Schroeder – 1919

=== Allied Occupation ===
- Mayor of Berlin – Louise Schroeder – 1947

=== Democratic Republic ===
- Member of the Presidium of the Volkskammer – Friedel Malter – 1948
- Minister of Justice – Hilde Benjamin – 1953
- President of the Volkskammer and Acting Head of state – Sabine Bergmann-Pohl – 1990

=== Federal Republic (West) ===
- State secretary of Youth and Family Affairs – Gabriele Wülker – 1957
- Minister of Health – Elisabeth Schwarzhaupt – 1961
- President of the Bundestag – Annemarie Renger – 1972

=== Federal Republic (United) ===
- Minister of Justice – Sabine Leutheusser-Schnarrenberger – 1992
- Minister-President of any German state – Heide Simonis (of Schleswig-Holstein) – 1993
- European Commissioner for Regional Policy – Monika Wulf-Mathies – 1994
- Mayor of Frankfurt – Petra Roth – 1995
- Chancellor – Angela Merkel – 2005
- Minister of Defence – Ursula von der Leyen – 2013
- Minister of Foreign Affairs – Annalena Baerbock – 2021

== Greece ==
=== Kingdom ===
- Regent – Amalia of Oldenburg – 1850
- Member of Parliament – Eleni Skoura – 1953
- Mayor (Corfu)– Maria Desylla-Kapodistria – 1953
- Government minister and Minister for Social Welfare – Lina Tsaldari – 1956

=== Republic ===
==== National level ====
- Minister for Culture – Melina Mercouri – 1981
- European Commissioner for Employment and Social Affairs – Anna Diamantopoulou – 1999
- Mayor of Athens – Dora Bakoyannis – 2003
- President of Parliament – Anna Psarouda-Benaki – 2004
- Prime Minister (acting, not elected) – Vassiliki Thanou-Christophilou – 2015
- President – Katerina Sakellaropoulou – 2020

==== Individual ministries ====
- Minister of Justice – Anna Benaki-Psarouda – 1992
- Minister of Education and Religious Affairs – Marietta Giannakou-Koutsikou – 1993
- Minister for Environment – Vassiliki "Vaso" Papandreou – 1999
- Minister for Foreign Affairs – Dora Bakoyannis – 2006
- Minister for Tourism – Fani Palli-Petralia – 2006

== Hungary ==
=== Kingdom ===
- Regent – Helena of Serbia, Queen of Hungary – 1141
- Monarch – Mary of Hungary – 1382
- Monarch – Maria Theresa - 1740
- Member of Parliament – Margit Slachta – 1920

=== People's Republic ===
- Minister of Health – Anna Ratkó – 1950
- Minister of Light Industry - Józefné Nagy/ Nagy Jolán Szanka - 1955
- Minister of Education – Valéria Benke – 1958
- Speaker of the National Assembly – Erzsébet Metzker Vass – 1963
- Deputy Premier Minister – Csehák Judit – 1984
- Minister of Social Affairs and Health – Csehák Judit – 1987

=== Republic ===
- Minister for Justice – Ibolya Dávid – 1998
- Minister for Interior – Mónika Lamperth – 2002
- Minister for Equality – Katalin Lévai – 2004
- Foreign Minister – Kinga Göncz – 2006
- Health Minister – Ágnes Horváth – 2007
- Minister of National Development – Zsuzsanna Németh – 2011
- President – Katalin Novák – 2022

== Iceland ==
=== Kingdom ===
- Member of a City Council – Bríet Bjarnhéðinsdóttir – 1908
- Member of Parliament – Ingibjörg H. Bjarnason – 1922

=== Republic ===
- Mayor of Reykjavík – Auður Auðuns – 1960
- Speaker of Parliament (lower house) – Ragnhildur Helgadóttir – 1961
- Minister of Justice and Ecclesiastical Affairs – Auður Auðuns – 1970
- President – Vigdís Finnbogadóttir – 1980
- Speaker of Parliament (upper house) – Salome Þorkelsdóttir – 1983
- Minister of Education, Science and Culture – Ragnhildur Helgadóttir – 1983
- Minister of Health and Social Security – Ragnhildur Helgadóttir – 1985
- Speaker of Parliament (bicameral united house) – Salome Þorkelsdóttir – 1991
- Speaker of Parliament (unicameral) – Salome Þorkelsdóttir – 1991
- Minister for the Environment – Siv Friðleifsdóttir – 1999
- Minister of Industry – Valgerður Sverrisdóttir – 1999
- Minister for Foreign Affairs – Valgerður Sverrisdóttir – 2006
- Prime Minister – Jóhanna Sigurðardóttir – 2009
- Minister of Finance – Oddný Guðbjörg Harðardóttir – 2011

== Ireland ==
=== Kingdom of Ireland ===
- Queen regnant – Mary I – 1553

=== United Kingdom of Great Britain and Ireland ===
- Member of parliament – Constance Markievicz – 1918

=== Irish Republic ===
- Teachta Dála – Constance Markievicz – 1919
- Minister for Labour – Constance Markievicz – 1919

=== Free State ===
- Senator (Free State Senate) – Eileen Costello, Alice Stopford Green, Ellen Cuffe and Jennie Wyse Power – 1922
- Leader of a political party – Margaret Buckley – 1937

=== Ireland (Republic of Ireland) ===
- Senator (Senate of the Republic) – Margaret Mary Pearse, Linda Kearns MacWhinney, Helena Concannon and Margaret L. Kennedy – 1938
- Lord Mayor of Dublin – Kathleen Clarke – 1939
- Lord Mayor of Cork – Jane Dowdall – 1959
- Department of state Secretary-General – Thekla Beere – 1959
- Mayor of Limerick – Frances Condell – 1963
- Council of State Member – Honor Crowley – 1964
- Mayor of Galway – Mary Byrne – 1975
- Minister of State – Máire Geoghegan-Quinn – 1977
- Member of the European Parliament – Eileen Desmond and Síle de Valera – 1979
- Minister for the Gaeltacht – Máire Geoghegan-Quinn – 1979
- Leader of the Seanad – Gemma Hussey – 1981
- Minister for Health and Social Welfare – Eileen Desmond – 1981
- Minister for Education – Gemma Hussey – 1982
- Cathaoirleach of Seanad Éireann – Tras Honan – 1982
- President – Mary Robinson – 1990
- Minister for Tourism, Transport and Communications – Máire Geoghegan-Quinn – 1992
- Leader of a political party in Dáil Éireann – Mary Harney – 1993
- Minister for Justice – Máire Geoghegan-Quinn – 1993
- Tánaiste (Deputy Prime Minister) – Mary Harney – 1997
- Minister for Enterprise, Trade and Employment – Mary Harney – 1997
- Minister for Arts, Heritage, Gaeltacht and the Islands – Síle de Valera – 1997
- Minister for Agriculture and Food – Mary Coughlan – 2004
- Government Chief Whip – Mary Hanafin – 2002
- European Commissioner – Máire Geoghegan-Quinn – 2009
- Attorney General – Máire Whelan – 2011
- Minister for Children and Youth Affairs – Frances Fitzgerald – 2011
- Leader of the Opposition – Mary Lou McDonald – 2020
- Leas-Cheann Comhairle – Catherine Connolly – 2020
- Minister for Rural and Community Development – Heather Humphreys – 2020
- Minister for Foreign Affairs and Trade – Helen McEntee – 2025
- Minister for Defence – Helen McEntee – 2025

== Italy ==
- Undersecretary of Industry and Trade – Angela Maria Guidi Cingolani – 1951
- Minister of Labour and Social Security – Tina Anselmi – 1976
- Minister for Health – Tina Anselmi – 1978 (First female governmental minister)
- President of the Chamber of Deputies – Nilde Iotti – 1979
- President of Abruzzo – Anna Nenna D'Antonio – 1981 (First female president of a region)
- Minister of Education – Franca Falcucci – 1982
- Senator for Life – Camilla Ravera – 1982
- Minister of Tourism – Margherita Boniver – 1992
- President of Lombardia – Fiorella Ghilardotti – 1992
- Minister for Agriculture and Forests – Adriana Poli Bortone – 1994
- European Commissioner for Health and Consumer Protection – Emma Bonino – 1995
- Minister of Foreign Affairs – Susanna Agnelli – 1995
- Minister without Portfolio – Livia Turco – 1996
- Minister for Equal Opportunities – Anna Finocchiaro – 1996
- Minister of Cultural Activities and Sport – Giovanna Melandri – 1998
- Minister of Interior – Rosa Russo Iervolino – 1998
- President of Trentino-Alto Adige – Margherita Cogo – 1999
- President of Umbria – Maria Rita Lorenzetti – 2000
- Mayor of Naples – Rosa Russo Iervolino – 2001
- President of Piedmont – Mercedes Bresso – 2006
- Minister of European Politics and International Trade – Emma Bonino – 2006
- Mayor of Milan – Letizia Moratti – 2006
- Minister of the Environment – Stefania Prestigiacomo – 2008
- President of Democratic Party (Italy) – Rosy Bindi – 2009
- President of Lazio – Renata Polverini – 2010
- Minister of Justice – Paola Severino – 2011
- President of Friuli-Venezia Giulia – Alessandra Guerra – 1994
- Minister of Integration – Cécile Kyenge – 2013
- Minister of Defence – Roberta Pinotti – 2014
- Minister of Economic Development – Federica Guidi – 2014
- Minister of Constitutional Reforms and Parliamentary Relations – Maria Elena Boschi – 2014
- Mayor of Rome – Virginia Raggi – 2016
- President of the Senate – Maria Elisabetta Alberti Casellati – 2018
- Prime Minister – Giorgia Meloni – 2022
- President of Sardinia – Alessandra Todde – 2024

== Latvia ==
=== First Republic ===
- Member of Parliament – Berta Pīpiņa – 1931
- Deputy Minister of Education – Valērija Seile – 1921

=== Latvian Soviet Socialist Republic ===
- Government Minister (People's Comissar of State Control) – Olga Martynovna Auguste – 1941
- Minister of Justice – Emīlija Veinberga – 1951
- Chairman of the Supreme Soviet – Valentina S. Klibike – 1975

=== Second Republic ===
- President – Vaira Vīķe-Freiberga – 1999
- Member of the Saeima – Berta Pipina – 1931
- Speaker of the Saeima – Ilga Kreituse – 1995
- Foreign Minister – Sandra Kalniete – 2002
- European Commissioner for Agriculture and Fisheries – Sandra Kalniete – 2004
- Defence Minister – Linda Mūrniece – 2006
- Prime Minister – Laimdota Straujuma – 2014

== Liechtenstein ==
- Deputy Government Councillor for Social Affairs – Maria Foser – 1984
- Minister of Transport and Building – Cornelia Gassner – 1993
- Minister of Foreign Affairs – Andrea Willi – 1993

== Lithuania ==
=== Republic ===
- Members of Parliament – Felicija Bortkevičienė and Gabrielė Petkevičaitė-Bitė – 1920
- Speaker of the constituent session of the Constituent Assembly of Lithuania – Gabrielė Petkevičaitė-Bitė – 15 May 1920

=== Lithuanian Soviet Socialist Republic ===
- Vice-President – Leokadija Diržinskaitė-Piliušenko – 1959
- Minister of Foreign Affairs – Leokadija Diržinskaitė-Piliušenko – 1961
- Head of the Central Committee Department of Trade and Public Service – Jaina B. Tatsiavichenė – 1971
- Prime Minister – Kazimira Prunskienė – 1990

=== Republic of Lithuania ===
- European Commissioner for Financial Programming and the Budget – Dalia Grybauskaitė – 2004
- President – Dalia Grybauskaitė – 2009
- Foreign minister (acting) – Rasa Juknevičienė – 2010

== Luxembourg ==
=== County, Duchy and Grand Duchy ===
- Monarch – Ermesinde, Countess of Luxembourg – 1197

=== Grand Duchy ===
- Grand Duchess – Marie-Adélaïde – 1912
- Member of Parliament – Marguerite Thomas-Clement – 1919
- Minister of Family, Youth, Social Solidarity, Health, Culture and Religious Affairs – Madeleine Frieden-Kinnen – 1969
- Mayor of Luxembourg City – Colette Flesch– 1970
- Deputy Prime Minister – Colette Flesch – 1980
- President of the Council of the European Union – Colette Flesch – 1980
- Minister of Justice – Colette Flesch – 1980
- Minister for Foreign Affairs – Colette Flesch – 1980
- President of the Chamber of Deputies – Erna Hennicot-Schoepges – 1989
- European Commissioner for Justice, Consumers and Gender Equality – Martine Reicherts – 2009

== Malta ==
=== Colony ===
- Member of Parliament – Agatha Barbara – 1947
- Minister – Agatha Barbara – 1955

=== Republic ===
- President – Agatha Barbara – 1982
- Mayor (Għasri, Gozo) – Rita Cutajar – 1993
- Speaker of the House of Representatives – Myriam Spiteri Debono – 1996

== Moldova ==
=== Moldavian Soviet Socialist Republic ===
- Deputy Premier – Agrippina Krachun – 1951
- Deputy Premier – Agrippina Krachun – 1953
- Minister of Light Industry – Galina Jitniuc – 1965

=== Republic of Moldova ===
- Minister of Labour and Social Protection – Eugenia Mihailov – 1991
- Minister of Finance – Claudia Melnic – 1992
- Minister of Industry and Trade – Alexandra Can – 1999
- Deputy Prime Minister – Lidia Guțu – 1999
- Minister of Justice – Valeria Șterbeț – 1999
- President of the Parliament – Eugenia Ostapciuc – 2001
- Vice President of the Parliament – Maria Postoico – 2005
- First Deputy Prime Minister – Zinaida Greceanîi – 2005
- Minister of Ecology and Natural Resources – Violeta Ivanov – 2008
- Minister of Education and Youth – Larisa Șavga – 2008
- Prime Minister – Zinaida Greceanîi – 2008
- Minister of Health – Larisa Catrinici – 2008
- Deputy Prime Minister for Social Affairs – Tatiana Potîng – 2013
- Minister of Foreign Affairs and European Integration – Natalia Gherman – 2013
- Minister of Culture – Monica Babuc – 2013
- Governor of Gagauzia – Irina Vlah – 2015
- Minister of Youth and Sport – Loretta Handrabura – 2015
- Deputy Prime Minister for Reintegration – Cristina Lesnic – 2018
- Minister of Agriculture, Regional Development and Environment – Georgeta Mincu – 2019
- President of the Constitutional Court – Domnica Manole – 2020
- President – Maia Sandu – 2020
- Minister of Internal Affairs – Ana Revenco – 2021
- Minister of Infrastructure and Regional Development – Lilia Dabija – 2023
- Deputy Prime Minister for European Integration – Cristina Gherasimov – 2024
- Minister of Economic Development and Digitalization – Doina Nistor – 2025

=== Transnistria ===
unrecognized, secessionist state

- Minister of Foreign Affairs – Nina Shtanski – 2012
- Prime Minister – Tatiana Turanskaya – 2013
- Chairwoman of the Supreme Council – Tatyana Zalevskaya – 2025

== Monaco ==
- Communal Council – Roxane Noat-Notari – 1955
- National Council – Roxane Noat-Notari – 1963
- Mayor of Monaco – Anne-Marie Campora – 1991
- Government Councillor of Finance and Economy – Sophie Thevenoux – 2009
- Government Councillor of Department of Infrastructure, Environment and Urbanization – Marie-Pierre Gramaglia – 2011

== Montenegro ==
=== Serbia and Montenegro ===
- Speaker of Parliament – Vesna Perović – 2001
- Supreme State Attorney – Vesna Medenica – 2004
- Mayor of City/President of Municipality (first elected) – Marija-Maja Ćatović – 2005

=== Republic of Montenegro ===
- Deputy Prime Minister – Gordana Đurović – 2006

== Netherlands ==
=== Spanish Netherlands ===
- Governor – Margaret of Austria- 1507–1530

=== Dutch Republic ===
- Diplomat – Bartholda van Swieten – 1615
- Regent (acting stadtholder) – Anne, Princess Royal and Princess of Orange – 1751

=== Kingdom ===
- Monarch – Queen Wilhelmina – 1890
- Member of the House of Representatives of the States-General – Suze Groeneweg – 1917
- Member of the Senate of the States-General – Carry Pothuis-Smit – 1920
- Alderman – Eiske ten Bos-Harkema – 1924
- Mayor – Truus Smulders-Beliën – 1946
- Minister of Social Work – Marga Klompé – 1956
- Minister of Education, Arts and Sciences – Marga Klompé – 1961
- Party chair – Haya van Someren – 1969
- Minister of Health and Hygiene – Irene Vorrink – 1973
- Parliamentary leader in the Senate – Haya van Someren – 1976
- Party leader – Ria Beckers – 1977
- Parliamentary leader in the House of Representatives – Ria Beckers – 1977
- Minister of Transport, Public Works and Water Management – Neelie Kroes – 1982
- Minister for Development Cooperation – Eegje Schoo – 1982
- Minister of the Interior – Ien Dales – 1989
- Minister of Justice – Winnie Sorgdrager – 1994
- Minister of Housing, Spatial Planning and the Environment – Margreeth de Boer – 1994
- Deputy Prime Ministers – Annemarie Jorritsma and Els Borst – 1998
- Minister of Economic Affairs – Annemarie Jorritsma – 1998
- Speaker of the House of Representatives – Jeltje van Nieuwenhoven – 1998
- Minister of Education, Culture and Science – Maria van der Hoeven – 2002
- Minister for Integration and Immigration – Rita Verdonk – 2003
- President of the Senate – Yvonne Timmerman-Buck – 2003
- European Commissioner – Neelie Kroes – 2004
- Minister of Agriculture, Nature and Food Quality – Gerda Verburg – 2007
- Minister of Infrastructure and the Environment – Melanie Schultz van Haegen – 2010
- Minister of Defence – Jeanine Hennis-Plasschaert – 2012
- Minister of Foreign Affairs – Sigrid Kaag – 2018
- Minister of Social Affairs – Karien van Gennip – 2022
- Minister of Finance – Sigrid Kaag – 2022

== North Macedonia ==
- Minister of Development – Sofija Todorova – 1992
- Minister without portfolio – Gordana Siljanovska – 1992
- Interior minister – Dosta Dimovska – 1999
- Foreign minister – Ilinka Mitreva – 2001
- Minister of justice– Meri Mladenovska Gjorgjievska – 2002
- Prime Minister (acting) – Radmila Šekerinska – 2004
- President of Social Democratic Union of Macedonia – Radmila Šekerinska – 2006
- Minister of Culture – Elizabeta Kanceska Milevska – 2008
- President – Gordana Siljanovska-Davkova – 2024

== Norway ==
- Monarch – Margaret I – 1387
- Deputy member of the Norwegian Parliament – Anna Rogstad – 1911
- Member of the Norwegian Parliament – Karen Platou – 1921
- Mayor – Aasa Helgesen (in Utsira Municipality) – 1926
- Minister of Social Affairs – Kirsten Hansteen – 1945
- Minister of Justice – Elisabeth Schweigaard Selmer – 1965
- State Secretary – Elsa Rastad Bråten – 1971
- President of the Lagting – Torild Skard – 1973
- Minister of the Environment – Gro Harlem Brundtland – 1974
- County Governor – Ebba Lodden (in Aust-Agder) – 1974
- Prime Minister – Gro Harlem Brundtland – 1981
- Chief of Police (Halden) – Ann-Kristin Olsen
- President of the Odelsting – Åshild Hauan – 1985
- Mayor of Oslo – Ann-Marit Sæbønes – 1992
- President of the Storting – Kirsti Kolle Grøndahl – 1993
- Minister of Defence – Eldbjørg Løwer – 2001
- Minister of Finance – Kristin Halvorsen – 2005
- Minister of Foreign Affairs – Ine Marie Eriksen Søreide – 2017

Other political positions

- Party leader – Eva Kolstad (Liberal) – 1974

=== Svalbard ===
- Governor of Svalbard – Ann-Kristin Olsen – 1995

== Poland ==
=== Kingdom (1385–1569) ===
- Monarch – Jadwiga of Poland – 1384

=== Second Republic ===
- First members of Sejm (lower house of the parliament) – Gabriela Balicka, Jadwiga Dziubińska, Irena Kosmowska, Maria Moczydłowska, Zofia Moraczewska, Anna Piasecka, Zofia Sokolnicka, Franciszka Wilczkowiakowa – 1919
- Senator – Zofia Daszyńska-Golińska – 1928

=== People's Republic ===
- Vice-Chairperson of the Provisoric Government – Wanda Wasilewska – 1944
- Minister of Justice – Zofia Wasilkowska – 1956
- Minister of Administration, Land Economy and Environment – Maria Milczarek – 1976
- Minister of Labor, Welfare and Social Policy – Maria Milczarek – 1979
- Minister of Education and Behaviour – Joanna Michałowska-Gumowska – 1985
- Minister of Health and Welfare – Izabela Płaneta-Małecka – 1988

=== Republic ===
- Minister of Culture and Art – Izabella Cywińska – 1989
- Minister of Industry and Commerce – Henryka Bochniarz – 1991
- Prime Minister – Hanna Suchocka – 1992
- Chairman of the National Bank of Poland – Hanna Gronkiewicz-Waltz – 1992
- Minister of Construction and Spatial Management – Barbara Blida – 1993
- Marshal of the Senate – Alicja Grześkowiak – 1997
- Minister of Finance – Halina Wasilewska-Trenkner – 2001
- Minister of State Treasury – Aldona Kamela-Sowińska – 2001
- Minister of European Affairs – Danuta Hübner – 2003
- Deputy Prime Minister – Izabela Jaruga-Nowacka – 2004
- Minister of Social Policy – Izabela Jaruga-Nowacka – 2004
- European Commissioner for Regional Policy – Danuta Hübner – 2004
- Minister of Regional Development – Grażyna Gęsicka – 2005
- Minister of Foreign Affairs – Anna Fotyga – 2006
- President of Warsaw – Hanna Gronkiewicz-Waltz – 2006
- Minister of Sport and Tourism – Elżbieta Jakubiak – 2007
- Minister of Science and Higher Education – Barbara Kudrycka – 2007
- Marshal of the Sejm – Ewa Kopacz – 2011

== Portugal ==
=== County ===
- Countess – Theresa, Countess of Portugal – 1112

=== Kingdom ===
- Monarch (disputed) – Beatrice of Portugal – 1383
- Monarch – Maria I – 1777

=== Republic ===
- Undersecretary of the Ministry of Health and Assistance – Maria Teresa Cárcomo Lobo – 1970
- Minister of Social Affairs – Maria de Lurdes Pintasilgo – 1974
- Prime Minister – Maria de Lurdes Pintasilgo – 1979
- Minister of Health – Leonor Beleza – 1985
- Judge of the Constitutional Court – Maria da Assunção Esteves – 1989
- Minister of Education – Manuela Ferreira Leite – 1993
- Minister of Environment – Teresa Patrício de Gouveia – 1993
- Minister for Qualification and Employment – Maria João Rodrigues – 1995
- Minister of Planning – Elisa Ferreira – 1999
- Minister of State and Minister of Finance – Manuela Ferreira Leite – 2002
- Minister of Justice – Celeste Cardona – 2002
- Minister of Science and Higher Education – Graça Carvalho – 2003
- Minister of Foreign Affairs – Teresa Patrício de Gouveia – 2003
- Minister of Culture – Maria João Bustorff – 2004
- Minister of Environment and Territorial Organization – Dulce Pássaro – 2009
- Leader of the Opposition – Manuela Ferreira Leite – 2008
- President of the Assembly of the Republic – Maria da Assunção Esteves – 2011
- Minister of Agriculture, Sea, Environment and Territorial Organization – Maria de Assunção Oliveira Cristas Machado da Graças – 2011
- Vice-President of the Constitutional Court – Maria Lúcia Amaral – 2012
- Attorney General of the Republic – Joana Marques Vidal – 2012
- President of the Legislative Assembly of the Azores – Ana Luís – 2012
- Minister of Internal Administration – Anabela Rodrigues – 2014
- Minister of the Presidency and Administrative Modernization – Maria Manuel Leitão Marques – 2015
- Ombudswoman – Maria Lúcia Amaral – 2017

== Romania ==
=== Kingdom ===
- Mayor (of Bogdănești, Vaslui) – Luiza Zavloschi – 1930

=== People's Republic ===
- Minister of Health – Florica Bagdasar – 1946
- Minister of Foreign Affairs – Ana Pauker – 1947
- Minister of Social Affairs – Stella Ernestu – 1952
- Minister of Culture and Art – Constanța Crăciun – 1953
- Vice-President of the State Council – Constanța Crăciun – 1966
- Minister of Industry – Ana Mureson – 1966
- Member of the Politburo – Lina Ciobanu – 1977
- Minister of Education – Aneta Spornic – 1979
- First Deputy Prime Minister – Elena Ceauşescu – 1980
- Vice-President of the Council of State – Maria Ciocan – 1980
- Minister of the Food Industry – Paula Prioteasa – 1986
- Minister of Labour – Alexandrina Gainusa – 1986
- Minister of Justice – Maria Bobu – 1987

=== Republic ===
- Member of the Council of the National Salvation Front and Joint Collective Head of State – Christina Cioutu – 1989
- Prefect (of Bucharest) – Mioara Mantale – 2004
- President of the Chamber of Deputies – Roberta Anastase – 2008
- Minister of Tourism – Elena Udrea – 2008
- European Commissioner for Regional Policy – Corina Crețu – 2014
- Prime Minister – Viorica Dăncilă – 2018
- President of the Senate – Anca Dragu – 2020

== Russia ==
=== Imperial ===
- Regent – Elena Glinskaya – 1533
- Monarch – Catherine I of Russia – 1725

=== Interim Republic ===
- Vice Minister of State Welfare and Vice Minister of Education – Sofia Panina – 1917

=== Union of Soviet Socialist Republics ===
- Commissar (Minister) – Alexandra Kollontai – 1917 (First female minister in the world)
- Commissioner of Foreign Affairs – Angelika Balabanoff – 1918
- People's Commissar of the Navy – Larisa Mikhailovna Reisner – 1918
- Candidate Member of the Politburo – Elena Stasova – 1919
- Member of the Central Committee of the Communist Party of the Soviet Union – Nadezhda Krupskaya – 1924
- Deputy minister (Commissar) of Education – Nadezhda Krupskaya – 1929
- People's Commissar of Finance – Varvara Nikolaevna Yakovleva – 1929
- Member of the Supreme Soviet – Nadezhda Krupskaya – 1931
- Member of Presidium of the Supreme Soviet – Nadezhda Krupskaya and Klavdiya Nikolayeva – 1937
- First Secretary of the Communist Party – Domina Komarova – 1948
- Minister of Health – Maria Kovrigina – 1953
- Full Member of the Politburo – Ekaterina Furtseva – 1957
- Minister of Culture – Ekaterina Furtseva – 1960
- Deputy Minister of Light Industry – Eudokiia F. Karpova – 1964
- Deputy Premier Minister and Head of the Central Committee Department of Light and Local Industry – Eudokiia F. Karpova – 1966
- Vice-chairman of the Council of ministres of the RSFSR – Lidia Lykova – 1967
- Vice-Chairperson of the Supreme Soviet – Tatyana G. Ivanova – 1985

=== Federation ===
- Member of the Consultative Council of the President – Tatyana Zaslavskaya – 1992
- Governor – Valentina Matviyenko – 2003
- Mayor of Saint Petersburg – Valentina Matviyenko – 2003
- Chairwoman of the Federation Council of Russia – Valentina Matviyenko – 2011

== San Marino ==
- Minister of the Interior and of Justice – Clara Boscaglia – 1978
- Co-Captain Regent – Maria Lea Pedini-Angelini – 1981
- Foreign minister – Antonella Mularoni – 2008

== Serbia ==
=== Imperial ===
- Regent – Helena of Bulgaria – 1355–1357

=== Despotate ===
- Monarch – Jelena (Marija) – 1458 – 1459

=== Principality ===
- Education and Art adviser – Katarina Ivanović – 1870
- Member of the Great People's Assembly of Serbs, Bunjevci and other Slavs in Banat, Bačka and Baranja – Milica Tomić, Mara Đorđević Malagurski, Anastasija Manojlović, Marija Jovanović, Olga Stanković, Katica Rajčić and Manda Sudarević – 1918.

=== Federal People's Republic of Yugoslavia ===
- Minister of Education – Mitra Mitrović – 1945–1948
- Minister of Labour – Spasenija Cana Babović – 1946–1948
- Minister of Health – Spasenija Cana Babović – 1948–1953
- Deputy Prime Minister – Spasenija Cana Babović – 1953–1963

=== Socialist Federal Republic of Yugoslavia ===
- President of the Federal Chamber – Stana Tomasević-Arnesen – 1979
- President of the Federal Executive Council (Prime Minister) – Milka Planinc – 1982

=== Federal Republic of Yugoslavia ===
- Mayor of Belgrade – Slobodanka Gruden – 1992–1994
- Minister of Human Rights and Minority Rights – Margit Savović – 1993–1994
- Leader of Party Yugoslav (Left) – Mirjana Marković – 1994–2001
- Deputy Prime Minister – Maja Gojković – 1998–2000
- Minister of Self-government – Gordana Pop Lazić – 1998–2000
- Minister of Information – Radmila Milentijević – 1998–2000
- Minister of Economic transformation – Jorgovanka Tabaković – 1998–2000
- Minister of Labour and Employment – Gordana Matković – 2001–2004
- President of Party of successful women – Margit Savović – 2001–2004
- Minister of Environment – Anđelka Mihajlov – 2001–2002
- President of the Supreme Court – Leposava Karamarković – 2001–2002
- Minister of Traffic and Telecommunication – Marija Rašeta Vukosavljević – 2001–2004
- Speaker of the National Assembly of Serbia – Nataša Mićić – 2001– 2004
- President (acting) – Nataša Mićić – 2002–2003
- Minister of Energy and Mining – Kori Udovički – 2001–2003

=== State Union of Serbia and Montenegro ===
- Governor of a National Bank of Serbia – Kori Udovički – 2003–2004
- Minister of Education – Ljiljana Čolić – 2004
- Mayor of Novi Sad – Maja Gojković – 2004–2008

=== Republic of Serbia ===
- Deputy Prime Minister – Ivana Dulić-Marković – 2006
- Minister of Science – Ana Pešikan – 2007–2008
- Minister of Telecommunication and Informatics – Aleksandra Smiljanić – 2007–2008
- President of the Constitutional Court of Serbia – Bosa Nenadić – 2007–2010
- Deputy Prime Minister and Minister of Economy – Verica Kalanović – 2011–2012
- Minister of Finance – Diana Dragutinović – 2008–2011
- Minister of Justice – Snežana Malović – 2008–2012
- Mayor of Pančevo – Vesna Martinović – 2008–2012
- President of the Supreme Court of Cassation – Nata Mesarović – 2010–2013
- State Attorney – Zagorka Dolovac – 2012
- President (acting) – Slavica Đukić Dejanović – 2012
- President of Christian Democratic Party of Serbia – Olgica Batić – 2011
- President of party Together for Vojvodina – Olena Papuga – 2012
- Minister of Energy – Zorana Mihajlović – 2012–2014
- Deputy Prime Minister – Suzana Grubješić – 2012–2013
- Mayor of Smederevo – Jasna Avramović – 2012
- Governor of a National Bank of Serbia – Jorgovanka Tabaković – 2012
- Speaker of the National Assembly of Serbia – Maja Gojković – 2014
- Deputy Prime Minister and a Minister of Transportation, Construction and Infrastructure – Zorana Mihajlović – 2014
- Deputy Prime Minister and a Minister of State and Local Governments – Kori Udovički – 2014
- Minister of Agriculture and Environment – Snežana Bogosavljević Bošković – 2014
- Minister of European Integration – Jadranka Joksimović – 2014
- President of Democratic Party of Serbia – Sanda Rašković Ivić – 2014
- Mayor of Vršac – Dragana Mitrović – 2016
- Mayor of Sombor – Dušanka Golubović – 2016
- Prime Minister – Ana Brnabić – 2017
- Mayor of Kruševac – Jasmina Palurović – 2017
- Mayor of Niš – Dragana Sotirovski – 2020
- Mayor of Užice – Jelena Raković Radivojević – 2020
- Mayor of Sremska Mitrovica – Svetlana Milovanović – 2020

=== Kosovo ===
partially recognized secessionist state under nominal international administration

- Foreign minister (acting) – Vlora Çitaku – 2010
- President – Atifete Jahjaga – 2011

== Slovakia ==
- Minister of Labour, Social Affairs and Family – Oľga Keltošová – 1993 (also Minister of Labour, Social Affairs and Family of Slovakia within Czechoslovakia since 1992)
- Minister of Justice – Katarína Tóthová – 1993 (also Minister of Justice of Slovakia within Czechoslovakia since 1992)
- Minister of Health – Irena Belohorská – 1993
- Deputy Prime Minister – Brigita Schmögnerová – 1994
- Minister of Education – Eva Slavkovská – 1994
- Minister of Foreign Affairs – Zdenka Kramplová – 1997
- Minister of Privatization – Mária Machová – 1998
- Minister of Finance – Brigita Schmögnerová – 1998
- Deputy Speaker of the National Council of the Slovak Republic – Zuzana Martináková – 2002
- Minister of Agriculture – Zdenka Kramplová – 2007
- Chief Justice of the Constitutional Court of Slovakia – Ivetta Macejková – 2007
- Prime Minister – Iveta Radičová – 2010
- President – Zuzana Čaputová – 2019

Please note: Independent Slovak Republic was established on January 1, 1993. The first female politicians of Slovak Republic as a part of Czech and Slovak Federative Republic are not included above.

=== List of Slovak female holders of political offices before independence ===
==== Czechoslovakia ====
- Member of Parliament – Irena Kaňová – 1919
- Commissioner for Health and Social Welfare (equivalent to minister) – Emília Janečková-Muríňová – 1950
- Minister of Health and Social Affairs – Eva Tökölyová – 1986
- Minister of State Audit – Mária Kolaříková – 1989

==== Czech and Slovak Federative Republic ====
- Minister of Labour, Social Affairs and Family – Helena Woleková – 1991
- Minister of Trade and Tourism – Jana Kotová – 1992
- Minister of Justice – Katarína Tóthová – 1992
- Minister of Labour, Social Affairs and Family – Oľga Keltošová – 1992

== Slovenia ==
- Ministry of Health – Katja Boh – 1990
- Minister of Labour, Family, Social Affairs and Equal Opportunities – Jožica Puhar – 1990
- Minister of Veterans and War Invalides – Ana Osterman – 1990
- Ministry of Justice – Metka Zupančič – 1994
- Ministry of Economy Development and Technologies – Tea Petrin – 2000
- Ministry of Culture – Andreja Rihter – 2000
- Ministry of Education, Science and Sport – Lucija Čok – 2000
- Ministry without Portfolio (Regional Development) – Zdenka Kovač – 2002
- Ministry of Agriculture and Forestry – Zdenka Kovač – 2004
- Minister of the Interior – Katarina Kresal – 2008
- Ministry of Public Administration – Irma Pavlinič Krebs – 2008
- Minister of Defence – Ljubica Jelušič – 2008
- Prime Minister – Alenka Bratušek – 2013
- Ministry of Environment and Spatial Planning – Irena Majcen – 2014
- European Commissioner for Transport – Violeta Bulc – 2014
- President – Nataša Pirc Musar – 2022

== Spain ==
=== Kingdom ===
This list includes office holders after the unification of Spain in the 16th-century:

- Monarch – Joanna I – 1504–1555
- Regent – Isabella of Portugal – 1535–1539
- First Female Mayor – Matilde Pérez Mollá – 1924
- First thirteen Members of National Assembly – Blanca de los Ríos de Lampérez, Isidra Quesada y Gutiérrez de los Ríos, Micaela Díaz y Rabaneda, María de Maeztu, María de Echarri y Martínez, María López de Sagredo, Concepción Loring y Heredia, Carmen Cuesta del Muro, Teresa Luzzatti Quiñones, Josefina Oloriz Arcelus, María López Moleón, María Natividad Domínguez de Roger y Trinidad Von Scholtzhermensdorff – 1927

=== Second Republic ===
- Members of Parliament – Margarita Nelken, Clara Campoamor and Victoria Kent – 1931
- First democratic mayor – María Domínguez Remón – 1932
- Minister of Health – Federica Montseny – 1936

=== Francoist Spain ===
- Mayor of Bilbao – Pilar Careaga – 1969

=== Kingdom (restored) ===
- Mayor of Vigo – Enma González – 1978
- Minister of Culture – Soledad Becerril – 1981
- Mayor of Valencia – Clementina Ródenas – 1988
- President of the Region of Murcia – María Antonia Martínez – 1993
- Mayor of Seville – Soledad Becerril – 1995
- Mayor of Zaragoza – Luisa Fernanda Rudi – 1995
- Mayor of Málaga – Celia Villalobos – 1995
- President of the Parliament of Navarre – María Dolores Eguren – 1995
- Minister of Environment – Isabel Tocino – 1996
- Minister of Agriculture – Loyola de Palacio – 1996
- Minister of Justice – Margarita Mariscal de Gante – 1996
- President of Senate – Esperanza Aguirre – 1999
- Minister of Education – Esperanza Aguirre – 1999
- Mayor of Cordóba – Rosa Aguilar – 1999
- Mayor of Gijón – Paz Fernández – 1999
- Mayor of Pamplona – Yolanda Barcina – 1999
- European Commissioner for Transport and Energy – Loyola de Palacio – 1999
- Minister of Industry – Anna Birulés – 2000
- Foreign minister – Ana Palacio – 2002
- Minister of Public Administrations – Julia García-Valdecasas – 2003
- President of the Community of Madrid – Esperanza Aguirre – 2003
- Mayor of Las Palmas – Josefa Luzardo – 2003
- Mayoress of Palma de Mallorca – Catalina Cirer – 2003
- Minister of Public Works – Magdalena Álvarez – 2004
- Minister of Presidency – María Teresa Fernández de la Vega – 2004
- Minister of Housing – María Antonia Trujillo – 2004
- First Vice President of the Government – María Teresa Fernández de la Vega – 2004
- President of the Basque Parliament – Izaskun Bilbao – 2005
- Minister of Defense – Carme Chacón – 2008
- Minister of Science and Innovation – Cristina Garmendia – 2008
- Minister of Equality – Bibiana Aído – 2008
- Mayor of Alicante – Sonia Castedo – 2008
- Minister of Economy – Elena Salgado – 2009
- President of the Parliament of Catalonia – Nuria de Gispert – 2010
- Mayor of Madrid – Ana Botella – 2011
- President of Navarre – Yolanda Barcina – 2011
- Mayor of Barcelona – Ada Colau – 2015
- Mayor of Vitoria-Gasteiz – Maider Etxebarria – 2023
- Deputy General (president) of Gipuzkoa – Eider Mendoza – 2023
- Deputy General (president) of Biscay – Elixabete Etxanobe – 2023

==== Autonomous City ====
- Senator and Deputy (Melilla) – María del Carmen Dueñas

== Sweden ==
=== Kingdom ===
During the Kalmar Union (1397–1523), Sweden was in union with Denmark and Norway, but maintained its own administration. Sweden was in union with Norway during the United Kingdoms of Sweden and Norway (1814–1905), but each country had its own administration and laws, and thus should be listed separately.

- Regent: Ingeborg of Norway – 1319
- Monarch – Margaret I – 1389
- Governor (häradshövding) of Stranda Hundred – Sigrid Sture – 1577
- Member of a government committee – Sophie Adlersparre and Hilda Caselli – 1885
- Member of a Public Comity (Public School Board): Lilly Engström – 1889
- Member of the executive committee of a political party – Kata Dalström – 1900
- Chairperson of the Women's trades union – Anna Sterky – 1902
- Member of the City Council of Stockholm – Gertrud Månsson – 1910
- Member of a City Council – 37 women, among them Hanna Lindberg – 1910
- Member of the legislative assembly – Emilia Broomé – 1914
- Member of the Riksdag (lower house) – Elisabeth Tamm, Agda Östlund, Nelly Thüring and Bertha Wellin – 1921
- Member of the Riksdag (upper house) – Kerstin Hesselgren – 1921
- Minister without portfolio – Karin Kock-Lindberg – 1947
- Minister for Public Housekeeping – Karin Kock-Lindberg – 1948
- Minister of Family, Consumption, Aid and Immigration – Ulla Lindström – 1954
- Acting prime minister – Ulla Lindström – 1958
- Permanent Representative of Sweden to the United Nations – Agda Rössel – 1958
- Chairperson of City Council – Blenda Ljungberg – 1959
- Municipal commissioner – Ella Tengbom-Velander – 1967
- Supreme Court Justice – Ingrid Gärde Widemar – 1968
- County Governor – Camilla Odhnoff – 1974
- Minister for Foreign Affairs – Karin Söder – 1976
- Minister for Health and Social Affairs – Karin Söder – 1979
- Minister for Education – Lena Hjelm-Wallén – 1982
- Minister for Employment – Anna-Greta Leijon – 1982
- Leader of a political party represented in the Riksdag – Karin Söder – 1985
- Minister for Justice – Anna-Greta Leijon – 1987
- Minister for the Environment – Birgitta Dahl – 1987
- Speaker of the Riksdag – Ingegerd Troedsson – 1991
- Minister for Finance – Anne Wibble – 1991
- Minister for Culture – Birgit Friggebo – 1991
- Deputy Prime Minister – Mona Sahlin – 1994
- Minister for Agriculture – Margareta Winberg – 1994
- European Commissioner for Immigration, Justice, Home Affairs and Financial Control – Anita Gradin – 1995
- Minister for Defence – Leni Björklund – 2002
- Mayor of Stockholm – Annika Billström – 2002
- Prime Minister – Magdalena Andersson – 2021

== Switzerland ==
- Member of a citizens' council – Trudy Späth-Schweizer – 1958
- President of a Cantonal Parliament (of Geneva) – Emma Kammacher – 1965
- Mayor (of Geneva) – Lise Girardin – 1968
- Member of the Swiss Council of States – Lise Girardin – 1971
- Member of the Swiss National Council – Nelly Wicky, Lilian Uchtenhagen, Hanny Thalmann, Liselotte Spreng, Hanna Sahlfeld, Martha Ribi, Gabrielle Nanchen, Josi Meier, Hedi Lang, Tilo Frey, Elisabeth Blunschy – 1971
- President of the Swiss National Council – Elisabeth Blunschy – 1977
- Member of a Cantonal Executive (of Zurich) – Hedi Lang – 1983
- Member of the Swiss Federal Council – Elisabeth Kopp – 1984
- Justice minister – Elisabeth Kopp – 1984
- Mayor of Lausanne – Yvette Jaggi – 1990
- Vice-President of the Swiss Confederation – Elisabeth Kopp – 1989
- President of the Swiss Council of States – Josi Meier – 1991
- Landammann of Schwyz – Margrit Weber-Röllin – 1992
- Schultheiss of Lucerne – Brigitte Mürner-Gilli – 1992
- Landammann of Zug – Ruth Schwerzmann – 1993
- Landammann of Aargau – Stéphanie Mörikofer – 1997
- President of the Swiss Confederation – Ruth Dreifuss – 1999
- Landammann of Uri – Gabi Huber – 2002
- Foreign minister – Micheline Calmy-Rey – 2003
- Landammann of Nidwalden – Lisbeth Gabriel – 2005
- Economics minister – Doris Leuthard – 2006
- Landammann of Glarus – Marianne Dürst – 2008
- Member of the Conseil d'État of the canton of Valais – Esther Waeber Kalbermatten – 2009
- Mayor of Zurich – Corine Mauch – 2009
- Mayor of St. Gallen – Maria Pappa – 2021

== Turkey ==
=== Ottoman ===
- Regent – Kösem Sultan – 1623

=== Republic ===
- Mayor of Kılıçkaya, Artvin – Sadiye Hanım – 1930
- muhtar (village head) – Gülkız Ürbül – 1933
- Members of Parliament – Hatı Çırpan and 17 others – 1935
- Mayor (of Mersin) – Müfide İlhan – 1950
- First senator of the senate (upper house) – Mebrure Aksoley – 1964
- First female Turkish party leader for Workers Party of Turkey – Behice Boran – 1970
- Minister of Health – Türkân Akyol – 1971
- First Turkish party founded by a woman, National Women's Party of Turkey – Mübeccel Göktuna Törüner – 1972
- Minister of Culture – Nermin Neftçi – 1974
- First female Ambassador – Filiz Dinçmen – 1982
- Minister of Labor Relations and Social Security – Dr. İmren Aykut – 1987
- Provincial Governor (Muğla Province) – Lale Aytaman – 1991
- Minister of State – Güler İleri – 1991
- Prime Minister (elected) – Tansu Çiller – 1993
- President of the Council of State (Turkey), highest administrative court – Füruzan İkincioğulları – 1994
- Minister of Environment – Işılay Saygın – 1996
- Minister of Tourism – Işılay Saygın – 1996
- Minister of the Interior – Dr. Meral Akşener – 1996
- Deputy Premier and Foreign Minister – Tansu Çiller – 1996
- Minister of Justice – Aysel Çelikel – 2002
- Minister of National Education – Nimet Baş – 2009
- Minister of Family and Social Policies – Fatma Şahin – 2011
- Minister of European Union – Beril Dedeoğlu – 2015

== Ukraine ==
=== Soviet Socialist Republic ===
- Government minister and Minister of Interior – Evgenia Bosh – 1918
- Acting Prime Minister – Evgenia Bosh – 1918
- Minister of Education and Science – Alla Bondar – 1962
- Minister of Culture – Z. Rakhimbaeva – 1965
- Chairperson of the State-Committee of the Protection of Nature – Dina Protsenko – 1975
- Chairperson of the Presidium of the Supreme Soviet – Valentyna Shevchenko – 1984
- Deputy Premier Minister – Mariya A. Orlik – 1989

=== Republic ===
- Minister of Youth and Sports – Susanna Stanik – 1996
- Minister of Justice – Susanna Stanik – 1997
- Minister of Health – Raisa Bogatyrova – 1999
- Prime Minister – Yulia Tymoshenko – 2005
- Minister of Culture – Oksana Bilozir – 2005
- Minister of Labor and Social Policy – Lyudmyla Denisova – 2007
- Minister of Finance – Natalie Jaresko – 2014
- Minister of Education and Science – Liliya Hrynevych – 2016
- Minister of Communities and Territories Development – Aliona Babak – 2019
- Minister of Temporarily Occupied Territories, IDPs and Veterans – Oksana Koliada – 2019
- Minister of Economy – Yulia Svyrydenko – 2021

== United Kingdom ==
=== Great Britain ===
- Monarch – Queen Anne – 1701
- City Council (Poor Board) – Mary Clifford – 1875
- Member of a City Council – Margaret Ashton – 1908
- Mayor (of Aldeburgh) – Elizabeth Garrett Anderson – 1908

=== Great Britain and Ireland ===
- Member of Parliament (elected) – Constance Markievicz – 1918
- Member of Parliament (who took her seat) – Nancy Astor – 1919

==== United Kingdom of Great Britain and Northern Ireland ====
- Minister of Labour – Margaret Bondfield – 1929
- Minister for Education – Ellen Wilkinson – 1945
- Member of the House of Lords – Stella Isaacs, Marchioness of Reading – 1958
- Government Whip – Harriet Slater – 1964
- Minister of Pensions and National Insurance – Margaret Herbison – 1964
- Minister of Overseas Development – Barbara Castle – 1964
- Minister for Transport – Barbara Castle – 1965
- First Secretary of State – Barbara Castle – 1968
- Paymaster General – Judith Hart – 1968
- Secretary of State for Social Services (Health) – Barbara Castle – 1974
- Leader of the Opposition – Margaret Thatcher – 1975
- Prime Minister – Margaret Thatcher – 1979
- Leader of the House of Lords – Janet Young, Baroness Young – 1981
- Speaker of the House of Commons – Betty Boothroyd – 1992
- Minister of Agriculture, Fisheries and Food – Gillian Shephard – 1993
- Secretary of State for National Heritage (later Culture, Media and Sport) – Virginia Bottomley – 1995
- Secretary of State for Northern Ireland – Mo Mowlam – 1997
- President of the Board of Trade – Margaret Beckett – 1997
- Leader of the House of Commons – Ann Taylor – 1997
- Chief Whip – Ann Taylor – 1998
- Solicitor General for England and Wales – Harriet Harman – 2001
- Secretary of State for Scotland – Helen Liddell – 2001
- Deputy General Secretary of the Trades Union Congress – Frances O'Grady – 2003
- Foreign Secretary – Margaret Beckett – 2006
- Lord Speaker – Helene Hayman, Baroness Hayman – 2006
- Home Secretary – Jacqui Smith – 2007
- Attorney General – Baroness Scotland – 2007
- European Commissioner for Trade – Catherine Ashton – 2008
- Welsh Secretary – Cheryl Gillan – 2010
- General Secretary of the Trades Union Congress – Frances O'Grady – 2013
- Vice-President of the European Commission – Catherine Ashton – 2010
- Lord Chancellor – Liz Truss – 2016
- Chairman of Ways and Means – Eleanor Laing – 2020
- Chancellor of the Exchequer – Rachel Reeves – 2024

===== England =====
- Regent – Matilda (Maud) of Scotland – 12th century
- Monarch – Queen Mary I – 1553 (Note: Matilda, who 'reigned' for a few months in 1141, preceded Mary but is normally excluded from lists of English monarchs.)
- Mayor of a town in England (Aldeburgh) – Elizabeth Garrett Anderson – 1908
- Lord Mayor of Norwich – Ethel Colman – 1923
- Lord Mayor of Liverpool – Margaret Beavan – 1927
- Lord Mayor of Sheffield – Ann Eliza Longden – 1936
- Lord Mayor of York – Edna Annie Crichton – 1941
- Lord Mayor of Leeds – Jessie Beatrice Kitson – 1942 (succeeded upon the death in office of Arthur Clark)
- Lord Mayor of Plymouth – Jacquetta Marshall – 1950
- Lord Mayor of Newcastle-upon-Tyne – Violet Hardisty Grantham – 1952
- Lord Mayor of Leeds (elected) – Mary Pearce – 1958
- Lord Mayor of Bristol – Florence Mills Brown – 1963
- Lord Mayor of Kingston upon Hull – Annie Major – 1965
- Lord Mayor of Oxford – Florence Kathleen Lower – 1965
- Lord Mayor of Manchester – Nellie Beer – 1966
- Lord Mayor of Portsmouth – Phyllis Loe – 1972
- Lord Mayor of Birmingham – Marjorie Alice Brown – 1973
- Lord Mayor of London – Mary Donaldson – 1983
- Deputy Mayor of London – Nicky Gavron – 2000
- Chair of the London Assembly – Sally Hamwee – 2001
- Police and crime commissioner – Vera Baird, Ann Barnes, Katy Bourne, Jane Kennedy, Sue Mountstevens – 2012

===== Northern Ireland =====
====== Parliament of Northern Ireland ======
- Member of the House of Commons of Northern Ireland – Julia McMordie, Dehra Chichester – 1921
- High Sheriff of Belfast – Julia McMordie – 1928
- Minister of Health for Northern Ireland – Dehra Chichester – 1949
- Lord Mayor of Belfast – Grace Bannister – 1982

====== Northern Ireland Assembly ======
- Health Minister of Northern Ireland – Bairbre de Brún – 1999
- Presiding Officer of the Northern Ireland Assembly – Eileen Bell – 2007
- First Minister – Arlene Foster – 2016
- Minister of Justice – Claire Sugden – 2016

==== Scotland ====
- Monarch – Margaret I – 1286 (Queen-designate, never inaugurated)
- Regent – Joan Beaufort, Queen of Scotland – 1437
- Monarch (actually ruling) – Mary, Queen of Scots – 1542
- Lord provost – Lavinia Malcolm (in Dollar, Clackmannanshire) – 1913
- Lord Provost of Glasgow – Jean Roberts – 1960
- Lord Provost of Edinburgh – Eleanor McLaughlin – 1988
- Lord Provost of Aberdeen – Margaret Farquhar – 1996
- Lord Provost of Dundee – Helen Wright – 1999
- Solicitor General for Scotland – Elish Angiolini – 2001
- Lord Advocate – Elish Angiolini – 2006
- Leader of the Scottish Conservative Party – Annabel Goldie – 2006
- Deputy First Minister – Nicola Sturgeon – 2007
- Leader of the Scottish Labour Party – Wendy Alexander – 2007
- Foreign Minister – Linda Fabiani – 2007
- Presiding Officer of the Scottish Parliament – Tricia Marwick – 2011
- Leader of the Scottish National Party – Nicola Sturgeon – 2014
- First Minister – Nicola Sturgeon – 2014

==== Wales ====
- Lord Mayor of Cardiff – Helena Evans – 1959
- Presiding Officer of the National Assembly for Wales – Jane Davidson – 1999
- Deputy First Minister for Wales – Jenny Randerson – 2001
- Leader of Plaid Cymru – Leanne Wood – 2012
- First Minister – Eluned Morgan – 2024

== Vatican City ==
- Undersecretary of the Congregation for Institutes of Consecrated Life and Societies of Apostolic Life – Sister Enrica Rosanna – 2004
- Undersecretary of the Section for Relations with States (Vatican Secretariat of State) – Francesca Di Giovanni – 2020
- Prefect of the Dicastery for Institutes of Consecrated Life and Societies of Apostolic Life – Sister Simona Brambilla – 2024
- President of the Pontifical Commission for Vatican City State & President of the Governorate of Vatican City State – Sister Raffaella Petrini – 2025

== See also ==
- List of women heads of state
- List of the first LGBT holders of political offices
