= Jover =

Jover is a surname and given name.

== People with the surname ==
- Arly Jover (born 1971), Spanish actress
- Èric Jover (born 1977), Andorran politician
- José María Jover (1920–2006), Spanish historian
- Juan Jover (1903–1960), Spanish racing driver
- Lluís Companys i Jover (1882–1940), Catalan politician and 123rd President of Catalonia
- Loui Jover (born 1967), Australian painter and artist
- Luis Barceló Jover (1896–1939), Spanish military officer
- Manuel Jover (born 1960), French art critic and journalist
- María del Mar Jover (born 1988), Spanish long jumper
- Mateo Jover, Director of Research of the Interamerican Scout Office
- Nicolas Jover (born 1981), French football coach

== People with the given name ==
- Francisco Jover y Casanova (1836–1890), Spanish painter of historical scenes and portraits
- Gregorio Jover Cortés (1891–1964), Aragonese anarcho-syndicalist
- Jover Hernández, Cuban handball coach of the Cuban national team
- Alberto Jover Piamonte (1934–1998), Philippine Roman Catholic archbishop
- jover Jhobinson Gonzalez Silva ( 22-09-99) professional en el área de reparación de llantas
