= Hans Steiner (jurist) =

Swiss politician, lawyer, judge and university professor (1884–1964)

Federal Judge Hans Steiner
- Steiner portrayed by Eugen Roth in 1936

Federal Judge of the Federal Supreme Court of Switzerland
- In office 1924–1951

Member of the National Council (Switzerland)
- In office 1 December 1919 – 1 December 1924

Personal details
- Born: Hans Steiner; 7 January 1884 Schwyz, Switzerland
- Died: 8 September 1964 (aged 80) Schwyz, Switzerland
- Party: Catholic Conservative Party
- Spouse: Dora Schuler (m. 1913)
- Relations: Elisabeth Blunschy (daughter); Alfred Blunschy (son-in-law); Dominik Blunschy (great-grandson)

Hans Steiner also known as Hans Steiner-Schuler (7 January 1884 - 8 September 1964) was a Swiss federal judge, politician and jurist. Most notably he served as Federal Judge of the Federal Supreme Court of Switzerland from 1924 to 1951, from 1943 to 1944 as its president. He previously served on the National Council (Switzerland) from 1919 to 1924 and on the Cantonal Council of Schwyz from 1920 to 1925 (concurrently).

== Early life and education ==
Steiner was born 7 January 1884 in Schwyz, Switzerland, to Clemens Steiner, an architect, and Magdalena Steiner (née Hediger).

He completed compulsory schooling in Feldkirch and Schwyz before pursuing law studies at the University of Zurich, University of Berlin and at the University of Freiburg. He completed his JD (Dr. lic.iur.) at the University of Zurich. Additionally he completed a habilitation in Roman Law in 1913.

== Career ==
From 1914, Steiner was active as Privatdozent at the University of Zurich and ultimately from 1918 to 1920 as senior lecturer. Concurrently, he had a private law practice in Schwyz from 1911 to 1924. Between 1918 and 1922, Steiner held his first public office, as municipal councillor of Schwyz. He presided over the Orphanage Authority. He served as a member of the Cantonal Council of Schwyz from 1920 to 1925 for the Catholic Conservative Party. Steiner was a member of the National Council (Switzerland) from 1919 to 1924. Between 1924 and 1951 he served as Federal Judge of the Federal Supreme Court of Switzerland, from 1943 until 1944 as its president.

== Personal life ==
In 1913, Steiner married Dora Schuler, a daughter of Theodor Schuler who was a banker. He died on 8 September 1964 aged 80 in Schwyz. His daughter Elisabeth Blunschy was the first woman elected president of the National Council, his son-in-law Alfred Blunschy, also served on the Cantonal Council. His great-grandson, Dominik Blunschy, was elected in the National Council (Switzerland) during the 2023 Swiss federal election.
