= Erwin Nigg =

Swiss politician (1954–2026)

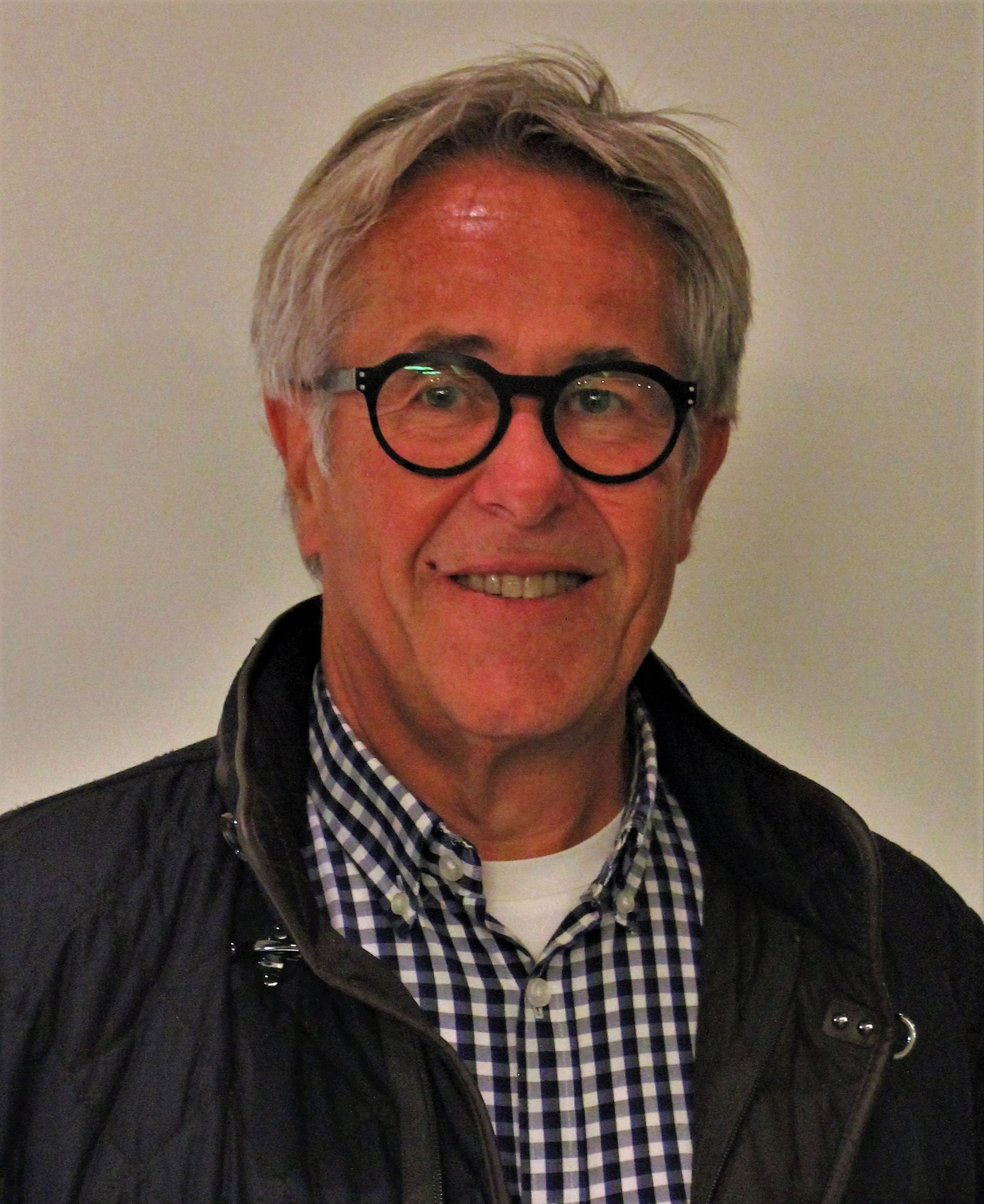
- Nigg in 2018

Member of the Cantonal Council of Schwyz
- In office 2000–2008
- In office 1988–1991

Personal details
- Born: Erwin Konrad Nigg; 7 September 1954 Gersau, Switzerland
- Died: 1 March 2026 (aged 71) Gersau, Switzerland
- Party: FDP
- Education: University of Zurich; University of Cincinnati – College-Conservatory of Music
- Occupation: Musician

Erwin Konrad Nigg (7 September 1954 – 1 March 2026) was a Swiss politician. A member of the Free Democratic Party, he served in the Cantonal Council of Schwyz from 1988 to 1991 and again from 2000 to 2008.

Nigg died in Gersau on 1 March 2026, at the age of 71.
