= Dominik Blunschy =

Swiss politician (born 1987)

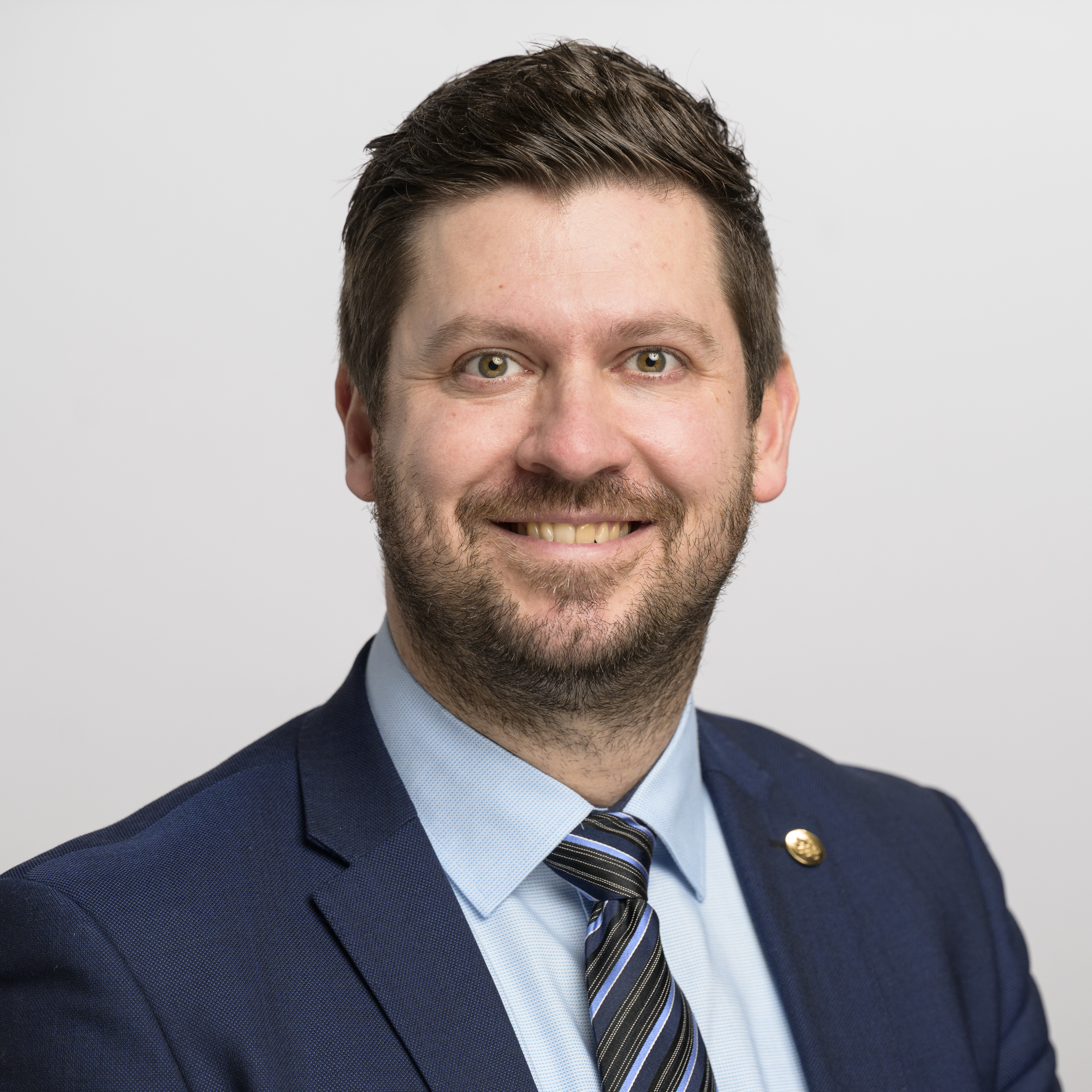
- Blunschy in 2023

Member of the National Council (Switzerland)
- Incumbent
- Assumed office 4 December 2023
- Constituency: Canton of Schwyz

Member of the Cantonal Council of Schwyz
- In office 29 June 2016 – 30 November 2023

Personal details
- Born: Dominik Blunschy; 27 October 1987 (age 38) Schwyz, Switzerland
- Party: The Centre
- Spouse: Virginia Wyss (m. 2021)
- Relations: Elisabeth Blunschy (grandmother); Hans Steiner (great-grandfather)
- Education: ETH Zurich (BSc Inf.-Ing.); ETH Zurich (MSc Inf.-Ing.)
- Occupation: Software engineer, politician
- Website: Official website Parliament website

Dominik Blunschy (Swiss Standard German: [ˈdoːminɪk ˈblʊnʃi]; born 27 October 1987) is a Swiss software engineer and politician who currently is member-elect of the National Council (Switzerland) for The Centre after being elected during the 2023 Swiss federal election. He assumed office on 4 December 2023.

Blunschy previously served on the Cantonal Council of Schwyz from 2016 to 2023 and concurrently as the president of the council from 2022 to 2023. He is the grandson of Elisabeth Blunschy, the first female president, of the National Council (Switzerland).

== Early life and education ==
Blunschy was born 27 October 1987 in Schwyz, Switzerland, to Felix Blunschy (1958-2014), who was formerly employed by Victorinox, and Monika Blunschy (née Imboden). He has two sisters.

He was raised in a political family in Ibach and Schwyz. His paternal grandparents, both attorneys, where both active politicians with his grandmother, Elisabeth Blunschy (née Steiner) serving on the National Council (Switzerland) from 1971 to 1987 for the Christian Democratic People's Party (predecessor of The Centre). In 1977, she presided the National Council as the first female in history. His grandfather, Alfred Blunschy (1921-1972), was a member of the Cantonal Council of Schwyz, from 1952 to 1972. His great-grandfather, Hans Steiner (1884-1964), also an attorney, served on the National Council from 1919 to 1924.

Blunschy completed a Bachelor of Science and a Master of Science in Information Technology at ETH Zurich.

== Career ==
Blunschy worked for a variety of software companies in Switzerland. He is currently employed as lead engineer at ti&m, a digital solutions agency, based in Zurich.

== Personal life ==
In 2021, he married Virginia (née Wyss), who is a professor for History and German.
