= Electoral firsts in Romania =

Electoral firsts in Romania.

== Women ==
=== Kingdom ===
- Mayor – Luiza Zavloschi, (Buda) – 1930

=== People's Republic ===
- Minister of Health - Florica Bagdasar - 1946
- Minister of Foreign Affairs – Ana Pauker – 1947
- Minister of Social Affairs – Stella Ernestu – 1952
- First Deputy Prime Minister – Elena Ceauşescu – 1980

=== Republic ===
- Minister of Education- Ecaterina Andronescu – 2000
- Minister of Justice – Monica Macovei – 2004
- Prefect (of Bucharest) – Mioara Mantale – 2004
- President of the Chamber of Deputies – Roberta Anastase – 2008
- Minister of Tourism – Elena Udrea – 2008
- European Commissioner for Regional Policy – Corina Crețu – 2014
- Prime Minister – Viorica Dăncilă – 2018
- President of the Senate – Anca Dragu – 2020
