= Július Brocka =

Slovak politician

Member of the National Council
- In office 23 June 1992 – 15 March 1994
- In office 14 December 1994 – 23 March 2016

Minister of Labour, Social Affairs and Family
- In office 15 March 1994 – 13 December 1994
- Prime Minister: Jozef Moravčík
- Preceded by: Oľga Keltošová
- Succeeded by: Oľga Keltošová

Personal details
- Born: 1 January 1957 (age 69) Modra, Czechoslovakia (now Slovakia)
- Party: Christian Democratic Movement
- Children: 4
- Education: Slovak University of Technology in Bratislava

Július Brocka (born 1 January 1957 in Modra) is a Slovak retired politician. In 1994 he briefly served as Labor minister in the technocratic government of Jozef Moravčík. From 1992 to 2016 he served as a Member of the National Council in the caucus of the Christian Democratic Movement.

Brocka studied Civil Engineering at the Slovak University of Technology in Bratislava, graduating in 1981. Before entering politics, he worked as an engineer.

Brocka has four children.
