= Margrit Weber-Röllin =

Swiss schoolteacher and politician (1937–2024)

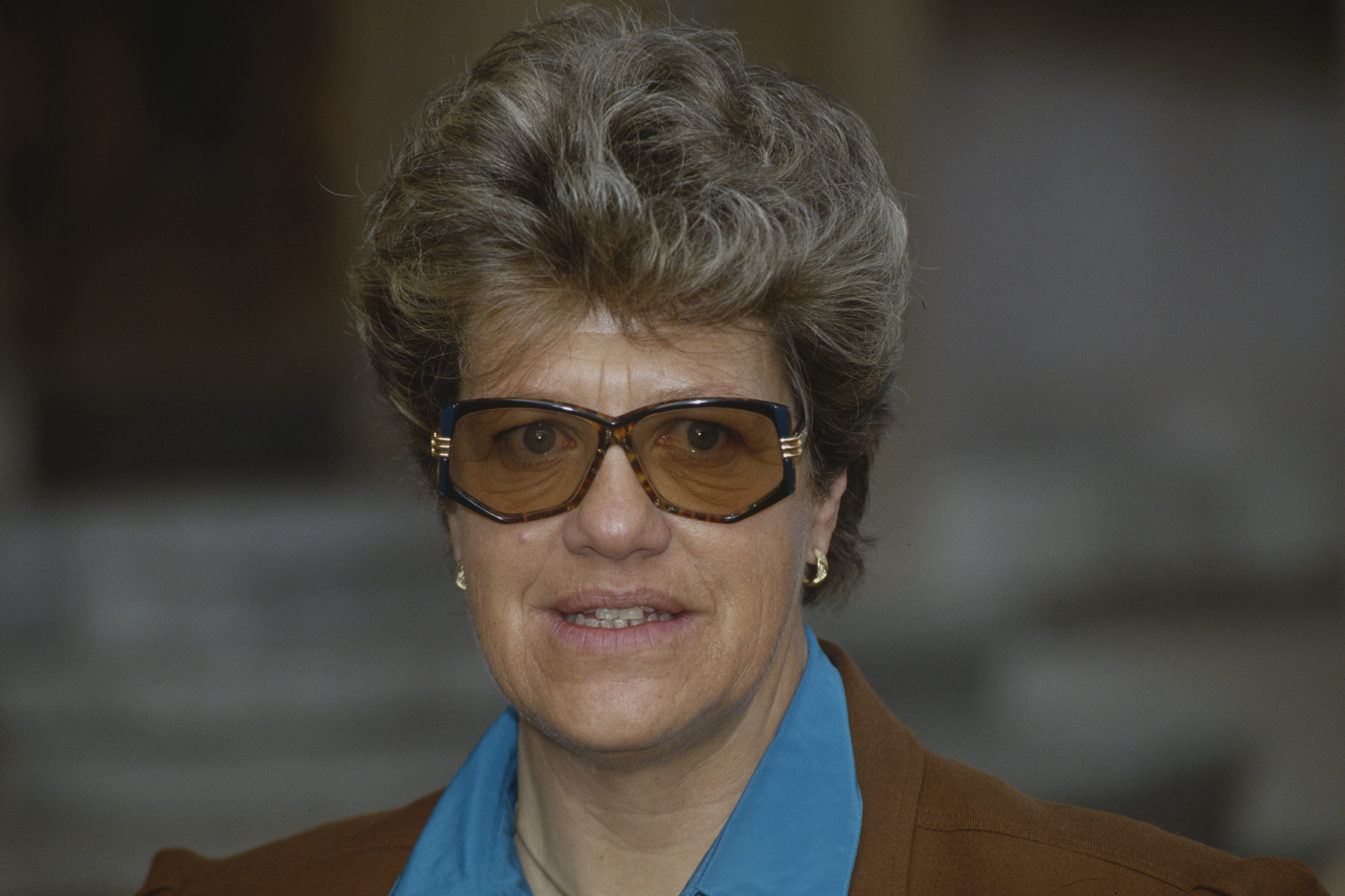
- Weber-Röllin in 1992

Member of the Cantonal Council of Schwyz
- In office 1980–1988

Personal details
- Born: Margrit Röllin; 14 August 1937 Baar, Switzerland
- Died: 6 March 2024 (aged 86) Pfäffikon, Schwyz, Switzerland
- Party: CVP
- Education: Theresianum Ingenbohl
- Occupation: Schoolteacher

Margrit Weber-Röllin (14 August 1937 – 6 March 2024) was a Swiss schoolteacher and politician. A member of the Christian Democratic People's Party of Switzerland, she was the first woman to serve in the Cantonal Council of Schwyz (from 1980 to 1988) and the first woman to be Landammann of Schwyz.

Weber-Röllin died in Pfäffikon, Schwyz on 6 March 2024 at the age of 86.
