= Ministry of Finance (Andorra) =

Government ministry of Andorra

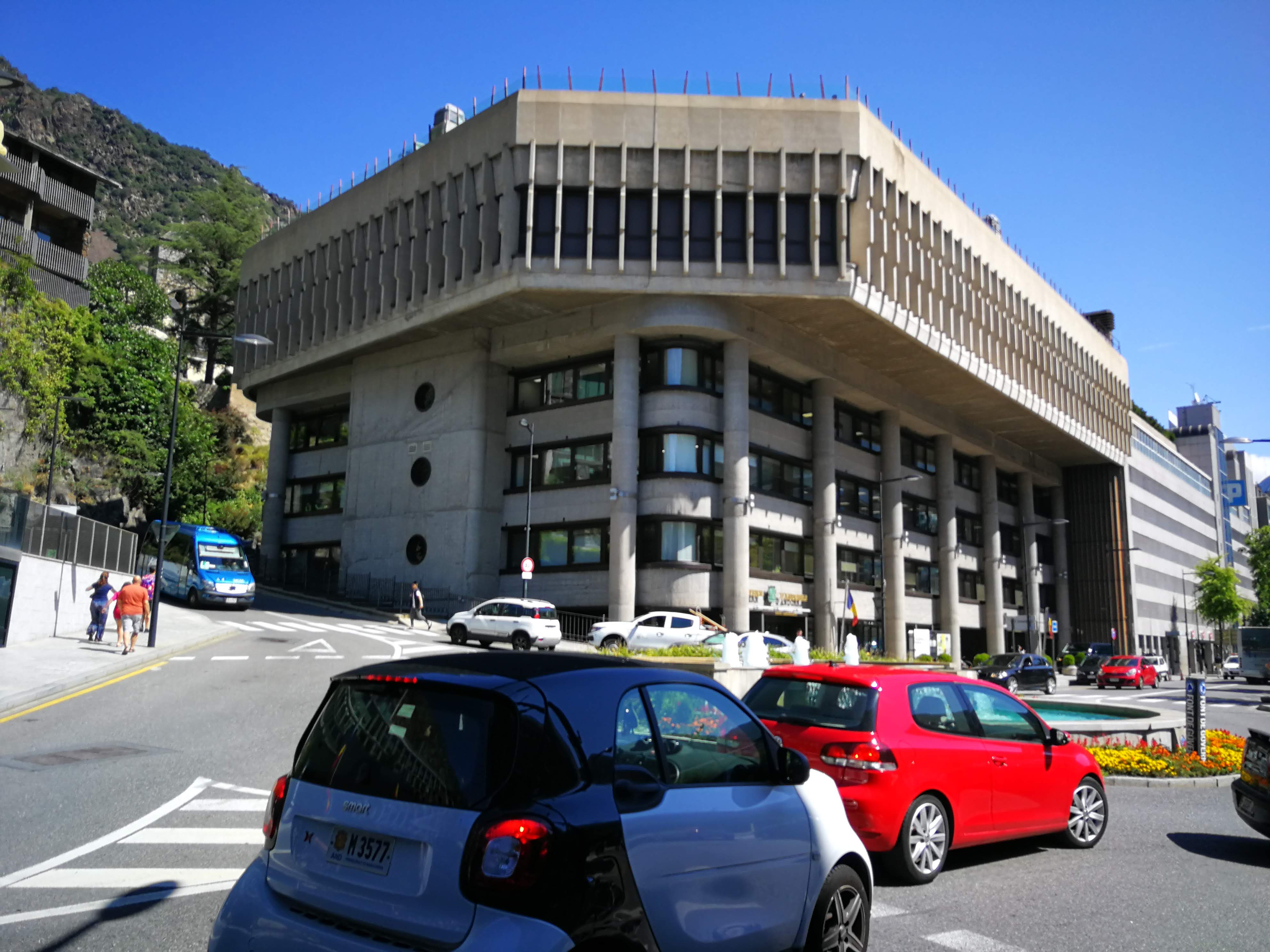
Prat de la Creu, 62-64, Andorra la Vella

The Ministry of Finance (Catalan: Ministeri de Finances d'Andorra) is the Andorran government ministry in charge of public finances of Andorra. The ministry is located in Prat de la Creu, 62-64, Andorra la Vella.

== Ministers of Finance ==
- Jaume Bartumeu Cassany, January 1990 - May 1992
- Josep Casal Casal, May 1992 - December 1994
- Susagna Arasanz Serra, December 1994 - April 2001
- Mireia Maestre Cortadella, April 2001 - June 2005
- Ferran Mirapeix Lucas June 2005 - June 2009
- Pere López Agràs, June 2009 - May 2011
- Jordi Cinca Mateos, May 2011 - May 2019
- Èric Jover, May 2019 - January 2023
- César Marquina, January 2023 -

== See also ==
- Executive Council of Andorra
- Economy of Andorra
