= Èric Jover =

Andorran politician (born 1977)

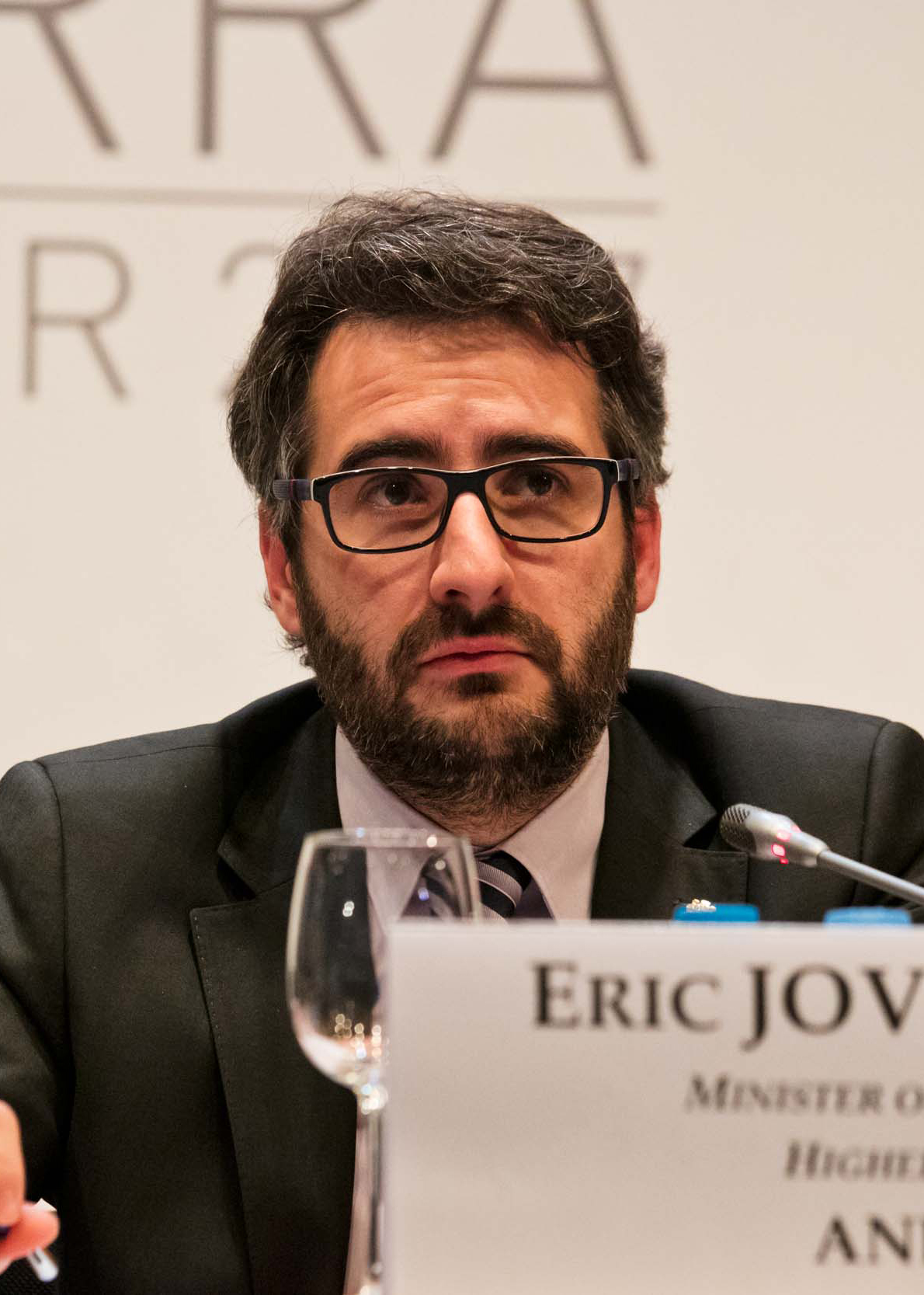
- Jover in 2017

Minister of Finance
- In office 22 May 2019 – 9 January 2023
- Prime Minister: Xavier Espot Zamora
- Preceded by: Jordi Cinca
- Succeeded by: César Marquina

Minister of Education of Andorra
- In office 1 April 2015 – 22 May 2019
- Prime Minister: Antoni Martí
- Preceded by: Roser Suñé Pascuet
- Succeeded by: Ester Vilarrubla Escales

Personal details
- Born: Èric Jover Comas; November 1977 (age 48) Escaldes-Engordany
- Party: Democrats for Andorra
- Education: University of Barcelona

Èric Jover Comas (born November 1977) is an Andorran politician and member of the Democrats for Andorra (DA) political party. Jover served as the Minister of Finance of Andorra from 22 May 2019 until his resignation in January 2023. He previously served as Minister of Education.

On 12 October 2020, Jover announced that he had tested positive for COVID-19, becoming the country's highest profile official to become infected during the COVID-19 pandemic in Andorra so far. Several members of the Andorran government self quarantined in response to Jover's diagnosis, including Cèsar Marquina, Marc Ballestà, Guillem Casal, Mònica Bonell Tuset, and Lara Vilamala.
