= Josi Meier =

Swiss politician (1926–2006)

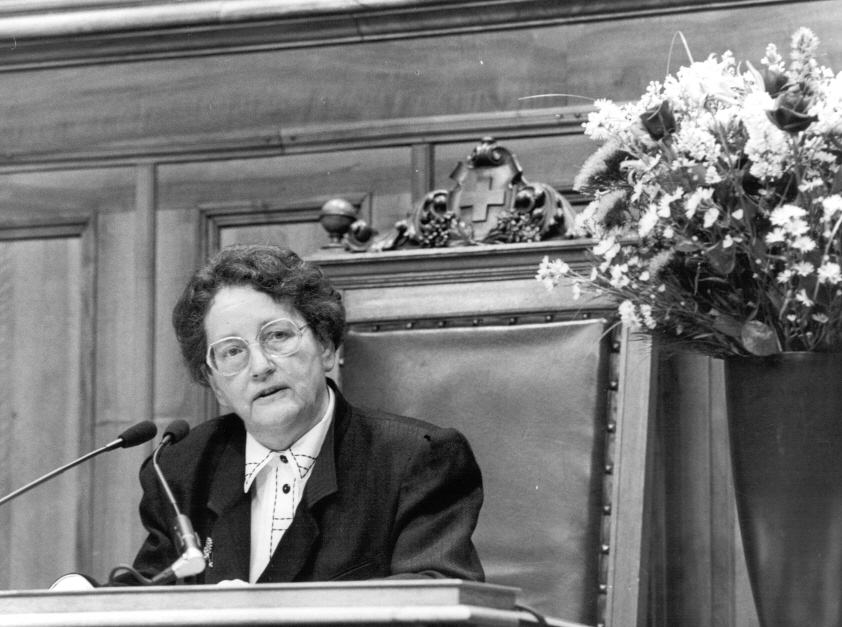
- Born: Josephine Johanna Meier; 31 August 1926; Dagmersellen, Switzerland
- Died: 4 November 2006 (aged 80); Lucerne, Switzerland
- Education: University of Geneva
- Occupations: Attorney; politician

Josephine Johanna "Josi" Meier (31 August 1926 in Dagmersellen – 4 November 2006 in Lucerne) was a Swiss politician and feminist. She was one of the first women in the Swiss parliament and had been called the "Grand Old Lady" of Swiss politics. She served as a member of the Christian Democratic People's Party of Switzerland. She was the first woman President of the Swiss Council of States.

== Early life ==
Meier was born in 1926 in Dagmersellen in the Canton of Lucerne. Her parents were Nicholas Meier, a hotel porter, and Josi Kumschick, a waitress and housewife. During her childhood, the family moved to the city of Lucerne. She attended the University of Geneva to study law and became a registered lawyer in 1952.

== Political career ==
From 1959 to 1971, Meier was a member of the secondary school board in Lucerne and was a strong supporter of women's suffrage. In 1971—the same year that Switzerland granted women the right to vote—Meier was voted into Lucerne's cantonal parliament and subsequently, as a member of the Christian Democratic People's Party of Switzerland, became one of the first 11 women elected to the Swiss lower house, the National Council. During her term in the National Council, she chaired the Commission for Foreign Affairs and was a delegate to the Council of Europe. She was elected to Switzerland's senate, the Council of States, in 1983, and became its first female president (speaker) in 1991. She held the post of president until 1992. Meier left the Council of States and retired from Swiss politics in 1995.

== Death and legacy ==
Meier died in Lucerne on 4 November 2006, a decade after being diagnosed with cancer. She continued practicing law until her death. Her political achievements earned her the nicknames of the "Grand Old Lady" of Swiss politics and the "old warhorse of Lucerne". She was awarded honorary doctorates from the University of Fribourg in 1991 and the University of Lucerne in 1994. As an advocate of women's participation in politics, she once declared that "Frauen gehören ins Haus, ins Bundeshaus!" (English: "Women belong in the house ... in the House of Parliament!").

Preceded by Arthur Hänsenberger	President of the Council of States; 1991/1992	Succeeded by Otto Piller
