= Evdokia Uralova =

Evdokia Ilyinichna Uralova (1902-1985) was a Soviet-Belarusian Politician (Communist).

She served as Minister of Education in 1946-1947.
