= Olga Martynovna Auguste =

Latvian politician

Olga Martynovna Auguste (1896-1973) was a Soviet-Latvian Politician (Communist).

She served as People's Commissar of State Control between 13 March and 29 April 1941. She was the first female government minister in Latvia.
