= Jordi Cinca =

Andorran politician

Jordi Cinca Mateos (born in Andorra la Vella, 26 July 1965) is an Andorran politician who was Minister of Finance between 2011 and 2019. In 2020 he joined the Retirement Reserve Fund, and has served as President of the Management Committee since then.

== Early life ==
Cinca was born in Andorra la Vella in 1965. He has a degree in business management and administration and two postgraduate degrees. One postgraduate degree is in PDD from IESE and another is in financial management from IEF. After graduating, he was secretary general and government spokesman from January 1990 to December 1993, then general counsel from 1993 to 1996. From 1995 to 2000 he was financial director and partner of Orfund. In 2009 he became Director of Commercial Banking and Marketing for Crèdit Andorra.

== Career ==
From 2011 to 2019 he was Minister of Finance of Andorra. In 2020 he joined the Retirement Reserve Fund. In 2024 he was President of the Management Committee of the Retirement Reserve Fund at the General Council. During his time as president, he warned that the rise in high-cost medicine and ageing would lead to the fund not working, and said it needed to be improved to long-term.

== Controversies ==
He was named in the 2016 Panama Papers leak. In November 2016 he was sued by ex-president of the Orfund company Joan Samarra Naudi for unfair competition, theft, and money laundering in Liberia when he headed the Orfund company previously. In response, in January 2017, the government of Andorra responded by stating they were confident in Cinca, and said that there was erroneous and biased news from the media on the case. In 2024 he was summoned after his business partner Manuel Terrén was sentenced to prison for his role in the Orfund Group and trafficking of blood diamonds during the civil war in Sierra Leone. He was directly accused of inhumane conditions in blood mines by workers.
