= Ministry of Justice (Abkhazia) =

The Ministry of Justice of the Republic of Abkhazia is a body of state administration in the Republic of Abkhazia that ensures the implementation of the state policy in the sphere of notaries, registrars, advocates, ensuring the established order of the courts and execution of judicial acts, registration of public associations, political parties and movements, enterprises, organizations and institutions.

Regulations on the Ministry of Justice of the Republic of Abkhazia approved the Resolution of the Cabinet of Ministers of the Republic of Abkhazia of March 17, 1995 No. 59.

The new regulation on the Ministry of Justice was adopted on May 27, 2005 under No. 112.

== Structure of the Ministry of Justice of Abkhazia ==
- Office of the Ministry
- Republican Scientific Research Institute of Forensic Expertise
- Notary offices of the Republic of Abkhazia:
- Notary office No. 1, Sukhumi city
- Notary Office No. 2, Sukhumi
- Notary office No. 3 in Sukhumi
- Notary office No. 4, Sukhumi
- Notary Office No. 5, Sukhumi
- Notary office No. 6 in Sukhumi
- Notary office No. 1 of the Sukhumi district
- Notary office No. 2 of the Sukhumi district
- Notary office No. 1 of the Gulriprshi district
- Notary office No. 2 of the Gulriprshi district
- New Athos city notary office
- Notary office No. 1 of Gudauta district
- Notary office No. 2 of Gudauta district
- Notary office No. 1 of Gagra district
- Notary office No. 2 of Gagra district
- Notary office in Gantiadi village
- Notary office of Bichvinta settlement
- Notary office of Ochamchire district
- Notary office of Tkvarcheli district
- Notary office of Gali district
- ZAGS of the Republic of Abkhazia:
- ZAGS city of Sukhumi
- Registrar of the Sukhumi district
- Registry office of Gulriprshi district
- Registry Office in New Athos
- Registry office of Gudauta district
- ZAGS Gagra district
- Registry office in Bichvinta
- Ochamchyrsky district registry office
- Registry Office of Tkvarcheli district
- Registry office of Gali district
- Republican Civil Registry Office

== List of ministers ==
No.	Full name	Rank	Date of appointment	Date of release	Notes
1	Batal Tabagua		1995	2003	
2	Lakerbaia Tengiz Igorevich		2003	7 April 2005	
3	Liudmila Khojashvili [1st female]	counselor of the first class	7 April 2005	October 31, 2011	Decree of the President of the Republic of Abkhazia No. УП-76; Decree No. UP-51 of February 26, 2010 confirmed the position
4	Onishenko Ekaterina Vladimirovna		October 31, 2011^{[4]}	н.в.	
5	Marina Pilia		2014	present	

== See also ==
- Justice ministry
- Министерство юстиции Республики Абхазия (Ministry of Justice of the Republic of Abkhazia)
- Politics of Abkhazia
