= Olga Adellach Coma =

Andorran politician (born 1966)

Olga Adellach Coma (born 16 March 1966) is an Andorran politician. She is a member of the Liberal Party of Andorra. She has been an elected member of the general council since 2001.
