= Rema Svetlova =

Armenian politician (1927–2014)

Rema Khristoforovna Svetlova (Armenian: Ռեմա Քրիստափորի Սվետլովա; Russian: Рема Христофоровна Светлова; 19 October 1927, Yerevan – 15 February 2014, Yerevan) was an Armenian politician.

She was appointed Deputy Premier Minister in 1975. She was awarded two Orders of the Badge of Honour, and an Order of the Red Banner of Labour.
