= Elsa Gretškina =

Estonian Soviet politician

Elsa Gretškina (Russian: Эльза Робертовна Гречкина; born Elsa Krensman; 15 April 1932 – 20 October 2014) was a Soviet-Estonian politician (Communist) and educator. She served as Minister of Education of the Estonian Soviet Socialist Republic from 1980 until 1988. She was known both for implementing Soviet language policies in Estonia and for introducing educational reforms.

== Early life ==
Elsa Gretškina was born on 15 April 1932 in Siiverska village, Gatchina District, Leningrad Oblast. Her father, Robert Krensman, was an ethnic Estonian from Saaremaa. Her mother, Maria, was Ingrian Finnish.

During the Second World War, the family was evacuated to Vologda Oblast as German forces approached the region. They returned to Siiverska in 1944 after the war front had moved westward.

After finishing secondary school, Gretškina studied at the Leningrad Food Industry Technical School. Although she wanted to specialize in confectionery production, she was assigned to the liquor and vodka production department.

In 1951, Gretškina moved to Tallinn after graduating from technical school. When she arrived in Estonia, she spoke very little Estonian. Within a few months, she learned to communicate in the language, helped by her knowledge of Finnish. She began working at the Tallinn Liquor and Vodka Factory. At first, she worked as an ordinary employee and later became head of the liquor production department and a Komsomol secretary.

In 1961, she graduated from the Eduard Vilde Tallinn Pedagogical Institute with a degree in Russian language and literature.

== Career in Komsomol and the Communist Party ==
Gretškina began her political career in the Komsomol, the Communist youth organization. She joined the Communist Party of the Soviet Union in 1954.

During the 1950s and 1960s, she held several positions in Tallinn's Komsomol and Communist Party organizations. In 1967, she entered the Academy of Social Sciences under the CPSU Central Committee in Moscow. She completed her studies in 1970 and earned the degree of Candidate of Historical Sciences in party history.

After returning to Estonia, she worked in senior positions responsible for propaganda, science, and education within the Estonian Communist Party. In 1976, she became a member of the Central Committee of the Communist Party of Estonia. She also served as a deputy in the Supreme Soviet of the Estonian SSR.

== Minister of Education ==
From 1980 to 1988, Gretškina served as Minister of Education of the Estonian SSR.

Her tenure remains controversial. Her role in Soviet educational policy has drawn criticism, particularly regarding the Soviet policy of Russification, which increased the role of the Russian language in Estonia's education system. At the same time, her contributions to school administration and educational reform continue to be recognized by some educators and historians.

In 1988, she received the honorary title of Distinguished Education Worker of the Estonian SSR.

== Later Career ==
After Estonia regained independence, Gretškina remained active in education. She worked at Akadeemia Nord, served as development director of the Russian Private Gymnasium "Polüloog," and later became vice-rector for academic affairs at the Raiment Transport Institute.

She joined the Estonian Centre Party in 1998. In 1996, she ran as a candidate for the Mustamäe district council.

== Publications ==
- Party Organizations’ Propaganda Activities. Eesti Raamat, 1975
- Middle Classes on the Road to Socialism. Eesti Raamat, Tallinn 1976
- The Working Class – the Decisive Force of the Tenth Five-Year Plan (with Jevdokia Madise). Eesti Raamat, Tallinn 1978
- On Shaping the Political Awareness of the Population: A Guide for Lecturers. Eesti NSV Ühing "Teadus", Tallinn 1984
- Contributions to Vene Eragümnaasium "Polüloog", 1998
- Project "Open Curriculum" in Estonia’s Renewing Education: An Innovation Perspective. Ministry of Education, Tallinn 2001
- Question Formulation: Awareness of One’s Participation (Adapted Methodology). Ministry of Education, Tallinn 2001
- School Development Plan and Curriculum Analysis Guidelines: A Cultural-Integration Approach (with Lilian-Astrid Kiv; foreword by Toivo Sikk). Ilo, Tallinn 2003
- Why I Studied Liquor and Vodka Production in a Technical School. Õpetajate Leht, 14 August 2009

== Personal life ==
Gretškina had one daughter, Irina Antonjuk, who became principal of Haabersti Russian Gymnasium in Tallinn.
