= Maria Milczarek =

Polish politician (1929–2011)

Maria Milczarek (1929-2011) was a Polish politician (Communist). She was the Cabinet Minister of Administration, Land Economy and Environment in 1976–1979, and Minister of Labor, Welfare and Social Policy in 1979–1980.
