= Manuel Jover =

French art critic

Manuel Jover (born 1960) is a French art critic and journalist.

He regularly publishes reviews in magazines and has edited issues of Connaissance des arts magazine. He also publishes a weekly article in La Croix.

== Biography ==
Manuel Jover regularly publishes art reviews in magazines. He contributes to special issues of the magazine Connaissance des arts. He writes a weekly column for the newspaper La Croix (newspaper).

== Works ==
- (in French) Le Christ dans l'art, Sauret, 1994 ISBN 978-2850510144.
- (in French) Ingres, Pierre Terrail, 2005 ISBN 978-2879392875.
  - (in English) Ingres, Pierre Terrail, 2005 ISBN 978-2879392899.
- (in French) Caravage, Pierre Terrail, 2006 ISBN 978-2879393216.
- (in French) Courbet, Pierre Terrail, 2007 ISBN 978-2879393346.
- (in French) Moi, Gustave Courbet. Un livre d'art et d'activités, Pierre Terrail, 2007 ISBN 978-2879393414.
- (in French) (M. Naumovitz, translator.) Pandini peintre : Reliefs, L'Harmattan, 2007 ISBN 978-2296015982.
- (in French) Reimpre, Fragments International, 2011 ISBN 978-2917160220.
