= Soňa Pennigerová =

Czech politician (born 1928)

Soňa Pennigerová (born 26 October 1928) is a former Czech politician.

She was appointed Speaker of the Chamber of People of the Federal Assembly in 1969.
