= Růžena Urbánková =

Czechoslovak politician

Minister of Posts and Telecommunications
- In office 29 September 1969 – 3 January 1971

Personal details
- Born: 14 December 1912 České Budějovice, Austria-Hungary

Růžena Urbánková (14 December 1912, České Budějovice – ?) was a Czech politician.

She was appointed Minister of Post and Telecommunication in 1969.
