= Oľga Keltošová =

Slovak diplomat and politician (born 1943)

- Born: Oľga Suchalová; 27 February 1943 (age 83); Pezinok, Slovakia
- Occupations: Politician, journalist
- Years active: 1968-2010

Olga Keltošová (née Suchalová; 27 February 1943 in Pezinok) is a former Slovak politician. Before the break-up of Czechoslovakia, she served as Vice President of the Slovak National Council. She was a parliamentary deputy and one of the chief spokespersons for HZDS. From 1992 to 1997, Keltošová was the country's Minister of Labour, Social Affairs and Family. In 1998, she served briefly as Slovakia's ambassador to the United Nations. Subsequently, she became mayor of the borough of Lamač.

== Biography ==
Oľga Suchalová was born on 27 February 1943 in Pezinok, Slovakia. Her family moved to Bratislava when she was five and she undertook her preliminary education there. In 1966, she completed her journalism studies at Comenius University in Bratislava and she married briefly, but her husband chose to remain in the UK to study and they were divorced within a year. Until it was banned in 1968, she wrote for the student magazine, Echo Bratislava Vysokoškolákov. When the government crackdown on journalists started, she was limited to working on the children's section of such magazines as Včielku and Zorničku a Ohník or doing interpretation translation work. She married a freelance writer, Vlado Bednár, with whom she had two children, but they divorced in 1982. She married her third husband Peter Keltoš in 1999.

After the Velvet Revolution in 1989, she became the spokesperson of the Slovak Democratic Party (Slovak: Demokratická strana) (DS), was elected as a member of parliament, and became Vice-President of the Slovak National Council. In 1992, after the dissolution of Czechoslovakia, Keltošová joined the Movement for a Democratic Slovakia (Slovak: Hnutie za demokratické Slovensko) (HZDS) and served as the Minister of Labour, Social Affairs and Family. In 1994 she was returned to parliament and served again as Minister of Labour, until 1998, when she was appointed as ambassador of Slovakia to the United Nations. After serving only seven months, she was recalled from the post when her party lost the national elections.

Beginning in 2001, she lectured in political science at several universities and served on the city council of the Bratislavan borough of Lamač until 2006. In 2007, she was elected as mayor of Lamač serving until 2010.

== See also ==
- List of the first female holders of political offices in Europe
