= Tamara Lasjkarasjvili =

Soviet-Georgian politician

Tamara Lasjkarasjvili (Georgian: თამარ ლაშქარაშვილი; March 23, 1916 – May 23, 2001) was a Soviet-Georgian politician (Communist).

She served as Minister of Education from 1960 to 1976.
