= Zinaida Kvachadze =

Soviet agricultural and political activist

Zinaida Arsenyevna Kvachadze (Russian: Зинаида Арсеньевна Квачадзе, Georgian: ზინაიდა კვაჭაძე; 25 September 1921 in Batumi – 2005 in Tbilisi) was a Soviet and Georgian politician.

She was appointed Minister of Trade in 1957.
