= Paula Prioteasa =

Romanian politician

Paula Prioteasa (born 1936) was a Romanian politician (Communist). She served as Minister of the Food Industry in 1986.
