= Yevdokya Karpova =

Soviet communist politician (1923–2000)

Yevdokya Fyodorovna Karpova (Russian: Евдокия Фёдоровна Карпова; March 8, 1923 – December 5, 2000) was a Soviet and Russian politician and member of the Communist Party of the Soviet Union.

She was vice-chairman of the Council of Ministers of the RSFSR in 1966–1987.
