= Elisabeth Blunschy =

Swiss politician

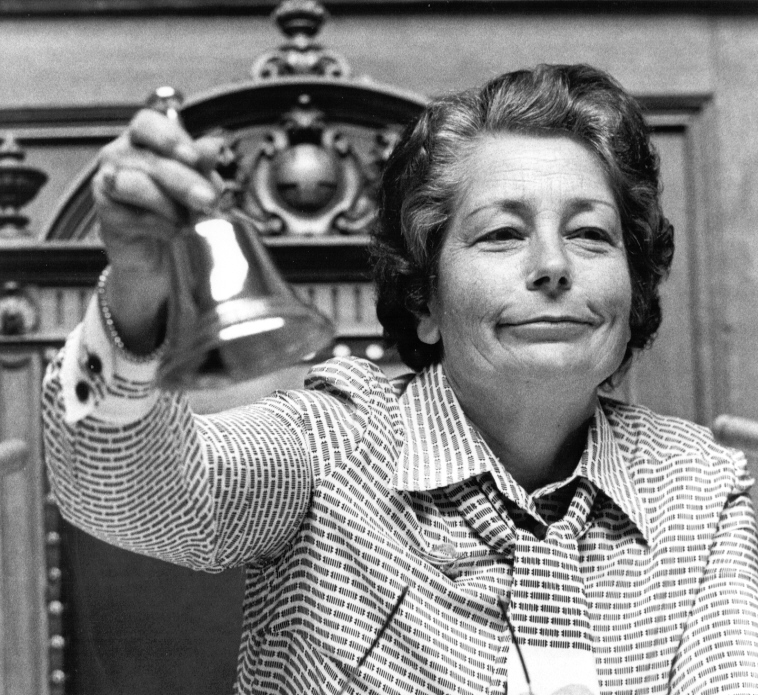

Member of the National Council of Switzerland
- In office 29 November 1971 – 29 November 1987

President of the National Council of Switzerland
- In office 2 May 1977 – 28 November 1977

Personal details
- Born: Elisabeth Steiner; 13 July 1922 Schwyz, Switzerland
- Died: 1 May 2015 (aged 92) Schwyz, Switzerland
- Party: Christian Democratic People's Party of Switzerland
- Spouse: Alfred Blunschy (m. 1947)
- Relations: Dominik Blunschy (grandson)
- Parent: Hans Steiner (father)

Elisabeth Blunschy (née Steiner; 13 July 1922 – 1 May 2015) was a Swiss politician. She served as the first woman President of the National Council of Switzerland and was one of the first women elected to the National Council of Switzerland.

== Biography ==
Elisabeth Blunschy was born on 13 July 1922 in Schwyz. Her father, Hans Steiner, was a politician who served as a federal judge and a member of the National Council. She was raised in Lausanne and attended high school in Fribourg. She then studied law at the University of Lausanne and the University of Fribourg. She became the first women in her canton to be admitted to the bar. After her studies, she worked as a lawyer for several years. She became president of the Swiss Catholic Women's Association and then Caritas Switzerland, a social justice organization.

In 1971, she won a seat in the National Council. Although women won the right to vote in federal elections earlier that year, her home Canton of Schwyz voted against women’s suffrage and did not give women the right to vote in cantonal elections until 1972.

In May 1977, Hans Wyer, the incumbent National Council President, resigned after winning election to the Council of State of Valais. Blunschy was elected to serve out his term, becoming the first woman to serve as president of that body. The term as president lasted only seven months, after which she return to regular service in the council.

After the 1987 Swiss federal election, Blunschy left office and did not remain active in politics.

== Personal life ==
She was married to Alfred Blunschy and had three children. Alfred died in 1972.

Elisabeth Blunschy died on 1 May 2015 at the age of 92.
