= Susagna Arasanz =

Andorran politician (died 2021)

Susagna Arasanz i Serra (1960/1961 – 14 October 2021) was an Andorran economist and politician, Minister of Finance of Andorra between 1994 and 2000, becoming the first woman to hold the office, under the premiership of Marc Forné.

== Career ==
On 22 December 1994, Forné named her the new minister of Finance, replacing Josep Casal Casa. She was elected member of the General Council of Andorra in the 1997 parliamentary election and on 1 April 1997 she was re-appointed minister of Finance resigning as lawmaker two weeks later. She was a member of the Liberal Party of Andorra. On 15 March 2000 Susagna Arasanz resigned as minister.

She was a member of the Andorran Social Security Fund's (CASS) Board of Directors since she was appointed by the government of Andorra in January 2020.

== Death ==
Arasanz died on 14 October 2021 at the age of 60 from cancer.
