= Nada Tešanović =

Bosnian Croat politician

Member of the National Assembly of Republika Srpska
- In office 2002–2010

Deputy Prime Minister of Republika Srpska
- In office 2012–2014

Minister for Family, Youth, and Sports
- In office 2010–2014

Chair of the People's Council
- In office 2014–2022

Personal details
- Born: 11 July 1952 (age 74) Banja Luka, People's Republic of Bosnia and Herzegovina, Yugoslavia
- Party: Alliance of Independent Social Democrats
- Education: University of Zagreb

Nada Tešanović (born 11 July 1952) is a Bosnian Croat politician. Born in Banja Luka, she was educated at the University of Zagreb and was a professor at the University of Banja Luka Faculty of Economics (1977-2006). After serving in the City Assembly of Banja Luka from 2000 until 2002, she was member of the National Assembly from 2002 to 2010, Minister for Family, Youth, and Sports from 2010 to 2014, deputy prime minister of Republika Srpska from 2012 until 2014, and chair of the People's Council from 2014 until 2022.

== Biography ==
Nada Tešanović was born in Banja Luka on 11 July 1952 and was educated at the local primary school and gymnasium and at the University of Zagreb Faculty of Economics. In addition to local secondary schools, she worked as a professor at University of Banja Luka Faculty of Economics from 1977 until 2006.

Tešanović became a member of the Social Liberal Party (SLS-SR) in 1993. After being a non-winning candidate in the 1998 Republika Srpska general election, she was elected to the City Assembly of Banja Luka in 2000 and became its mayor the same year. She remained in the Assembly until 2002, when she was elected to the National Assembly in the general election.

In 2006, Tešanović was re-elected to the Assembly and became vice president, holding the position until 2010. Despite being re-elected in 2010, she stepped down to become Minister for Family, Youth, and Sports, serving until 2014. She was deputy prime minister of Republika Srpska from 2012 until 2014 and chair of the People's Council from 2014 until 2022. During the Rajko Kuzmanović administration, she was awarded the Order of Njegoš, 2nd class.

In 2004, Tešanović became vice president of the SLS-SR's successor party, the Alliance of Independent Social Democrats (SNSD), and held this position until 2015. In 2012, she became president of the SNSD's Active Women committee.

Tešanović has two children with her husband Dojčin Tešanović. She is a Bosnian Croat.
