= Petra Dode =

Albanian politician

Petra Dode was an Albanian politician.

She was appointed Chairperson of the State-Planning Committee in the Council of Ministers in 1972.
