= Loui Jover =

Australian painter and artist (born 1967)

- Born: 18 April 1967 (age 59); Yugoslavia
- Known for: Ink-style paintings using paper samples
- Style: Ink wash paintings

Loui Jover (born April 1967) is an Australian painter and artist. He was born in Serbia but moved to Australia at a young age, where he has lived since. He is known for his artwork in ink wash paintings on vintage book pages. Jover started his work on art in his childhood, but did not start public art until 1989, when he joined the Australian army as an illustrator and photographer.

== Early life ==
During his developmental years, Jover focused his childhood drawing habits into filling books with self-made cartoons and sketches. He maintained a constant drawing routine that allowed his technical skills to progress uninterrupted, eventually expanding his practice into painting with acrylics, oils, collages, and sculptures. He studied contemporary art, advanced visual communication, and commercial art at Melbourne Art Institute, Gold Coast Technical College, and at a visual training institute in Sydney, while developing a number of distinct styles and approaches.

== Artworks ==
In 2017, Jover designed the cover artwork for singer Camila Cabello's singles "Crying in the Club" and "I Have Questions." He has also worked on some sculptural pieces, but is mainly known for his ink wash pieces on old book pages. He reclaims the pages from damaged books that are otherwise headed for destruction. Jover utilizes a collage technique where he adheres vintage book pages together to form a singular large sheet as a base for his figurative and abstract ink drawings. His specific assembly method has since been adopted by other contemporary artists globally. He considers himself a melancholic artist and loves the idea of negative nostalgia or feeling sad about a backstory or history- whether it's his own or somebody else's, or even an object. He typically works in small segments and comes back to pieces every now and then to finish them in small chunks. This way, he can channel whatever emotion he is feeling at the time into different parts of the picture.

== Inspiration ==
Jover says that he has always had a passion for books; he was inspired much by his father, an intense creative whose constant work on projects conditioned Jover to view art as an essential lifestyle and means of personal expression rather than a purely commercial pursuit. He began imitating his father by drawing from a very young age. However, his understanding of artistic freedom expanded significantly after a chance discovery of a book by Pablo Picasso in his youth. Jover noted that the book demonstrated to him that art has no boundaries, teaching him that anything is possible on a picture plane and is limited only by an artist's imagination.
