= Emília Janečková-Muríňová =

Slovak politician (1918–2012)

Emília Janečková-Muríňová (22 August 1918, Vienna – 25 December 2012) was a Slovak politician.

She was appointed Commissioner for Health and Social Welfare (equivalent to minister) in 1950.
