= Eiske ten Bos-Harkema =

Dutch politician (1885–1962)

Eiske ten Bos-Harkema (4 June 1885 — 23 January 1962) was a Dutch politician.

She became the first Alderman in The Netherlands in 1924.
