= Agrippina Nikitichna Krachun =

Soviet Moldavian politician

Agrippina Nikitichna Krachun (born 1911) was a Soviet Moldavian politician.

She served as Deputy Chairperson of the Council of Ministers in 1955, Minister of Education in 1959–1961, and Secretary of the Presidium of the Supreme Soviet in 1961–1975.
