= Luiza Zavloschi =

Romanian politician

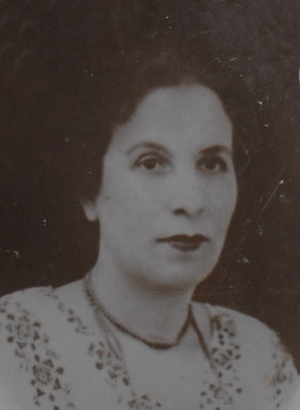
Luiza Zavloschi

Luiza Zavloschi (1883-1967) was a Romanian politician. She served as mayor of Buda in Vaslui County for two terms from 1930, and is known as the first female mayor in Romania.

Zavloschi was born as the daughter of farmers, educated herself to be a teacher, was active as such and married a colleague. In 1930, she was asked to run in the election as mayor by the farmers of the community opposite her very unpopular predecessor, and accepted. She was elected to serve two terms and her tenure was successful: she is credited with establishing a new community register and introducing phones to the then very neglected and isolated area.
