= Cantonal Council of Schwyz =

Legislature of the Canton of Schwyz, Switzerland

Cantonal Council of Schwyz Schwyzer Kantonsrat

Type
- Type: Unicameral

Leadership
- President: Jonathan Prelicz (SP)
- Vice President: Max Helbling (SVP)

Structure
- Seats: 100
- Political groups: SVP (38) The Centre (23) FDP (19) SP (12) GLP (5) Greens (2) Independent (1)
- Length of term: 4 years

Elections
- Last election: 3 March 2024
- Next election: 2028

Meeting place
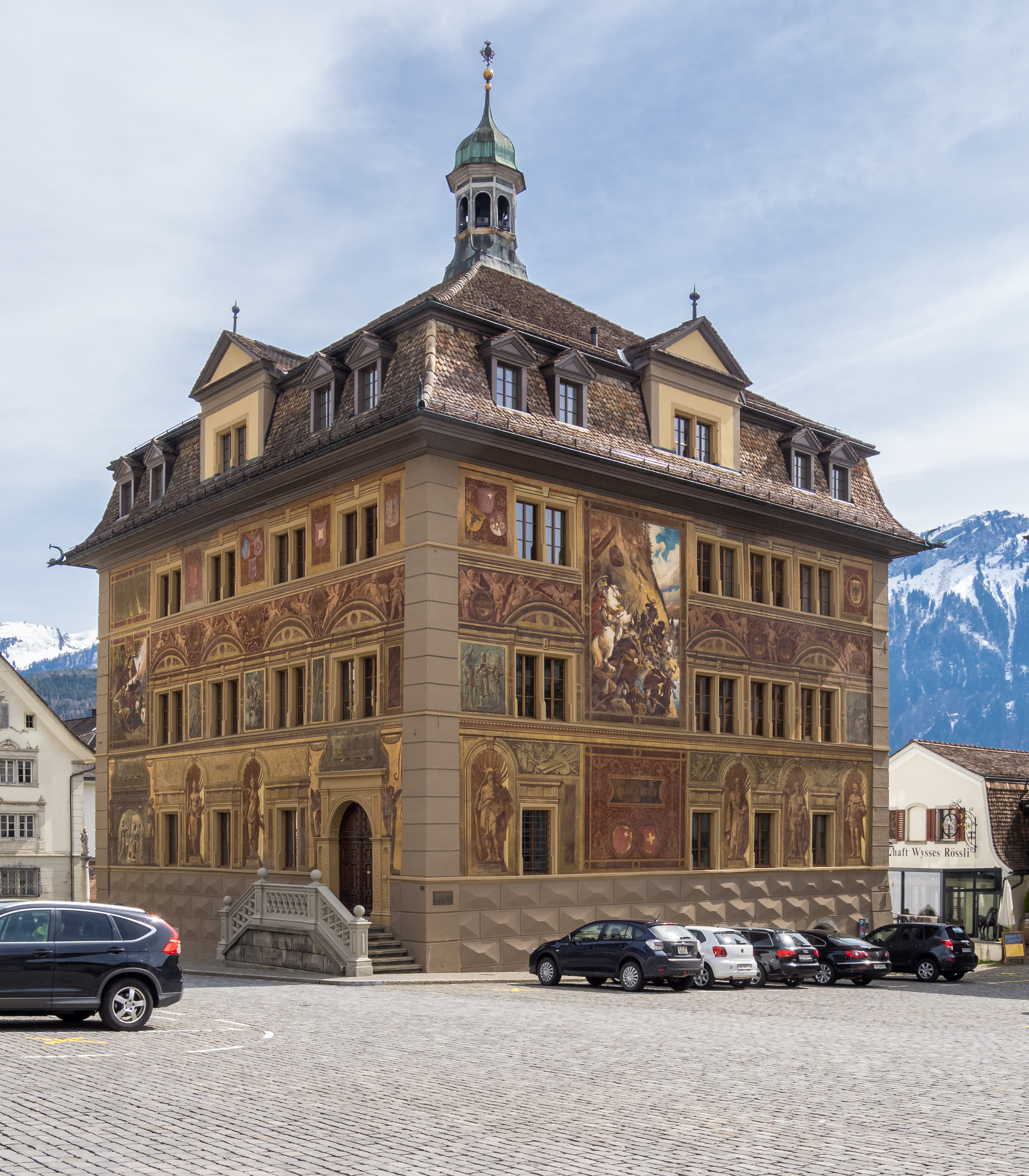
- Rathaus

Website
- Official website

Cantonal Council of Schwyz (German: Schwyzer Kantonsrat) is the legislature of the Canton of Schwyz in Switzerland. Schwyz has a unicameral legislature. The Cantonal Council has 100 seats which are elected every four years in a proportional election.
