= 2014 Belgrade City Assembly election =

Local election in Serbia

- 16 March 2014
- All 110 seats in the City Assembly; 55 seats needed for a majority
- Turnout: 50.66%
| Party | Leader | Vote % | Seats | +/– |
|---|---|---|---|---|
| SNS coalition | Zorana Mihajlović | 43.62 | 63 | +26 |
| DS coalition | Dragan Đilas | 15.70 | 22 | −28 |
| SPS–PUPS–JS | Aleksandar Antić | 11.49 | 16 | +3 |
| DSS | Aleksandar Popović | 6.39 | 9 | −1 |
This lists parties that won seats. See the complete results below.
| Mayor of Belgrade before | Mayor of Belgrade after |
|---|---|
| Siniša Mali (Acting); Independent | Siniša Mali; SNS |

The local election for the City Assembly of Belgrade, capital of Serbia, was held on 16 March 2014, alongside parliamentary election. The election was scheduled in late 2013, after the mayor Dragan Đilas lost a non-confidence motion in the assembly. Twenty-three parties and coalitions ran for 110 seats in the Assembly, with 5% election threshold required to win seats.

According to the final results, parliamentary winner Serbian Progressive Party also won 43.62% votes in Belgrade, and an absolute majority of 63 seats. Only three more lists surpassed the threshold: Democratic Party of Dragan Đilas with 15.7% of votes (22 seats), Socialist Party of Serbia with partners took 11.49% (16 seats) and Democratic Party of Serbia won 6.39% (9 seats).

== Background ==
The aftermath of the 2012 elections was radical; then's incumbent president Boris Tadić lost to the oppositions counter-opponent Tomislav Nikolić. This effectively led to a change of the ruling majority with the Progressives ousting and replacing the Democrats (see for more detail: Cabinet of Ivica Dačić). The result of the local elections, however, were considerably in favor of the Democrats and it was easy enough for mayor Dragan Đilas to secure a second term with a coalition of his coalition (DS along with its minor partners, the Social Democratic Party of Serbia and the Serbian Renewal Movement) with the SPS-PUPS-JS, lacking but a single vote for a majority. Over the following months there were some serious changes within the DS, with early party elections and Tadic's stepping down from the race acceding defeat and settling with an honorary presidential title, and Djilas becoming party leader; it was quickly followed by significant party-purges of those that took part in the 2008–2012 government due to political responsibility.

Subsequent changes as a result were a swift decline of the DS in the opinion polls (including withdrawal from politics of a significant number of individuals, as well as a fraction breaking off and forming a new political party under the leadership of former minister Dušan Petrović called Together for Serbia) and SNS' plummeting. It led to after restructuring the government only PUPS remaining in support of Đilas by late 2013, with more and more pressure for an early election in Belgrade. In the end he was outvoted in late September 2013 and the government named a provisional team to administer the capital city until early elections, headed by acting mayor Siniša Mali who is closely associated with the SNS. Many parties and individuals participated in the provisional local government, but the DS withdrew from it early on; the long-lasting enforced government was perceived by the Democrats as a tyrannical act aimed at weakening their position and strengthening the Progressives' chances. As per the constitution and according laws, elections for Belgrade were finally scheduled in early 2014 for 16 March 2014.

This led to a chain of results with the Progressives deciding to go on early parliamentary elections simultaneously, bringing down Ivica Dačić's government.

== Electoral lists ==
The following are the electoral lists in the capital city so far proclaimed by the City Electoral Commission:

| Ballot number | Ballot name | Ballot carrier | Note |
|---|---|---|---|
| 1 | Aleksandar Vučić — Future we believe in (SNS, SDPS, NS, SPO, PS) | Zorana Mihajlović-Milanović | |
| 2 | Ivica Dačić — SPS, PUPS, JS — Milan Krkobabić | Aleksandar Antić | |
| 3 | Democratic Party of Serbia - Vojislav Koštunica | Aleksandar Popović | |
| 4 | Čedomir Jovanović — Liberal Democratic Party | Željko Ožegović | |
| 5 | Serbian Radical Party - Dr Vojislav Šešelj | Vojislav Šešelj | |
| 6 | United Regions of Serbia — Mlađan Dinkič | Mlađan Dinkić | |
| 7 | Cyrillic for Belgrade — Civic Group | Marko Mandić | |
| 8 | With the Democratic Party for a democratic Belgrade - Dragan Đilas | Dragan Đilas | |
| 9 | Democracy — Europe — Serbia | Dr Milorad Paunović | |
| 10 | Third Serbia — For all the hard-working people | Aleksandar Protić | |
| 11 | Boris Tadić — New Democratic Party — Greens — Together for Serbia | Boris Ranković | |
| 12 | Dveri — Vladan Glišić | Vladan Glišić | |
| 13 | Civic group “Patriotic Front” — Dr Borislav Pelević | Milica Đurđević | |
| 14 | Alliance of Vojvodina Hungarians — István Pásztor | Nebojša Marjanović | ^{M} |
| 15 | GEPS for Belgrade — Prof. Dr Jovan Filipović | Prof. Dr Jovan Filipović | |
| 16 | Party of Russians of Serbia — Dragan Cvetković | Dragan Cvetković | ^{M} |
| 17 | Civic group “Economic movement” - Branko Dragaš | Predrag Mitrović | |
| 18 | Civic group “It is the same” - Igor Brakus | Igor Brakus | |
| 19 | Patriotism in parliament — 1389 — Miša Vacić | Stefan Janković | |
| 20 | Civic group “Free Serbia” — Academic dr Jovan Deretić | Jovan I. Deretić | |
| 21 | It's enough — Saša Radulović | Saša Radulović | |
| 22 | None of the Above | Nikola Tulimirović | ^{M} |
| 23 | Blank ballots | Saša Damljanović | |

^{M} — National minority list

== Campaign ==
All lists endorse the forthcoming Pride parade in Belgrade, except for the DSS.

The Representative Organizations of the Disabled Persons of Belgrade had signed a Protocol with the DS.

== Opinion polls ==
According to Factor Plus, 20–26 January:

- SNS: 37.4%
- DS: 22.8%
- SPS: 9.1%
- DSS: 7.4%

Below threshold:

- LDP: 4.8%
- URS: 2.6%

According to a poll of the "Nina Media" research agency and TV Prva conducted after elections were scheduled in early 2014:

- SNS: 40.8%
- DS: 21.3%
- SPS: 9.9%
- DSS: 8.4%

Other parties are below the electoral threshold.

According to 24–25 February Faktor plus poll:

- 42.5% SNS
- 17.4% DS
- 8.9% SPS-PUPS-JS
- 6.8% DSS
- 6.6% LDP
- 5.2% NDS

== Results ==
The following are the final results proclaimed by the City Electoral Commission:

| Party | Votes | % | Seats | +/– |
|---|---|---|---|---|
| SNS-SDPS-NS-SPO-PS coalition | 351,183 | 45.17 | 63 | +26 |
| DS-NS coalition | 126,429 | 16.26 | 22 | -28 |
| SPS–PUPS–JS coalition | 92,539 | 11.90 | 16 | +3 |
| Democratic Party of Serbia | 51,435 | 6.62 | 9 | -1 |
| Group of citizens - total | 43,250 | 5.56 | – | – |
| Dveri | 30,075 | 3.87 | – | – |
| NDS–Greens–ZZS coalition | 29,504 | 3.80 | – | – |
| LDP–SDU coalition | 25,762 | 3.31 | – | – |
| Serbian Radical Party | 16,250 | 2.09 | – | – |
| United Regions of Serbia | 9,391 | 1.21 | – | – |
| Party of Russians of Serbia | 845 | 0.11 | – | – |
| Alliance of Vojvodina Hungarians | 774 | 0.10 | – | – |
| Total | 777,437 | 100.00 | 110 | 110 |
| Valid votes | 777,437 | 96.65 | | |
| Invalid/blank votes | 26,936 | 3.35 | | |
| Total votes | 804,373 | 100.00 | | |
| Registered voters/turnout | 1,588,996 | 50.62 | | |
