= Tomislav Nikolić =

Serbian politician (born 1952)

- Томислав Николић
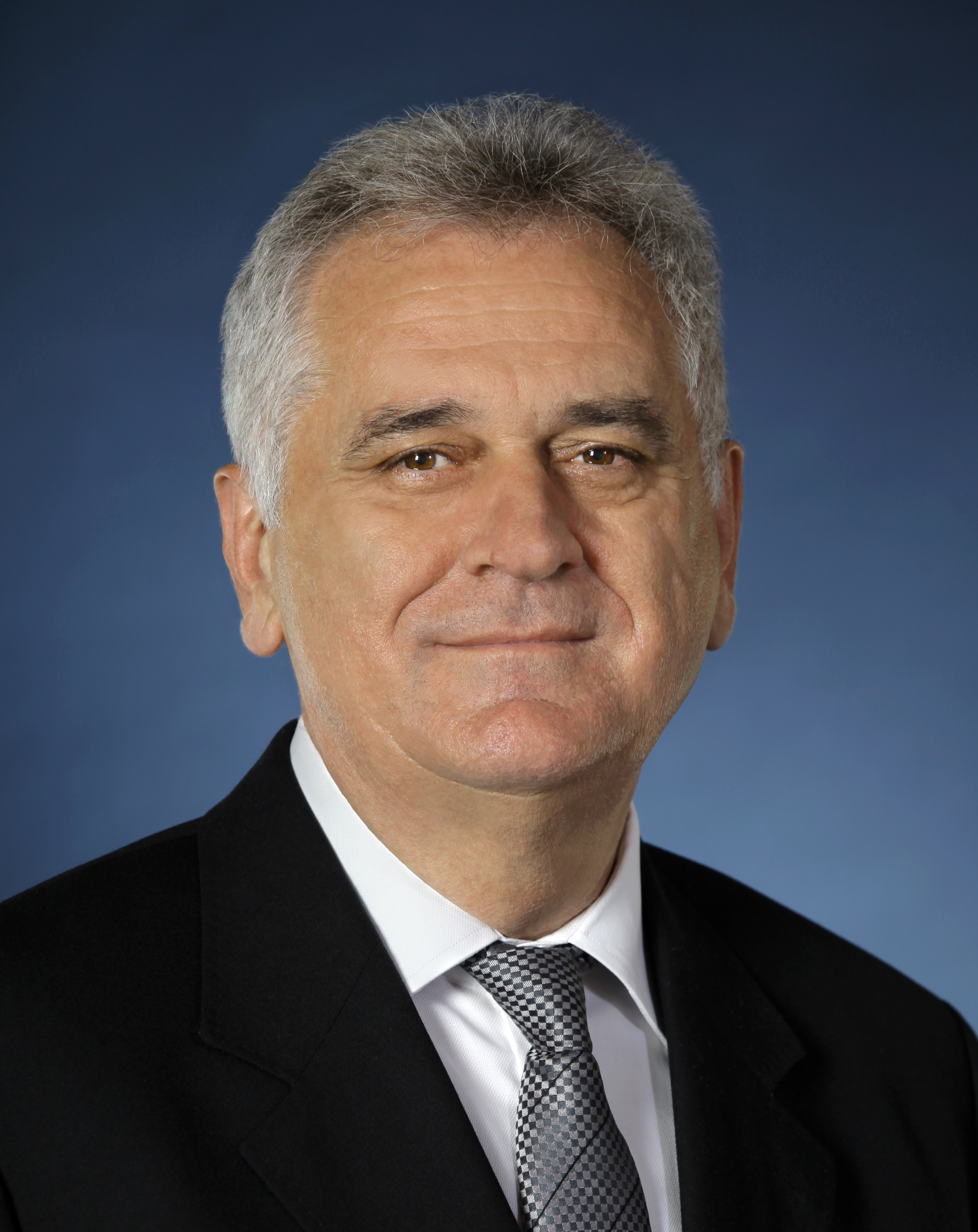
- Official portrait, 2012

President of Serbia
- In office 31 May 2012 – 31 May 2017
- Prime Minister: Mirko Cvetković; Ivica Dačić; Aleksandar Vučić
- Preceded by: Boris Tadić; Slavica Đukić Dejanović (acting)
- Succeeded by: Aleksandar Vučić

President of the Serbian Progressive Party
- In office 21 October 2008 – 24 May 2012
- Preceded by: Party established
- Succeeded by: Aleksandar Vučić

President of the National Assembly
- In office 8 May 2007 – 13 May 2007
- Preceded by: Predrag Marković; Borka Vučić (acting)
- Succeeded by: Milutin Mrkonjić (acting); Oliver Dulić

Deputy Prime Minister of FR Yugoslavia
- In office 12 August 1999 – 9 October 2000
- Prime Minister: Momir Bulatović
- Preceded by: Vuk Drašković
- Succeeded by: Miroljub Labus

Deputy Prime Minister of Serbia
- In office 24 March 1998 – 12 August 1999
- Prime Minister: Mirko Marjanović

Personal details
- Born: 15 February 1952 (age 74) Kragujevac, PR Serbia, FPR Yugoslavia
- Party: NRS (1990–1991); SRS (1991–2008); SNS (2008–present)
- Spouse: Dragica Ninković
- Children: 2, including Radomir
- Website: Official website
- Nickname: Toma

Tomislav Nikolić (Note: Serbian Cyrillic: Томислав Николић, pronounced [tǒmislaʋ nǐkolit͡ɕ]) (born 15 February 1952) is a Serbian politician who served as president of Serbia from 2012 to 2017. A former member of the far-right Serbian Radical Party (SRS), he disassociated himself from the party in 2008 and formed the Serbian Progressive Party (SNS) which he led until 2012.

Born in Bajčetina, a village near Kragujevac, Nikolić was a long-time member of parliament for SRS. He served as the Deputy Prime Minister of Serbia from 1998 to 1999 and Deputy Prime Minister of FR Yugoslavia in the coalition government from 1999 to 2000. Nikolić was the deputy leader of SRS from 2003, and he briefly served as the President of the National Assembly of Serbia in 2007. In 2008, he resigned following a disagreement with party leader Vojislav Šešelj regarding Serbia's relations with the European Union, as Nikolić became in favour of Serbia's accession to the EU, a move that was staunchly opposed by Šešelj and his faction. Nikolić formed SNS, which several SRS members joined.

Nikolić ran for President of Yugoslavia in the 2000 elections and placed third. He also ran four times for President of Serbia (in 2003, 2004, 2008, and 2012 elections). In 2003, he garnered the most votes, but the election was cancelled due to low turnout, while in 2004 and 2008 he was placed second behind Boris Tadić. In 2012, he won the run-off against Tadić to become President of Serbia.

== Early life ==
Tomislav Nikolić was born in Kragujevac. His father, Radomir, was a labourer, and his mother, Živadinka (née Đoković), was a housewife. In his youth, he trained in athletics. He completed secondary technical school in Kragujevac. His first employment was as a cemetery supervisor. In 1971 he began working with the building construction company "Žegrap", and in 1978 he worked for the company "22 December" in Kragujevac as head of the Investment and Maintenance Department. He was also the Technical Director of the Utility Services company in Kragujevac. He and his wife Dragica (née Ninković) have two sons.

== Political career ==
=== Serbian Radical Party ===
Nikolić began his political career as vice-president of the People's Radical Party. Under his initiative, a fraction of the People's Radical Party merged with Vojislav Šešelj's Serbian National Renewal to form the Serbian Radical Party. Šešelj was elected president of the new party and Nikolić as vice-president. The party had been described by some as a Chetnik party oriented towards neo-fascism and striving for the territorial expansion of Serbia. The Chetniks were a World War II movement in Yugoslavia led by Draža Mihailović. While it was anti-Axis in its long-term goals and engaged in resistance activities for limited periods, it also engaged in tactical or selective collaboration with Axis forces during the war. In 1993, during the Bosnian War, Nikolić was proclaimed as Chetnik voivode by Šešelj in a ceremony on the Romanija Mountain.

Nikolić has been a deputy in the National Assembly of Serbia since 1991, the only one elected continuously since that year. Under Slobodan Milošević and the Socialist Party of Serbia, he and Šešelj were sentenced to three months in prison which he served in Gnjilane. However, in March 1998, the Serbian Radical Party formed a coalition with the Socialist Party and he then became the vice-president of the Government of Serbia and, by the end of 1999, the vice-president of the government of the Federal Republic of Yugoslavia.

In 2000, he began the first of several runs for the presidency of Serbia. In the FR Yugoslavia presidential election of 2000, he finished in third place behind Vojislav Koštunica and Slobodan Milošević. He then ran in the 2003 Serbian presidential election, in which garnered the most votes in the first round (46.23%), ahead of Dragoljub Mićunović, but the results were invalidated due to a low turnout of only 38.8%. Nikolić made yet another bid for the presidency in the 2004 presidential election. In the first round, he received 30.1% of the vote and Boris Tadić received 27.3%. In the second round held on 27 June, Nikolić lost to Tadić by 53.7% to 45.4%. On 23 February 2003, he became the party's deputy leader after Vojislav Šešelj went voluntarily to the ICTY. During his leadership of the party, Nikolić favoured pushing the party towards focusing on more economic and social issues such as poverty and unemployment, rather than militant nationalism.

In a remark about Serbian Prime Minister Zoran Đinđić's injured leg, Nikolić said on 28 February 2003: "If anyone of you, in the following month or two, sees Zoran Đinđić somewhere, tell him that Tito also had a problem with a leg before his death". Less than two weeks later Đinđić was assassinated in Belgrade. Nikolić later apologised for his statement by saying that he would have never said that had he known what would happen. In contrast to Đinđić, Nikolić repeatedly refused to apologise for stating "I don't regret that Slavko Ćuruvija was murdered". (The journalist Slavko Ćuruvija was murdered on 11 April 1999 in front of the door of his building.)

Nikolić was elected Speaker of Parliament on 8 May 2007, defeating Milena Milošević of the Democratic Party by 142 to 99 votes out of 244 members of Parliament. The Democratic Party of Serbia endorsed him. Hajredin Kuçi of the Democratic Party of Kosovo, Ylli Hoxha of the Reformist Party ORA, and the Prime Minister of Kosovo Agim Çeku condemned the election of Nikolić as "counterproductive and dangerous for Kosovo". On 9 May, Nikolić met with Russian Ambassador Aleksandr Alekseyev and gave a speech to Parliament in which he advocated making Serbia part of a Belarus-Russia superstate, saying that together they would "stand up against the hegemony of America and the European Union".

He resigned from his position as speaker on 13 May after the Democratic Party and the Democratic Party of Serbia formed a preliminary alliance in preparation for a coalition government. Nikolić told the Democratic parties that if they "peacefully accept" the independence of Kosovo, the Radical Party "will not sit calmly and wait".

In 2008, he ran again for the presidency in the 2008 presidential election. His slogan was With All Heart (Serbian: Свим срцем; Svim srcem). On 20 January 2008, Nikolić again won the first round with 39.99% of the vote. Nikolić and incumbent Boris Tadić, who garnered 35.39% of the vote, faced off against each other in a runoff election on 3 February. Nikolić lost, receiving 2,197,155 or 47.97% of the vote.

Nikolić abruptly resigned from the Radical Party leadership on 6 September 2008. Serb media cited differences between Nikolić and other members of the Radical Party hierarchy, especially party leader Vojislav Šešelj, about how the party should react to the proposed European Union membership for Serbia. In the following days, Nikolić formed a parliamentary group with a number of other Radical Party representatives called "Napred Srbijo" (Forward, Serbia). Nikolić told the press that the "old Serbian Radical Party no longer exists". On 11 September 2008, Šešelj addressed all Radical Party members in a letter. He named Nikolić and his group as "traitors, Western puppets and agents". He also called upon all SRS members to remain loyal to the ideology of "Serbian nationalism, anti-globalism and pro-Russian politics". On 12 September 2008, Nikolić and his group were officially ejected from the Radical Party. Nikolić announced that he would form his own party.

=== Serbian Progressive Party ===
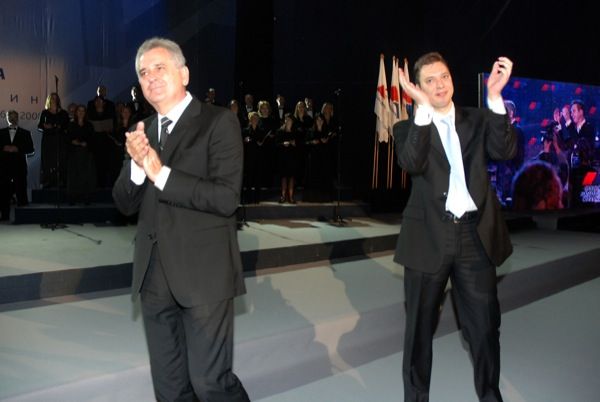
Former President of the National Assembly Tomislav Nikolić and former Minister of Information of Serbia Aleksandar Vučić at the founding convention of SNS, c. 2008–09

On 24 September 2008, Nikolić announced that his new party's name would be the Serbian Progressive Party and that the first convention would be held on 21 October. The founding congress of the new party was held on 21 October 2008.

On 5 February 2011, in front of the National Assembly, Nikolić and his political supporters – Milanka Karić (Strength of Serbia Movement), Velimir Ilić (New Serbia), Aleksandar Vulin (Movement of Socialists) and Aleksandar Vučić organised a protest demanding early parliamentary elections. According to an official Serbian police report there were around 55,000 people present. On 16 April 2011, Nikolić organised a larger protest with the same request. He also started a thirst and hunger strike that morning and later moved to the national parliament. He stated that his goal was to force the then-Serbian government (led by Boris Tadić) to hold early parliamentary elections. On 17 April, Tadić came to visit Nikolić in the latter's parliamentary chambers. Tadić advised Nikolić to stop striking. Nikolić's condition worsened, and he was taken to a private hospital. Serbia's media regularly reported on his condition. That same night his arterial tension was high (150/100 mmHg) but he refused to seek intravenous therapy or medication. When he realised that his hunger strike would not bring about the desired outcome, Nikolić stepped down, citing Easter.

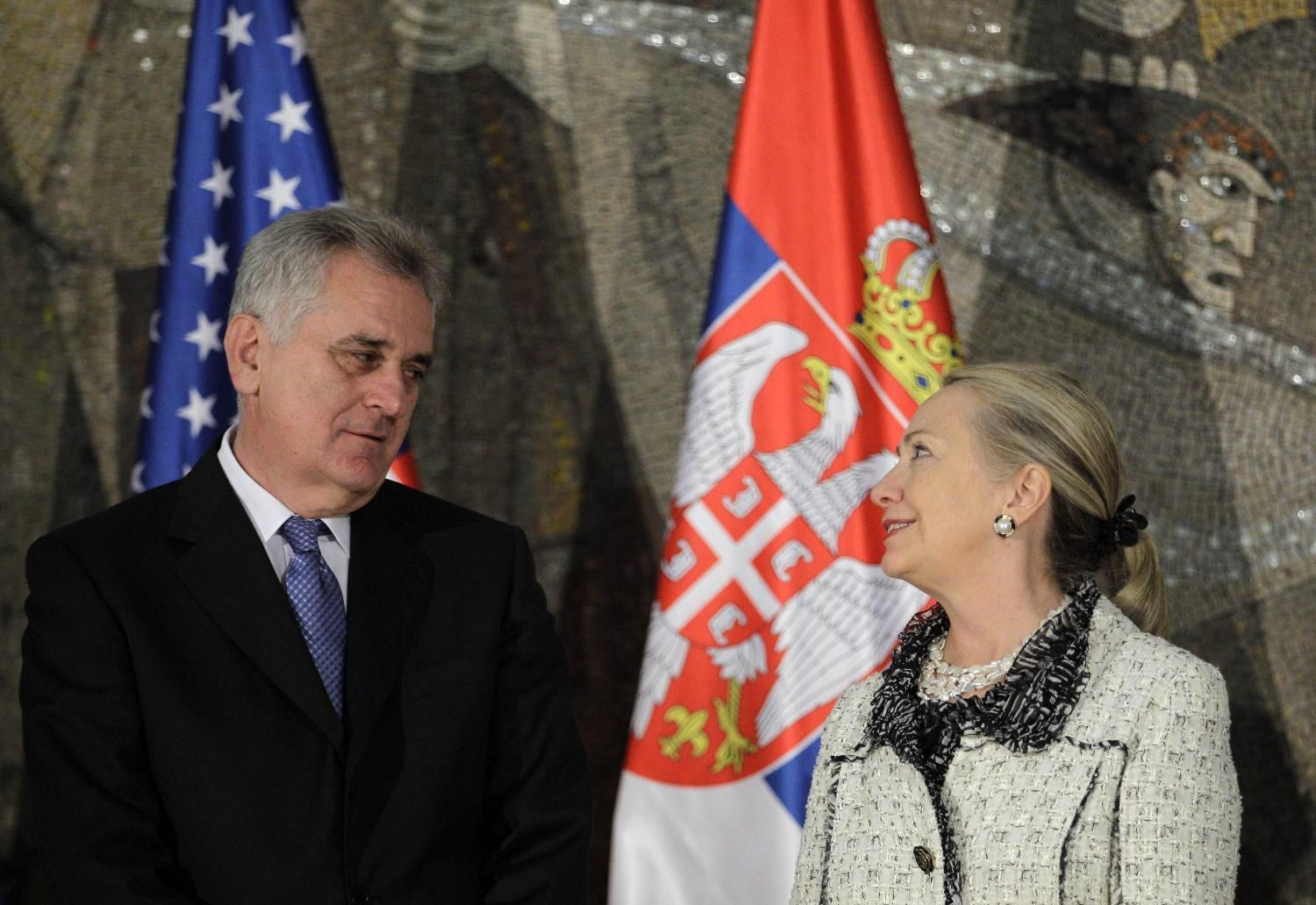
Nikolić with U.S. Secretary of State Hillary Clinton at the Palace of Serbia in Belgrade, 30 October 2012.

Nikolić led the party in the 2012 parliamentary election, and he ran for president in the 2012 presidential election. His slogan was Let's Get Serbia Moving (Serbian: Покренимо Србију, Pokrenimo Srbiju). During the campaign, the issue of his education was raised, as the opposition claimed that Nikolić obtained his master's degree under dubious circumstances in a private school. Nikolić responded by suing the daily newspapers Blic and Kurir, demanding 4 million euros as compensation.

On 6 May 2012, Nikolić lost the first round with 25.05% of the vote. Nikolić and incumbent Boris Tadić, who garnered 25.31% of the vote, faced off against each other in a runoff election on 20 May. Nikolić won, receiving 49.4% of the vote in a tally of 70% of the polling stations. Boris Tadić, his rival in the elections, congratulated him on the victory, and stated that he hoped that Serbia would continue its progress under Nikolić.

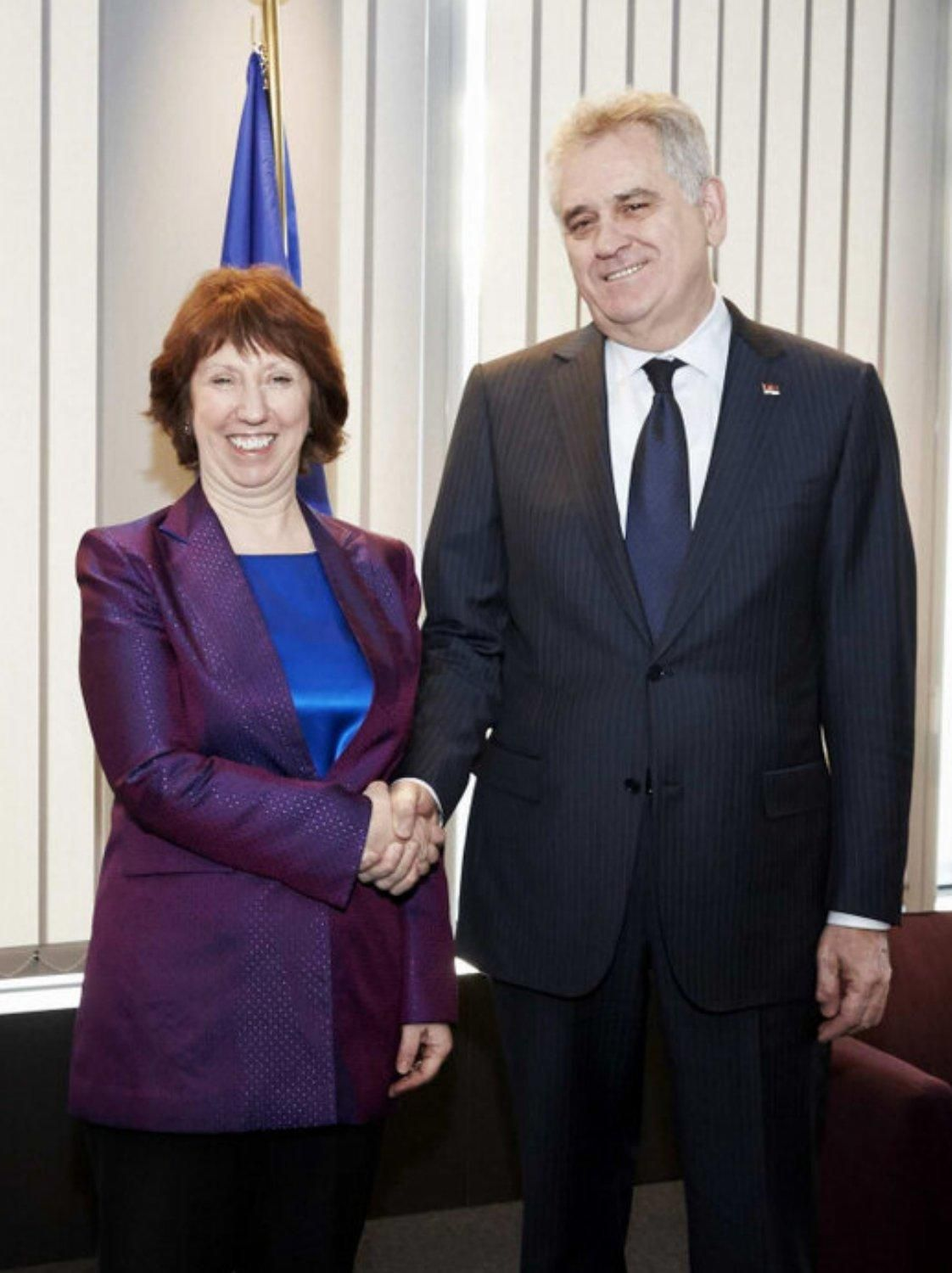
Nikolić with High Representative of the European Union for Foreign Affairs and Security Policy Catherine Ashton at in Brussels, 7 February 2013.

Nikolić resigned as leader of the Serbian Progressive Party on 24 May 2012, and simultaneously quit his membership in the party, citing the desire to be a president of all citizens of Serbia.

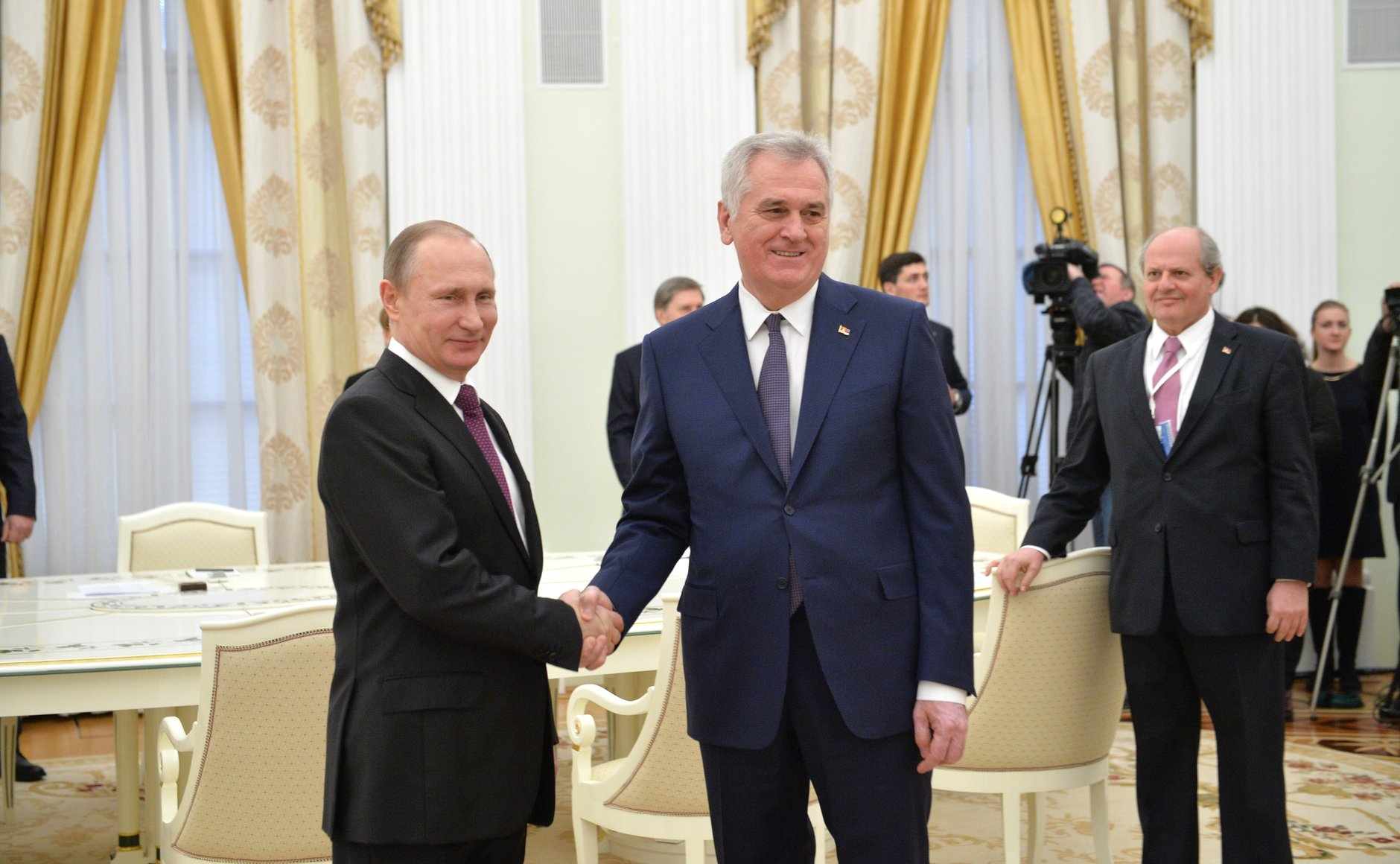
Nikolić meeting Russian President Vladimir Putin in Moscow, 10 March 2016.

In a May 2012 interview, Nikolić was quoted by Frankfurter Allgemeine Zeitung to have said that ″Vukovar was a Serb city and Croats have nothing to go back to there″. Croatian President Ivo Josipović criticised Nikolić for this statement and conditioned future cooperation on Nikolić's withdrawal of the statement.

The following day Nikolić's office issued a statement saying that Nikolić never made any such statement and called it a ″treacherous lie″. However, Michael Martens, a journalist at Frankfurter Allgemeine Zeitung subsequently published the audio recording showing that Nikolić had indeed made that statement.

In late September 2013, the Belgrade pride parade was banned by the Serbian police for the third consecutive year following violent threats issued by right-wing groups and requests by the Serbian Orthodox Church. Prior to the parade, Dačić released a statement in which he said that homosexual behaviour was "abnormal" and that homosexuals in Serbia needed to "respect the wishes of the majority of the population" if the "majority's wish was for the parade to not take place." Nikolić subsequently issued a statement calling for "work on the organisation of next year's parade to begin immediately."

== Presidency (2012–2017) ==
Nikolić was inaugurated as the President of Serbia on 31 May 2012. Štefan Füle, the European Commissioner for Neighbourhood and Enlargement, was the highest-ranking official to attend and many ambassadors from other countries were also present. The leaders of Croatia, Bosnia and Herzegovina, Slovenia and Macedonia, boycotted the inauguration due to his denial of the genocide in Srebrenica and claims about Vukovar. Nikolić's advisors were Marko Đurić, Stanislava Pak, Oliver Antić, Milorad Simić, Radoslav Pavlović, Predrag Mikić and Jasmina Mitrović Marić.

On 2 June 2012, Nikolić stated on Montenegrin television that "there was no genocide in Srebrenica. In Srebrenica, grave war crimes were committed by some Serbs who should be found, prosecuted and punished. [...] It is very difficult to indict someone and prove before a court that an event qualifies as genocide." Nikolić stated that he would not attend the annual commemoration of the Srebrenica massacre: "Don't always ask the Serbian president if he is going to Srebrenica, my predecessor was there and paid tribute. Why should every president do the same?" His predecessor, Tadić, had previously acknowledged the massacre as a genocide.

Bakir Izetbegović, a member of Bosnia and Herzegovina's presidency, said Nikolić's comments insulted the survivors. He elaborated "the denial of genocide in Srebrenica will not pave the way for co-operation and reconciliation in the region, but on the contrary, may cause fresh misunderstandings and tensions." Catherine Ashton, High Representative of the Union for Foreign Affairs and Security Policy, condemned his comments and stated that "the EU strongly rejects any intention to rewrite history." The United States Department of State deplored Nikolić's statement and considered them unfounded and counterproductive.

On 25 April 2013, Nikolić apologised for crimes committed by any individual in the name of Serbia, and, in particular, for crimes committed in Srebrenica. The apology was not well received by some media and politicians in Bosnia and Herzegovina who were disappointed that Nikolić did not recognise the massacre as a genocide.

As President, Nikolić has decorated a large number of domestic and foreign individuals and institutions on the occasion of Statehood Day. In 2016, he honoured Omar al-Bashir, President of Sudan, because that country refused to recognise Kosovo's independence. The New York-based Coalition for the International Criminal Court called on Nikolić to revoke the medal he gave to Sudan's president because Bashir is wanted by the International Criminal Court (ICC) and is suspected of five counts of crimes against humanity, two counts of war crimes and three counts of genocide allegedly committed in Darfur.

In February 2017, Nikolić announced that he would not seek re-election in Serbia's forthcoming elections and extended his support to Aleksandar Vučić.

== Controversies ==
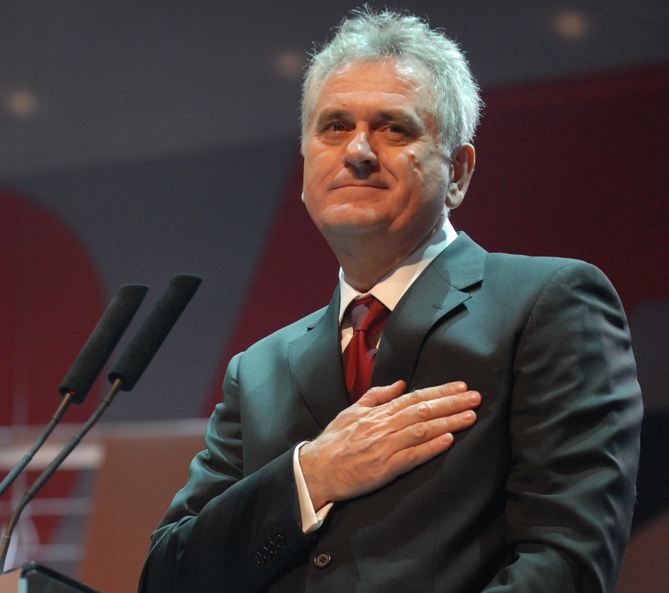
Nikolić giving a speech in 2008.

=== Greater Serbia ===
During the 1990s and until 2008, Nikolić repeatedly called for the creation of a Greater Serbia. Nikolić told Večernje novosti in 2004 that the boundaries of Greater Serbia along the Virovitica-Karlovac-Karlobag line were not part of any imperialistic politics, but would always remain a "dream" for him and other Radical leaders. He also said that he would not have diplomatic relations with Croatia because they are "occupying Serbian land". In 2007, Nikolić stated that the basis of political action in the Serbian Radical Party was the unification of Republika Srpska, Montenegro, and the Republic of Serbian Krajina with Serbia in a single Balkan state. But a few days before the 2012 elections, Nikolić told the Frankfurter Allgemeine Zeitung in an interview that the territorial integrity of neighbouring countries cannot be questioned and that his former opinions were no longer valid. When asked about this change of position, he quoted a French philosopher that said "only a fool does not change his opinion." In 2018, Nikolić stated that he has supported the independence of Republika Srpska and unification with Serbia.

=== Education ===
In 2012, Nikolić was accused of buying a master's degree from the Faculty of Management in Novi Sad without attending a single class or exam. The allegation was based on the fact that his diploma had no stamp and that no other students recalled having seen him attend classes or exams.

=== Comments about the protection of "Serbian genes" ===
On 25 January 2016, Nikolić laid the cornerstone for "the Centre of Excellence" of the University of Kragujevac, his hometown; the institution will include a stem cell research unit. Nikolić said The Stem Cell Bank will "preserve what's most important, and the most beautiful characteristics of the Serb people" and also: "Children should be born here, with the Serb genetic material, with the Serb code, Serb past and Serb future. That has guided me to support this". Ombudsman of Serbia, Saša Janković, reacted to this on Twitter by saying he "regretted this statement," and adding that the first article of the Constitution states "the Republic of Serbia is the state of the Serb people and all citizens who live in it." The League of Social Democrats of Vojvodina (LSV) also reacted, saying that the president made "a Nazi statement" that "violated the Constitution," and urged him to resign.

=== Comments about gynaecology and women ===
In September 2016, At the opening ceremony of the Symposium of the Association of Gynaecologists and Obstetricians Serbia, Montenegro and Republika Srpska, Nikolić said: "Gynaecology is knowledge about women, if anyone should dare to say that they have that knowledge". Maja Sedlarević, member of League of Social Democrats of Vojvodina (LSV), said Nikolić had offended women and also he is ignorant, uneducated and superficial.

== Bibliography ==
Nikolić has published thirteen books:

- Ни победа ни пораз – Neither victory nor defeat
- Све за Косово и Метохију – Everything for Kosovo and Metohija
- Отета победа – Abducted victory
- Шешеља за председника – Šešelj for President
- Кроз медијски мрак – Through the darkness of the media
- Писмо са адресом – The letter with an address
- У канџама мржње – In the grip of hatred
- Говорио сам – I spoke
- Скупштински ход по мукама – The parliamentary walk on torture
- Неокомунистички парламент – Neo-communist parliament
- Од почетка – Since the beginning
- Кад падне влада Милошевић пада – When the government falls, Milošević falls
- Ровови у Народној скупштини – The Trenches in the National Assembly

== Honours and awards ==
Award or decoration	Country	Date	Place
Order of Makarios III	Cyprus	13 January 2013	Belgrade
Order of Merit	Ukraine	6 June 2013	Belgrade
Order of the Redeemer	Greece	18 June 2013	Belgrade
Order of Glory	Armenia	11 October 2014	Yerevan
Order of José Martí	Cuba	19 May 2015	Havana
National Order of Merit	Algeria	17 May 2016	Algiers
Order of Friendship	Kazakhstan	24 August 2016	Belgrade
Order of Prince Henry	Portugal	25 January 2017	Lisbon
Order of the Friendship of the Peoples	Belarus	20 May 2017	Minsk
Order of Friendship	Russia	30 May 2017	Moscow
Order of the Republika Srpska	Bosnia and Herzegovina: Republika Srpska	9 January 2018	Banja Luka

=== Honorary citizenship ===
Country	City	Year
Serbia	Honorary citizen of Čačak	2013
Bosnia and Herzegovina (Republika Srpska)	Honorary citizen of Trebinje	2013
Montenegro	Honorary citizen of Berane	2015
China	Honorary citizen of Beijing	2017

Party political offices
New political party	Leader of the People's Radical Party; 1990–1991	Succeeded by Veljko Guberina
New political party	Deputy President of the Radical Party; 2003–2008	Succeeded by Dragan Todorović
New political party	Leader of the Serbian Progressive Party; 2008–2012	Succeeded by Aleksandar Vučić
Political offices
Preceded by Predrag Marković	President of the National Assembly; 2007	Succeeded by Oliver Dulić
Preceded by Slavica Đukić Dejanović; Acting	President of Serbia; 2012–2017	Succeeded by Aleksandar Vučić
