= Goran Pekarski =

Serbian politician

Goran Pekarski (Serbian Cyrillic: Горан Пекарски; born 28 February 1965) is a Serbian politician. He has served in the National Assembly of Serbia since 2016, originally as a member of New Serbia and subsequently with the Serbian Progressive Party.

== Early life and career ==
Pekarski was born in Belgrade, in what was then the Socialist Republic of Serbia in the Socialist Federal Republic of Yugoslavia. He is an economist. In a 2011 interview, he indicated that he fought in the 1991–95 war between Serbia and Croatia and was wounded in action in 1992.

== Political career ==
Pekarski joined the Democratic Party (Demokratska stranka, DS) in 1996 and became the party's leader in the Kaluđerica neighbourhood of Belgrade's Grocka municipality. He left the party in December 2000, frustrated with what he described as its lack of focus, and joined the Democratic Alternative (Demokratska Аlternativa, DA) the following year. He appeared on the DA's electoral list for the 2003 Serbian parliamentary election; the list did not cross the threshold required to win representation in the national assembly. (From 2000 to 2011, electoral mandates were awarded to parties or coalitions rather than to individual candidates, and it was common practice for the mandates to be assigned out of numerical order. Pekarski's list position had no direct bearing on whether or not he received a mandate.)

The DA merged into the Social Democratic Party in 2004. Pekarsi did not join this party but instead helped to found an independent group called "Power of Citizens." He appeared in the second position on its list for the Grocka municipal assembly in the 2004 Serbian local elections. and was included in its assembly delegation when the list won three mandates. He again received the second position on the "Power of Citizens" list in the 2008 local elections and was selected for a second term in the assembly when the list won four mandates. During the 2008–12 term, he served as president (i.e., speaker) of the assembly.

Serbia's electoral law was reformed in 2011, such that mandates were awarded in numerical order to candidates on successful lists. For the 2012 local elections, "Power of Citizens" joined an electoral alliance led by the Socialist Party of Serbia. Pekarski appeared in the first position on the alliance's list in Grocka and was re-elected when the list won eight seats. He also received the 102nd position on the Socialist Party's coalition list for the City Assembly of Belgrade; the list won thirteen mandates, and he was not elected.

Pekarski subsequently joined New Serbia. He appeared in the sixth position on the party's list for Grocka in the 2016 Serbian local elections and was not re-elected when the list won two mandates.

=== Parliamentarian ===
New Serbia contested the 2016 Serbian parliamentary election in an alliance with the Progressive Party, and Pekarski was given the 248th position out of 250 on the latter's electoral list. This was too low a position for direct election to be a realistic prospect, and he was not initially elected despite the list winning a majority with 131 out of 250 seats. He was, however, awarded a mandate on 9 December 2016 as a replacement for fellow party member Velimir Stanojević, who had resigned to take a government position.

New Serbia initially supported Serbia's Progressive-led coalition government after the 2016 election. This arrangement came to an end in January 2017 when party leader Velimir Ilić broke with prime minister Aleksandar Vučić. Ilić's decision to leave the government led to a split in New Serbia, with three of its five assembly members leaving the party and continuing to support Vučić's administration. The other two, Pekarksi and Miroslav Markićević, remained with the party and moved into opposition, joining with four other parliamentarians to create a new assembly group called New Serbia–Movement For Serbia’s Salvation. For Pekarski, the move was temporary; he left New Serbia on 17 October 2017 and became a member of the Progressive Party.

During the 2016–20 parliament, Pekarski was a member of the assembly's security services control committee, a deputy member of the European Union–Serbia stabilization and association committee, and a member of the parliamentary friendship groups with Greece and Ghana.

Pekarski received the 146th position on the Progressive Party's Aleksandar Vučić — For Our Children list in the 2020 Serbian parliamentary election and was elected to a second term in the assembly when the list won a landslide majority with 188 mandates. He is now a member of the security services control committee and the committee on spatial planning, transport, infrastructure, and telecommunications, and a member of Serbia's parliamentary friendship groups with China, Greece, Russia, and the United States of America.
