= Miroslav Markićević =

Serbian politician

Miroslav Markićević (Serbian Cyrillic: Мирослав Маркићевић; born March 18, 1958) is a politician in Serbia. He served in the National Assembly of Serbia from 2001 to 2020 as a member of New Serbia.

== Early life and career ==
Markićević was born in Čačak, then part of the People's Republic of Serbia in the Federal People's Republic of Yugoslavia. He is a mechanical technician in private life and worked for many years at the Vinča Nuclear Institute in Belgrade before returning to his hometown.

== Political career ==
Markićević joined the Serbian Renewal Movement (Srpski pokret obnove, SPO) in Čačak in 1990, after multi-party democracy was re-introduced in Yugoslavia. Like many in the party, he opposed the Serbian government's military policies in the Yugoslav Wars of the 1990s. When the SPO experienced a split in 1998, Markićević joined the breakaway New Serbia party, became president of its executive committee in Čačak, and emerged as a prominent local opponent of Yugoslav president Slobodan Milošević's administration.

During the Kosovo War, Markićević helped organize a "citizen's assembly" in Čačak; this group issued a press release that outlined the crimes of Serbian police in Kosovo and Metohija. He later helped organize a major rally against Milošević following the war's conclusion. In June 2000, he served as co-ordinator of the "Alliance for Change," which united several opposition parties to contest upcoming local elections in Čačak as a single electoral list.

=== Member of the National Assembly ===
New Serbia contested the 2000 Serbian parliamentary election as part of the Democratic Opposition of Serbia, a broad alliance that included several opposition parties. Markićević received the 108th position on the coalition's electoral list and was selected as part of New Serbia's delegation to the assembly after the list won a landslide majority with 176 out of 250 mandates. (From 2000 to 2011, Serbian parliamentary mandates were awarded to sponsoring parties or coalitions rather than to individual candidates, and it was common practice for mandates to be awarded out of numerical order. While Markićević did not automatically receive a mandate by virtue of his position on the list, he was in fact chosen to serve and took his seat when the parliament met in 2001.) New Serbia was part of the Serbia's new government until 2002, when it crossed over to the opposition.

New Serbia ran in an alliance with the Serbian Renewal Movement in the 2003 parliamentary election. Markićević received the twenty-first position on the combined list and was again selected to serve in the assembly after the list won twenty-two mandates. After this election, New Serbia joined a new administration led by Vojislav Koštunica and Markićević again served as a supporter of the administration.

In 2006, when Montenegro seceded from the country Serbia and Montenegro following a referendum, Markićević argued that the people of the Republika Srpska should have a similar right to determine their status via a popular vote. He was quoted as saying, "I heard a few days ago that [Republika Srpska prime minister Milorad Dodik] had unofficially proposed to the EU high representative for foreign affairs and security, a threshold of 90 per cent for the independence of the Serb Republic. This is when we come to the question of the international community and its justice. If someone gets to choose their state with 55 per cent [Montenegro's threshold], why deny others to make that decision with 90 per cent?"

For the 2007 parliamentary election, New Serbia ran in an alliance with the Democratic Party of Serbia (Demokratska stranka Srbije, DSS), and the combined list won forty-seven mandates. Markićević received the thirty-fourth position on the alliance's list and was again selected to serve in its assembly delegation. He was the chair of New Serbia's executive committee during this time and represented the party in talks with Serbian president Boris Tadić on the appointment of a new prime minister following the election. Koštunica was ultimately appointed to a new term as prime minister, and New Serbia remained part of the government. When the assembly convened, Markićević served as deputy leader of the Democratic Party of Serbia–New Serbia parliamentary group.

A media report in 2007 described Markićević as one of two New Serbia representatives considered as best positioned to succeed party leader Velimir Ilić, were Ilić to resign his position.

New Serbia continued its alliance with the Democratic Party of Serbia into the 2008 parliamentary election. Markićević received the thirtieth position on the combined list, the list won exactly thirty mandates, and he was again chosen as part of New Serbia's delegation. A new administration was ultimately formed under the leadership of the rival Democratic Party (Demokratska stranka, DS) following the election, and New Serbia again moved into opposition. Markićević served as the party's deputy leader in the next sitting of the assembly and was a member of the parliamentary security committee.

Markićević strongly opposed Montenegro's recognition of the independence of Kosovo in 2008, describing the decision as "worse than if the entire world had recognised Kosovo"; he later opposed a suggestion by Milorad Dodik that Kosovo could be partitioned. He also spoke against the planned participation of Serbian officers in North Atlantic Treaty Organization (NATO) exercises in Georgia that were opposed by Russia, saying it made no sense for Serbia to involve itself in a "tug-of-war" between the NATO and Russia.

Serbia's electoral system was reformed in 2011, such that parliamentary mandates were awarded in numerical order to candidates on successful lists. New Serbia joined the Progressive Party's Let's Get Serbia Moving coalition for the 2012 parliamentary election. Markićević was given the fifty-second position on the alliance's electoral list and was elected when the list won seventy-three mandates. After the election, New Serbia joined a coalition government led by the Progressive Party; Markićević returned to the government side in the assembly and served as party whip.

He criticized the International Criminal Tribunal for the former Yugoslavia's 2008 acquittal of Croatian generals Ante Gotovina and Mladen Markač for crimes against humanity, describing the decision as proof that the court was a political entity serving the will of powerful countries.

New Serbia continued its alliance with the Progressive Party through the elections of 2014 and 2016. Markićević received high list positions each time and was re-elected when the alliance won landslide victories on both occasions.

New Serbia leader Velimir Ilić withdrew his support from the Progressive Party and the administration of prime minister Aleksandar Vučić in January 2017. This decision precipitated a split in the New Serbia caucus. Three of New Serbia's five elected members left the party and continued to support Vučić's administration, while the remaining two (Markićević and Goran Pekarski) moved into opposition and joined with other parliamentarians to create a new caucus called New Serbia–Movement for Serbia's Salvation. In October 2017, Pekarski also left New Serbia to re-align himself with Vučić's administration, leaving Markićević as the only remaining member of his party in the assembly.

Markićević currently serves as deputy leader of the New Serbia–Movement for Serbia's Salvation group. He is a member of Serbia's parliamentary friendship group with Russia.
