= Stanislava Pak =

Serbian politician and television presenter

- Станислава Пак
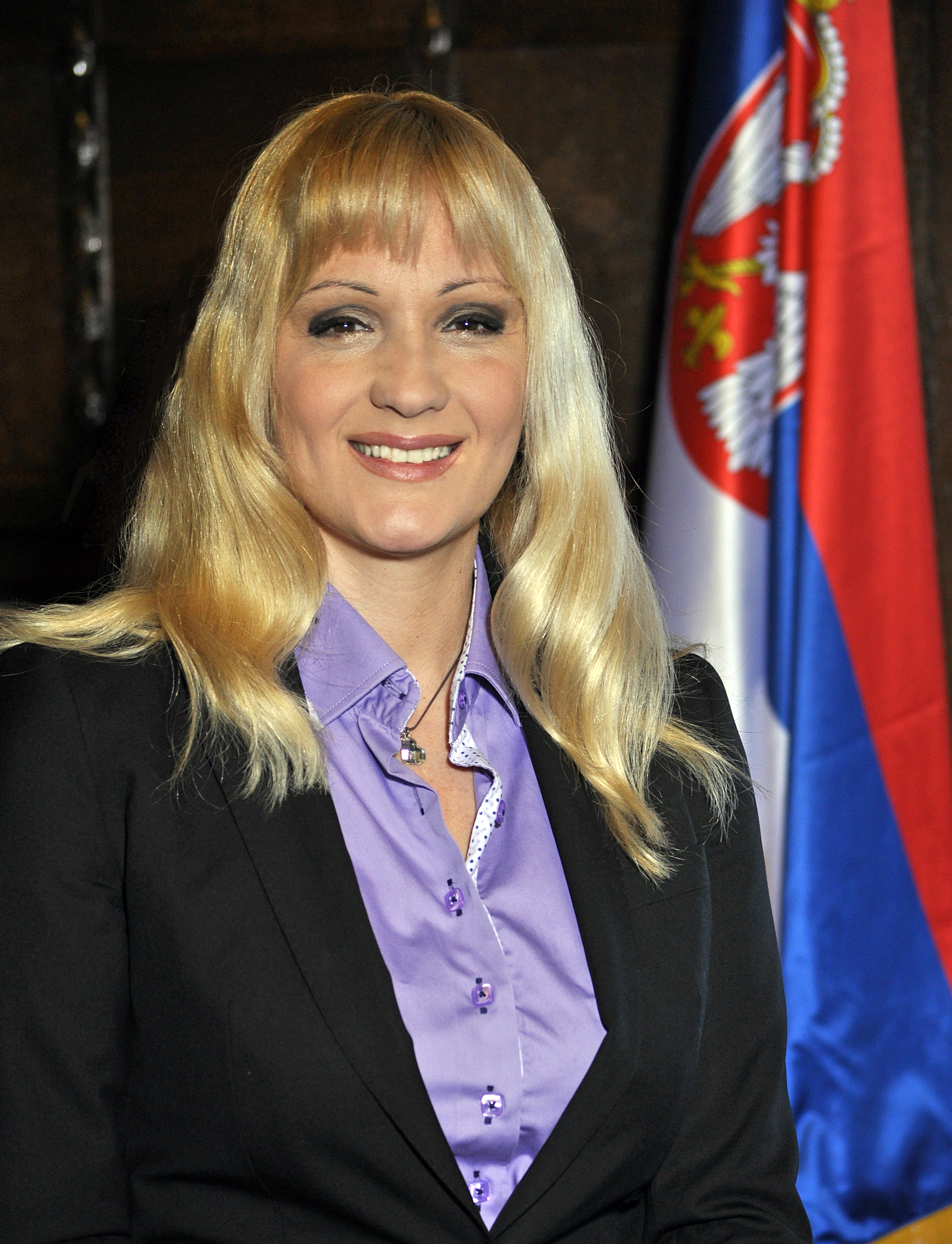
- Pak in 2013

Advisor to the President of Serbia
- In office 13 February 2013 – 31 May 2017
- President: Tomislav Nikolić

Personal details
- Born: 26 December 1971 (age 54) Belgrade, SR Serbia, SFR Yugoslavia
- Party: SNS (2009–2023); UZS (2023–present)
- Education: University of Belgrade

Stanislava Pak Stanković (Serbian Cyrillic: Станислава Пак Станковић; born 26 December 1971) is a Serbian politician and television presenter who served as the advisor to the president of Serbia from 2013 to 2017. She was a high-ranking member of the Serbian Progressive Party (SNS) from 2009 to 2023.

== Early life and education ==
Pak was born on 26 December 1971 in Belgrade, SR Serbia, SFR Yugoslavia. Her father, Milan Pak, is a retired professor at the Faculty of Law in Belgrade, while her mother is also a professor. Her father is of paternal Slovenian descent. She graduated from the Faculty of Law in 1994. She specialized in media law at the Center for Comparative Media Law and Policy at the Center for Social and Legal Studies, University of Oxford.

== Career ==
From 1989 to 1996, she worked in the entertainment program of the Radio Television of Serbia as the host of TV Slagalica, 7 TV days and Loto shows. In 1996, she transferred to the editorial office of the news program where she worked as a journalist and presenter, and since 2000, when Gordana Suša was the editor-in-chief of the news program, she was the editor of Dnevnik program on RTS.

She was the chief of staff and spokesperson of Komercijalna banka from 2001 to 2004, and later worked in KBC Bank as the director of communications from 2004 to 2010. From 2010 to 2012, she worked at Securitas SE as the sales director.

== Political career ==
In 2009, she joined the populist Serbian Progressive Party (SNS) led by Tomislav Nikolić and Aleksandar Vučić, where she was a high-ranking member and a member of the main board. In 2012, following the presidential election and the victory of Tomislav Nikolić, Pak was appointed head of the press service of the president of Serbia. She was appointed media advisor to the president of Serbia Tomislav Nikolić in 2013 and served until 2017. Aleksandar Vučić was elected president in 2017 and Pak continued working in the presidency under Vučić.

In May 2023, during the ongoing protests, Pak announced that she is leaving SNS and called on the citizens of Serbia not to attend SNS's rally on 26 May, claiming that she worked in the presidency under Vučić for five years without regulated employment status and without health insurance for her and her children. She assessed that Vučić "pathologically hates the opposition". Prime Minister Ana Brnabić reacted to Pak's statements by saying that she doesn't think her claims about her employment status are true. Another former high-ranking SNS member Dragan Šormaz who left the party a few days before Pak stated that Pak's claims and her decision to leave the party "will contribute to the truth", but that Vučić will now only start to "tighten the situation in society even more".

Pak became a founding member of Always for Serbia, led by Zorana Mihajlović, in September 2023.
