= Ministry of Construction and Urbanism (Serbia) =

- Министарство грађевине и урбанизма Ministarstvo građevine i urbanizma

Ministry overview
- Formed: 11 February 1991
- Dissolved: 27 April 2014
- Superseding Ministry: Ministry of Construction, Transportation and Infrastructure
- Jurisdiction: Government of Serbia

The Ministry of Construction and Urbanism of the Republic of Serbia (Serbian: Министарство грађевине и урбанизма / Ministarstvo građevine i urbanizma) was the ministry in the Government of Serbia which was in charge of construction and urbanism. The ministry was merged into the Ministry of Construction, Transportation and Infrastructure on 27 April 2014.

== List of ministers ==
Minister	Image	Party	Term start	Term end	Lifespan
Miodrag Janjić		Socialist Party of Serbia (SPS)	11 February 1991	23 December 1991	1929–
Uroš Banjanin		Socialist Party of Serbia (SPS)	23 December 1991	18 March 1994	1944–
Branislav Ivković		Socialist Party of Serbia (SPS)	18 March 1994	24 March 1998	1952–
Dejan Kovačević		Socialist Party of Serbia (SPS)	24 March 1998	25 January 2001	1940–2021
Dragoslav Šumarac		Democratic Party (DS)	25 January 2001	3 March 2004	1955–
Velimir Ilić		New Serbia (NS)	27 July 2012	27 April 2014	1951–
