= Ozon Radio =

- Čačak; Serbia
- Frequency: 98.3 MHz

Programming
- Format: Commercial radio, Informative station

History
- First air date: September 1996; 29 years ago

Links
- Website: ozonpress.net

Ozon Radio is a radio station based in Čačak, Serbia.

== History ==
The radio station working in September 1996 from a passenger trailer. Within a month it became the most listened radio station in Čačak as the election campaign was in progress for local and federal elections. Ozon was broadcasting informative and contact programs substantially different from regime stations as the only active ones in Čačak at the time.

Ozon came on regime blacklist very soon, so passenger trailer kept moving around Čačak in order to avoid police.

Since regime stations forbid or censured presentations of opposition candidates, some smaller stations took liberty to show these presentations, and Ozon was among them. Ozon was the only free radio in wide area presenting informative programs and presentations candidates of opposition parties where they could present their political views and programs and listeners actively participate with their comments and questions.

At that time Ozon was continuously broadcasting (live) meetings and demonstrations, statements of political parties' leaders, public persons and citizens. It was the time when Ozon started taking over informative programs of B92 Radio, larger anti-regime station from Belgrade, though with very obscure techniques.

Of course, since it wouldn't comply with regime policy of Slobodan Milošević they were banned and there were often attempts to shut down the station and arrest staff. Federal inspector for radio communications, assisted by the police, forbade work of Ozon Radio on November 29, 1996. Five-day protests followed at the town square in Čačak, where some 3,000 to 5,000 people gathered day after day. To people's insisting Ozon continued programs broadcasting.

Due to its large influence on local people, high ratings of listening and constant struggle with regime, Ozon radio greatly contributed winning of opposition at the local elections in Cacak. With the change of local power, they finally moved from passenger trailer to a temporary studio. Ozon editors continued their fight against the regime, but now, with new local government, they started to inform people on various cases of political and financial scams of new authorities. New authorities were not interesting in further work of Ozon, as they got to manage municipal Radio Čačak. There were many incidents with the new mayor of Cacak - Velimir Ilić including one, while he was sending message to Ozon members to 'watchout', his members crashed into studio of Radio Ozon.

Ozon continued work with primitive technical equipment it had, moving their premises twice. Ozon radio is one of the full members of independent association of electronic media - ANEM that provided education to journalists and personnel active in marketing. Besides programs of its own production, Ozon used to take over B92 programs, BBC, Radio Free Europe/Radio Liberty, Voice Of America VOA, Deutsche Welle DW and FE in Serbian language until this was forbidden by law.

This is a non-commercial informative radio station.

From the end of March 1999, Ozon temporarily discontinued work, as the state of war was declared. Two days upon forbidding B92, Federal inspector for radio communications, assisted by special police, grabbed broadcasting technical equipment of TV Čačak and tried to do the same with Ozon Radio. But Ozon team had timely hidden their equipment and so saved it for the future.

== Today ==
Ozon Radio continues to operate as a legal station, with the goal of bringing quick and accurate information to its audience. The station is the top-ranked news and information station in the region.

== Affiliate ==
During 2005 company owning Ozon radio, launched weekly newspapers called Čačanske novine. This newspaper cover local and regional topics.
