= Rodoljub Petrović =

Serbian journalist and politician

Rodoljub Petrović (Serbian Cyrillic: Родољуб Петровић; 6 September 1940–24 January 2024) was a Serbian journalist and politician. He was the mayor of Čačak from 1992 to 1996 and served in the Serbian parliament from 1994 to 1997. Petrović was a member of the Socialist Party of Serbia (SPS).

== Early life and private career ==
Petrović was born in the settlement of Ljubić in Čačak, in what was then the Drina Banovina of the Kingdom of Yugoslavia. He was raised in the Federal People's Republic of Yugoslavia after World War II and graduated from the University of Belgrade Faculty of Agriculture.

Petrović was editor-in-chief of Radio Čačak from 1967 to 1974 and worked afterward as a correspondent for Tanjug and Politika, also writing for the local papers Čačanski glas and Čačanske novine. He edited the books Čačak u prošlosti (1993) and Ovako je bilo (1999) and authored the monographs Priča o Ljubiću (2004) and Ljubićki vekovi – dva stoleća od legendarnog boja (2015). Petrović received the annual Velibor Popović award from Tanjug in 1999. He retired from journalism in 2012 and was given a Lifetime Achievement Award from the Association of Journalists of Serbia and Montenegro in 2014.

== Politician ==
=== Mayor of Čačak ===
Petrović was elected to the Čačak municipal assembly in the May 1992 Serbian local elections. The Socialists won the elections in the city, and he was subsequently chosen as the assembly's president, a position that was then equivalent to mayor.

During the 1990s, the Socialist Party dominated political life in Serbia under the authoritarian rule of Slobodan Milošević. Many leading opposition parties boycotted the May 1992 elections; due to ongoing doubts about the legitimacy of the vote, a new round of local elections was held in December 1992, this time with the opposition's participation. The Socialists again won the elections in Čačak and Petrović was confirmed afterward for a second term as mayor.

While serving as mayor, Petrović hosted a local television call-in program. He was criticized in some circles for his frequent use of the phrase, "Nismo nadležni" ("We Are Not in Charge") in response to questions that fell outside the municipal government's purview. This notwithstanding, Petrović convinced the local transportation company Autoprevoz to reduce its prices in February 1996.

In December 1995, Petrović signed an agreement with Eduard Hronský, the mayor of Trnava, Slovakia, for increased economic, cultural, and sports cooperation between the two cities.

The Čačak SPS organization became divided into rival factions during Petrović's mayoralty, respectively led by Petrović and local party president Rajko Baralić.

=== Parliamentarian ===
Petrović appeared in the eleventh position on the SPS's electoral list for the Kragujevac division in the 1992 Serbian parliamentary election, which took place concurrently with the December 1992 local vote. Although the list won eleven seats in the division, he did not receive a mandate. (From 1992 to 2000, Serbia's electoral law stipulated that one-third of parliamentary mandates would be assigned to candidates from successful lists in numerical order, while the remaining two-thirds would be distributed amongst other candidates at the discretion of the sponsoring parties. It was common practice for the latter mandates to be awarded out of numerical order. Petrović was not automatically elected by virtue of his list position, and he did not receive an "optional" mandate.)

He was promoted to the fourth position on the SPS's list for Kragujevac in the 1993 Serbian parliamentary election and was elected when the list won twelve mandates in the division. He took his seat when the assembly convened in January 1994 and served on its culture and information committee. The SPS won a strong plurality victory overall in the 1993 election and afterward formed a new government with support from the smaller New Democracy (ND) party.

In April 1996, Petrović became a member of the SPS's information council.

=== The 1996 local elections and after ===
The opposition Zajedno coalition won an unexpectedly strong victory in Čačak in the 1996 Serbian local elections, taking fifty-seven out of seventy seats, while the Socialists fell to only eight. Velimir Ilić, then a member of the Serbian Renewal Movement (SPO), became the city's new mayor. Petrović was not a candidate in the 1997 Serbian parliamentary election, and his term in the national assembly ended in that year. He appears to have generally withdrawn from political life after this time.

In 2019, he took part in an event commemorating the twenty-ninth anniversary of SPS in Čačak.

== Death ==
Petrović died on 24 January 2024 after a short illness.
