= Dragan Šormaz =

Serbian politician

- Драган Шормаз
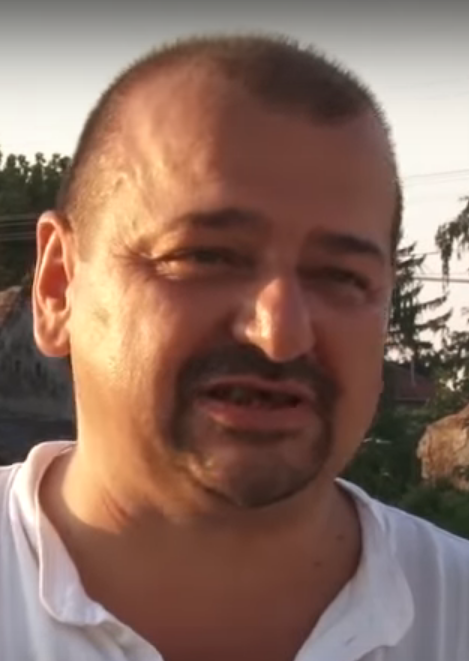

Member of the National Assembly
- In office 2001–2022

Personal details
- Born: 5 May 1967 (age 58) Drvar, SR Bosnia and Herzegovina, SFR Yugoslavia
- Party: DSS (1992–2010); SNS (2010–2023); UZS (2023)

Dragan Šormaz (Serbian Cyrillic: Драган Шормаз; born 4 May 1967) is a Serbian politician who served in the National Assembly of Serbia on an almost continuous basis from 2001 to 2022. At one time a leading member of the Democratic Party of Serbia (Demokratska stranka Srbije, DSS), he later joined the Serbian Progressive Party (Srpska napredna stranka, SNS) and was its member from 2010 to 2023.

== Early life, career, and private life ==
Šormaz was born in Drvar, in what was then the Socialist Republic of Bosnia and Herzegovina in the Socialist Federal Republic of Yugoslavia. His father was a judge and his family moved frequently in his youth; he lived at different times in Lebane, Negotin, Velika Plana, and Požarevac. He now lives in Smederevo and has a background in labour relations.

Šormaz is a huge fan of hard rock and heavy metal. According to an article in Danas, he once told his colleagues of his disappointment at having to attend a political meeting while Metallica and Def Leppard were playing in Sofia, Bulgaria.

== Political career ==
=== Democratic Party of Serbia ===
Šormaz joined the DSS on its formation in 1992. He was an opponent of Slobodan Milošević's administration throughout the 1990s and led the DSS municipal committee in Smederevo in 2000; in an interview from this period, he said that police had threatened members of his party with arrest if they took part in an anti-Milošević protest. Milošević was defeated by DSS leader Vojislav Koštunica in the September 2000 Yugoslavian presidential election, an event that precipitated a large-scale change in Yugoslavian and Serbian politics.

The DSS contested the subsequent 2000 Serbian parliamentary election as part of the Democratic Opposition of Serbia (DOS), a broad and ideologically diverse coalition of parties that had opposed Milošević's regime. Šormaz received the sixty-first position on the DOS's electoral list and was awarded a mandate after the list won a landslide victory with 176 out of 250 seats. (From 2000 to 2011, parliamentary mandates were awarded to sponsoring parties or coalitions rather than to individual candidates, and the mandates were often awarded out of numerical order. Šormaz did not automatically receive a mandate by virtue of his position on the list.) He took his seat when the assembly met in early 2001. After the election, the DOS formed a new administration under the leadership of Democratic Party (Demokratska stranka, DS) leader Zoran Đinđić. In 2002, the DSS left the DOS and moved to the opposition, emerging as prominent rivals of the DS. The parliamentary mandates of several DSS members, including Šormaz, were nullified at the discretion of the DOS on 12 June 2002, although this decision was subsequently revoked and the mandates restored.

The Federal Republic of Yugoslavia was officially reconstituted as the State Union of Serbia and Montenegro in February 2003, and the Assembly of Serbia and Montenegro was established as its legislative branch. The first members of this body were chosen by indirect election from the republican parliaments of Serbia and Montenegro, with each parliamentary group allowed representation proportional to its numbers. Only sitting members of the Serbian assembly or the Montenegrin assembly, or members of the Federal Assembly of Yugoslavia at the time of the country's reconstitution, were eligible to serve. The DSS was permitted seventeen members in the federal assembly, and Šormaz was included in the party's delegation. He served in this role until a new federal assembly delegation was selected in early 2004; he also continued to serve in the National Assembly during this time.

Đinđić was assassinated in early 2003, an event that ultimately led to further divisions in the DOS and a new parliamentary election in December of the same year. Šormaz received the thirty-sixth position on the DSS's list and was awarded a mandate when the list won fifty-three seats. The DSS emerged as the leading party in a new coalition government formed after this election, and Vojislav Koštunica was selected as Serbia's new prime minister. Šormaz served as a member of the assembly's defence and security committee in the parliament that followed. In March 2004, he criticized Dušan Mihajlović, the minister of internal affairs in the previous government, for restructuring the ministry and appointing allies to key positions just before the DSS-led coalition took power. Šormaz was part of Dragan Maršićanin's campaign headquarters in the 2004 Serbian presidential election.

Following the election of Ramush Haradinaj as prime minister of Kosovo in late 2004, Šormaz stated that Kosovo Albanian authorities wanted to ethnically cleanse Kosovo and Metohija and urged the international community to "be able to respond adequately" if there was a repeat of the 2004 unrest in the disputed territory. He also stated that Serbia could resolve the status of Kosovo by military means if it so chose, provided the international community did not interfere, although he added, "that is not the option we choose." He argued in favour of a political solution with Kosovo and Metohija receiving greater autonomy as a province in Serbia.

In an early 2005 interview, former Zoran Đinđić aide Vladimir Popović charged that Vojislav Koštunica was supporting the hardline nationalists who had killed the former prime minister. Šormaz, speaking on behalf of his party, responded that any such suggestions were "pure lies."

During the 2006 Montenegrin parliamentary election, Šormaz urged the newly formed Serb List alliance to unite with a coalition led by the Socialist People's Party of Montenegro in a bid to defeat Milo Đukanović's administration. Šormaz was at this time the deputy chair of the DSS's executive committee.

Šormaz received the forty-ninth position on an electoral list led by the DSS and New Serbia in the 2007 parliamentary election and was given a third mandate after the alliance won forty-seven seats. This election resulted in an unstable coalition government led by the DSS and the DS, with Koštunica continuing in the role of prime minister. Šormaz served as deputy chair of the defence and security committee and was a member of Serbia's delegation to the NATO Parliamentary Assembly (where Serbia has observer status). He opposed the suggestion that Serbia should join the North Atlantic Treaty Organization (NATO) and remarked that even Serbia's co-operation with NATO was threatened by the latter's attitude toward the status of Kosovo and Metohija. On one occasion, he accused NATO of ignoring United Nations Security Council Resolution 1244, saying, "They are not doing any work down there [in Kosovo and Metohija]; they are sitting in pubs and bars while Serbs are being killed and their property destroyed." Some in the DS said these comments were harmful to Serbia's interests; Šormaz rejected this and added that the DSS "could not care less" about criticism from their coalition partners. This controversy led to a serious rift between the parties.

Šormaz later stated that Serbia wished to become a member of the European Union but would not give up its sovereignty over Kosovo and Metohija as a condition of joining. In late 2007, he said that a Russian military base should be established in the disputed territory via a new resolution of the United Nations Security Council.

Šormaz was given the twenty-eighth position on the DSS–New Serbia list for the 2008 Serbian parliamentary election, which was called following Kosovo's unilateral declaration of independence. The list won thirty seats, and he was awarded a mandate for a fourth term. The results of the election were initially inconclusive, but a new coalition government was eventually formed by the For a European Serbia alliance, led by the DS, and the Socialist Party of Serbia. The DSS moved into opposition. Šormaz was again appointed as a representative of his party on the defence and security committee.

Šormaz was strongly critical of the Norwegian Nobel Committee's decision in late 2008 to award the Nobel Peace Prize to Martti Ahtisaari, whose plan for the status of Kosovo had been strongly opposed by many in Serbia and is generally considered to have influenced Kosovo's declaration of independence. Šormaz was quoted as saying, "I can only state that this is sad. [...] This is incomprehensible for me, but it, too, also speaks about the attitude held by certain international institutions towards with regard to what is being done."

He was expelled from the DSS in May 2010 after criticizing Koštunica's leadership. In December of the same year, he joined the recently formed Progressive Party.

=== Serbian Progressive Party ===
Serbia's electoral system was reformed in 2011, such that parliamentary mandates were awarded in numerical order to candidates on successful lists. Šormaz was given the sixty-first position on the Progressive Party's Let's Get Serbia Moving list in the 2012 parliamentary election and was re-elected when the list won seventy-three mandates. The Progressives subsequently formed a new coalition government with the Socialist Party, and Šormaz again served as a government supporter. He was given reasonably high positions on the Progressive Party's successor lists for the 2014 and 2016 elections and was re-elected when the lists won landslide victories both times.

In 2015, Šormaz said that Serbia's existing relationship with NATO was beneficial because it provided "security and standards in the military" but that Serbia should not join the alliance; he was quoted as saying, "neither has NATO invited Serbia, nor has Serbia said it wants to be a member." He later opposed Russia's request for Serbia to grant diplomatic passports to Russian firefighters, saying that neither the United States of America nor Russia should be permitted to place undue political pressure on Serbia.

Regarding the status of Serbia's legislative branch, Šormaz remarked in 2016, "I think great progress has been made in the way [...] the [p]arliament fought for its position regarding control of the agencies and ministries, compared with 2000 when I first became a member."

During the 2016–20 parliament, Šormaz was a member of the assembly's foreign affairs committee, European integration committee, and security services control committee; a deputy member of the committee on constitutional and legislature issues; a member of the European Union–Serbia stabilization and association parliamentary committee; the head of Serbia's delegation to the NATO Parliamentary Assembly; the leader of Serbia's parliamentary friendship group with the United States of America; and a member of the parliamentary friendship groups with Germany and Liechtenstein.

He received the 115th position on the Progressive Party's Aleksandar Vučić — For Our Children coalition list in the 2020 Serbian parliamentary election and was elected to an eighth term when the list won a landslide majority with 188 mandates. He continues to serve on the foreign affairs committee and the stabilization and association committee, lead Serbia's delegation to the NATO PA, and lead Serbia's parliamentary friendship group with the United States of America, as well as serving in the friendship group with the United Kingdom. Unlike some in his party, Šormaz is a vocal critic of Vladimir Putin and Russian influence in Serbian affairs.

=== Always for Serbia ===
In May 2023, Šormaz voiced his support to the ongoing protests and announced he is leaving SNS. He became a founding member of Always for Serbia, led by Zorana Mihajlović, in September 2023.

== Sports ==
Šormaz was vice-president of FK Sartid in 2001 and in that capacity took part in a fact-finding mission to Dundee, Scotland, prior to a match against Dundee F.C.
