= Maja Sedlarević =

Serbian politician

Maja Sedlarević (Serbian Cyrillic: Маја Седларевић; born 8 April 1977) is a politician in Serbia. She has served in the Assembly of Vojvodina since 2004 as a member of the League of Social Democrats of Vojvodina (LSV).

== Early life and private career ==
Sedlarević was born in Sremska Mitrovica, Vojvodina, in what was then the Socialist Republic of Serbia in the Socialist Federal Republic of Yugoslavia. She was raised in the city and graduated from the University of Novi Sad's Faculty of Philosophy, in the department of Serbian language and literature. She later earned a master's degree from the university's department of gender studies; her thesis was entitled, Zastupljenost i uticaj žena u Skupštini AP Vojvodine u periodu 2000–2004. godina (English: "Representation and influence of women in the Assembly of the AP Vojvodina in the period 2000-2004"). She now lives in Novi Sad.

== Political career ==
=== Vojvodina ===
Sedlarević joined the LSV in 1997. She served on the party's main board from 2000 to 2005 and was secretary-general and president of the executive committee of its women's forum from 2004 to 2005. She became president of the women's forum in 2006 and so joined the party's presidency. In 2012, she was chosen as director of the party's education center.

She was first elected to the Vojvodina Assembly in the 2004 provincial election. At the time, half of the members in Vojvodina's provincial assembly were elected in single-member constituency seats and the other half by proportional representation. Sedlarević was included on the electoral list for the LSV-led Together for Vojvodina coalition and was awarded one of its six list mandates. Together for Vojvodina joined the province's coalition government after the election, and she served as a supporter of the administration.

Sedlarević received the third position on the Together for Vojvodina list in the 2008 provincial election and was given a mandate for a second term when the list won five proportional seats. She was subsequently chosen as a vice-president (i.e., deputy speaker) of the assembly, was chair of the assembly committee on European integration and inter-regional co-operation, served on both the assembly security council and the provincial security council, and was a delegate to the Assembly of European Regions. She supported greater autonomy for Vojvodina, calling for a new constitution that would effectively provide the province with "executive, legislative and judicial power, as well as basic revenue."

The LSV contested the 2012 provincial election under its own name and won eight mandates via the proportional system; Sedlarević received the sixth position and was re-elected. She again served as chair of the European integration and inter-regional co-operation committee and served on both the assembly and provincial security councils. In 2015, she sought to close down the Senta office of István Szávay, a member of the far-right Jobbik party in Hungary, on the grounds that the office had been used to promote inter-ethnic hatred.

Vojvodina switched to an entirely proportional system for the 2016 provincial election. Sedlarević again received the third position on the LSV list and re-elected to a fourth term when the list won nine seats. This election was won by the Serbian Progressive Party and its allies, and the LSV now serves in opposition.

Sedlarević identifies as a feminist and is a vocal supporter of abortion rights in Serbia. In 2016, she withdrew from a planned appearance at a panel discussion on women's issues after learning that representatives of Dveri and Zavetnici would be present. Sedlarević said that she could not share a stage with ultra-traditionalist and pro-fascist organizations.

She is currently an alternate member of the Chamber of Regions in the Congress of Local and Regional Authorities of the Council of Europe. She serves with the Socialist Group and is an alternate member of the current affairs committee.

=== National Assembly ===
Sedlarević has been a candidate for the National Assembly of Serbia on three occasions. In the 2003 parliamentary election, she was included on the LSV's Together for Tolerance list, which did not cross the electoral threshold to win representation.

The LSV contested the 2007 Serbian parliamentary election in alliance with the Liberal Democratic Party and other parties. Sedlarević received the 198th list position; the list won fifteen seats, and she was not selected for a mandate. (From 2000 to 2011, Serbian parliamentary mandates were awarded to sponsoring parties or coalitions rather than to individual candidates, and it was common practice for mandates to be awarded out of numerical order. Sedlarević could have been awarded a mandate despite her low position on the list – which was in any event mostly alphabetical – though in fact she was not.)

Serbia's electoral system was reformed in 2011, such that parliamentary mandates were awarded in numerical order to candidates on successful lists. The LSV contested the 2016 parliamentary election on a combined list with the LDP and the Social Democratic Party, winning thirteen seats. Sedlarević received the fifteenth position on the list and narrowly missed election. She is currently the next LSV candidate on the list with the right to accept a mandate if another member elected for the party leaves the assembly.
