= Velimir Stanojević =

Serbian politician

Velimir Stanojević (Serbian Cyrillic: Велимир Станојевић; born 11 June 1964) is a politician in Serbia. He has served four terms in the National Assembly of Serbia and was mayor of Čačak from 2004 to 2012. Stanojević was a founding member of New Serbia and remained in the party until 2017, when he left due to disagreements with party leader Velimir Ilić. He is currently state secretary in Serbia's ministry of agriculture, forestry, and water economy.

== Early life and career ==
Stanojević was born and raised in Čačak and graduated from the University of Belgrade Faculty of Agriculture in Zemun. He worked at Čačak's fruit-growing institute from 1989 to 1998 and was director of the public company Gradsko zelenilo from 1998 to 2000.

== Political career ==
Stanojević was elected to the municipal assembly of Čačak in the 1996 and 2000 local elections, serving from 1996 to 2004. During his second term, he was deputy chair of the assembly's executive board.

He was first elected to the National Assembly in the 2003 Serbian parliamentary election. New Serbia contested this election on a coalition electoral list with the Serbian Renewal Movement. Stanojević received the sixteenth position on the list and was elected when it won twenty-two mandates. (From 2000 to 2011, Serbian parliamentary mandates were awarded to sponsoring parties or coalitions rather than to individual candidates, and it was common practice for the mandates to be awarded out of numerical order. While Stanojević did not automatically receive a mandate by virtue of his position on the list, he was in fact chosen to serve and took his seat when the parliament met in 2004.) New Serbia participated in a coalition government after the election, and Stanojević was part of the government's parliamentary majority.

Stanojević was also chosen as president of the Čačak municipal assembly in March 2000 and subsequently won a direct election to become mayor of the city in the 2004 local elections. At the time, he was permitted to serve in a dual mandate as mayor and as a member of the National Assembly. He was chosen as a vice-president of New Serbia at a party convention in November 2005.

In October 2006, the government of Serbia allocated the equivalent of 7.3 million Euros to Čačak under a five-year National Investment Plan. Stanojević indicated that the money would be spent primarily on infrastructure projects, including reconstruction of the city's road and water supply networks, with further investments in education, health, and housing. In a 2012 interview, he spoke of creating the conditions for a University of Western Serbia to be established in the city.

Serbia abandoned direct mayoral elections after 2004, and Stanojević was selected for a second term as mayor of Čačak by a vote of the municipal assembly following the 2008 local elections. He also appeared as a New Serbia candidate in the 2007 and 2008 parliamentary elections (both of which the party contested with the Democratic Party of Serbia), although he did not take a seat in the assembly on either occasion.

Serbia's electoral system was reformed in 2011, such that parliamentary mandates were awarded in numerical order to candidates on successful lists. New Serbia joined the Progressive Party's Let's Get Serbia Moving coalition for the 2012 parliamentary election. Stanojević was given the seventeenth position on the coalition's list and was elected when it won seventy-three mandates. After the election, New Serbia joined a new coalition government led by the Progressive Party, and Stanojević again served as a government supporter in the assembly. He was re-elected on the Progressive-led lists in the 2014 and 2016 elections, in which the Progressives and their allies won majority victories.

He resigned from the assembly on 1 December 2016 after being appointed as state secretary in Serbia's ministry of agriculture and environment (later renamed as the ministry of agriculture, forestry, and water economy). He continues to hold this position as of 2020.

In early 2017, New Serbia leader Velimir Ilić withdrew his support from the administration of Progressive Party leader Aleksandar Vučić and supported Vuk Jeremić's candidacy in the 2017 Serbian presidential election. This led to a serious split in the party, with Stanojević and several other prominent New Serbia members leaving to become independents.
