= Aleksandar Antić =

Serbian politician (born 1969)

- Александар Антић
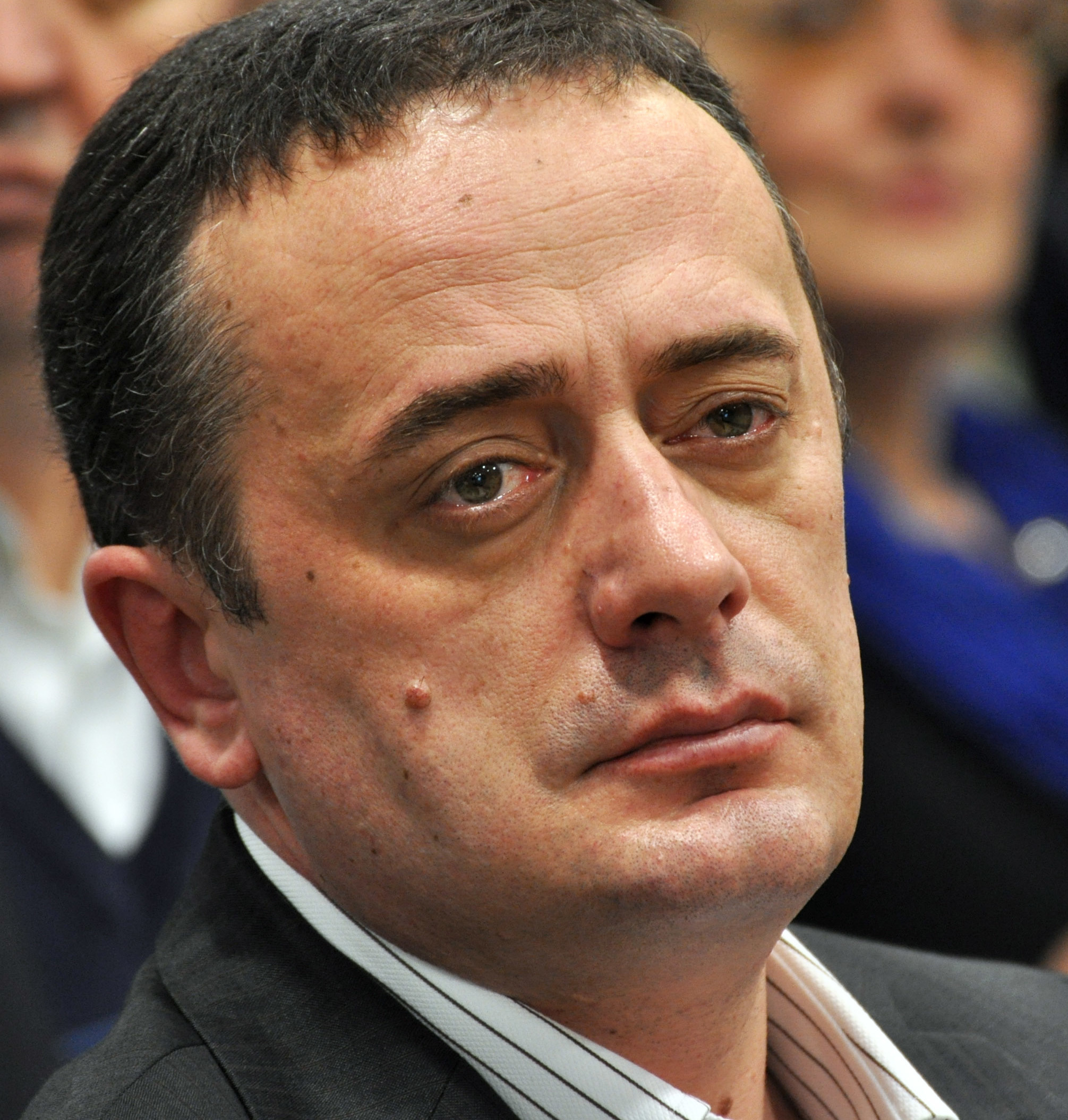
- Aleksandar Antić

Minister of Mining and Energy
- In office 27 April 2014 – 28 October 2020
- Prime Minister: Aleksandar Vučić; Ivica Dačić (Acting); Ana Brnabić
- Preceded by: Zorana Mihajlović (Energy); Milan Bačević (Mining)
- Succeeded by: Zorana Mihajlović

Minister of Transportation
- In office 2 September 2013 – 27 April 2014
- Prime Minister: Ivica Dačić
- Preceded by: Milutin Mrkonjić
- Succeeded by: Zorana Mihajlović

Personal details
- Born: 7 May 1969 (age 56) Belgrade, Serbia, Yugoslavia
- Party: Socialist Party of Serbia

Aleksandar Antić (Serbian Cyrillic: Александар Антић; born 7 May 1969) is a Serbian politician. He served as the Minister of Energy and Mining between 2014 and 2020. Antić previously served as the Minister of Transportation from 2013 to 2014. He is a member of the Socialist Party of Serbia.

== Career ==
Antić was born on 7 May 1969 in Belgrade. He was a councilor in the Municipal Assembly of Zvezdara for two terms (1992–1996) and was elected Socialist Party of Serbia (SPS) member of the Assembly of the City of Belgrade three times. From 2004 to 2008, he was the President of the SPS parliamentary group in the Assembly of the City of Belgrade.

He served as the president of the Assembly of the City of Belgrade from 2008 to 2012. In 2013, he became a Minister of Transportation in the Government of Ivica Dačić, and served until the 2014 Serbian parliamentary election, after which he became a Minister of Mining and Energy per 27 April 2014 in the Government of Aleksandar Vučić. While talking to the press on 4 December 2014 he was hit by an approximately three-kilogram chunk of ice that fell from a powerline. He was unhurt as he wore a hard hat. He lost his position with the formation of the second cabinet of Ana Brnabić and was succeeded as Minister by Zorana Mihajlović on 28 October 2020.

Political offices
Preceded by Milutin Mrkonjić	Minister of Transportation; 2013–2014	Succeeded by Zorana Mihajlović
Preceded by Zorana Mihajlović (Energy); Milan Bačević (Mining)	Minister of Mining and Energy; 2014–2020	Succeeded by Zorana Mihajlović
