= Milutin Mrkonjić =

Serbian politician (1942–2021)

- Милутин Мркоњић
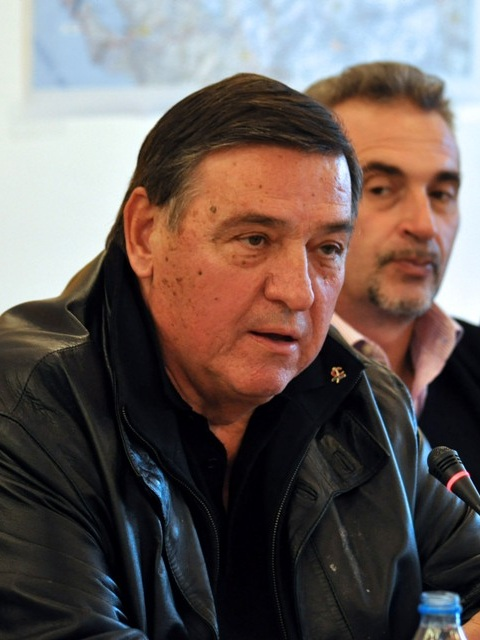
- Mrkonjić in 2011

Minister of Transportation
- In office 27 July 2012 – 2 September 2013
- Prime Minister: Ivica Dačić
- Preceded by: Himself
- Succeeded by: Aleksandar Antić

Minister of Infrastructure and Energy
- In office 14 March 2011 – 27 July 2012
- Prime Minister: Mirko Cvetković
- Preceded by: Himself; Petar Škundrić (Energy)
- Succeeded by: Himself; Zorana Mihajlović (Energy)

Minister of Infrastructure
- In office 7 July 2008 – 14 March 2011
- Prime Minister: Mirko Cvetković
- Preceded by: Velimir Ilić
- Succeeded by: Himself

Personal details
- Born: 23 May 1942 Belgrade, German-occupied Serbia
- Died: 27 November 2021 (aged 79) Belgrade, Serbia
- Party: Socialist Party of Serbia
- Spouse: Dragana Mrkonjić
- Domestic partner: Ana Bekuta (2011–2021)
- Education: University of Belgrade
- Occupation: Politician
- Profession: Civil engineer

Milutin Mrkonjić (Serbian Cyrillic: Милутин Мркоњић; pronounced [milǔtin mr̩̂kɔɲitɕ]; 23 May 1942 – 27 November 2021) was a Serbian politician. He co-founded the Socialist Party of Serbia, together with Slobodan Milošević.

== Biography ==
Mrkonjić was born in 1942 in Belgrade, then occupied by Nazi Germany. His father was a Croatian Serb from the village of Bojna, near Glina, in the region of Banija. In 1968, Mrkonjić graduated from the University of Belgrade, Faculty of Civil Engineering. He was the first director of CIP - Institute of Transportation. Mrkonjić was the head of the Reconstruction Agency after NATO bombing of FR Yugoslavia in 1999.

On 8 May 2007, Mrkonjić became vice-president of the National Assembly of Serbia. On 7 July 2008, he became Minister for Infrastructure in the Serbian government. Mrkonjić became the Minister for Infrastructure and Energy in March 2011.

From 2012 until his death, Mrkonjić was in a relationship with Serbian singer Ana Bekuta. He died on 27 November 2021 at the age of 79. Mrkonjić was buried on 2 December in the Alley of Distinguished Citizens at the New Cemetery in Belgrade.

Political offices
Preceded by Velimir Ilić	Minister of Infrastructure of Serbia; 2008–2011	Succeeded by Milutin Mrkonjić
Preceded by Milutin Mrkonjić; Petar Škundrić	Minister of Infrastructure and Energy of Serbia; 2011–2012	Succeeded by Milutin Mrkonjić; Zorana Mihajlović (Energy)
Preceded by Milutin Mrkonjić	Minister of Transportation of Serbia; 2012–2013	Succeeded by Aleksandar Antić
Party political offices
Preceded by Post created	Honorary President of the Socialist Party of Serbia; 2015–2021	Succeeded by None
