= Marija Rašeta Vukosavljević =

Marija Rašeta Vukosavljević (Serbian Cyrillic: Марија Рашета Вукосављевић; born 5 March 1962) is a Serbian former cabinet minister. She was the minister of transport and telecommunications in Serbia's government from 2001 to 2004, serving as a member of the Democratic Party (DS).

== Early life and private career ==
Rašeta Vukosavljević was born in Belgrade, in what was then the People's Republic of Serbia in the Federal People's Republic of Yugoslavia. She graduated from the Civil Engineering School in the city, majoring in construction, and in 1990 she began working at the Institute of Transportation CIP, where she became chief planning engineer in the construction bureau and manager for international operations. In November 1999, she was awarded the Order of Merit for the Federal Republic of Yugoslavia.

Her husband, Vladimir Vukosavljević, was the long-time bodyguard of Zoran Đinđić.

== Cabinet minister ==
=== Đinđić ministry ===
After the fall of Slobodan Milošević in October 2000, the Democratic Opposition of Serbia (DOS) coalition, which included the Democratic Party, won a landslide victory in the 2000 Serbian parliamentary election. DS leader Zoran Đinđić became Serbian prime minister in January 2001, and Rašeta Vukosavljević was appointed as minister of transport and telecommunications in his administration. She said that her first priority was bringing Serbia's Road Directorate back under her ministry's jurisdiction and investing in the republic's roads and railways (which, broadly speaking, were in poor condition). Early in her term, she emerged as a rival of Telekom Srbija leader Draško Petrović.

Much of Rašeta Vukosavljević's work as a government minister was devoted to ensuring international financial support for Serbia's infrastructure. She announced in June 2001 that her ministry expected to raise two hundred million Euros in an upcoming Federal Republic of Yugoslavia Donors' Conference in Brussels. She later welcomed the Southeast European Cooperative Initiative's creation of the Danube Project Center with a branch in Belgrade, and in September 2001 she welcomed a loan of forty-five million Euros for road infrastructure from the European Investment Bank (EIB).

Rašeta Vukosavljević said in October 2001 that Serbia would invest 4.8 billion dinars for its roads over the next year, although she added that Serbia's road network was so dilapidated that five times that amount would ultimately be required to bring it to acceptable standards. The following year, she said that Serbia would need significant outside assistance to repair its road and railway networks in time for the 2004 Summer Olympics in Athens. She welcomed the EIB's investment of another sixty-six million Euros for railways shortly thereafter, and in May 2002 she said that Serbia was expecting to receive two hundred and twenty million Euros for road work from Greece, with one hundred million directed toward infrastructure.

She opened the forty-sixth International Fair of Technology and Technical Achievements at the Belgrade Fair in May 2002; the event featured more than a thousand exhibitions, including about 350 from other countries. In her opening speech, she expressed hope that more young Serbian experts would stop emigrating and "use their knowledge in the right way in their own country." Also in May 2002, she was appointed to a special commission for the coordination of negotiations with the United Nations Interim Administration Mission in Kosovo (UNMIK) on privatization in Kosovo.

In July 2002, Rašeta Vukosavljević signed a long-term contract with the EIB worth 115 million Euros, mostly directed to road reconstruction, on behalf of the Serbian government. Later in the same month, she and Miroljub Labus signed similar agreements with the European Bank for Reconstruction and Development (EBRD). When she opened a meeting of the International Road Congress in Belgrade in September of that year, she said that three hundred kilometres of Serbia's road network had been revitalized in 2001, with a further five hundred scheduled to be completed by the end of 2002.

Rašeta Vukosavljević also announced in September 2002 that Serbia's new law on telecommunications would soon be submitted to the government for review. In November 2002, she announced that the bill had been approved by the government and was being sent to parliament.

=== Živković ministry ===
Serbian Prime Minister Zoran Đinđić was assassinated in March 2003, and Zoran Živković was chosen as his successor. Rašeta Vukosavljević continued to serve as a minister in the new government.

In July 2003, she said that the new highway route between Belgrade and Novi Sad would likely be completed by the end of November.

In September 2003, Rašeta Vukosavljević announced that the first phase of the seven-part "Gate of Serbia" plan had begun at the Belgrade Nikola Tesla Airport. The project was intended to take advantage of Belgrade's strategic location and make the airport a logistics center for air travel in southeast Europe. The following month, she and Branko Dokić, the minister of communication and traffic in the government of Bosnia and Herzegovina, announced the re-establishment of the Belgrade–Sarajevo route for JAT Airways for the first time since the start of the Bosnian War eleven years earlier. Both ministers described this as a major step forward in re-establishing relations between the two countries.

=== Departure from office ===
In August 2003, the G17 Plus party accused Rašeta Vukosavljević of enabling the approval of a favourable loan to a member of her family while serving on the Board of Directors of the Development Fund of Serbia. She rejected all accusations of wrongdoing and accused G17 Plus of spreading "shameless lies" against her and her family; she also wrote an open letter with the official letterhead of her ministry, asking G17 Plus leaders Mlađan Dinkić and Miroljub Labus to clarify aspects of their personal financial situations. She resigned from the Development Fund of Serbia on her own volition in October 2003.

A number of prominent figures in the DOS, including Slobodan Orlić, Dragoljub Mićunović, and Božidar Đelić, called for Rašeta Vukosavljević to be dismissed from cabinet in late 2003. In November of that year, Prime Minister Živković requested that she resign from office due to what he described as a conflict-of-interest situation that had arisen when she established a private company under her name in 2002. He added there was no suggestion of the company being involved in improper activities but said that "the act itself [was] incompatible with the agreement in the Serbian government." She refused to resign, saying that to do so would be an admission of guilt. (The journal NIN noted that the company in question was "Milenijum grup," which was meant to operate in the field of transportation. Rašeta Vukosavljević co-founded the company in March 2002, stood down in October 2002, and later said it had only been a "dead letter on paper" up to the point of her departure.)

The question of her continued presence in Živković's cabinet soon became moot. The Democratic Party fell to thirty-seven seats in the 2003 Serbian parliamentary election and was not included in the new coalition government that took office in March 2004. Rašeta Vukosavljević's term in office came to an end at this time.

== Arrest and acquittal ==
In October 2004, Rašeta Vukosavljević and a number of others were arrested on suspicion of abuse of office; the specific charge was that they had illegally taken more than one and a half million dinars in 2003 and 2004 during the design and reconstruction of Terminal 2 and the VIP lounge at the Belgrade Airport. In July 2012, she and her co-defendants were acquitted by the Higher Court in Belgrade. Their acquittal was upheld by the Court of Appeals in 2013.

== Later career ==
Rašeta Vukosavljević later became director of the digital company TeleGroup Crna Gora.
