= Zorana Mihajlović =

Serbian politician (born 1970)

- Зорана Михајловић
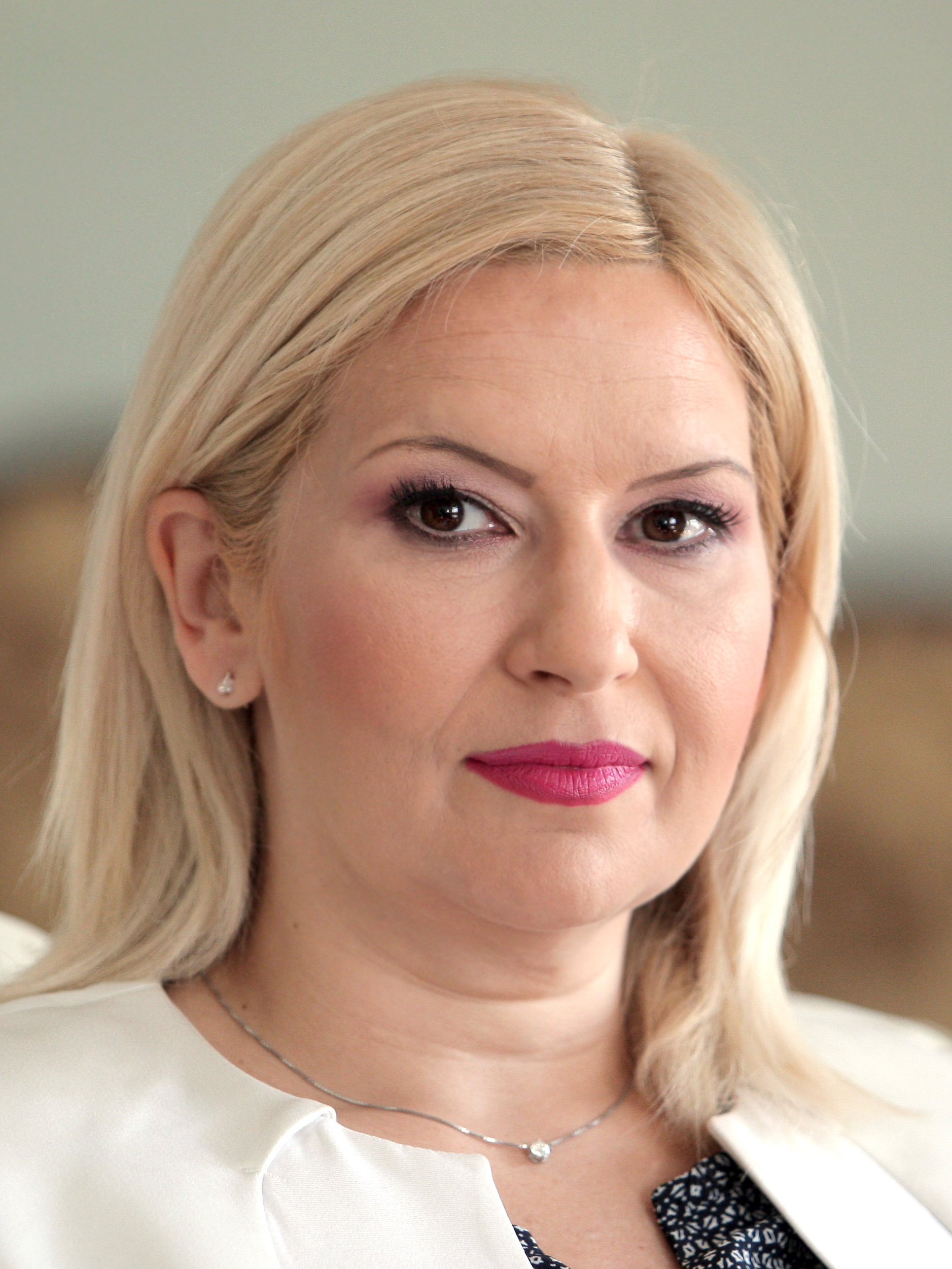
- Mihajlović in 2014

Deputy Prime Minister of Serbia
- In office 27 April 2014 – 26 October 2022
- Prime Minister: Aleksandar Vučić; Ivica Dačić (acting); Ana Brnabić
- Preceded by: Jovan Krkobabić
- Succeeded by: Miloš Vučević

Minister of Mining and Energy
- In office 28 October 2020 – 26 October 2022
- Prime Minister: Ana Brnabić
- Preceded by: Aleksandar Antić
- Succeeded by: Dubravka Đedović
- In office 27 July 2012 – 27 April 2014
- Prime Minister: Ivica Dačić
- Preceded by: Milutin Mrkonjić (Note: Mrkonjić served as minister of energy.); Oliver Dulić (Note: Dulić served as minister of environmental protection.)
- Succeeded by: Aleksandar Antić (Note: Antić served as minister of energy and mining.)

Minister of Construction, Transport, and Infrastructure
- In office 27 April 2014 – 28 October 2020
- Prime Minister: Aleksandar Vučić; Ivica Dačić (acting); Ana Brnabić
- Preceded by: Velimir Ilić (Note: Ilić served as minister of construction and urbanism.); Aleksandar Antić (Note: Antić served as minister of transportation.)

Personal details
- Born: 5 May 1970 (age 56) Tuzla, SR Bosnia and Herzegovina, SFR Yugoslavia
- Party: G17+ (2002–2006); SNS (2010–2023); UZS (2023–2024)
- Education: Faculty of Environmental Sciences
- Occupation: Politician
- Profession: Ecologist

Zorana Mihajlović (Note: Serbian Cyrillic: Зорана Михајловић, pronounced [zǒrana mixǎjloʋitɕ]) (born 5 May 1970) is a Serbian politician who served as deputy prime minister of Serbia from 2014 to 2022 and as minister of mining and energy from 2012 to 2014, and again from 2020 to 2022. A former member of the Serbian Progressive Party (SNS), she previously served as minister of construction, transport and infrastructure from 2014 to 2020.

== Early life and education ==
Mihajlović was born in May 1970 in Tuzla, Bosnia and Herzegovina, but she finished her elementary and secondary school in Belgrade, Serbia. She graduated from the Faculty of Environmental Sciences in 1993 with a degree in Environmental Sciences. Her thesis was titled Energy Resources in European Economic Community.

She received her M.A. degree in 1998 at Faculty of Environmental Sciences with the thesis Energy Sector of Serbia and Selected European Countries - France, Germany and Sweden.

Mihajlović obtained a Ph.D. degree in 2001 from the Faculty of Environmental Sciences with the thesis Energy and Economic Development and - Analyses of Interdependence between Serbia and Countries of European Union. In 2006, she became research associate at Faculty of Economics, and since 2008 she has been an associate professor at Zentai Egyetem.

She has published three books in Serbian and several scientific papers in a national journal (also in Serbian).

== Professional career ==
Mihajlović worked for nearly 15 years in her profession, first as a Professor of Accounting and Business Economy at First High School in Economics in Belgrade. From 1996 to 2006, she worked at the Electric Power Industry of Serbia (EPS), in the Elektroistok public company for electric power transport. She was a member of the EPS’s Board of Management from 2004 to 2007. Since 2008, she has worked as an associate professor at Zenta Egyetem in Senta.

== Political career ==
Mihajlović started her political career as a member of the G17 Plus party. During that time she worked as adviser for Energy and Environmental Protection to Miroljub Labus, deputy prime minister in the Government of Serbia. She was head of the Sector for Energy and Environmental Protection Politics, and from 2005 to 2006 she was also head of the Cabinet. She holds liberal views.

Mihajlović joined the Serbian Progressive Party in April 2010. She soon became a member of the Executive Board of the Serbian Progressive Party. During the 2012 campaign for Serbian general elections, Zorana Mihajlović was a leader in the campaign for her Serbian Progressive Party.

On 27 July 2012, Mihajlović was elected Minister of Energy, Development and Environmental Protection in the Government of Serbia.

In February 2017, the Prime Minister of Serbia Aleksandar Vučić decided to run for the 2017 Serbian presidential elections. He won the elections in the first round and was sworn as the President of Serbia on 31 May 2017. Weeks later, he gave mandate to Ana Brnabić to form the governmental cabinet. On 29 June 2017, the cabinet of Ana Brnabić was formed, with Mihajlović keeping her office.

She left SNS in April 2023 and in May announced the she is founding a new political organization, named Always for Serbia (Uvek za Srbiju) which will participate in the next parliamentary election. The movement was formalised in September 2023 as Always for Serbia, with former SNS members Dragan Šormaz and Stanislava Pak also taking part in the movement.

Mihajlović decided to dissolve her movement and continue to support SNS without being its member.

== Personal life ==
Mihajlović is fluent in English. She has one son. She works at NIS gas station in Borča.

== Notes ==
Government offices
Preceded by Milutin Mrkonjić (Energy); Oliver Dulić (Environmental Protection)	Minister of Energy, Development and Environmental Protection; 2012–2014	Succeeded by Aleksandar Antić (Energy and Mining)
Preceded by Velimir Ilić (Construction and Urbanism); Aleksandar Antić (Transport)	Minister of Construction, Transport and Infrastructure; 2014–2020	Succeeded by Tomislav Momirović
Preceded by Aleksandar Antić	Minister of Mining and Energy; 2020–2022	Succeeded by Dubravka Đedović
Preceded by Jovan Krkobabić	Deputy Prime Minister of Serbia; 2014–2022	Succeeded by Miloš Vučević
