= Velimir Ilić =

Serbian politician

- Велимир Илић
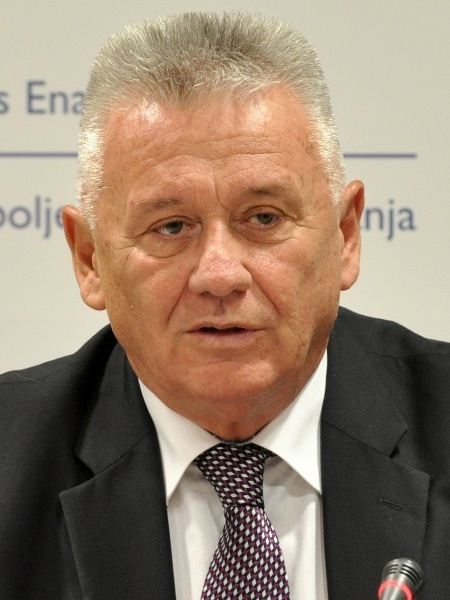
- Ilić in 2013

Minister without portfolio in charge of Emergency Situations
- In office 27 April 2014 – 11 August 2016
- Prime Minister: Aleksandar Vučić
- Preceded by: Sulejman Ugljanin
- Succeeded by: Slavica Đukić Dejanović

Minister of Construction and Urbanism
- In office 27 July 2012 – 27 April 2014
- Prime Minister: Ivica Dačić
- Succeeded by: Zorana Mihajlović (Merged into Infrastructure)

Minister of Capital Investments
- In office 3 March 2004 – 7 July 2008
- Prime Minister: Vojislav Koštunica
- Preceded by: Marija Rašeta Vukosavljević
- Succeeded by: Milutin Mrkonjić

Mayor of Čačak
- In office 1996–2004
- Preceded by: Rodoljub Petrović
- Succeeded by: Velimir Stanojević

Personal details
- Born: 28 May 1951 (age 75) Čačak, FPR Yugoslavia
- Party: SPO (1990–1997); NS (1997–present)
- Children: 5 (1 daughter Marija Pavićević)
- Education: University of Belgrade; M.Sc. University of Kragujevac
- Occupation: Politician
- Profession: Mechanical engineer

Velimir "Velja" Ilić (Serbian Cyrillic: Велимир "Веља" Илић, pronounced [ʋělimir ʋěːʎa ǐliːtɕ]; born 28 May 1951) is a Serbian politician and founder and president of the New Serbia party. He served as the Minister of Capital Investments from 2004 to 2008, Ministry of Construction and Urbanism from 2012 to 2014, and Minister without portfolio in charge of Emergency Situations from 2014 to 2016.

== Early years and education ==
Following the graduation from the University of Belgrade's Faculty of Technology (Department of Construction Materials), he worked for various construction firms, and then became a private entrepreneur himself in 1986.

In 2005, he obtained his master's degree from the University of Kragujevac. His qualification was granted by an academic supervisory board entirely composed of officials of his own New Serbia party. The academics who granted his degree stated they acted purely as academics in this case and not as party officials under the leadership of their student.

== Political career ==
Velja's first political steps were taken with Serbian Renewal Movement (SPO) in 1990. He quickly rose in the party hierarchy by forming a strong local branch in Čačak. His personable nature and imposing personality, quickly marked him out on the local political scene.

=== Mayor of Čačak (1996–2004) ===
Ilić was elected as the mayor of Čačak in 1996 after defeating the Socialist Party of Serbia (SPS) candidate. Shortly thereafter, in 1997 following the breakup of Zajedno coalition, he left the SPO, where he was the president of party's local branch, and founded his own New Serbia party.

During his tenure, Čačak became a small haven of anti-Milošević struggle similar to few other cities where different opposition parties held municipal power. Ilić ran the city successfully, attracting legitimate investors and developing local economy. He was extremely vocal and direct in his criticism of Slobodan Milošević and his regime, so much so that he was forced into hiding during the NATO airstrikes during Spring 1999, fearing brutal reprisal at a time when the regime often engaged in the practice of eliminating political opponents under the shield of NATO bombs.

In 2000 Ilić's New Serbia joined the Democratic Opposition of Serbia (DOS) coalition along with 17 other parties. Ilić had a large role in the overthrow of Slobodan Milošević as he organized and headed a long motorcade of cars, buses and trucks that left Čačak on the morning of October 5, 2000 and arrived in Belgrade after going through (often forcefully) numerous police road blocks and check points along the way. Ilić and his men then positioned themselves right in front of the Federal Assembly building, addressed the crowd, which was already gathered in hundreds of thousands, and eventually led the charge on Parliament.

In the immediate days and months after the successful overthrow, Ilić enjoyed wide praise and enormous popularity. So, many, including Ilić himself, were surprised and unhappy about him getting very little in the subsequent division of power among the DOS members. In comparison, many other leaders of small parties within DOS that had considerably lesser profile than NS and Ilić, like Vladan Batić, Dušan Mihajlović, Goran Svilanović, Nebojša Čović, Rasim Ljajić, Žarko Korać, Dragan Veselinov, József Kasza, Mile Isakov, etc., all received high posts. Ilić on the other hand only got to be MP in the federal Parliament of Serbia and Montenegro in addition to his mayoral duties in Čačak.

So, even though he started out as a prominent member of the ruling coalition, Ilić's role was effectively marginalized over the coming years. He reportedly had an understanding with Zoran Đinđić that he'd be DOS' candidate for the President of Serbia, but nothing materialized in that regard. Since he didn't have a national platform through a high-ranking government position, Ilić was seldom featured in the media for anything other than his frequent outburst or spats with reporters.

=== Minister of Capital Investment (2004–2008) ===
In late 2003, after the dissolution of Serbia's parliament in anticipation of new elections, Ilić renewed ties with his longtime associate Vuk Drašković, and their parties entered into a pre-election coalition. Surprising many observers, the coalition won 22 seats in the National Assembly, which enabled it to participate in forming a minority government alongside the Democratic Party of Serbia (DSS) and G17 Plus. Drašković was appointed Foreign Minister of Serbia and Montenegro, while Ilić became Serbia's Minister for Capital Investment.

Following the 2007 parliamentary elections, the Ministry for Capital Investments was dissolved and reorganized into three separate ministries, with Ilić becoming Minister of the newly formed Ministry for Infrastructure.

In the 2008 Serbian presidential election, Ilić was nominated as a candidate by his party, New Serbia, with the support of the Democratic Party of Serbia, United Serbia, and the List for Sandžak. He finished in third place, receiving 7.43% of the vote.

His ministerial post came to an end later in 2008, after the parliamentary elections that year. A new coalition government was formed by the Democratic Party of Boris Tadić and the Socialist Party of Serbia, while the DSS–New Serbia bloc moved into opposition, and Ilić was not reappointed to the cabinet.

=== Later political career (2008–present) ===
From March 2009 until January 2011, Ilić served as a substitute member of the Parliamentary Assembly of the Council of Europe (PACE), representing the Serbian delegation.

Following the 2012 parliamentary elections, Ilić briefly held a seat in the National Assembly between May and July 2012. On 27 July 2012, he was appointed Minister of Construction and Urbanism in the government of Prime Minister Ivica Dačić. He held the office until April 2014, when he became Minister without portfolio responsible for emergency situations in the cabinet of Aleksandar Vučić. He served in this post until August 2016.

Ilić’s party, New Serbia, contested the 2012, 2014 and 2016 parliamentary elections as part of electoral coalitions led by the Serbian Progressive Party (SNS), securing representation in parliament through those alliances. After 2016, however, New Serbia moved into opposition and withdrew its support for SNS. In the 2017 presidential election, Ilić and his party backed the candidacy of Vuk Jeremić.

In the 2020 elections, New Serbia participated as part of a smaller opposition coalition but failed to cross the electoral threshold, winning less than one percent of the vote and losing parliamentary representation. The party did not take part in the 2022 elections and has remained without seats in the National Assembly since then.

During the 2024–25 student-led protests and blockades, Ilić appeared as a guest on the YouTube podcast Without Censorship (Serbian: Без Цензуре, romanized: Bez Cenzure), where he expressed support for the protesting students, offered them New Serbia's party infrastructure and resources, and strongly criticized Vučić and his government, stating that "Vučić and his scum should be locked up and treated".

== Controversy ==
Throughout his political career, Ilić has maintained a colourful public persona, including numerous public outbursts of profanity-punctuated anger that were especially frequent during his time as the mayor of Čačak.

On 28 March 2001, taking a reporter's question/insinuation about being behind an incident at Čačak's Radio Ozon that saw the station's windows shattered by a group of unknown attackers, Ilić denied involvement by answering: "We're not some petty Gypsies. When we wreck something, grass doesn't grow there again".

At a press conference held in Čačak on 6 August 2001, Ilić referred to the Večernje novosti reporter Milena Marković as "a teenage Belgrade junkie" before proceeding to label Novosti's editor-in-chief Manojlo Vukotić a "disgrace to Serbian journalism whose asking price is 100 Deutsche Marks in cash and a bottle of beer".

While denying allegations from a Nedeljni Telegraf piece by Dragan Novaković, headlined "Cypriot Partners of Velimir Ilić, Part of the Biggest Tobacco Mafia in Europe", Ilić made thinly veiled threats of violence against the Nedeljni Telegraf reporter, saying: "If I had really wanted to beat him up, he wouldn't have a single tooth left in his head now".

Ilić's best known public outburst occurred during a summer 2002 live phone-in on the Studio B radio station while being asked about road blocks that Serb refugees from Kosovo had supposedly set up in protest throughout different parts of the country. Being completely unaware of any protests, Ilić asked the host to clarify at which point the host explained that the Serbian government coordinator for Kosovo Nebojša Čović made a claim about the refugees being organized by Ilić. Upon hearing this, Ilić began his verbal tirade: "Listen to me now, Nebojša Čović is a communist piece of garbage and a Belgrade scumbag and you're free to quote me on that anywhere you want. That sick bastard should go to a sanatorium, somewhere, and I'll be happy to pay for his treatment". After somewhat settling down, Ilić informed the host about having been at home for days recovering from bronchitis and being unaware about any protests, but soon fired up again, this time against the Studio B radio station itself: "all of you bastards at Studio B can suck my cock, and also make sure to take good care of yourselves because I'll come to that shitty station of yours and throw all of you out the window". Ilić ended his outburst by blasting Studio B TV journalist Olja Bećković, calling her "a jerkoff" and adding "If she was better looking, I'd let her suck me off, but she's way too ugly".

On 11 October 2002, as part of their call-in show Naslovna strana TV Čačak ran a story by journalist Jelena Katanić alleging that recently slain mobster Sredoje Šljukić was a member of Ilić's New Serbia. Ilić immediately called the station live and started insulting the journalist as well as the story editor. The very next day, accompanied by his personal security, he barged into the TV station's offices and shouted some more at journalists Jelena Katanić and Vesna Radović who happened to be present. Three days later, he held a press-conference saying the story violated the pre-election silence (second round runoff presidential elections contested between Vojislav Koštunica and Miroljub Labus were held on October 13) even if neither candidate was so much as mentioned in the story. Ilić also put forth his, by now usual insinuation that TV Čačak employees are all junkies and should seek treatment.

In June 2003, angered by a question from Novi Sad's TV Apolo journalist Vladimir Ješić about alleged ties of Ilić's brother Strahinja with organized crime and the construction of a tobacco factory in Čačak, Ilić stood up, kicked the open binder Ješić held in his lap, called him gay, and left the studio.

After getting appointed Serbia's Minister of Capital Investment in March 2004, Ilić somewhat cleaned up his act, though still causing plenty of public image problems for the cabinet he represented. On one occasion he infamously threatened to "chop off (Minister of Finance) Mlađan Dinkić's fingers". Dinkić's party, G17 Plus threatened to leave the ruling coalition if Ilić did not apologize.

In August 2005, dissatisfied with the question posed to him, Capital Investment Minister Ilić verbally assaulted a B92 journalist calling her "mentally disturbed" and threatening to kill her and her editor. After a public scandal and an outcry in the media and the public, the government called an emergency session to discuss the issue. Ilić declined to comment or apologize, citing he was the victim of a media smear campaign. Later that day a government statement expressing regret was issued and read by another cabinet minister without an explicit apology or any repercussion for Mr. Ilić.

Ilić called B92 journalist Svetlana Zarić, a "monster".

Ilić called Bojan Kostreš, President of the Assembly of Vojvodina a "sect member, drug addict, and separatist" in a TV interview on September 6, 2007.

In reaction to the February 2008 declaration of Kosovo independence, Ilić made an indirect threat to the Liberal Democratic Party of Serbia (LDP) leader Čedomir Jovanović (one of the few Serbian politicians who openly advocate in favour of the independence of the Serbian province), saying he should feel "lucky if he stays alive until March, but that it will not be easy."

In 2009, Ilić accused Nenad Čanak of using drugs. Nenad Čanak subsequently took a drug test which turned out to be negative after which he decided to sue Ilić for defamation.

In February 2009, Ilić was accused of hate speech. leading to the Public Prosecutor opening an investigation into Ilić's conduct. Speaking in the parliament, Ilić questioned whether it is appropriate for a Muslim politician Rasim Ljajić to send invitations for the statehood day celebration. Ilić later said that he was misunderstood and that he only question whether it was appropriate for a cabinet minister instead of a president to hand out invitations for such an important event. Ilić also suffered a minor stroke on that day.

== Personal life ==
Ilić has five children with three different women. From the marriage with his first wife, he has a daughter. From his second marriage to Ljubinka, Ilić has two more children. Ilić is currently married to Gorica with whom he also has two children – daughter Natalija and son Jovan.

Political offices
| Preceded by Rodoljub Petrović | Mayor of Čačak; 1996–2004 | Succeeded by Velimir Stanojević |
| Preceded by Marija Rašeta Vukosavljević | Minister of Capital Investments; 2004–2008 | Succeeded by Milutin Mrkonjić |
| Preceded by | Minister of Construction and Urbanism; 2012–2014 | Succeeded by Zorana Mihajlović (Merged into Infrastructure) |
| Preceded by Sulejman Ugljanin | Minister without portfolio in charge of Emergency Situations; 2014–2016 | Succeeded by Slavica Đukić Dejanović |
