= 2020–2022 Serbian protests =

Civil conflict in Serbia

- Part of the protests over responses to the COVID-19 pandemic
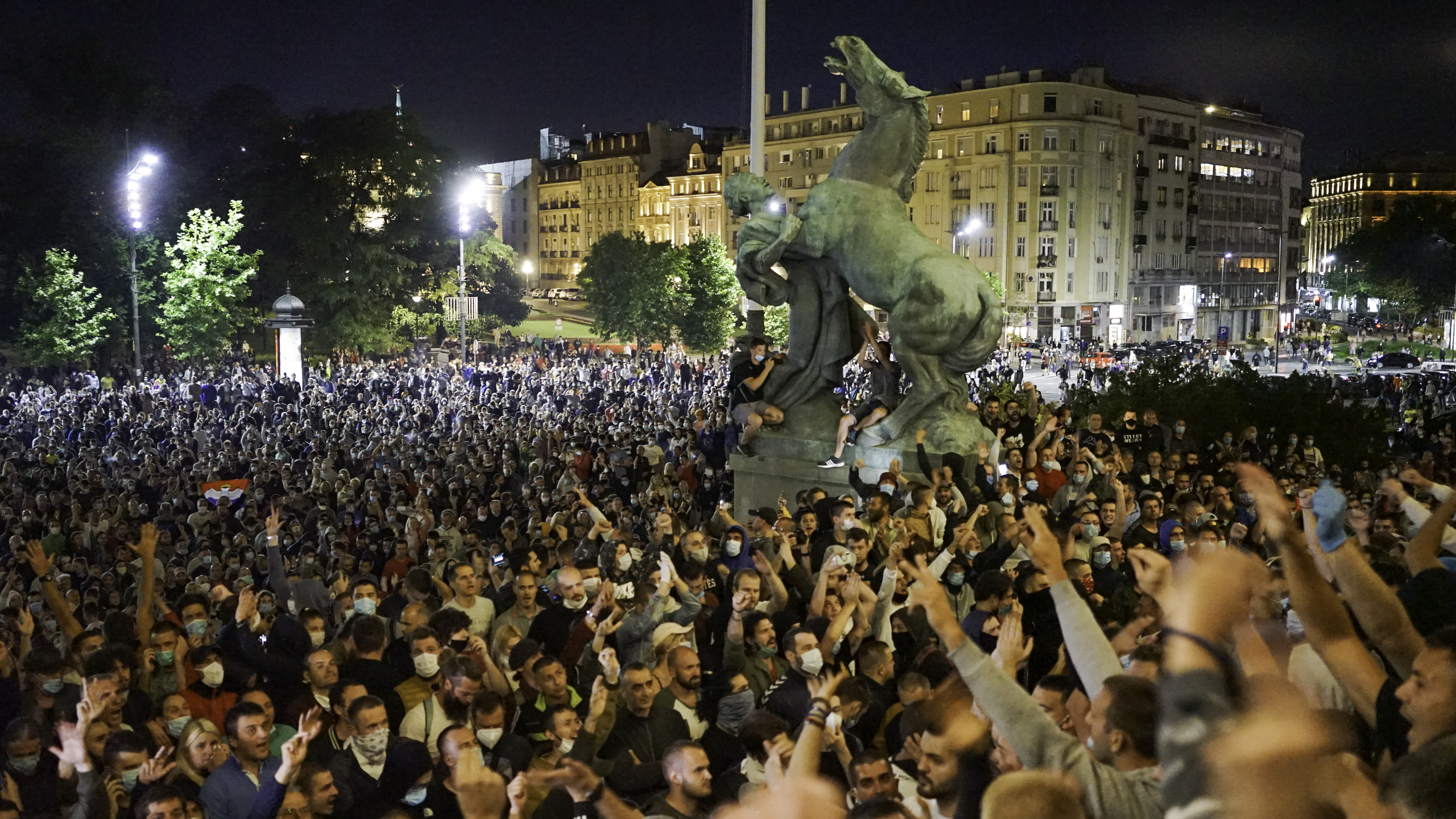
- Protest in Belgrade on 7 July 2020
- Date: 7 – 18 July 2020 (main events); 18 July 2020 – 26 November 2021 (sporadic protests); 27 November 2021 – 15 February 2022 (escalation of protests and roadblocks)
- Location: around the Nikola Pašić Square, Belgrade Shortly after protests spread to following cities: Novi Sad; Niš; Smederevo; Kragujevac; Kruševac; Kraljevo; Čačak; Zrenjanin; Vranje; Protests also spread to Serbian diaspora in following cities: New York; Boston; Vancouver; London; Paris; Berlin; Hamburg; Prague; Amsterdam; Brussels; Zürich; Stockholm; Helsinki; Oslo; Luxembourg; Vienna
- Caused by: Planned re-establishment of a curfew for the weekend in Belgrade; Perceived mismanagement of the COVID-19 pandemic by the government; Alleged faking of the true numbers of newly infected and deaths, separated databases for the government and the public; Erosion of the state of democracy and democratic institutions, president Vučić's authoritarian grip on power; Police brutality
- Goals: Cancel planned curfew; Replacement of members of the Serbian Government's COVID-19 Crisis Team; New parliamentary elections; Resignation of the Serbian Government and president; Release of arrested protesters; Withdrawal of expropriation and referendum laws; Rejection of Rio Tinto's investment
- Methods: Protests, political activism, civil disobedience, sit-ins, roadblock
- Result: Protests failed: The protests ended; some of the protesters' demands were met.; Most of the opposition political parties participating in the protest entered parliament after the 2022 general elections.
- Concessions: Planned reintroduction of curfew canceled; 10 arrested protesters released; Expropriation law withdrawn; Referendum law amended

Parties
Anti-government protesters: Locals; Students; Nationalists; Sovereignists; Environmental movement; Citizens; Opposition parties: United Opposition of Serbia; Do not let Belgrade drown; Dveri; Enough is Enough	Government of Serbia; Security Intelligence Agency; Police of Serbia; Gendarmery; Special Anti-Terrorist Unit; Government parties: Serbian Progressive Party-led coalition; Socialist Party of Serbia; Leviathan Movement

Lead figures
Dragan Đilas; Boško Obradović; Dobrica Veselinović; Aleksandar Jovanović Ćuta	Aleksandar Vučić (Serbia) Ana Brnabić (Serbia) Aleksandar Vulin (Serbia) Nebojša Stefanović (Serbia) Ivica Dačić (Serbia) Zorana Mihajlović

Number
Tens of thousands	Unknown

Casualties and losses
76+ protesters and 4 journalists injured 223+ arrests 1 death (non-violent)	118+ policemen and 3 police horses injured 6 police vehicles destroyed

Casualties
- Damage: 30 million Serbian dinars worth of damage in Belgrade according to the government

On 7 July 2020, a series of protests and riots began over the government announcement of the reimplementation of the curfew and the government's allegedly poor handling of the COVID-19 situation, as well as being a partial continuation of the "One of Five Million" movement. The initial demand of the protesters had been to cancel the planned reintroduction of curfew in Serbia during July, which was successfully achieved in less than 48 hours of the protest. The protesters also demanded a more technical response to the COVID-19 crisis and more factual and constructive information about the ongoing medical situation. Among other causes, the protests were driven by the crisis of democratic institutions under Aleksandar Vučić's rule and the growing concern that the president was concentrating all powers in his hands at the expense of the parliament.

== Background ==
=== COVID-19 pandemic mismanagement ===
On 7 July 2020, the day when protests began, Serbia saw its deadliest day yet during the COVID-19 pandemic in Serbia with 13 deaths. President Vučić said that the situation in the capital city was alarming, and announcedthat he was banning gatherings of more than five people and imposing a curfew from Friday 18:00 to Monday 5:00 local time.

The Serbian Government has been accused of hiding true numbers of people infected and deaths from COVID-19. BIRN's research showed that in the period from 19 March to 1 June 2020, a total of 632 people died in Serbia who had tested positive for COVID-19 which is more than twice as many as the officially announced number of 244 deaths in that period. BIRN has learned that by analysing data obtained from the state's COVID-19 information system. The President has been accused of lifting the lockdown too early in order to hold parliamentary elections in which his party won by a landslide.

During this period, large parties, sport events and gatherings happened and greatly increased the number of infected individuals. A big sport event was also held, a football game between Red Star and Partizan with tens of thousands people attending. A leading specialist in the COVID-19 Crisis Team, closely related to the ruling party in money schemes, has said that the sport events were not an epidemiological risk because "tickets were sold online" even though thousands attended without practising social distancing measures or wearing masks. After those events, Danas newspaper called for Serbian Government COVID-19 Crisis Team "to wake up from hibernation" and ban large gatherings. Serbian Government COVID-19 Crisis Team started consideration of reinforcement of COVID-19 measures one day after elections.

=== Election fraud allegations ===
The leader of the opposition party Enough is Enough, Saša Radulović, has accused the ruling SNS of election fraud and said that numerous irregularities were recorded. Radulović has said the Republic Electoral Commission (RIK) has repeatedly ignored the evidence of irregularities his party submitted and accused them of working in the ruling party's interest.

His movement had submitted 2,700 complaints and on 30 June, Radulović told the media the Administrative Court had formally accepted 175 complaints his party had submitted, saying that the voting must, therefore, be repeated in 2700 polling stations which makes one-third of all polling stations. He had accused the Electoral Commission of not observing the proper procedures while counting votes, stating that the ballot box content was not checked and the voting results were determined solely on the basis of ballot paper account forms.

Radulović has supported the protests and stated that his party's goal is to invalidate the election results and call for fresh elections. He has said that the goal of the protest should be to force the government to organise new elections.

He has submitted pleas to the Constitutional Court of Serbia and has threatened to file a report to the European Court of Human Rights if the Serbian courts don't overthrow the elections. Rule of law and the independence of the judiciary is seriously hindered, as assessed by the European Commission Report for Serbia 2019.

== Timeline ==
=== 7 July 2020 ===
==== Belgrade ====
Locals, students, and members of the Do not let Belgrade d(r)own gathered in front of the National Assembly and peacefully protested. Many of them wore masks and observed social distancing rules. Just before 20:30, protesters started throwing rocks and bottles at the police, few torches were thrown, as well. Around 22:00, a large group stormed National Assembly building involving nationalists and anti-vaccine campaigner Srđan Nogo. As they entered the building, they shouted "Serbia has risen". Clashes occurred inside the building for 15 minutes. Around 22:15, police managed to completely clear the building but clashes continued outside as police fired tear gas and used batons against protesters. Violent protests continued during the whole night. At least 24 people were injured. The protesters refused to withdraw and police brought in reinforcements during that night, many wearing riot shields, some with service dogs or on horses. The violence lasted until 03:00 in the morning, with police accused of using excessive force towards the protesters. During the live coverage, the regional TV channel N1 captured three police special force units in riot gear hitting three young men who were sitting on a bench with batons.

==== Kragujevac ====
Protesters peacefully marched through the city; no police were present.

=== 8 July 2020 ===
==== Belgrade ====
Protesters gathered in the evening on the same place as yesterday, and violence continued between police and protesters. This time, police were reinforced by police cavalry and Gendarmery. During clashes with police, leader of Dveri Boško Obradović, was injured by the police. Who afterward said: "You can fight your people every day, it will be more of us, people won't stand this". He also called for Gendarmery to throw their shields and side with protesters. Sergej Trifunović, leader of the Movement of Free Citizens, tried to join the protests but he was pushed out by protesters and forced to leave. He left after he was attacked by protesters and suffered a blow to the head. Protesters tried to occupy the National Assembly building again but this time were stopped by the Gendarmery and police cavalry. After failing to occupy the National Assembly building, protesters marched through the center of Belgrade, and clashes with police continued. Protesters also set police vehicles on fire.

==== Novi Sad ====
Thousands of protesters gathered around 18:00 in Novi Sad, where they demanded the resignation of the Serbian Government and president, as well as health officials and other members of the COVID-19 Crisis Management Group. Protesters demolished premises of the Serbian Progressive Party, broke window on RTV premise, and set the entrance to the City Hall on fire. Person who broke the window on RTV premise cut his leg while breaking the window. Protesters also damaged a nearby McDonald's restaurant. Protesters broke windows at the city hall and threw Molotov cocktails and firecrackers through the broken windows. Police arrived on 22:00 when most of the damage was already done and most of the protesters left, the remaining protesters threw cans at police while police fired tear gas.

==== Niš ====
Protesters gathered at 19:00 and peacefully marched through the city. The protesters threw stones at the local SNS headquarters and tore down SNS posters, and threw eggs at the Vučić election poster.

==== Kragujevac ====
Protests in Kragujevac were peaceful until 22:00 when protesters threw eggs and cans on police, they afterward broke the window of the town hall and threw a torch through the broken window. Police fired tear gas at protesters after this. Soon afterwards most of the protesters left.

==== Smederevo ====
Protesters peacefully marched through the city and tore down one billboard of Aleksandar Vučić.

=== 9 July 2020 ===
On 9 July, sit-ins were held in Belgrade, Novi Sad, Niš, Pančevo, Kragujevac, Smederevo, Kruševac, Čačak, Kraljevo, Vranje, Zrenjanin, Leskovac, Bor and Vršac. Some protesters called for a sit-in and for protesters to wear white t-shirts to represent opposition to recent violence on the protests, this call was accepted by most of the protesters. Protest was also attended by doctors from COVID-19 hospitals who demanded better handling of pandemic.

In Belgrade, thousands protesters sat in front of the National Assembly. At one point during the protest one group of right-wing protesters called others to stand up and fight which caused a minor clash between protesters, no one was injured and protests remained peaceful for the rest of the evening. A gendarmary officer was filmed setting a trash dumpster on fire, something which was heavily blamed on the protesters for "destroying city property". Protest ended around 1 am.

In Vranje, where around 100–120 citizens gathered, protesters tore down all SNS election posters.

=== 10 July 2020 ===
In Belgrade, one protester stabbed another protester with a knife after a verbal confrontation between two groups of protesters. Excluding this incident protest remained peaceful until 9 pm when a group of right-wing protesters tried to break inside a National Assembly using firecrackers, they only managed to shatter glass on the main entrance before police intervened. Protesters clashed with the law enforcement for around 40 minutes, after the clashes ended peaceful protest continued. Around 11 pm clashes again erupted between police and protesters, police was reinforced by the gendarmery. Police and gendarmary fired tear gas and pushed protesters away from the National Assembly in three different directions in order to disperse them, which turned out to be successful. At least 19 people were injured, including both protesters and law enforcement officers, and more than 70 more protesters were arrested, including a protester who stabbed another protester with a knife.

In Novi Sad, protesters blockaded multiple roads in the city. Around 8 pm they marched out of the city and blockaded E75 highway, protests remained peaceful.

In Zrenjanin, protesters blockaded bridge on the main road of the city, protest finished without incidents.

Peaceful protests were also held in Niš, Pirot, Vranje, Kruševac, Leskovac and Čačak.

=== 11 July 2020 ===
Protests in cities across Serbia were peaceful. In Belgrade many protesters paid their respects to Ljubisav Đokić, better known by his nickname "Joe the Bulldozer Driver", who was part of protests in previous days and had died earlier that day. Antonije Davidović, a radical political activist and a former monk who was excommunicated from the Serbian Orthodox Church, made a speech in which he called for protesters to take off their masks, after which many of protesters left. Around 12:30 am, the police violently chased off and arrested several remaining peaceful protesters in front of the National Assembly in Belgrade. The same day in Niš, protesters gave the police a handful of flowers and the Serbian flag. Peaceful protests occurred throughout Serbia.

=== 12 July 2020 ===
Peaceful protest marches were held in Belgrade, Niš, Novi Sad, and Zrenjanin. Protests were attended by fewer people compared to previous days, police was present but there were no interventions.

Protests by Serbian diaspora started in New York.

=== 13 July 2020 ===
Peaceful protests were held in Belgrade, Niš, Čačak, Zrenjanin, Novi Sad, and Kruševac.

In Belgrade two separate protests were held, one in front of the National Assembly and one in front of Belgrade central prison.

On protest in front of National Assembly protesters split in three groups; supporters of Srđan Nogo, supporters of Enough is Enough party, and a third group who kept distance from other two groups. Srđan Nogo presented his demands which were the following: release of all arrested protesters, stopping of all legal procedures against protesters, stopping of government formation according to 2020 election, introduction of accountability for all politicians by giving a single statement guaranteeing the implementation of their political program, creation of technical government which would be in power for one year, introduction of daily political debates on state media, and arrest of COVID-19 crisis staff members for their poor handling of pandemic. Leader of Enough is Enough party, Saša Radulović also presented his sole demand: impeachment of 2020 election. The third group of protesters was leaderless and gave no demands.

On protest in front of central prison two opposition parties were present: Democratic Party and Don't let Belgrade d(r)own. Protesters demanded release of all arrested protesters, as well as decrease in police funding in favour of increasing healthcare budget.

=== 14 July 2020 ===
Protests were held in several cities across Serbia. In Belgrade two separate protests were held again on the same locations as protests on 13 July. In front of National Assembly protesters were again split, this time one new group emerged which was led Antonije Davidović, he and his supporters sung religious songs about Kosovo. After protest in front of central prison on 13 July ten protesters were released from prison, protest in front of central prison was again held with goal of all protesters being released.

Several organisations sued Serbian law enforcement for use of excessive force on protests, urgent appeal was sent to United Nations Special Rapporteur on Torture and Other Cruel, Inhuman or Degrading Treatment or Punishment.

=== 15 July 2020 ===
Protests were held in several cities across Serbia but with least people present since the beginning. Protests in Serbian diaspora started in more countries.

=== 16 July 2020 ===
Peaceful protests were held in front of National Assembly in Belgrade and main police station in Novi Sad.

=== 17 July 2020 ===
Peaceful protest was held in Belgrade, protesters demanded clarification of allegations that 7 police dogs died of poisoning by tear gas during the riots, police denied the allegations.

Petition for punishment of those responsible for use of excessive force on protests by the law enforcement which was sent to United Nations Special Rapporteur on Torture and Other Cruel, Inhuman or Degrading Treatment or Punishment and European Union reached 4000 signatures.

=== 18 July 2020 ===
Protest was held in Belgrade, it ended without incidents.

=== Protest against the constitution of a new assembly 3 August 2020 ===
The last major protest occurred in Belgrade in front of the Parliament building while the new members of the parliament were being sworn in. During that day, protest leader Srđan Nogo and one of his followers were arrested by the police and charged with inciting sedition under article 309 of the Criminal Code of Serbia. A video of Antonije Davidović throwing eggs on the Parliament building while wearing a Christian cassock went viral, with many media outlets pointing out that Davidović is not really a priest nor a member of any recognised church or religious organisation in Serbia.

== Peaceful protests ==
=== Social protests ===
==== 24 September 2020 ====
Students gathered around the initiatives "Let's protect students" protested on 24 September 2020 on the plateau in front of the Rectorate of the University of Belgrade, demanding the reduction of schools due to the economic consequences of the corona epidemic.

==== 29 September 2020 ====
Professors, associates and students of the Faculty of Philology demanded an urgent scheduling of the sessions of the Scientific-Teaching Century at the protest on the Plateau in front of the Faculty of Philosophy on 29 September, at which the proposal for a new dean will be voted on. Leon Cohen, a professor at the Faculty of Philosophy, who is one of the signatories of the letter to his shocking colleagues from the Faculty of Philology, said that he was protesting that such an act would affect the autonomy of the university, and that no matter what he did, he would set an example at the Faculty of Philology. Professor of the Faculty of Philology Iva Draškić Vićanović said that for the first time since 2006, several faculty commissions and bodies that calculated for the election of the dean of that faculty, scheduled for 21 September, were trained at that faculty. The students were addressed by actors Svetlana Bojković and Milan Mihajlović.

==== 5 October 2020 ====
Students organised a protest in front of Ministry of Education headquarters after not being met with assistant minister of education, despite being promised a meeting with him. Nemanjina Street was blockaded for 3 hours by the protesters.

==== 2–26 December 2020 ====
Between 2 and 26 December 2020 owners and workers of small businesses held several protests in front of ministry of finance demanding financial help, they received no response.

During the protest on 26 December one protester got sick and fell on the ground, another protester tried to help him until ambulance arrived, he died while in an ambulance vehicle. Protest was ended early and further protests weren't held after this event.

=== Freelancer protests ===
==== 30 December 2020 ====
On 30 December, several hundred members of the Association of Internet Workers held a protest in front of the building of the Ministry of Finance and the Government of Serbia, because the Tax Administration sent more than 2,000 "requests for control" to those who earn money from that job. The gathered people carried banners that read, among other things: "Debt slavery for our children", "Do not destroy freelancers", "The center of corruption is the government", "Tax - yes". Harach - no.

==== 16 January 2021 ====
Internet workers and other freelancers protested in Belgrade on 16 January 2021, asking the state to abandon the measures by which they were retroactively taxed five years ago. After the protest in front of the Assembly of Serbia, they walked through the central city streets to the building of the Government of Serbia, and then to Trg Slavija.

A representative of the Association of Workers on the Internet, which organized the protest, Miran Pogacar, said that during the protest, an invitation arrived from the office of Prime Minister Ana Brnabic to come to the Government on Monday, 18 January, to start negotiations.

==== 7 – 10 April 2021 ====
Freelancers began a protest in front of the National Assembly on 7 April by setting up tents and announced that they would camp there for the next three days, dissatisfied with the new proposal of the Government of Serbia on amendments to the Law on Personal Income Tax, which regulates their position. They asked the Government of Serbia to withdraw the proposal on changes to that law and to sit down with the freelancers at the table again in order to find a compromise solution that would suit both the state and the workers on the Internet and regulate their position. They are asking the Government of Serbia to withdraw the proposal on changes to that law and to sit at the table again with freelancers in order to find a compromise solution that will suit both the state and workers on the Internet. The protest walk of freelancers organized by the Association of Workers on the Internet was held the next day with the message that they should not give up their demands for resolving the issue of tax collection. In front of the National Assembly, they reiterated their request to withdraw the amendments to the Law on Personal Income Tax from the procedure and to sit at the negotiating table with the representatives of the Government of Serbia. The president of the Association of Internet Workers, Miran Pogačar, told Tanjug that freelancers will stay in front of the Assembly for three days, that they would hold a protest the next day at 11 am, and that he would join the "Ecological Revolt" protest announced for Saturday, 10 April. A protest called "Ecological Uprising" was organized in front of the Serbian Parliament on Saturday, 10 April, at which the authorities are asked to respect the Constitution and existing laws and harmonize regulations with the highest environmental standards, with equal participation of citizens and non-governmental organizations. The gathered people went on a protest walk towards the Government, and then towards RTS. The gathering "Ecological Uprising" started around 13:20, with a band with percussion instruments, and then the representatives of the Association "Let's Defend the Rivers of Stara Planina" came on stage and took out the state flag, and a song about Stara Planina was broadcast from the sound system. On the plateau in front of the parliament, where the stage is set, on the street and in Pionirski Park, a large number of people gathered with banners with, among other things, the messages: "I'm afraid to breathe", "Rivers save because water is worth", "I carry black for all victims of pollution "," We have given you pensions, we will not give you air and rivers", "I want to breathe".

=== Protests against vaccination in 2020/21 ===
==== 7 September 2020 ====
A group of citizens gathered at noon on 7 September in front of the "Trampoline" Institute to protest against, as they say, the announced trials of vaccines against the corona virus. The protest came after the Reuters news agency reported two days earlier that Serbia, together with Pakistan and two other countries, had agreed to participate in the testing of the corona virus vaccine produced by the Chinese company CNBG. Minister of Health Zlatibor Lončar denied, saying that the conditions for such testing to be done in the country have not been met, saying that the officials will be the ones who will appear before the public if something like that happens. The protest was led by Dr. Jovana Stojković, who told the gathered that the Minister of Education announced that the children would be taken away from their parents if they were not vaccinated, so the gathered people carried banners such as "We will not give you children". Stojković connects vaccines with billionaire Bill Gates and claims that there is no evidence that vaccines are safe and that they can cause serious side effects. They also gathered against the announcement that children who will have symptoms of the corona virus during their stay at school will be tested without the consent of their parents. There were several members of the MUP around the "Trampoline" building, the protest was peaceful and rarely any of the participants wore protective masks.

==== 10 October 2020 ====
On 10 October, parents of missing babies held a protest rally in Belgrade's Republic Square with the aim of once again drawing public attention to the fate of children, who they believe were abducted at birth and then sold or given up for adoption. They also gathered to call on the competent institutions in Serbia to shed light on the circumstances under which their children disappeared. The Law on Determining the Facts on the Status of Newborn Children, which is suspected to have disappeared from a maternity hospital in Serbia, entered into force on 11 March 2020, and Article 17 stipulates that the deadline for initiating court proceedings is six months from the date of entry. to force. The main objections raised by the parents to the law are that it offers parents monetary compensation, instead of answering the question of what happened to their children. The Protector of Citizens of Serbia, Zoran Pašalić, said on 11 September, the day when the legal deadline for initiating court proceedings to establish the facts about missing babies expired, that the state of emergency introduced due to the COVID-19 epidemic should be extended for more than a month and a half. In that period, all deadlines in court proceedings ceased to run by a decree of the Government of Serbia. From the moment the law was passed onwards, the parents of the missing babies considered everything that happened to be "stretching and gaining time". Serbia was obliged to pass a special law, which would be the legal framework for resolving all cases of "missing babies", by the judgment of the European Court of Human Rights in Strasbourg from 2013 in the case of one of Zorica Jovanovic's mothers. The verdict handed down in 2013 by the European Court of Human Rights against Serbia in the case of Zorica Jovanovic, who sued the state for failing to get an answer to the question of what happened to a baby who was told she died in a maternity hospital in Cuprija for more than thirty years. the day after birth, was the key moment. The verdict ordered that the issue of missing children must be resolved systematically, and the bill was in the Assembly almost six years after the expiration of the deadline that Serbia received from the Council of Europe. In Serbia, more than 2,000 parents, gathered in associations, are looking for the truth about babies born two, three or more decades ago, who were told in maternity hospitals that they died, which they suspect, because many of them never received children's bodies or supporting documentation.

=== Environmental protests ===
==== Pipe breakage on the Rakiti river on 15 August 2020 ====
Activists of the movement "Let's Defend the Rivers of Stara Planina", with the support of the initiative "Let's not drown Belgrade", on Saturday, 15 August, broke a pipe in Rakitska Reka set up for the construction of a mini hydroelectric power plant (MHE), making it impossible. In the village of Rakita in southeastern Serbia, several hundred activists from different parts of Serbia gathered, as well as the surrounding countries, who, together with the inhabitants of this village, oppose the construction of SHPPs. During the "action", the police did not intervene and there were no incidents. By the decision of the Ministry of Environmental Protection from 4 January 2019, the investor was forbidden to perform works on the construction of SHPPs in the village of Rakita and was ordered to renew the terrain and return it to its original condition, i.e. to remove about 300 meters of already installed pipes from the riverbed. Activists of the movement "Let's Defend the Rivers of Stara Planina" pointed out that, for more than a year, the pipes have still been in the same place. They added that the local population and volunteers sent a notification about the action of removing the pipe to the municipality of Babusnica, the Ministry of Environmental Protection and the Ministry of Construction, Traffic and Infrastructure. Dissatisfied residents of the village of Rakita, located between Stara and Suva planina, have organized protests since the beginning of construction, in July 2017, as well as attempts to block the construction site. They also sent several requests to the authorities to respond to the events in Rakita. The protest was joined by environmental activists who spontaneously began to gather at locations on Stara and Suva planina, where the construction of SHPPs began.

==== Protest 10 January 2021 ====
Organized by the "Eco Guard", on 10 January 2021, several thousand people protested on Belgrade's Slavija Square, followed by a protest walk to the building of the Government of Serbia. The demonstrators demanded that urgent measures be taken to reduce chronic mass air pollution in Serbia.

==== 20 March and 3 April ====
A protest against the corona virus and new measures by the Serbian government began in the central Republic Square in Belgrade on Saturday, 20 March, at around 3:30 p.m., and anti-closure protests were organized on the same day in several other European cities. At the next protest on 3 April, several thousand citizens gathered on the Republic Square in Belgrade for the so-called "Protest for Freedom". Citizens who did not wear protective masks, nor did they respect physical distance, protested against epidemiological measures, the closure of the economy and schools. The organizer of the gathering, Ivica Božić, called for a change in the system in Serbia, due to the "consequences of 76 years of destruction of the people" and the abolition of the Crisis Staff for the fight against the coronavirus epidemic. He asked for debate shows to be organized on the Serbian Radio and Television and to explain the "harmful and good sides" of the vaccine. Among those gathered is Jovana Stojković, who was among businessmen two days before 1 April due to spreading false news about vaccination. One of the organizers of the protest, the Enough is Enough movement, in the announcement of the protest called for the defense of "freedom and protection of constitutionally guaranteed rights". The "Protest for Freedom" rally ended on Sava Square, in front of the monument to Stefan Nemanja, where the participants played a round.

==== Protest 7 – 10 April 2021 ====
Freelancers began a protest in front of the National Assembly on 7 April by setting up tents and announced that they would camp there for the next three days, dissatisfied with the new proposal of the Government of Serbia on amendments to the Law on Personal Income Tax, which regulates their position. They asked the Government of Serbia to withdraw the proposal on changes to that law and to sit down with the freelancers at the table again in order to find a compromise solution that would suit both the state and the workers on the Internet and regulate their position. They are asking the Government of Serbia to withdraw the proposal on changes to that law and to sit at the table again with freelancers in order to find a compromise solution that will suit both the state and workers on the Internet. The protest walk of freelancers organized by the Association of Workers on the Internet was held the next day with the message that they should not give up their demands for resolving the issue of tax collection. In front of the National Assembly, they reiterated their request to withdraw the amendments to the Law on Personal Income Tax from the procedure and to sit at the negotiating table with the representatives of the Government of Serbia. The president of the Association of Internet Workers, Miran Pogačar, told Tanjug that freelancers will stay in front of the Assembly for three days, that they will hold a protest tomorrow at 11 am, and that he will join the "Ecological Revolt" protest announced for Saturday, 10 April. A protest called "Ecological Uprising" was organized in front of the Serbian Parliament on Saturday, 10 April, at which the authorities are asked to respect the Constitution and existing laws and harmonize regulations with the highest environmental standards, with equal participation of citizens and non-governmental organizations. The gathered people went on a protest walk towards the Government, and then towards RTS. The gathering "Ecological Uprising" started around 13:20, with a band with percussion instruments, and then the representatives of the Association "Let's Defend the Rivers of Stara Planina" came on stage and took out the state flag, and a song about Stara Planina was broadcast from the sound system. On the plateau in front of the parliament, where the stage is set, on the street and in Pionirski Park, a large number of people gathered with banners with, among other things, the messages: "I'm afraid to breathe", "Rivers save because water is worth", "I carry black for all victims of pollution","We have given you pensions, we will not give you air and rivers"," I want to breathe".

==== Protests against proposed Rio Tinto mining operations ====
===== Protest on 11 September 2021 =====
The second "Ecological Uprising" was held on 11 September at the invitation of more than 30 environmental organizations in Belgrade, and had been caused by numerous problems related to environmental protection and the proposed jadarite mine in Jadar Valley, and ended with the blockade of Branko's Bridge. The protest rally of environmental activists began shortly after 2 pm on Nikola Pašić Square, and the main request was for the Government of Serbia to cancel all its obligations towards the company Rio Tinto. Citizens gathered in front of the stage set up in front of Nikola Pašić Square and played whistles, wore T-shirts and banners that read "Rio Tinto is leaving", "We will not give Jadar", "No - mine, exploitation, eviction", "Lithium in Levač - no". Those gathered carried the flags of environmental associations, as well as the flags of Serbia.

On social networks, citizens shared posts saying that buses with people from various parts of Serbia had been prevented and stopped on their way to Belgrade, as well as that the police had stopped the buses carrying people from the association "Ne damo Jadar" (We do not give Jadar) in order to prevent them from coming to Belgrade to protest. Nova Television also reported that "Autoprevoz Čačak" (Čačak's coach company) had canceled the bus to Belgrade for activists from the vicinity of Čačak, which had been reserved and paid for in advance.

Academic Nenad Kostić, a professor of chemistry and biochemistry at the University of Iowa, told those gathered that he spoke as a neutral scientist, not as a member of the Academy of Sciences and Arts, which organized a conference where Minister Zorana Mihajlović invented the term "green mining". "There is no green mining, only forests and pastures that will be endangered by the mine are green," he said, stating that harmful chemical processes would pollute the nature. Ratko Ristić, the Dean of the Faculty of Forestry in Belgrade, introduced himself as "an arrogant ignoramus, as Minister Zorana Mihajlović called us, because we oppose mining for jadarite in the Drina Valley." He estimated that several million cubic meters of the most toxic metals would endanger the drainage basin to the Adriatic, of the Drina and the Sava, and in the future would endanger the water supply from the Sava and the Danube. He also said that Rio Tinto had no reference for lithium mining, because they mined for copper, iron and gold.

Zlatko Kokanović, a farmer from Gornje Nedeljice (the village where the proposed mine would be built) who annually produces 100,000 liters of milk, said that "if this project in Jadar passes, Serbia is ready." Another 40 mines, 10 of which lithium, by 2035. "Whoever does not have clean air, water, agriculture and land, will not be able to live."

Environmental activist Aleksandar Jovanović Ćuta addressed the crowd with the words: "Who poisons Serbia - Linglong, Zidjin, Rio Tinto or maybe someone much more poisonous. There is a long list of predators that led to this evil. We are in the Bermuda Triangle - the city assembly, this is the one who, as soon as he sees a tree, immediately catches a chainsaw. The National Assembly of Serbia, filled with slaves who, instead of the people, will carry out the will of the one who imagined himself as a God, to whom Rio Tinto is dearer than our peasant. " He announced that after the rally in front of the National Assembly, he would block Branko's bridge, and if the mechanization appeared towards Loznica, he would block the whole of Serbia.

Actress Svetlana Bojković asked the gathered "Are we going to turn into a landfill so that the health and lives of our children and our families would be endangered?" "We must not allow Serbia to become a landfill for other people's dirty industries. What a pity. In the name of what? Profit? Has profit replaced God? It seems like that."

Around 16:10, a protest walk started towards Branko's Bridge, which would be blocked for two hours. There were incidents on the bridge because the police had not stopped the traffic on time. The situation was resolved after the passage of vehicles from the bridge to New Belgrade was freed. Cars and buses withdrew from the bridge because part of the bridge on the New Belgrade side was cleared.

A concert by Deca Loših Muzičara was held, as well as a liturgy led by the dismissed monk Antonije. Environmental activists ended the protest on Branko's bridge around 5:45 PM.

At the end of the meeting, the speakers said that "this was a warning blockade" and that they would "give the authorities seven days to fulfill their demands, and if that does not happen, they will continue with the protests in Serbia".

===== Protest on 6 November 2021 =====
A protest organized by the group "Ekološki ustanak" (Ecological Uprising) took place in front of the Radio Television of Serbia building in Belgrade. The participants demanded swift removal of the Rio Tinto commercial from the national television and the prohibition of the company advertising by the Electronic Media Regulatory Body. They also demanded revocation of all commitments to Rio Tinto by the Serbian government, and publishing the memorandum of understanding between the government and the company signed in 2017.

From the national television was requested to organize a prime-time debate between scientists, affected residents, and activists on one side and Rio Tinto representatives on the other side. The speakers included residents of the affected areas, actress Svetlana Bojković, the Dean of the Faculty of Forestry in Belgrade Ratko Ristić, environmental activist Aleksandar Jovanović Ćuta, and others.

===== Protest on 19 November 2021 =====
On 19 November 2021 a few hundred people gathered in front of the Radio Television of Serbia building in Belgrade at 19:00. The organizer was the citizen group Kreni-Promeni and the protest was in response to the refusal of the public television to broadcast the ad titled "Serbia is not for sale" (Srbija nije na prodaju). The ad was providing contra arguments to the prime-time Rio Tinto daily commercial. It had been produced by Kreni-Promeni and supported by donations. The national television received the necessary documentation and payment earlier in the week; however, they had not started broadcasting it.

An improvised theatre was created, and the ad was played for the gathered citizens. The actors Jelena Stupljanin and Viktor Savić who starred in the ad spoke. Stupljanin and Savić pointed out that it had nothing to do with politics. Stupljanin said: "It is really important for us all to realize that this is not a political battle; this is above politics. This is like when the national team is playing - it does not matter whether you support Zvezda or Partizan". She added that a complaint had been filed against Radio Television of Serbia (RTS).

RTS responded in a statement that they had not received all the necessary paperwork and that was the reason for their refusal.

===== Protest on 24 November 2021 against proposed changes to the expropriation and referendum laws =====
On Wednesday 24 November a protest was held in Belgrade as a warning that the highways would be blocked by the citizens if the government passes the bills that some activists consider controversial, while the authorities respond that none of the bills targets the people or the environment.

The Rio Tinto plans to build a lithium mine in the proximity of Loznica have been received with concerns by many environmental activists and scientists in the field. The activists consider that the proposed amendments to the Expropriation Law and Referendum Law are going to give the government more power in realizing these plans.

A protest was organized by several environmental organizations. A few hours prior to it, the president of Serbia Aleksandar Vučić said that the proposed amendment to the Expropriation Law "has nothing to do with Rio Tinto". He said that the motive for changes to the law is the advancement of the big infrastructure projects that are being postponed because of the problems with the private property and the owners' requests for big financial compensations.

The protesters brought signs with slogans related to the protection of the environment. Some of them read: "We want to breathe, and not to suffocate", "Polluters, you are not stronger than people", "Lithium in Levač – NO!", and "We do not give Levač, we do not give Loznica, we do not give Serbia".

The protesters requested from the government to revoke the proposed changes to the Expropriation Law, that the foreign corporations are prohibited from exploiting natural resources, polluting and destroying fertile land, and for the people to be provided clear drinking water. At the request of the protest organizer, the gathered raised their keys into the air, as a symbolic gesture of showing that if the new bill is passed, their homes would be taken.

Sava Manojlović, the president of the organization Kreni-Promeni, said that the Expropriation Law and the Referendum Law have been created for Rio Tinto. "First it will be the residents of Jadar, but then what happens there could happen to any resident of Serbia ... the government would take over their grandparents' property", he said. He added that the highways in Serbia would be blocked if the laws are passed. "If Serbia wants to move forward, it first must stop", Manojlović said.

===== Protests and roadblocks on 27 November 2021 =====
As the controversial laws on property expropriation and referendum passed in the National Assembly on 26 November, a one-hour blockade of roads in Serbia was held in Belgrade and other towns organized by several environmental organizations.

Hundreds of people appeared simultaneously in the capital Belgrade, the northern city of Novi Sad and other locations (Šabac, Požega, Kosjerić, Preljina, Kragujevac, Brezjak, close to the village of Gornje Nedeljice where the proposed mine would be built) to block main bridges and roads for one hour in what organizers described as a warning blockade. They pledged further protests if the laws on expropriation and referendum weren't withdrawn. The biggest and hardest was in Šabac, but the conflicts between the protesters and the police also happened in Belgrade and Novi Sad. According to some posts on social networks, a group of people attacked protesters with bats in Šabac, and a bulldozer was moved through the crowd. Some news outlets report that the incidents were initiated by the paramilitary connected with the government. Organizers said a number of people have been detained.

In Belgrade, the Gazela Bridge and the Mostar interchange were blocked, while a simultaneous protest was held in the center of the city.

Police earlier warned that any blockade of bridges is illegal.

Deputy Prime Minister Zorana Mihajlović responded that "road blockade has nothing to do with ecology, and those utilizing it as a means of protest only show their irresponsibility".

===== Protests and roadblocks on 4 December 2021 =====
For the second Saturday in a row, thousands of demonstrators blocked some of the key roads in Serbia. The protesters gathered in Belgrade, Novi Sad, Niš, Šabac, Požarevac, Valjevo, Kraljevo, Užice, Jagodina, Leskovac, Kruševac, Vranje, Požega, Smederevo, Subotica, Preljina, and other towns in organization of multiple environmental organizations and citizen groups.

The organizers stated the demands for revocation of the laws on referendum and expropriation, believed to be paving the way for Rio Tinto's lithium mine in western Serbia. The protests unfolded mainly peacefully with only sporadic incidents, as the uniformed police were not present at the scene. The protests lasted for about two hours.

In Belgrade several thousand protesters blocked the highway close to the Sava Centar, the Gazela Bridge, and the Slavija Square. At the roundabout in front of Novi Beograd municipality building protesters were constantly crossing the road, thus blocking the traffic. Traffic at Branko's Bridge was also blocked. Earlier in the day, lawyers organized a separate protest with the same demands.

In Novi Sad an incident was reported when about twenty young men came out of the vehicles and confronted the demonstrators. A fight broke out involving about a hundred participants, and injuries were reported. The intruders fled the scene, and the police did not intervene.

Protests in Šabac, where incidents had happened the week before, were peaceful.

In the southern town of Niš, several hundred people gathered in front of the city assembly building.

Priority vehicles including ambulances were allowed passage through blockades.

The demonstrators held Serbian flags and sporadically used whistles and trumpets.

Serbian President Aleksandar Vučić ignored the protests and traveled to the site where the international mining company planned to start its excavations. His office said he wanted to talk to the locals about the project. Vučić alleged the protests were financed by the West to destabilize the country and bring the opposition to power.

Minister of Defence Nebojša Stefanović said: "The blockade of bridges, highways, roads and the paralysis of life in Belgrade and other cities in Serbia is not a way to express any opinion, but a gross violation of the rights of most citizens" and that opposition parties "want to return to power at any cost".

===== Protests and roadblocks on 11 December 2021 =====
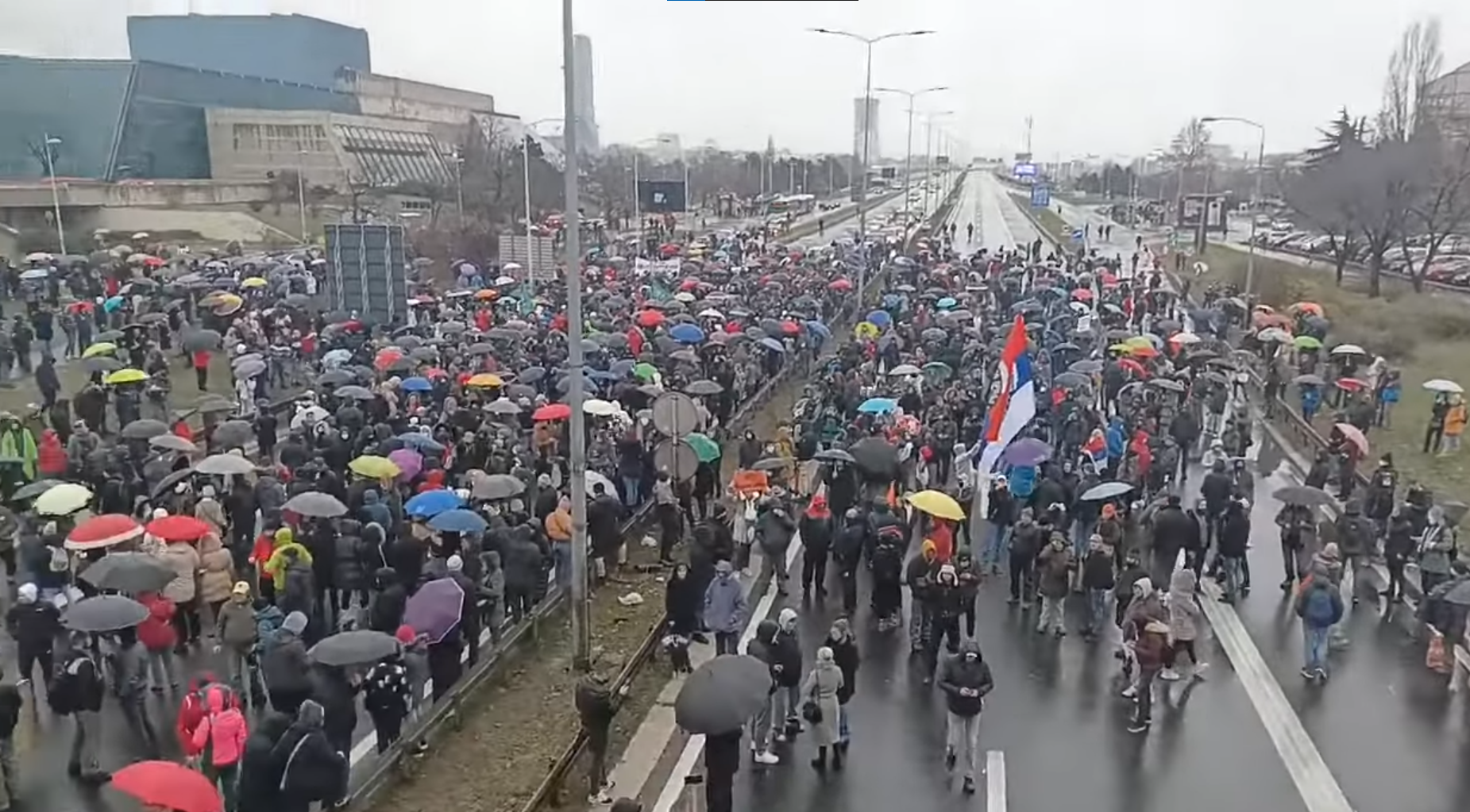
Protests on the Gazela Bridge

Lead organizers of the previous weeks' protests, Savo Manojlović and Nebojša Zelenović had a polemic during the Utisak nedelje show, which was held on 5 December. Zelenović, who heads the Green-Left coalition, expressed support for two additional demands (resignation of the president of the Electronic Media Regulatory Body and cancellation of all obligations towards Rio Tinto), while Manojlović opposed the move because, as he stated "the story would be diluted", and he compared the move to the 1 of 5 million protests which failed due to adding demands during protests. Two days later, Manojlović asserted that the protests wouldn't end until the demands were met.

On 8 December, during the Morning Program on RTS, actors Marko Grabež and Nedim Nezirović voiced support for the upcoming protests. Following the announcement that Vučić had withdrawn the expropriation law and amended the referendum law, Manojlović controversially declared the "big national celebration" and called for a celebration to be held in Belgrade. He later overturned his statement saying that there could be no celebration while others continue to fight, and stated that "we cannot trample on the word we have given" and that no one should have monopoly over the protests. Other leading organizations stated their support for the continuation of the protests. On the day of the protests, Vučić stated that "all wishes of the protesters have been fulfilled".

Organizers announced that roads in 50 cities would be blocked, and over 40 organizations participated in the protests. Manojlović and his "Kreni-Promeni" organization did not participate. After the two main demands were adopted by the government, the protesters continued to demand that Rio Tinto leaves Serbia. This time, the protests were only held for an hour due to bad weather. The protests mostly remained peaceful, with some incidents happening in Belgrade and Niš. In Belgrade, a group of right-wing and anti-vax activists participated in the protests, and a group of pro-government activists waved pro-Rio Tinto slogans. Serbian diaspora also held protests in Brussels, Prague, Washington, D.C., Berlin, New York City and London. During the protests, Ćuta affirmed that "the protests won't stop until Rio Tinto leaves Serbia".

Following the protests, minister Mihajlović stated that Ćuta supports "a violent change of government" and is "abusing environmentalism for the election campaign". A day later, protests were also held in Zrenjanin.

=== Clerical protests ===
==== "Family walk" organized by Dveri on 15 May ====
Participants in the "Family Walk", organized by the Dveri movement, demanded the withdrawal from the parliamentary procedure of three, as it was said, unconstitutional laws, including the one on same-sex unions. At the gathering in front of the Assembly of Serbia, organized on the occasion of the International Day of the Family, the leader of Dveri, Boško Obradović, said that it was necessary to withdraw from the procedure all three unconstitutional and anti-Christian laws. Obradović pointed out that Dveri is proposing a tax reform that should enable tax cuts for those who are married and have children, so that more money remains in the household budget.

==== Anti-LGBT protest on 18 September ====
A protest of anti-globalists and opponents of covid passes, vaccinations and other measures against coronavirus was held in Belgrade on 18 September. A group of several dozen demonstrators threw eggs at the police cordon in Nemanjina Street. Numerous organizations are protesting - the Anti-Globalists of Serbia, Doctors and Parents for Science and Ethics, the Movement of the Serbian Parliament, the Movement of the Kidnapped Baby - a change in the system. As can be seen in the photos of news agencies, the leader of Dveri, Boško Obradović, joined the gathering on the Square, who supported the protest. The protesters started the protest walk from the Square, and torches were lit behind the Presidency building, on Terazije. From the podium placed on the truck, they said that they were against covid passes, masks, vaccinations, and that they were "disgusted" by the Pride Parade. They set fire to and trampled the rainbow-colored flag, a symbol of the LGBT community. The demonstrators pointed out the flags of Serbia and various movements, some of them carry icons, and they also developed the banner "Unity will be the defeat of the devil". They sang "Oh, Kosovo, Kosovo". At around 7.30 pm, those gathered set off through Terazije, towards the building of the Government of Serbia. A group of demonstrators tried to climb Nemanjina Street, but the police cordon did not allow them to pass. Then they turned and went down Nemanjina Street to the monument to Stefan Nemanja, where they spread banners and flags. At one point, the participants in the protest played a round of Užice around the monument. A group of demonstrators threw eggs at a police cordon in Nemanjina Street, near the former General Staff building. Earlier in the evening, the Minister of Police, Aleksandar Vulin, briefly visited the police cordon, but did not address the media. Police cordons for breaking up demonstrations near the Belgrade woman and in Resavska Street.

=== Protests against COVID passports ===
About two hundred citizens gathered in front of the Serbian Parliament the next evening to express their dissatisfaction with the introduction of passports for COVID-19. The part of the street in front of the assembly was closed because the gathered people went out on the street and blocked it, from the House of Trade Unions to the main post office building. At one point he came across an ambulance under rotation. At the beginning, some of those gathered did not want to miss it, but after the discussion, the van passed. At the protest, "March on the Drina" was heard from the loudspeakers, and those gathered shouted "Don't be a sheep". Then they started on Kneza Miloša Street in the direction of the Government of Serbia. Traffic was blocked there as well, and the police were also present.

A new protest was held in Niš with the same number of people and with similar messages. Residents of Niš protested again in the central city square because of the decision of the Republic Crisis Staff. The gathered, about 200 of them, pointed out that the decision to introduce passports "deprived them of basic human rights". "We want the right to choose, freedom of movement and freedom of speech. The number of deaths from coronavirus is false, they are increasing and decreasing according to their discretion", said one of the participants in the protest rally. She said that the obligatory vaccination of children must be stopped urgently. At the end of the protest, the gathered citizens briefly blocked the traffic in the center of Niš, and then dispersed. A new gathering at King Milan Square was announced for the following evening at 8 pm.

== Police brutality ==
Few journalists who were documenting protests on the night of 7 July 2020 said that police brutality was present. Non-government organisation Belgrade center for human rights built two legal cases against policeman for police brutality. Around 23:30 on 7 July 2020, police beat up Beta journalist with truncheons even though he showed the journalist legitimisation, they continued to hit him even after he fell on the ground. Minister of Interior Nebojša Stefanović said police acted violently only when it was forced to. Pictures of excessive force by police were shared across social media, one of an arrested protester lying on the ground with a policeman pressing his boot on his head. During that night opposition parties, who had boycotted the parliamentary elections held a few weeks earlier, condemned the regime's use of force and called the authorities to take action against the policemen responsible for the excessive force, also calling citizens to meet the next day again at the same location.

The day after the protest, government officials condemned the protesters' behaviour as "scandalous". The chief of police Vladimir Rebić justified the police action by stating that the use of teargas was proportionate. Serbian PM Brnabić insisted that the state order would be preserved. The minister of defence Aleksandar Vulin labelled the protest as a coup d'état intended to allow various punks, extremists and fascists to take over the government without elections and with no agenda beyond violent overthrow of the government. Vucic appeared on a TV show, where he showed pictures of wounded policemen and accused the protesters of being violent. He stated that there would be no curfew for the weekend, although he would preferred to impose one. Regarding police brutality, he accused the protesters of being hostile, and accused the three men on the bench of attacking the police, prompting them to respond in self-defence. He also accused foreign intelligence agencies in the region of organising the protest.

The next evening police were again seen using excessive force towards the protesters. A new video circulated on social media in which a man was beaten by a crowd of policemen while lying on the ground, the policemen kicking and beating the man repeatedly. Other footage showed a police officer kneeling to tie his shoe next to an arrested and handcuffed protester lying face-down, while another officer slapped the protester in the face. Journalists from NOVA S were again attacked by riot police, despite making it clear that they are members of the press. The same day, Vulin ordered an elite military unit known as the 63rd parachute brigade to intervene in Niš because of a lack of police forces in the town. The military refused to intervene, stating that it was not their duty to intervene in such events, that the military enjoys respect and trust among the population, and that their duties are explained in the constitution. A new video emerged after the protests showing a police officer setting a garbage bin on fire.

=== Involvement of the armed forces ===
On 9 July 2020, several news outlets reported that the Minister of Defence Aleksandar Vulin had ordered the 63rd Parachute Brigade to clear peaceful protesters in Niš, but the Brigade commander has refused to carry on the order. The claim was denied by the Serbian Ministry of Defence saying that would go against the Constitution of Serbia as well as the existing Military Code.

== Responses and reactions ==
=== Aleksandar Vučić ===
After the first protests on 7 July, the president said that in the protests "there was not only criminal factors but also foreign factors as well". He also called these protests "the worst political violence in the past few years". Vučić accused Russia of organising the protests. The same day he declined a meeting with Russian ambassador Bocan-Harchenko. Many government critics have suggested that this was an alibi for the west for not making progress in the Kosovo negotiations. Later the Russian ambassador responded to the accusations of intervention on Twitter, mainly by CEAS (The Center of Euro-Atlantic Studies), stating that their accusations were absurd, accused them of Russophobia, and also criticising domestic media outlets for spreading such a statement.

On 8 July, he called the protests an act of terrorism, he also said the protests "don't bother him at all". On 10 July, Vučić blamed Croatia for the riots. Vučić has blamed the spike of COVID-19 on the protesters and has dissed them as "fascists, right-wingers, conspiracy theorists and flat-Earthers" and etcetera.

=== Aleksandar Vulin ===
The Serbian Minister of Defence, Aleksandar Vulin said that a special war is waged against the Army and the country by fake news. He also called protests on 8 July "an attempt to start a civil war"

=== United States ===
The United States Embassy in Serbia had issued a press release stating that they are concerned with violence against the police officers, as well as targeted police brutality against peaceful protesters. They further stated that the freedom of expression and peaceful assembly are a vital point of any democracy, and that Serbia must work on its freedom of media and rule of law.

=== European Union ===
Sem Fabrizi, ambassador of the EU to Serbia, said that Brussels is worried by recent riots in Serbia.

=== Russia ===
Following the allegations about Russian involvement in the ongoing protests in certain Serbian media close to the ruling party, the Russian ambassador to Serbia denied these claims and stated on his Twitter account that the allegations are 'unfounded' 'absurd' and 'twisted'.

The Russian Foreign Ministry followed up with a statement in which they called the allegations of Russian involvement in the protests as 'fake' and had the aim of 'casting a shadow on Serbian-Russian partnership'.

=== Serbian Interior Ministry ===
On 27 October 2020, the Serbian Interior Ministry mentioned that they were still investigating police attacks on journalists that happened on 8 July 2020.

=== Bosnia and Herzegovina ===
Member of the Presidency of Bosnia and Herzegovina, Milorad Dodik, said that the police didn't use enough force and that it should've used live bullets.

== See also ==
- 2017 Serbian protests
- 2020 Serbian parliamentary elections
- 2024 Serbian environmental protests
- COVID-19
- COVID-19 pandemic in Serbia
- Police brutality
- Protests over responses to the COVID-19 pandemic
- Serbian protests (2018–2020)
