= European Green Deal =

Plan to transform the EU into a climate-neutral economy by 2050

Development of CO_{2} emissions in the European Union

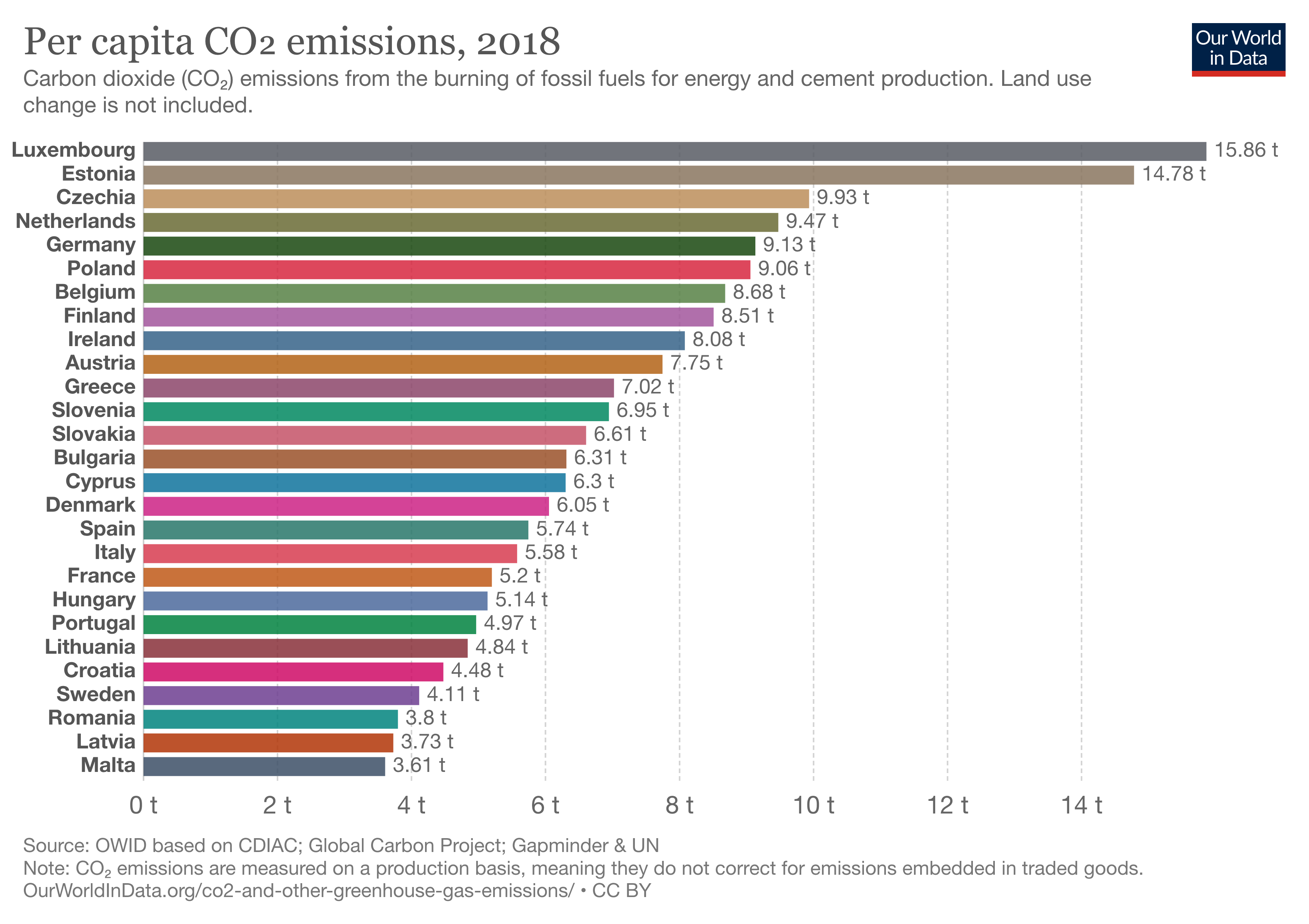
CO_{2} emissions per capita in the European Union

Global carbon dioxide emissions by jurisdiction, 2023

The European Green Deal, approved in 2020, is a set of policy initiatives by the European Commission with the overarching aim of making the European Union (EU) climate neutral in 2050. The plan is to review each existing law on its climate merits, and also introduce new legislation on the circular economy (CE), building renovation, biodiversity, farming and innovation.

The president of the European Commission, Ursula von der Leyen, stated that the European Green Deal would be Europe's "man on the moon moment". On 13 December 2019, the European Council decided to press ahead with the plan, with an opt-out for Poland. On 15 January 2020, the European Parliament voted to support the deal as well, with requests for higher ambition. A year later, the European Climate Law was passed, which legislated that greenhouse gas emissions should be 55% lower in 2030 compared to 1990. The Fit for 55 package is a large set of proposed legislation detailing how the European Union plans to reach this target. ETS2 is the new EU Emissions Trading System that will enter into force in 2027 and, for the first time in history, will set a price for CO2 emissions from fuels used in the building and road transport sectors.

The European Commission's climate change strategy, launched in 2020, is focused on a promise to make Europe a net-zero emitter of greenhouse gases by 2050 and to demonstrate that economies will develop without increasing resource usage. However, the Green Deal has measures to ensure that nations that are already reliant on fossil fuels are not left behind in the transition to renewable energy. The green transition is a top priority for Europe. The EU member states want to reduce greenhouse gas emissions by 55% by 2030 from 1990 levels, and become climate neutral by 2050.

Von der Leyen appointed Frans Timmermans as Executive Vice President of the European Commission for the European Green Deal in 2019. He was succeeded by Maroš Šefčovič in 2023, and Teresa Ribera in 2024.

== European Climate Pact ==
The European Climate Pact is an initiative of the European Commission supporting the implementation of the European Green Deal. It is a movement to build a greener Europe, providing a platform to work and learn together, develop solutions, and achieve real change.

The Pact provides opportunities for people, communities, and organizations to participate in climate and environmental action across Europe. By pledging to the Pact, European stakeholders commit to taking concrete climate and environmental actions in a way that can be measured and/or followed up. Participating in the Pact is an opportunity for organizations to share their transition journey with their peers and collaborate with other actors towards common targets.

== Aims ==
The overarching aim of the European Green Deal is for the European Union to become the world's first "climate-neutral bloc" by 2050. It has goals extending to many different sectors, including construction, biodiversity, energy, transport and food.

The plan includes potential carbon tariffs for countries that don't curtail their greenhouse gas pollution at the same rate. The mechanism to achieve this is called the Carbon Border Adjustment Mechanism (CBAM). It also includes:

- a circular economy action plan, The European Commission has released a number of publications on circular economy, including one that requires Member States to carry out activities related to changing their economies into circular economies. The CE has indeed become a key component of the European Green Deal and the Coronavirus Recovery Plan of the Von der Leyen Commission (2019–present), and it was a key component of the Juncker Commission's ambition to create a sustainable, low-carbon, resource-efficient, and competitive economy.
- a review and possible revision (where needed) of the all relevant climate-related policy instruments, including the Emissions Trading System,
- a Farm to Fork strategy along with a focus shift from compliance to performance (which will reward farmers for managing and storing carbon in the soil, improved nutrient management, reducing emissions, ...),
- a revision of the Energy Taxation Directive which is looking closely at fossil fuel subsidies and tax exemptions (aviation, shipping),
- a sustainable and smart mobility strategy and
- an EU forest strategy. The latter will have as its key objectives effective afforestation, and forest preservation and restoration in Europe.

It also leans on Horizon Europe, to play a pivotal role in leveraging national public and private investments. Through partnerships with industry and member States, it will support research and innovation on transport technologies, including batteries, clean hydrogen, low-carbon steel making, circular bio-based sectors and the built environment.

The EU plans to finance the policies set out in the Green Deal through an investment plan – InvestEU, which forecasts at least €1 trillion in investment. Furthermore, for the EU to reach its goals set out in the deal, it is estimated that approximately €260 billion a year is going to be required by 2030 in investments.

Almost half of all European residential structures were built before 1970. At the time, no consideration was given to the amount of energy used by materials and standards. At the present rate of refurbishment, reaching a highly energy-efficient and decarbonised building stock might take more than a century. One of the major aims of the European Green Deal is to "at least double or even triple" the current refurbishment rate of approximately 1%. This is also true outside of the EU. In addition to rehabilitation, investment is required to enable the development of new efficient and ecologically friendly structures.

In July 2021, the European Commission released its "Fit for 55" legislation package, which contains important guidelines for the future of the automotive industry: All new cars sold in the EU must be zero-emission vehicles from 2035.

In the context of the Paris Agreement, and therefore using today's emissions as baseline, since 1990 EU emissions already dropped by 25% at 2019, a 55% reduction target using 1990 as baseline represents in 2019 terms a 40% reduction target, which can be calculated using this equation:
$$\left ( \frac{0.55-0.25}{1-0.25} \right ) = 0.40 = 40\%$$

According to the Emissions Gap Report 2020 by the United Nations Environment Programme, meeting the Paris Agreement's 1.5 °C temperature increase target (with 66% probability) requires GtCO_{2}e 34/59 = 57% emissions reduction globally from 2019 levels by 2030, therefore well above the 40% target of the European Green Deal. This 57% emission reduction target at 2030 represents average global reductions, while advanced economies are expected to contribute more.

== Policy areas ==
=== Clean energy ===
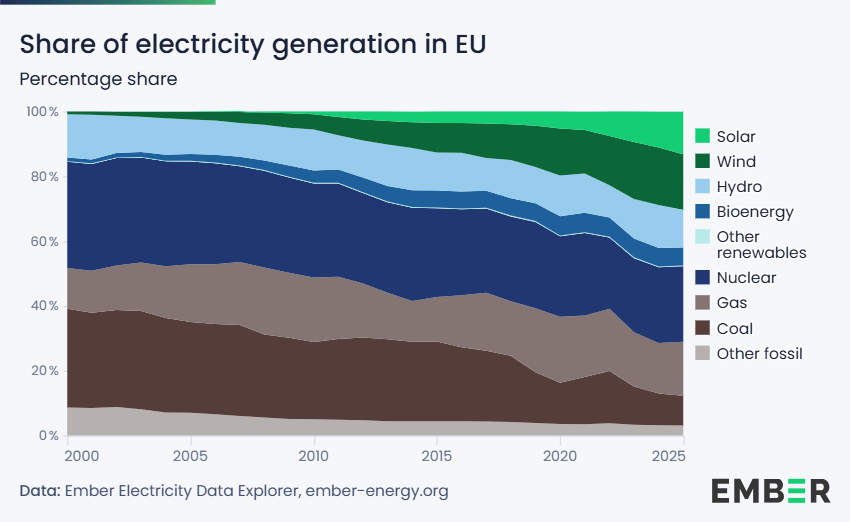
Electricity generation in the EU by source - percentage share

Climate neutrality by the year of 2050 is the main goal of the European Green Deal. For the EU to reach their target of climate neutrality, one goal is to decarbonise their energy system by aiming to achieve "net-zero greenhouse gas emissions by 2050." Their relevant energy directive is intended to be looked over and adjusted if problem areas arise. Many other in place and present regulations will also be reviewed. In 2023, the Member states will update their climate and national energy plans to adhere to the EU's climate goal for 2030. The key principles include:

- to "prioritise energy efficiency"
- to "develop a power sector based largely on renewable resources",
- to secure an affordable EU energy supply
- and to have a "fully integrated, interconnected digitalised EU energy market."

In 2020, the European Commission unveiled its strategy for a greener, cleaner energy future. The EU Strategy for Energy System Integration serves as a framework for an energy transition, which comprises measures to achieve a more circular system, and measures to implement greater direct electrification as well as to develop clean fuels (including hydrogen). The European Clean Hydrogen Alliance has also been launched as hydrogen has a special role to play in this seismic shift.

By 2023, greentech was one of the few sectors in the EU where venture capital investments matched those in the United States, highlighting the impact of the EU's ambitious climate goals and government subsidies. The European Green Deal and accompanying government policies have driven substantial investment in greentech, particularly in areas like energy storage, circular economy initiatives, and agricultural technology. This focus has enabled the EU to close the existing investment gap with the US in these strategic sectors.

=== Sustainable industry ===
Another target area to achieve the EU's climate goals is the introduction of the Circular Economy Industrial policy. In March 2020, the EU announced their Industrial Strategy with its aim to "empower citizens, revitalises regions and have the best technologies." Key points of this policy area include boosting the modern aspects of industries, influencing the exploration and creation of "climate neutral" circular economy friendly goods markets. This further entails the "decarbonisation and modernisation of energy-intensive industries such as steel and cement."

A 'Sustainable products' policy is also projected to be introduced which will focus on reducing the wastage of materials. This aims to ensure products will be reused and recycling processes will be reinforced. The materials particularly focused on include "textiles, construction, vehicles, batteries, electronics and plastics." The European Union is also of the opinion that it "should stop exporting its waste outside of the EU" and it will therefore "revisit the rules on waste shipments and illegal exports" The EU mentioned that "the Commission will also propose to revise the rules on end-of-life vehicles with a view to promoting more circular business models." The European Commission estimates that up to 2030, Europe's green investment offensive will cost an additional €350 billion annually.

=== Building and renovation ===
This policy area is targeting the process of building and renovation in regards to their currently unsustainable methods. Many non-renewable resources are used in the process as well. Thus, the plan focuses on promoting the use of energy efficient building methods such as climate proofing buildings, increasing digitalisation and enforcing rules surrounding the energy performance of buildings. Social housing renovation will also occur in order to reduce the price of energy bills for those less able to finance these costs. They aim to triple the renovation rate of all buildings to reduce the pollution emitted during these processes.

Digital technologies are important in achieving the European Green Deal's environmental targets. Emerging digital technologies, if correctly applied, have the potential to play a critical role in addressing environmental issues. Smart city mobility, precision agriculture, sustainable supply chains, environmental monitoring, and catastrophe prediction are just a few examples.

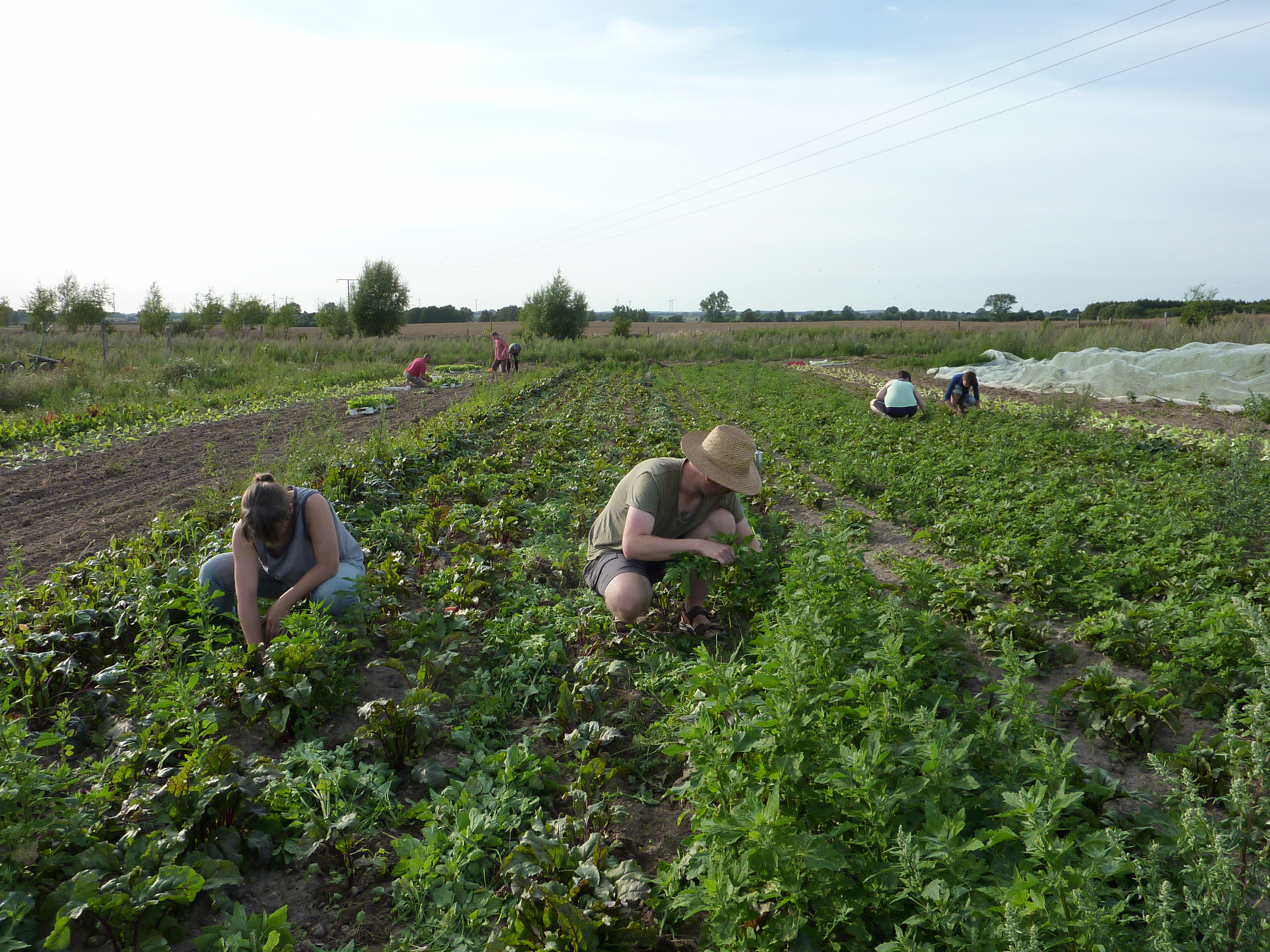
Organic farming methods to be used in response to 'From Farm to Fork' strategy

=== Sustainable food system ===
The Farm to Fork (F2F) strategy pursues the issue of food system sustainability as well as the support allocated to the producers such as farmers and fishermen. The methods of production and transfer of these resources are what the E.U. considers a climate-friendly approach, aiming to increase efficiency as well. The price and quality of the goods will aim to not be hindered during these newly adopted processes. Specific target areas include reducing the use of chemical pesticides, increasing the availability of health food options and aiding consumers to understand the health ratings of products and sustainable packaging.

In the official page of the Farm to Fork program, Frans Timmermans the Executive Vice-president of the European Commission, is cited saying that:

"The coronavirus crisis has shown how vulnerable we all are, and how important it is to restore the balance between human activity and nature. At the heart of the Green Deal the Biodiversity and Farm to Fork strategies point to a new and better balance of nature, food systems and biodiversity; to protect our people's health and well-being, and at the same time to increase the EU's competitiveness and resilience. These strategies are a crucial part of the great transition we are embarking upon."

The F2F program includes the next targets:

- Making 25% of EU agriculture organic, by 2030.
- Reduce by 50% the use of pesticides by 2030.
- Reduce the use of Fertilizers by 20% by 2030.
- Reduce nutrient depletion by at least 50%.
- Reduce the use of antimicrobials in agriculture and antimicrobials in aquaculture by 50% by 2030.
- Create sustainable food labeling.
- Reduce food waste by 50% by 2030.
- Dedicate to R&I related to the issue €10 billion.

While the F2F focused on sustainability, in 2025 it was partly replaced by the Vision for Agriculture and Food, which shifted the emphasis to competitiveness and simplifying regulations.

=== Eliminating pollution ===
The 'Zero Pollution Action Plan' that aims to be adopted by the commission in 2021 intends to achieve no pollution from "all sources", cleaning the air, water and soil by 2050. The Environment Quality standards are to be fully met, enforcing all industrial activities to be within toxic-free environments. Agricultural and urban industries water management policies will be overlooked to suit the "no harm" policy. Harmful resources such as micro-plastics and chemicals, such as pharmaceuticals, that are threatening the environment aim to be substituted in order to reach this goal. The 'Farm to Fork' strategy aids pollution reduction from excess nutrients and sustainable methods of production and transportation.

Some formulations of the plan such as "toxic-free" and "zero pollution" have been criticized by Genetic Literacy Project as anti-scientific and contradictory, as any substance can be toxic at specific dose, and almost any life-related process results in "pollution".

=== Sustainable mobility ===
A reduction in emissions from transportation methods is another target area within the European Green Deal. A comprehensive strategy on "Sustainable and Smart mobility" intends to be implemented. This will increase the adoption of sustainable and alternative fuels in road, maritime and air transport and fix the emission standards for combustion-engine vehicles. It also aims to make sustainable alternative solutions available to businesses and the public. Smart traffic management systems and applications intend to be developed as a solution. Freight delivery methods aim to be altered, with preferred pathways being by land or water. Public transport alterations aim to reduce public congestion as well as pollution. Installations of charging ports for electric vehicles intends to encourage the purchase of low-emission vehicles. The 'Single European Sky' plan focuses on air traffic management in order to increase safety, flight efficiency and environmentally friendly conditions.

=== Biodiversity and ecosystem health ===
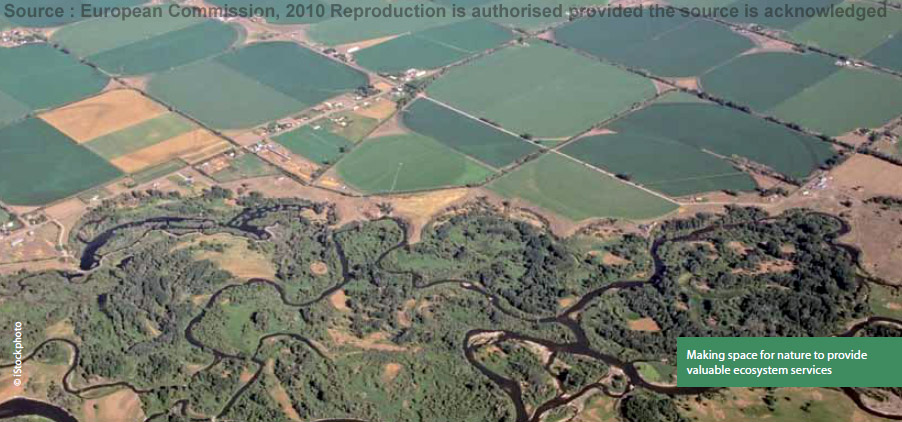
EU protection of Biodiversity

The EU Biodiversity Strategy was published in 2020 and adopted by the European Parliament on June 9, 2021. Management of forests and maritime areas, environment protection and addressing the issue of losses of species and ecosystems are all aspects of this target area.

Restoration of affected ecosystems is intended to occur through implementing organic farming methods, aiding pollination processes, restoring free flowing rivers, reducing pesticides that harm surrounding wildlife and reforestation. The EU wants to protect 30% of land and 30% of sea, whilst creating stricter safeguards around new and old growth forests. Their aim is to restore ecosystems and their biological levels.

The official page of the EU Biodiversity Strategy for 2030 cites Ursula von der Leyen, President of the European Commission, saying that:

"Making nature healthy again is key to our physical and mental wellbeing and is an ally in the fight against climate change and disease outbreaks. It is at the heart of our growth strategy, the European Green Deal, and is part of a European recovery that gives more back to the planet than it takes away."

The biodiversity strategy is an essential part of the climate change mitigation strategy of the European Union. From the 25% of the European budget that will go to fight climate change, a large portion of that will be dedicated to restoring biodiversity and nature based solutions.

The EU Biodiversity Strategy for 2030 includes the following targets:

- Protect 30% of the sea territory and 30% of land territory especially primary forests and old-growth forests.
- Plant 3 billion trees by 2030.
- Restore at least 25,000 kilometers of rivers, so they will become free-flowing.
- Reduce the use of pesticides by 50% by 2030.
- Increase organic farming.
- Increase biodiversity in agriculture.
- Reverse the decline of pollinators.
- Give €20 billion per year to the issue and make it part of the business practice.

According to the page, approximately half of the global GDP depends on nature. In Europe many parts of the economy that generate trillions € per year, depend on nature. Currently the benefits of Natura 2000 in Europe contribute €200 - €300 billion per year. Florika Fink-Hooijer, Director General of the Directorate-General for the Environment, said that the EU has the "ambition to be a standard setter" for global biodiversity policy.

==== Nature Restoration Law ====
The Nature Restoration Law is a regulation (Regulation (EU) 2024/1991) of the European Union to protect the EU environments and restore its nature to a good ecological state through renaturation. The law is a core element of the European Green Deal and the EU Biodiversity Strategy and makes the targets set therein for the "restoration of nature" binding. EU member states will have to develop their national restoration plans by 2026. They will have to restore at least 30% of habitats in poor condition by 2030, 60% by 2040, and 90% by 2050.

The regulation is a response to Europe's declining natural environments, with more than 80% of habitats in poor condition. Its goals include protecting the functioning of ecosystem services, climate change mitigation, resilience and autonomy by preventing natural disasters and reducing risks to food security, and restoring damaged ecosystems.

The regulation was proposed by the European Commission on 22 June 2022. The law was adopted in the Council of the European Union on 17 June 2024 and was published in the EU's Official Journal on 29 July 2024, thus coming into force on 18 August 2024 (20th day after publication).

== Motivation ==
The main aim of the European Green Deal is to become climate neutral by the year of 2050. The reasons pushing for the plan's creation are based upon the environmental issues such as climate change, a loss of biodiversity, ozone depletion, water pollution, urban stress, waste production and more. The following statistics highlight the climate related issues within the European Union:

- In regards to climate change, carbon dioxide levels are predicted to double by the year of 2030 with Europe's temperature expected to increase by 2-3 °C in the summer season.
- Europe is responsible for nearly one third of the world's gas emissions that deplete the ozone.
- More than 50% of all surface area where ecosystems are in Europe are presented with threats from management problems and stresses.
- On average, 700,000 hectares of woodland are burnt annually by fires "often caused by socioeconomic factors" within the European Union, leading to the degradation of forests.

=== Clean energy statistics ===
Global carbon dioxide emissions by country in 2023:
1. China (31.8%)
2. United States (14.4%)
3. European Union (4.90%)
4. India (9.50%)
5. Russia (5.80%)
6. Japan (3.50%)
7. Other (30.1%)
- In 2017, more than 75% of greenhouse gas emissions within the EU were related to the production and use of energy.
- In 2017, 17.5% of the EU's gross energy consumption in 2017 was sourced from renewable resources.

=== Sustainable industry statistics ===
- Studies showed that from the year of 1970 to 2017, the world's yearly extraction of resources tripled. This process is responsible for 90% of all loss in biodiversity.
- The European Union's current industry is responsible for 20% of their greenhouse gas emissions.
- The current resources that originate from recycling methods is 12% within the European Union's industry.

=== Building and renovations statistics ===
- The building and renovation methods used by the European Union use 40% of all energy consumed.

=== Farm to fork statistics ===
- Within the European Union, "20% of food production is wasted" whilst "36 million of the population are unable to have quality meal every second day."

=== Eliminating pollution statistics ===
- From the 50,000 industrial locations in the EU, up to €189 billion is spent on health issues related to pollution from these installations.

=== Sustainable mobility statistics ===
- 25% of Greenhouse gas emissions result from transportation methods. Road transport takes 71.7% of this total, followed by 13.9% from Aviation, 13.4% from Water, with railways and other accumulating the remainder.
- The Single European Sky strategy is predicted to help reduce 10% of aviation emissions.

=== Biodiversity ===
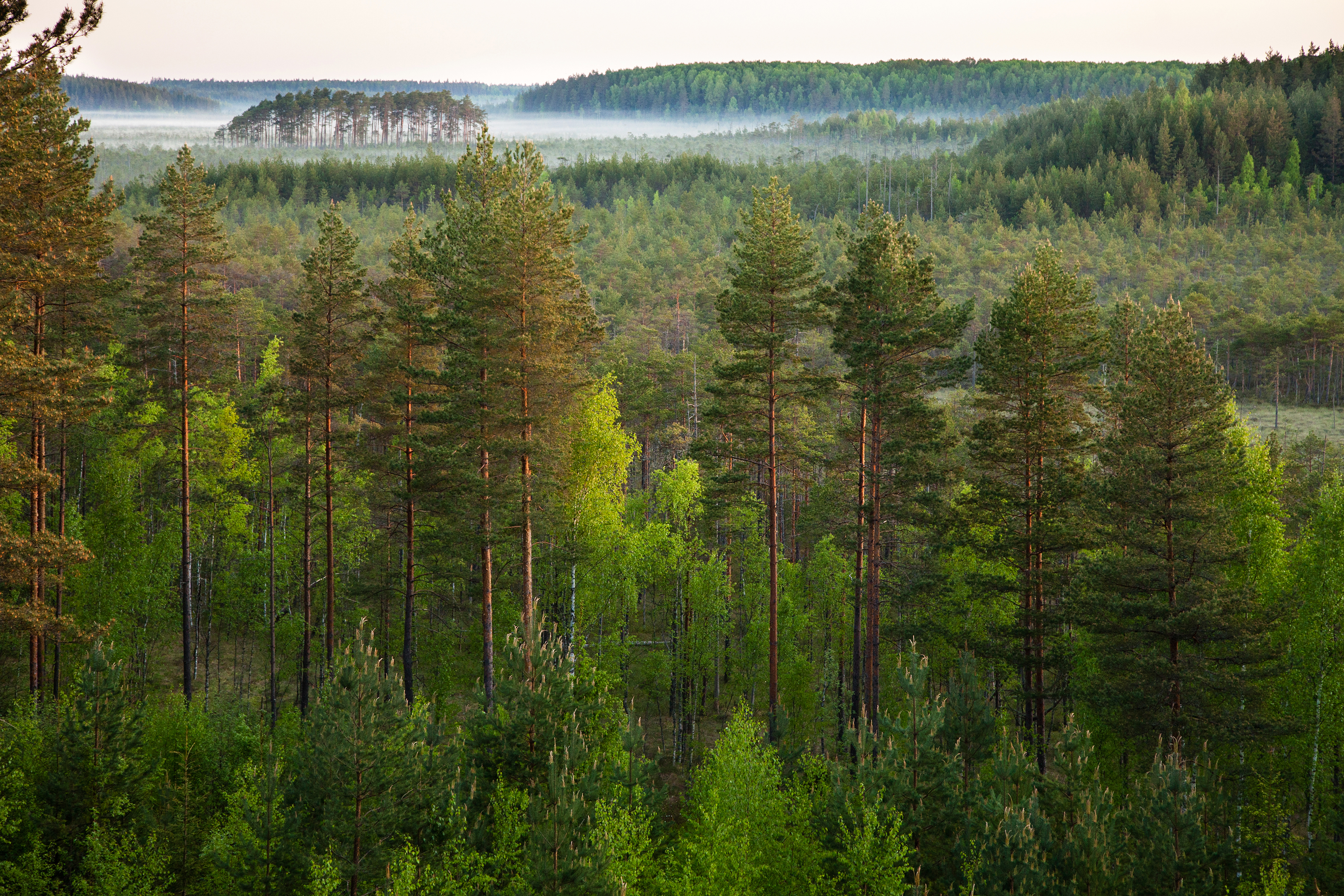
Forests, like Meenikunno Nature Park in Estonia, will be restored

- Within the EU, €40 trillion depends on nature and its resources.
- The population of wild species has declined by over 50% on average in the last two generations.

All 54 actions were adopted or implemented by 2019. The EU is now recognised as a leader in circular economy policy making globally. The waste legislation was adopted in 2018, following negotiations with the European Parliament and Member States in the European Council. According to Eurostat, jobs related to circular economy activities have increased by 6% between 2012 and 2016 within the EU. The action plan has also encouraged at least 14 Member States, eight regions, and 11 cities to put forward circular economy strategies.

== Timeline ==
- 11 December 2019: The European Green Deal was presented.
- 14 January 2020: The European Green Deal Investment Plan as well as the Just Transition Mechanism were presented.
- 4 March 2020: There was a proposal for a European climate law to ensure a climate neutral European Union by 2050. A public consultation was held on the European Climate Pact (in regards to bringing together regions, local communities, civil society, business and schools).
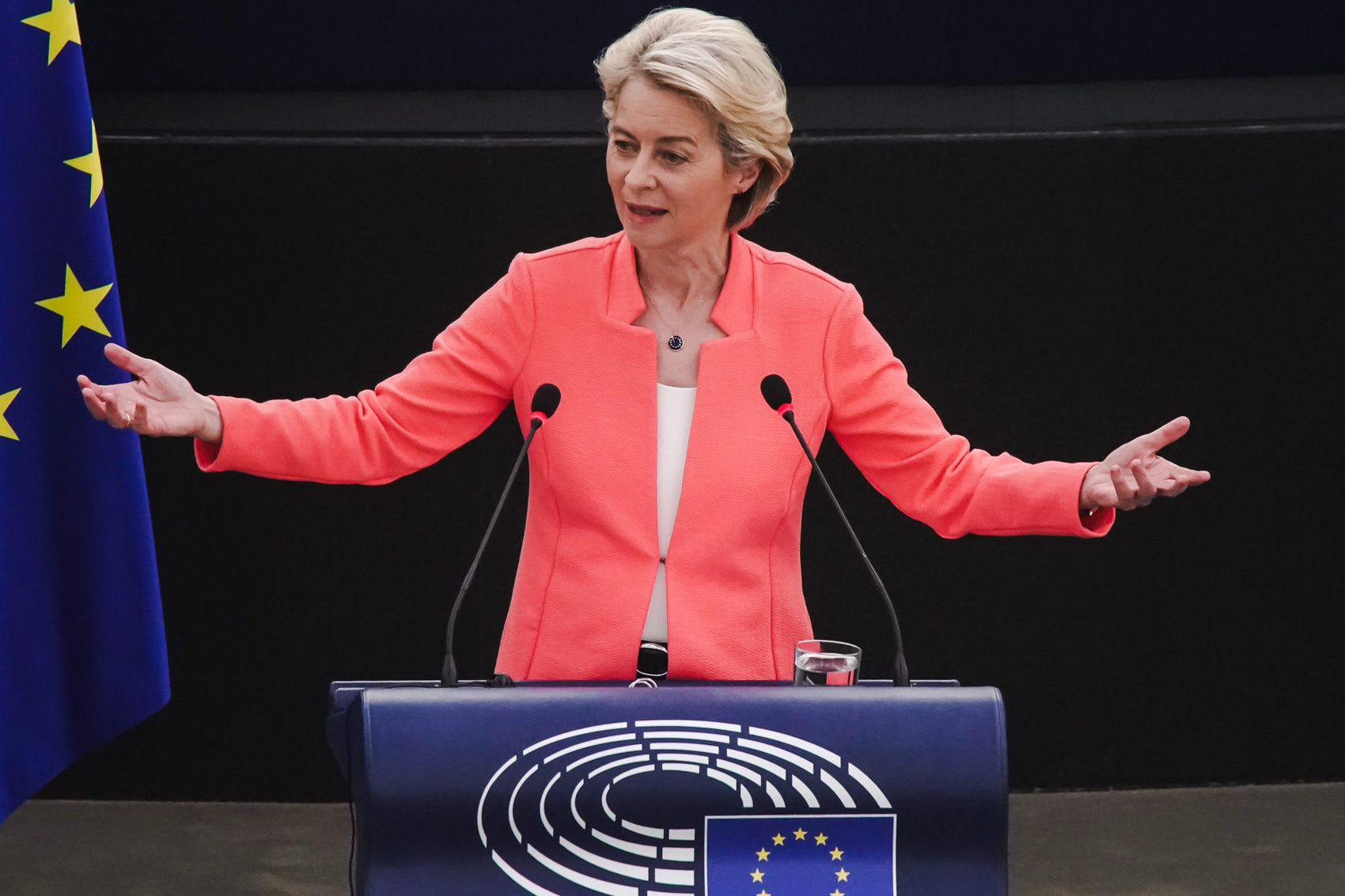
  European Commission President Ursula von der Leyen

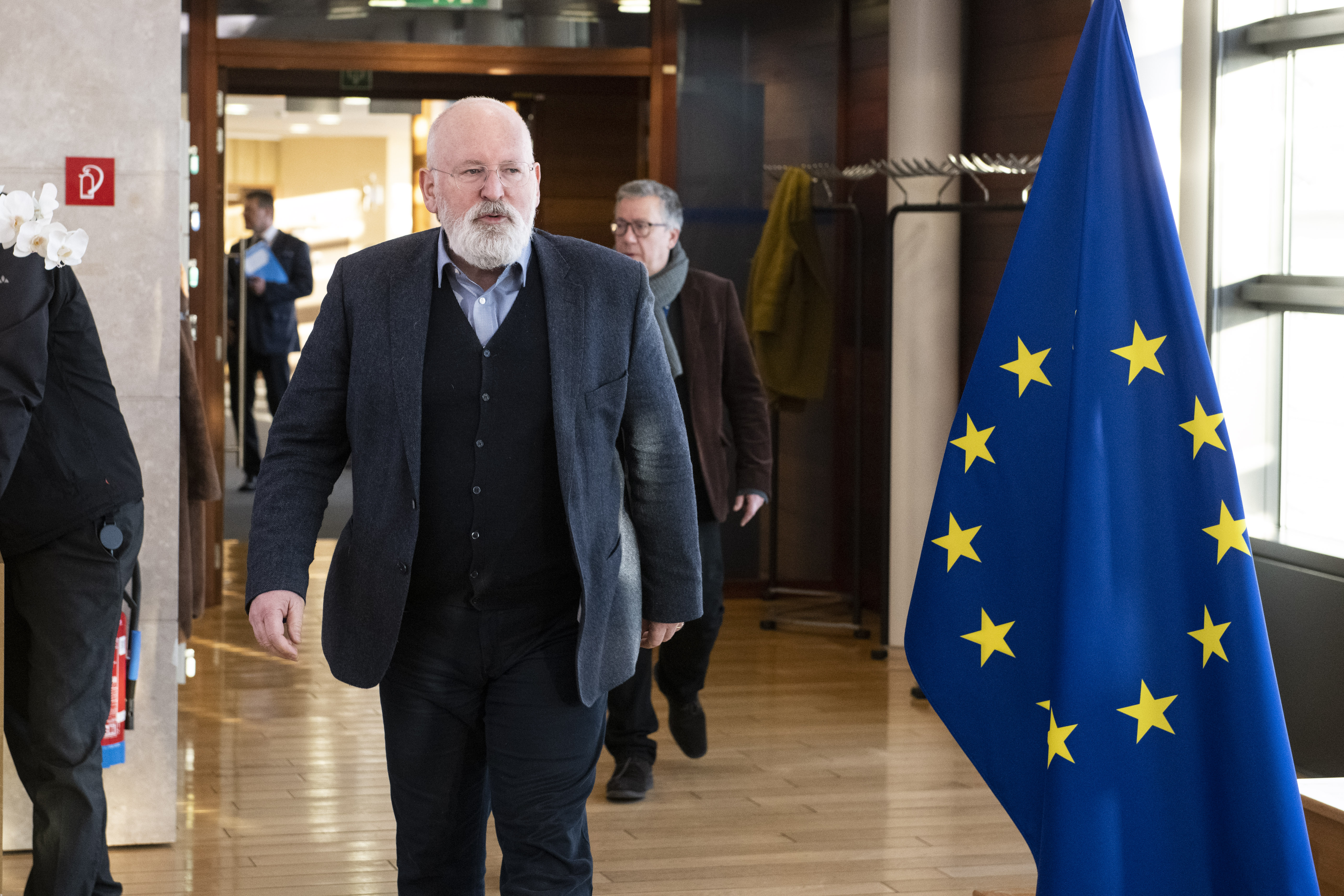
Executive Vice President of the European Commission for the European Green Deal Frans Timmermans

- 10 March 2020: The European Industrial Strategy was adopted (which is a plan for a future ready economy).
- 11 March 2020: There was a proposal for a Circular Economy Action Plan that focused on sustainable resource use.
- 20 May 2020: The 'Farm to fork strategy' was presented in order to increase the sustainability of food systems. The EU Biodiversity Strategy for 2030 was presented which focuses on the protection of fragile natural resources.
- 8 July 2020: Adoption of the EU strategies for energy system integration and hydrogen to pave the way towards a fully decarbonised, more efficient and interconnected energy sector.
- 12 July 2020: The taxonomy for sustainable activities comes into force, to reduce greenwashing and help investors choose green options.
- 17 September 2020: The 2030 Climate Target Plan was presented.
- 9 December 2020: The European Climate Pact was launched.
- 14 July 2021: The "Fit for 55" Package was presented by the European Commission, containing a large number of legislation proposals to achieve the EU Green Deal.
- 5 April 2022: Adoption of several initiatives under the action plan, including:
  - legislative proposal for substantiating green claims made by companies
  - review of requirements on packaging and packaging waste in the EU
  - new policy framework on bio-based, biodegradable and compostable plastics
  - measures to reduce the impact of microplastic pollution on the environment.
- 21 December 2024: The European Union Green Bonds Regulation comes into force, allowing the issue of "European Green Bond" (or "EuGB") by companies, regional or local authorities and EEA supra-nationals.

== Recovery program from COVID-19 ==
With the 2020 COVID-19 pandemic spreading rapidly within the European Union, the focus on the European Green Deal diminished. Many leaders including the deputy minister, Kowalski, from Poland, a Romanian politician, and the Czech prime minister, Babiš, suggested either a yearly pause or a complete discontinuation of the deal. Many believe the current main focus of the European Union's current policymaking process should be the immediate, shorter-term crisis rather than climate change.

The financial market being under immense stress along with a reduction in economic activity is another factor threatening to derail the European Green Deal. Public and private funds for the policy as well as the EU's GDP being affected by COVID-19 both hinder the budgeting for the policy to take action.

However, as recovery processes have begun within the European Union, a large majority of ministers are supporting the push for the deal to begin, alongside the subsiding of the first wave of infections. Representatives from 17 governments signed a letter in mid-April pushing for the deal to continue as a "response to the economic crisis while transforming Europe into a sustainable and climate neutral economy."

In April 2020, the European Parliament called for including the European Green Deal in its economic recovery program. Ten countries urged the European Union to adopt the "green recovery plan" as fears grew that the economic hit caused by the COVID-19 pandemic could weaken action on climate change.

In May 2020 the leaders of the European Commission argued that the ecological crisis helped create the pandemic, which emphasised the need to advance the European Green Deal. Later that month, the €750 billion European recovery package (called Next Generation EU) and the €1 trillion budget were announced. The European Green Deal is part of it. The money will be spent only on projects that meet certain green criteria. 25% of all funding will go to climate change mitigation. Fossil fuels and Nuclear power are excluded from the funding. The recovery package is also intended to restore some equilibrium between rich and poor countries in the European Union.

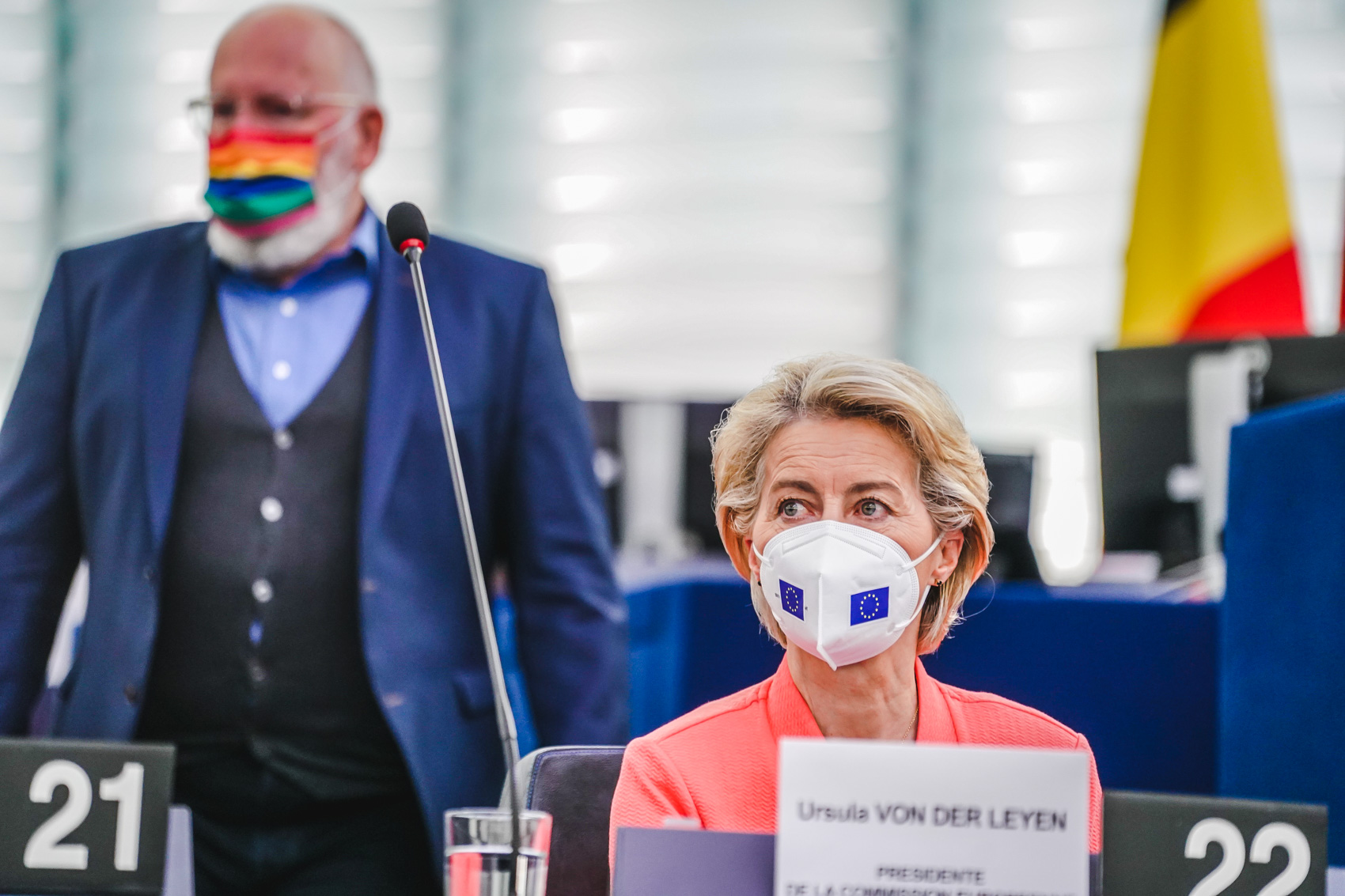
Frans Timmermans and Ursula von der Leyen in 2021

As part of the European Union response to the COVID-19 pandemic, several economic programs were set up, including the CRII, CRII+, European Social Fund+ and REACT-EU With these programs, flexibility is maintained, and CRII and CRII+ are also able to direct money to crisis repair measures through the European Regional Development Fund (ERDF), European Social Fund (ESF), Fund for European Aid to Most Deprived (FEAD) or the European Social Fund Plus. Some of these programs (such as REACT-EU) also serve to invest in the European Green Deal.

In July 2020, a proposed "Green Recovery Act" in the United Kingdom was published by a think tank and academic group, implementing all recommendations of a "Green New Deal" for Europe (which is distinct from the EU Green Deal) and drawing attention to the fact that "car manufacturers in Europe are far behind China" in ending fossil fuel-based production.

The same month, the recovery package and the budget of the European Union were agreed by EU leaders. The portion of the money that was allocated for climate action grew to 30%. The plan includes some green taxation on European products and on imports, but critics say it is still not enough for achieving the climate targets of the European Union and it is not clear how to ensure that all the money will really go to green projects.

== Burden of transition ==
The "Just Transition Mechanism", expects to distribute the burden of transitioning to a greener economy more fairly. This policy means that countries that have more workers in coal and oil shale sectors, as well as those with higher greenhouse emissions, will receive more financial aid. According to Frans Timmermans, this mechanism will also make investment more accessible for those most affected, as well as offering a support package, which will be worth "at least 100 billion euros". The Mechanism, a part of the Sustainable Europe Investment Plan, is expected to mobilize €100 billion in investments during the 2021-2027 Multiannual Financial Framework (MFF), with funding from the EU budget and Member States, as well as contributions from InvestEU and the European Investment Bank.

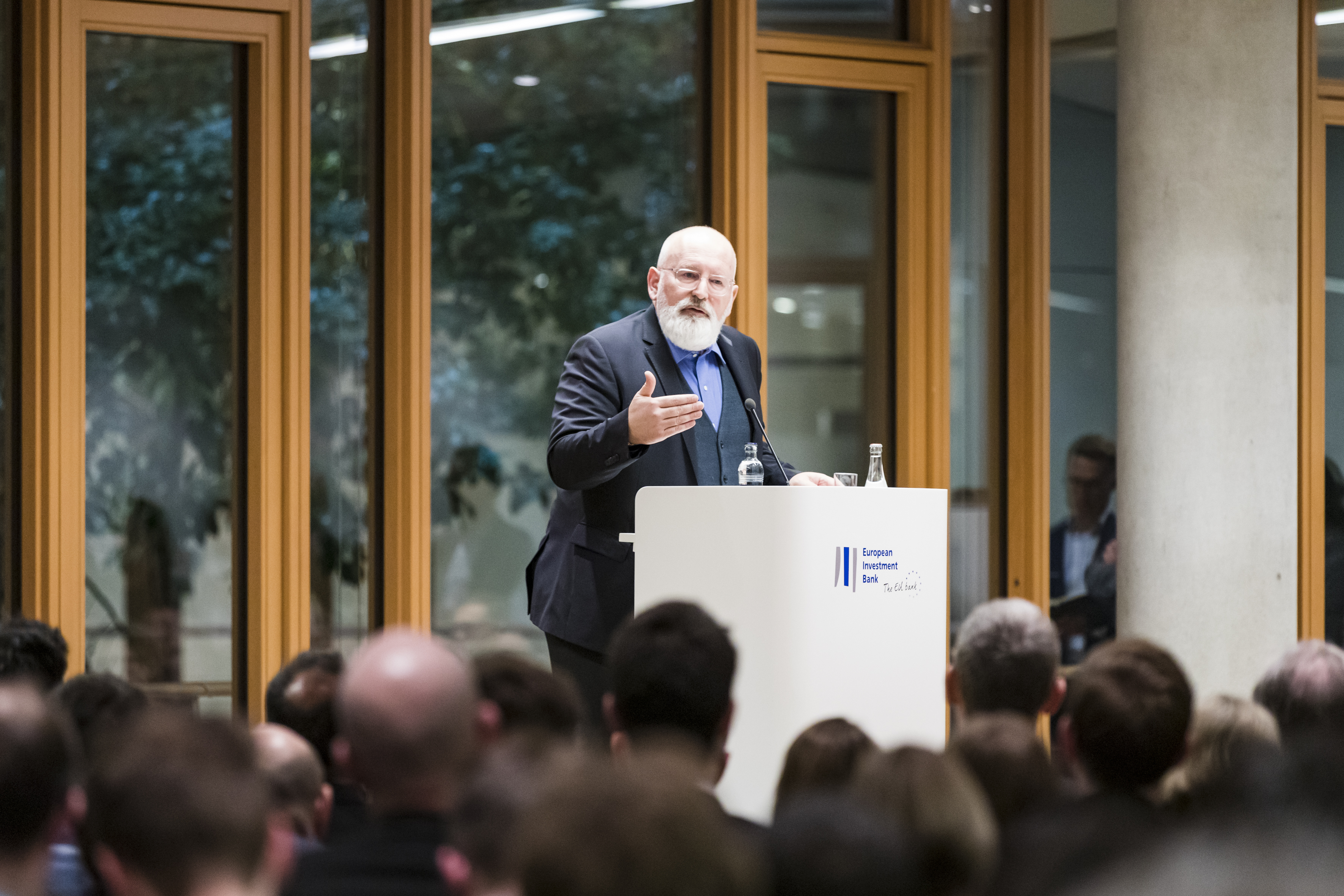
Timmermans delivering a speech about the Green Deal at the European Investment Bank Headquarters

The Just Transition Mechanism provides a comprehensive set of support options for the most vulnerable regions. The Just Transition Fund, the first pillar, will provide €17.5 billion in EU grants available to the most affected territories, implying a national co-financing requirement of around €10 billion. The second pillar creates a specialized transition plan under InvestEU to leverage private investment. Finally, a new public sector credit facility is formed under the third pillar to leverage public finance. These measures will be accompanied by specialized advisory and technical assistance for the affected regions and projects.

The European Investment Bank Group will be able to support this through Structural Programme Loans in conjunction with European structural and investment funds (ESIF) co-financing operations.

At COP26, the European Investment Bank announced a set of just transition common principles agreed upon with multilateral development banks, which also align with the Paris Agreement. The principles refer to focusing financing on the transition to net zero carbon economies, while keeping socioeconomic effects in mind, along with policy engagement and plans for inclusion and gender equality, all aiming to deliver long-term economic transformation. Until 2030, the European Investment Bank announced that it is prepared to mobilise $1 trillion for climate action.

== Criticism ==
=== Lobbyism ===
It has been found that lobbying by American oil company ExxonMobil had a significant impact on the early negotiations of the European Green Deal. ExxonMobil attempted to change the deal in a way that puts less emphasis on the importance of reducing transport that emits carbon dioxide.

=== Falling short ===
The current proposals have been criticised for falling short of the goal of ending fossil fuels, or being sufficient for a green recovery after the COVID-19 pandemic. Greenpeace has argued that the deal is not drastic enough and that it will fail to slow down climate change to an acceptable degree. The Corporate Europe Observatory calls the Deal a positive first step, but criticizes the influence the fossil fuel industry had on it. In addition, many groups such as "Greenpeace", "Friends of the Earth Europe" and the "Institute for European Environmental Policy" have all analysed the policy and believe it isn't "ambitious enough." Greenpeace believes the plan is "too little too late" whilst the IEEP stated that most prospects of meeting policy objectives "lacked clear or adequate" goals for the problem areas. Greta Thunberg commented on governments opposing the deal, saying "It seems to have turned into some kind of opportunity for countries to negotiate loopholes and to avoid raising their ambition".

=== Environmental effects of electric cars ===
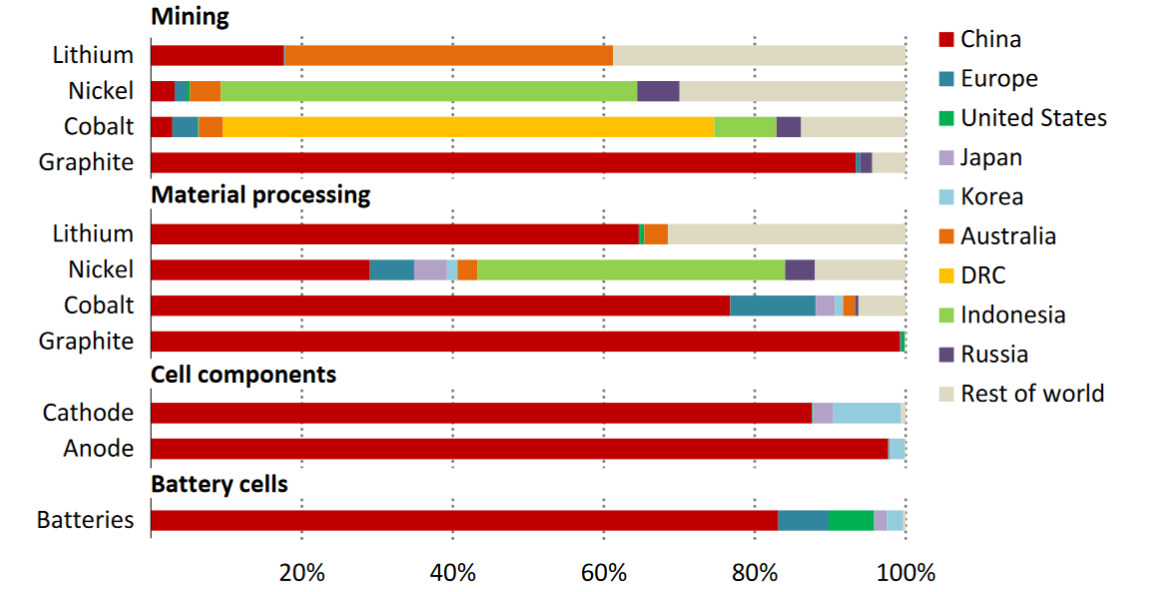
Geographical distribution of the global battery supply chain

Nickel and cobalt are the basic commodities used in almost every electric vehicle battery. Open-pit nickel mining has led to environmental degradation and pollution in developing countries such as the Philippines and Indonesia. In 2024, nickel mining and processing was one of the main causes of deforestation in Indonesia. Open-pit cobalt mining has led to deforestation and habitat destruction in the Democratic Republic of Congo.

The European Environmental Bureau and Friends of the Earth Europe published a report analysing the European Green deal. According to the report, it will not be enough to change energy sources for reaching a sustainable society because EVs, wind, solar energy require a high rate of resource consumption while the mining process is associated with high societal and environmental damage. The report says: "With respect to environmental impacts from resource use, the EU uses between 70% and 97% of the 'safe operating space' available for the whole world. This means the EU alone is close to exceeding the planetary boundaries for resource use impacts, beyond which the stable functioning of the earth's biophysical systems are in jeopardy." The report proposes to go beyond the ambition of the European Green Deal by, among others, creating binding targets for reducing resource consumption, shrinking economic sectors with little or no societal benefits (military, aerospace, fast fashion, cars), protecting areas and people from mining, and creating a sharing economy.

During 2021, a series of mass protests broke out in Serbia against the construction of a lithium mine in Western Serbia by the Rio Tinto corporation. In January 2022, the Serbian government revoked licences for the Jadar mining project. On 19 July 2024, following EU pressure, Serbian President Aleksandar Vučić, German Chancellor Olaf Scholz and Maroš Šefčovič, the European Commission Vice-President and "overseer" of the European Green Deal, met and signed an agreement regarding the European Union's access to "critical raw materials" mined in Serbia, representing a further step towards facilitating the Jadar project. If completed, the project could supply 90% of Europe's current lithium needs. The project resulted in renewed environmental protests in Serbia in 2024.

=== Pressure on ecosystems ===
In 2024, over 60 NGOs sent a letter to the European Union expressing a concern about the bioeconomy concept "explicitly referenced in the European Green Deal". According to the organizations, it puts strong pressure on ecosystems, while in the same European Green Deal, one of the targets is to protect 30% of land and waters and to restore ecosystems. The authors argue that "moving from fossil to bio sources without embedding it in a wider socio-ecological transformation and drastically reducing consumption would be a disaster."

A detailed plan for the EU's CBAM was leaked in June 2021 and officially presented a month later as part of the European Green Deal. The proposal sparked strong opposition from major trading partners, including China, India, Japan, and the United States. Research suggests that CBAM-type measures may be especially challenging for developing countries, particularly China, due to the high share of energy-intensive products in its exports.

=== Job losses and inflation ===
EU Carbon Border Adjustment Mechanism not adjusting exports could reduce the competitiveness of exporting industries and contributes to deindustrialization. July 2025 the Commission announced a plan to mitigate this risk.

Between 2019 and 2023, the EU recorded more than 853,000 job losses in manufacturing, including the automotive industry, with the largest losses in Poland, the Czech Republic, Romania and Germany. Trade unions warned that the European Green Deal will put 11 million jobs at risk. The Commission predicts that 180,000 jobs could be lost in the coal mining industry by 2030. A 2021 study estimates that the automotive industry could lose half a million jobs. According to a 2019 study, up to 41,000 jobs could be lost within Poland, with the Czech Republic, Bulgaria and Romania also having a possible loss of 10,000 jobs each.

The EU's carbon pricing scheme for road and heating fuels (ETS2), fully operational in 2027, will lead to an increase in the price of fossil fuels such as heating gas, petrol and diesel.

The European Green Deal could reduce Europe's agricultural production and increase global food prices.

In July 2023, European People's Party (EPP) leader Manfred Weber tried to block the Nature Restoration Law, saying it would destroy farmers' livelihoods and threaten food security.

Former Romanian president, Traian Băsescu, has warned that the deal could lead to some EU members to push towards an exit from the union. While some European states are on their way to eliminating the use of coal as a source of energy, many others still rely heavily on it. This scenario demonstrates how the deal may appeal to some states more than others. The economic impact of the deal is likely to be unevenly spread among EU states. This was highlighted by Polish MEP, Ryszard Legutko, who asked, "is the Commission trying to seize power from the member states?". Poland, the Czech Republic and Hungary, three states that depend mostly on coal for energy, were the most opposed to the deal.

=== 2021–2023 global energy crisis ===
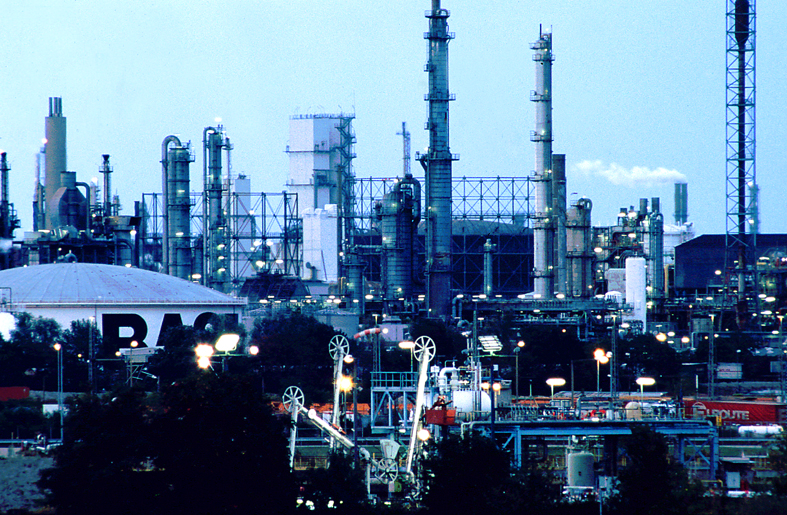
The German chemical company BASF was forced to cut production

Due to a combination of unfavourable conditions, which involved soaring demand of natural gas, its diminished supply from Russia and Norway to the European markets, less power generation by renewable energy sources such as wind, water and solar energy, and cold winter that left European and Russian gas reservoirs depleted, Europe faced steep increases in gas prices in 2021. Hungarian Prime Minister Viktor Orbán blamed a record-breaking surge in energy prices on the European Commission's Green Deal plans. Politico reported that "Despite the impact of high energy prices, [EU Commissioner for Energy] Simson insisted that there are no plans to backtrack on the bloc's Green Deal". European Commission President Ursula von der Leyen said that "Europe today is too reliant on gas and too dependent on gas imports. The answer has to do with diversifying our suppliers ... and, crucially, with speeding up the transition to clean energy."

Energy-intensive German industry and German exporters were hit particularly hard by the energy crisis.

=== 2024 European farmers' protests ===
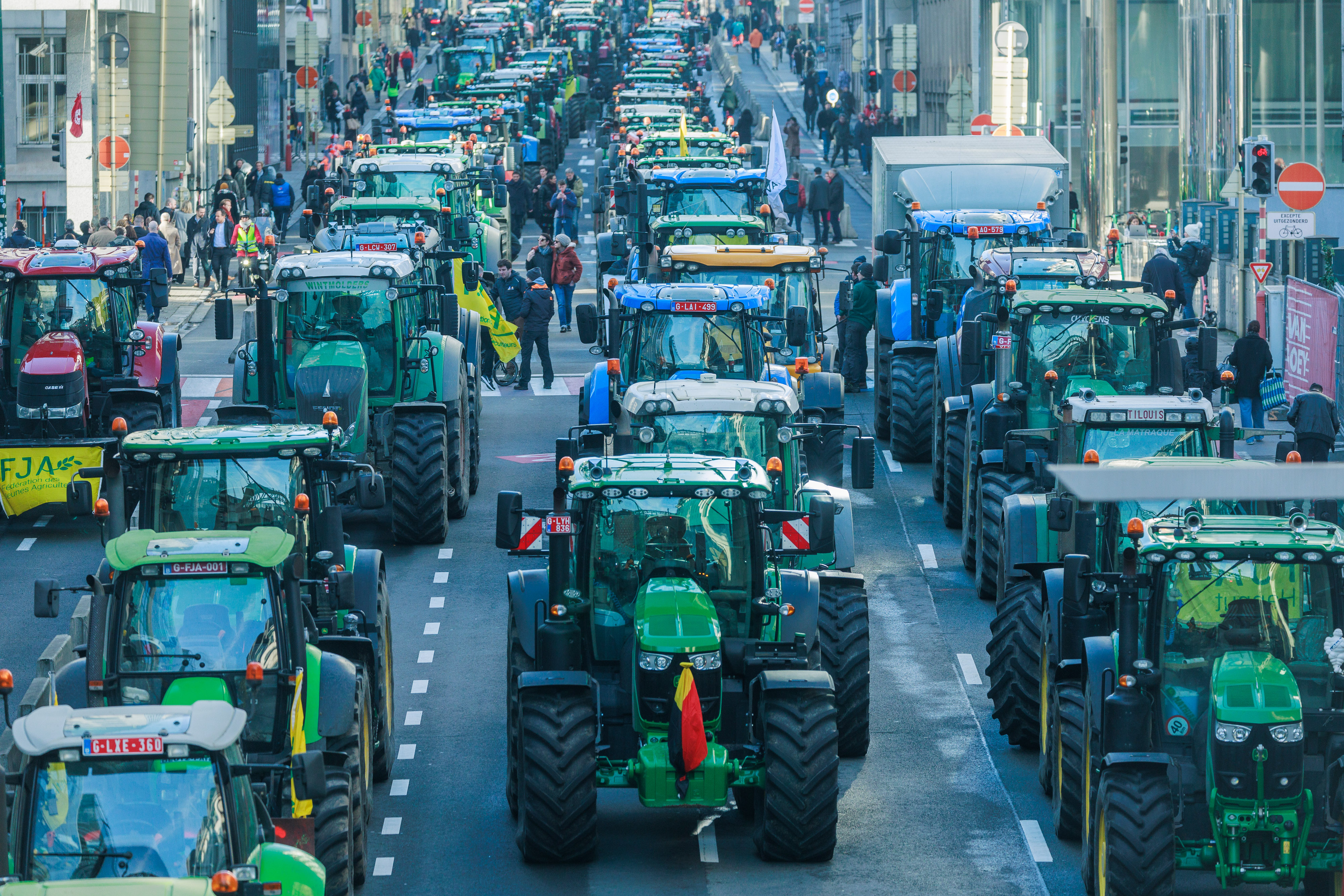
Farmers' protest in Brussels on 1 February 2024

European farmers have protested against proposed environmental regulations (such as a carbon tax, pesticide bans, nitrogen emissions curbs and restrictions on water and land usage), low food prices and trade in agricultural products with non-European Union member states, such as Ukraine and the Mercosur bloc of South America.

=== Emergence of Chinese vehicles on European market ===
As an indirect consequence of the Green Deal, Chinese electric vehicles from firms such as BYD have taken root in Europe. Owing to high costs of producing lithium batteries as well as European countries lagging behind in electric vehicles production, In 2023, Made in China products have been sold six times as much as four years prior in Europe, when the Green Deal was implemented. In 2022, 14% of cars EVs sold in Europe were Chinese-manufactured.

== History of opposition by countries ==
Although all EU leaders signed off on the European green deal in December 2019, disagreements in regards to the goals and their timeline to achieve each factor arose. Poland has stated that climate neutrality by 2050 will not be a possibility for their country due to their reliance on coal as their main power source. Their climate minister, Michał Kurtyka, declared that commitments and funds need to be more fairly allocated. The initiative to increase the goal of lowering carbon emissions split the EU, with the coal reliant countries such as Poland complaining it will affect "jobs and competitiveness." Czech Prime Minister, Andrej Babiš, stated that their nation will not reach the 2050 goal "without nuclear" association. Countries are also arguing over the Just Transition Fund (JTF) that aims to help countries who are reliant on coal to become more environmentally friendly. These countries that changed their impacts prior to the Policy, such as Spain, believe that the JTF is unfair as it only benefits the countries that didn't "go green earlier." The head of Brussels' office of the Open Europe think tank, Pieter Cleppe, further dismissed the plan with sarcastic comment, "What could possibly go wrong."

Poland's Prime Minister Mateusz Morawiecki said that the EU's carbon pricing system unfairly disadvantages poorer countries in Southern and Eastern Europe. Speaking at the COP26 climate summit in Glasgow, Czech Prime Minister Babiš denounced the European Green Deal, saying that the European Union "can achieve nothing without the participation of the largest polluters such as China or the USA that are responsible for 27 and 15 percent, respectively, of global CO_{2} emissions."

In August 2023, the Polish government filed a series of complaints with the Court of Justice of the European Union (CJEU) against provisions that are part of the Fit for 55 package, claiming that three EU climate policies threaten Poland's economy and energy security. In February 2024, responding to protests by Polish farmers, Polish Prime Minister Donald Tusk declared that he would advocate for changes in the European Green Deal. In March 2024, Tusk insisted that Poland would go its own way "without European coercion".

Italian Prime Minister Giorgia Meloni criticized the EU ban on the sale of new petrol and diesel cars from 2035 that would "condemn [Europe] to new strategic dependencies, such as China's electric [vehicles]." Meloni said, "Reducing polluting emissions is the path we want to follow, but with common sense."

== Analysis ==
A meta-analysis from 2023 reported results about "required technology-level investment shifts for climate-relevant infrastructure until 2035" within the EU, and found these are "most drastic for power plants, electricity grids and rail infrastructure", ~87€ billion above the planned budgets in the near-term (2021–25), and in need of sustainable finance policies.

The European Union Emissions Trading System should be expanded to more sectors is proposed in a paper from Bruegel.

In May 2024, a report has been published, summarizing the main achievements of the European Union in the environmental domain from 2019, with an emphasis on the green new deal. The report says that without this set of policies, the environmental situation was worse but the world is still on track to 2.9 degrees warming.

Research from the Our Land and Water National Science Challenge on New Zealand agricultural exports revealed the European Green Deal posed significant challenges. New Zealand at the time had no National Organic Standard comparable with the EU, and banned only 27 chemicals and pesticides, compared with the EU's 195. Without policy change, this could reduce access to the EU market for New Zealand exporters.

A scientific study published in 2026 explores the transformation to climate neutrality in hundreds of scenarios that vary key uncertainties. Across these scenarios, the study finds that the EU would need to cut net greenhouse gas emissions by around 86 % by 2040 relative to 1990. According to the study, the two main pillars to realise this transformation in a cost-efficient way are the expansion of renewable electricity, and the electrification of energy demands. Electricity generation from wind and solar would expand seven-fold compared to 2018–2022 levels, and electricity would supply nearly half of final energy demand by 2040, representing a strong electrification of transport, buildings, and industry. The analysis further shows that demand for natural gas and crude oil could be about 60 % lower by 2040 than in recent years, strengthening Europe’s energy independence.

== Artistic movement ==
The New European Bauhaus is an artistic movement initiated by the European Commission, more precisely by the President of the European Commission, Mrs. Ursula von der Leyen herself. Its aim is to implement the European Green Deal through culture by integrating esthetics, sustainability and inclusiveness.

The New European Bauhaus (NEB) is an interdisciplinary movement which intends to re-express the fundamental ambitions of the historical Bauhaus movement generated by the German architect Walter Gropius, in order to deal with contemporary issues from the fields of creation: art, crafts, design, architecture and urban planning.

The New European Bauhaus being "new" it is currently still being developed by a multicultural and international Research Committee headed by an artist, Alexandre Dang.

However the name who has been chosen is strongly criticized in some artistic communities as being "inherently not inclusive".

=== Phases ===
This movement wanting to be as open and accessible as possible, this will be facilitated by a planification in three phases: the Design phase (2020-2021), the Delivery phase (2021-2023+) and the Dissemination phase (2023-2024+).

==== The Design phase ====
As a first step, the Design phase was about finding methods that could boost existing ideas related to the NEB's challenges, regarding culture and technology. These two notions are considered by the New European Bauhaus as determinant elements to face contemporary concerns, especially in architecture and urban planning sectors. By launching a call for proposals, acceleration services and financial contribution started to be provided to some projects under European Union funding programs, such as Horizon Europe or LIFE programme, but also international organisations.

In the idea of a collective design dynamic, a "High-level roundtable" has been set up with 18 thinkers and practitioners, involving for example famous architects Shigeru Ban and Bjark Ingels, the President of the Italian National Innovation Fund Francesca Bria, the activist and academic Sheela Patel, and others.

==== The Delivery phase ====
After the Design phase, the Communication of the European Commission "New European Bauhaus Beautiful, Sustainable, Together" was released on 15 September 2021. The detailed content of this communication directly led to the Delivery phase, which began by setting up five pilots projects. These projects were selected as flagship proposals for the NEB's announced goal: "a sustainable green transformation in housing, architecture, transportation, urban, and rural spaces as part of its effort to reach carbon neutrality by 2050". In fact, one of the fundamental points of the New European Bauhaus, that is put forward by the European Commission, is to translate the European Green Deal, officially approved in 2020, to make it a tangible cultural experience in which citizens from all around the world could participate.

Referring to the major principles of the original Bauhaus movement, the NEB initiative wants to be multi-level: "from global to local, participatory and transdisciplinary". By initiating a co-design process, views and experiences of thousands of citizens, professionals and organisations across the EU, and beyond, were involved into open conversations. Emerging from this collective thinking, the three terms highlighted to define the movement are "Sustainability" (including climate goals, circularity, zero pollution and biodiversity), "Aesthetics" (quality of experience and style, beyond functionality) and "Inclusion" (including diversity first, securing accessibility and affordability). The four thematic axes chosen to guide the NEB's implementation for the next years are "Reconnecting with nature", "Regaining a sense of belonging", "Prioritising the places and people that need it most", and "Fostering long term, life cycle thinking in the industrial ecosystem". The three levels of interconnected transformations expected from the initiative are "changes in places around us", "changes in the environment that enable innovation" and "changes in the diffusion of new meanings".

==== The Dissemination phase ====
During the Dissemination phase, the New European Bauhaus planned to focus on spreading chosen ideas and concepts to a broader audience, not only inside the EU. Within the three-phases development, this last step should be about networking and sharing knowledge between practitioners on available methods, solutions and prototypes, but also, it is meant to help creators to replicate their experiences across cities, rural areas and localities and to influence the new generation of architects and designers.

=== New European Bauhaus prizes ===
In spring 2021, the European Commission launched New European Bauhaus prizes to reward inspiring examples of the realizations fitting the NEB principles. For the first edition of the contest, Commissioners Ferreira and Gabriel awarded 20 projects in a ceremony in Brussels on 16 September 2021. A second edition of NEB prizes is taking place in 2022.

=== The NEB LAB ===
The NEB LAB, or New European Bauhaus Laboratory, has been established as a meeting space to work with the New European Bauhaus growing community, which is more than 450 official partners, High-Level Roundtable members, Contact Points of the national governments, and winners and finalists of the New European Bauhaus prizes. The NEB LAB's main objective is to put the movement's thinking into practice, by co-creating and testing solutions and policy actions, like the development of labeling tools. It has started with a "Call for Friends of the New European Bauhaus", in order to get public entities, companies and political organisations involved.

=== The New European Bauhaus Festival ===
The opening of a New European Bauhaus Festival has been announced by the European Commission to allow visibility for creators, to encourage them to "showcase" their ideas and share their progress, but also to enable networking and to foster citizen engagement. It will stand on three pillars: Fair (presentation of completed projects or products), Fest (the cultural section, with artists and performance) and Forum (debates with innovative participatory formats).

Its first edition will take place on 9–12 June 2022 in Brussels. Based on this experience, the commission will draw up a concept for a yearly event that will include places in and outside the EU from 2023 onwards.

== See also ==
- A Green New Deal
- Anti-Waste and Circular Economy Law
- Build Back Better Plan
- Carbon neutrality
- EU Allowance
- EU Chemicals Strategy for Sustainability Towards a Toxic-Free Environment
- COVID-19 economic recovery programmes
- Energy law
- Environmental impact of agriculture
- Green economy
- Paris Agreement
- Sustainable finance

== Sources ==
- (COM/2019/640 final) COMMUNICATION FROM THE COMMISSION TO THE EUROPEAN PARLIAMENT, THE EUROPEAN COUNCIL, THE COUNCIL, THE EUROPEAN ECONOMIC AND SOCIAL COMMITTEE AND THE COMMITTEE OF THE REGIONS — The European Green Deal
- (COM/2020/21 final) COMMUNICATION FROM THE COMMISSION TO THE EUROPEAN PARLIAMENT, THE COUNCIL, THE EUROPEAN ECONOMIC AND SOCIAL COMMITTEE AND THE COMMITTEE OF THE REGIONS — Sustainable Europe Investment Plan / European Green Deal Investment Plan
