= Fit for 55 =

European Union climate change-related package

Fit for 55 is a package by the European Union designed to reduce the European Union's greenhouse gas emissions by 55% by 2030. It is part of the union's European Green Deal, first presented in December 2019.

The package was proposed by the European Commission in July 2021. After being tabled in 2021, the plans were passed in 2023. Measures include additional support for clean transport, renewable energy, and a tariff called the Carbon Border Adjustment Mechanism on emissions for high-carbon imports from countries lacking sufficient greenhouse gas reduction measures of their own. It proposes to extend the European Union Emissions Trading System to transport and heat. Compared to the net-zero scenario from the International Energy Agency, the plan contains more measures to ensure that energy remains affordable.

As of August 2024, all Fit for 55 proposals had been adopted by the European Parliament and the Council, except the Energy Taxation Directive.

== Legislation ==
The legislation is complicated due to the high level of democratic processes in the European Union. The Commission sent proposals of the new law to the council and European Parliament. The Council started discussions including representatives of all 27 member states on the legislative proposals in working parties on an expert level. Based on that exchange the Permanent Representative Committee continues discussions preparing the ground for the council meeting of ministers. The Fit for 55 package proposals are discussed in multiple council formations such as environment, energy, transport, economy and finance. After the ministers of each branch found joint positions trilogues including meetings with representatives of the council, parliament and commission start. The larger part of the proposals stick to the regular legislative process of trilogues.

== Aspects ==
- Emissions trade
- Social climate fund
- Carbon border adjustment mechanism
- Members emission reduction
- Land use and forestry
- Transportation CO_{2} standards
- Methane reduction
- Alternative fuels
- Green energy
- Energy efficiency
- Sustainable buildings
- Hydrogen
- Energy taxation

== Process ==
When the bill for carbon market legislation was designed, the conservative fraction in the European Parliament initially weakened the bill. The amended bill was defeated as the social democrats voted against. The final accepted compromise became stronger in CO_{2} emission reduction than the proposal from the European Commission.

== Criticism ==
The environmental organization Greenpeace criticized the package for not being suitable for halting global warming and the associated destruction of important life-support systems because the target envisaged was too low. The organization criticized the classification of bioenergy as renewable energy and the sale of non-emission-free cars by 2035.

In August 2023, the Polish government filed a series of complaints with the European Court of Justice against provisions that are part of the Fit for 55 package, claiming that EU climate policies threaten Poland's economy and energy security.

== Employment impact ==
The EU's Fit for 55 climate package is projected to create a net 204,000 jobs by 2030, adding to the baseline growth of 6.7 million jobs. Employment effects will vary by region, with negative impacts likely in eastern Europe due to reliance on carbon-intensive industries, and positive impacts in regions with green energy infrastructure.

== See also ==
- Climate change in Europe#Climate targets
- European green deal
