= Jadar mine =

Mine in Serbia

- Location: Loznica, Mačva District, Serbia
- Products: Lithium, boron
- Discovered: 2004

The Jadar mining project is a proposed mining site to be operated by Rio Tinto. The deposit is one of the largest lithium deposits in the world and also contains boron. It is planned that both lithium and boron will be recovered from the ore. The deposit contains the mineral jadarite, the only occurrence of this mineral in the world. The mine is located in western Serbia in Mačva District. The Jadar mine has reserves amounting to 118 million tonnes of ore grading 1.8% lithium oxide. The deposit was discovered in 2004.

The Serbian government revoked licences for the Jadar project in January 2022 after large environmental protests.

In January 2024, President of Serbia Aleksandar Vučić stated that the government wants to hold further talks with Rio Tinto and that there should be more public discussion over whether the project should go ahead. If completed, the project could supply 90% of Europe's current lithium needs and help to make Rio Tinto a leading lithium producer.

The project resulted in renewed environmental protests, starting in July 2024 when the Supreme Court of Serbia ruled that Belgrade's decision to revoke Rio Tinto's license for the project in 2022 was unconstitutional. One week later, Serbian Minister of Mining and Energy Dubravka Đedović signed a memorandum with Maroš Šefčovič, Vice-President and "overseer" of the European Green Deal, agreeing on the basis of critical raw materials, battery value chains, and electric vehicles related to the mining project. The project has strong backing from the EU especially, with German Chancellor Olaf Scholz calling it a "good project for Serbia" and "an important European project." Proponents also claim that the mining project would "push Serbia closer to the EU and help reduce the EU's dependency on China for lithium."

The mine is set to open no sooner than 2028.
