= Srđan Nogo =

Serbian politician

- Срђан Ного
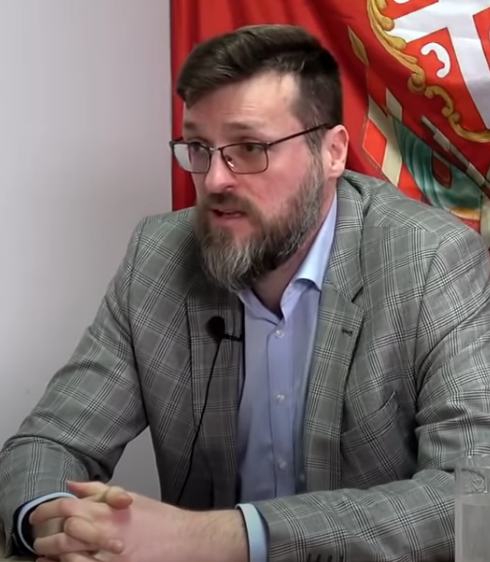

Member of the National Assembly of the Republic of Serbia
- In office 3 June 2016 – 3 August 2020

Personal details
- Born: 1981 (age 44–45) Belgrade, SR Serbia, SFR Yugoslavia
- Party: Dveri (2011–19); Independent (2019–present)
- Education: University of Belgrade
- Occupation: Politician
- Website: srdjannogo.rs

Srđan Nogo (Serbian Cyrillic: Срђан Ного; born 1981) is a Serbian politician. He was a prominent member of the right-wing Dveri party for several years until his expulsion in February 2019. In August 2020, he was arrested in Belgrade and charged with inciting sedition under article 309 of the Criminal Code of Serbia.

Nogo has been described in the Serbian media as holding extreme right-wing views.

== Early life and career ==
Nogo was born in Belgrade, in what was then the Socialist Republic of Serbia in the Socialist Federal Republic of Yugoslavia. His father was a professor at the University of Belgrade, and his mother was a journalist. In his youth, he played basketball for KK Partizan. He graduated from the University of Belgrade Faculty of Law with a focus on international law, joined the journal Dveri Srpske in 2008, and was a founding member of the Dveri organization in 2011.

== Politician ==
=== Early years (2011–16) ===
Nogo was a featured speaker at a May 2011 rally in support of Ratko Mladić in Banja Luka, Republika Srpska, Bosnia and Herzegovina, held after the former Bosnian Serb military leader's arrest in Serbia on war crimes charges. Nogo was quoted as saying, "There are more Mladićs in Serbia, they grow and will continue where he stopped." Two years later, he announced that Dveri would seek to bring criminal charges against Serbian government representatives who negotiated the 2013 Brussels Agreement, which normalized some aspects of Serbia's relations with Kosovo.

Nogo received the tenth position on Dveri's electoral list in the 2012 Serbian parliamentary election and the eighth position on its list in the 2014 parliamentary election. He also appeared in the second position on the party's list for the City Assembly of Belgrade in the 2012 Serbian local elections. The party did not cross the electoral threshold to win assembly representation in any of these campaigns.

=== Parliamentarian (2016–20) ===
Dveri contested the 2016 parliamentary election in an alliance with the Democratic Party of Serbia (DSS). Nogo received the third position on their combined list and was elected when the list won thirteen mandates. The Serbian Progressive Party (SNS) and its allies won a majority victory in the election, and Dveri served in opposition. During his time in parliament, Nogo was a member of the committee on the rights of the child, a deputy member of the health and family committee and the committee on human and minority rights and gender equality, and a member of the parliamentary friendship groups with Belarus, China, Greece, Kazakhstan, and Russia.

Nogo also received the fifth position on a combined DSS–Dveri list for the Savski Venac municipal assembly in the 2016 Serbian local elections, which were held concurrently with the parliamentary election. The list won two mandates, and he was not elected.

Nogo was the leader of Dveri's Belgrade city board during this period. The party contested the 2018 city assembly election in an alliance with the Enough Is Enough (DJB) association, and Nogo appeared on their combined electoral list in the largely ceremonial 110th and final position. The list failed to win any seats. Nogo was removed as chair of the city board shortly thereafter. He was later removed from the Dveri presidency in October 2018 after saying that Serbian prime minister Ana Brnabić should be hanged if she signed the Dublin Regulation on allowing asylum seekers into the country.

Along with several other opposition parties, Dveri began boycotting the national assembly and Serbia's electoral institutions in early 2019, accusing Serbian president Aleksandar Vučić and the SNS of undermining democracy in the country. Party members, including Nogo, participated in various anti-government protests.

Nogo was expelled from Dveri on 19 February 2019, after bringing a gimmick noose to a protest event and calling on the police to arrest him. Nogo said that his expulsion was illegal. This notwithstanding, he formally left the Dveri parliamentary group on 23 April 2019.

=== Since 2020 ===
Nogo was one of the most prominent leaders of the 2020 COVID-19 protests and riots in Serbia. These events occurred during and against the backdrop of the 2020 parliamentary election, of which he supported a boycott. After the new members of Serbia's national assembly were sworn in on 3 August 2020, Nogo (who no longer had parliamentary immunity) and another former Dveri politician were arrested and charged with inciting sedition under article 309 of the Criminal Code of Serbia.

In a November 2020 broadcast, Nogo said that Aleksandar Vučić and his entire family would meet a "tragic end." This statement was strongly criticized in the Serbian media.

During the 2022 Serbian constitutional referendum, Nogo broke a ballot box after voting and was detained and arrested. He stated that his act was a "political performance" rather than a criminal offense.

Nogo was arrested again in November 2022, after writing on Twitter that Aleksandar Vučić and Vladimir Đukanović should shout "Long Live Serbia!" before a firing squad. He was released a few days after, with an official admonition not to approach Vučić or Đukanović.

Online sources do not indicate that any of the charges brought against Nogo have resulted in a conviction.
