= 2024 Serbian environmental protests =

Protests in Serbia

- Date: 29 July 2024 – 17 December 2024 (4 months and 19 days)
- Location: Šabac, Barajevo, Kraljevo, Ljig, and Aranđelovac in Serbia
- Caused by: Reinstatement of Rio Tinto's mining licence, European Union access deal to Serbian raw materials
- Goals: Permanent halt to all mining operations in Jadar
- Methods: Demonstrations
- Status: Protest continues as part of wider anti-corruption demonstrations

Parties
| Anti-government protesters: Citizens; Environmental activists; Nationalists; Serbian Orthodox Church factions; Opposition parties: Party of Freedom and Justice; People's Movement of Serbia; Green–Left Front; Serbia Centre; Democratic Party; Ecological Uprising; Movement of Free Citizens; Movement for Reversal; Together; People's Party; Union of ecological organisations of Serbia; "We don't give Jadar" movement; Kreni-Promeni; Eko-straža; People's patrol; "Moba" movement; Valjevo resistance movement | Government of Serbia: Serbian Progressive Party; Socialist Party of Serbia; Serbia Must Not Stop coalition; Police of Serbia; Pro-government activists; Support: European Union; Germany; France; United States |

Lead figures
| Aleksandar Jovanović Ćuta; Ratko Ristić | Aleksandar Vučić |

Number
| Thousands | |

In July 2024, a series of environmental protests began in Serbia against the Jadar mine, a European Union–backed and Serbian government-approved lithium mining project. The project was proposed by Anglo-Australian Rio Tinto to develop Europe's largest lithium mine in the West Serbian region of Jadar, causing significant backlash due to its potential environmental damage and exploitation of the local population for economic and geopolitical gain.

== Background ==
Lithium is a critical element needed for the production of batteries used in electric vehicles and mobile devices, and had significantly increased demand in the 2020s due to the global shift towards renewable energy and electric transportation, especially for the automotive industry. The European Union and the United States have designated lithium as a "strategically important resource".

Serbia is home to one of Europe's largest lithium reserves, located in the Jadar valley region of western Serbia with a population of about 18,000 people. The region contains wide stretches of diverse forest ecosystems, agricultural land, and water resources from the Jadar river. Many farmers live and work in the valley due to its fertile soil, with several families living in the region for generations. Multinational mining company Rio Tinto probed the region for several years and desired to launch efforts to excavate its large lithium supply to meet global demand for lithium.

Serbia's candidacy to join the European Union has been complicated due to its difficulties toward meeting its environmental standards, with Serbia being deemed one of Europe's most polluted nations.

== Prelude ==
In 2021 to 2022, widespread environmental protests across Serbia, which included blocking several high-traffic roads and bridges in Belgrade and other regions, led to the suspension of Rio Tinto's lithium mining project in the region. The Serbian Prime Minister at the time, Ana Brnabić, stated that "everything is finished" and that the project was "over". However, in early July 2024, Serbia's constitutional court overruled the prior cancellation of the US$2.4 billion mining project. The court claimed that the initial ruling was "not in accordance with the Constitution or the law" and reinstated the company's licence to mine in the region.

On 19 July 2024, following EU pressure, President of Serbia Aleksandar Vučić, Chancellor of Germany Olaf Scholz, and European Union energy chief Maroš Šefčovič met and signed an agreement regarding the European Union's access to "critical raw materials" mined in Serbia, representing a further step towards facilitating the Jadar mining project. The deal represented an effort by Europe to lower its dependency on China for essential minerals such as lithium, as well as aligning Serbia more closely with the EU instead of with Russia and China, especially in the context of Russia's invasion of Ukraine and China's diplomatic and economic partnership with Russia. Vučić claimed that the mine would "not endanger anyone or anything", and planned to grant locals "new jobs and better salaries".

== Protests ==
The reinstatement of Rio Tinto's mining licence triggered a new wave of indignation and protests across Serbia. Many environmentalists argued that the excavation would cause irreversible environmental damage to the agriculturally fertile Jadar valley, while offering limited benefits to Serbian citizens, especially locals in the region. Many emphasised the importance of preserving Serbia's natural resources and ecosystems over short-term economic gains, with Biljana Stepanovic, a representative of the Proglas rights organisation, stating that "we cannot live without clean air and water, but we can live without lithium batteries and electric cars". Locals and business owners feared that the project would pose an existential threat to local communities in the region.

One of the environmentalist groups called "Ne damo Jadar" (English: We won't give up Jadar) strictly opposed the plans and began to set up local protests starting in June 2024. Group representative and local farmer Zlatko Kokanovic stated:

"The plan is that the main processing plant will be here — just a few hundred meters away from our church. Between 4,000 and 5,000 tons of rock material will be crushed there daily, treated with 1,000 tons of sulfuric acid, and washed with huge amounts of water, which will then end up in the River Jadar"

— Zlatko Kokanovic, statement to Deutsche Welle (DW)

The group feared that the resulting landfills and pollution would devastate the ecosystem, poison the river's water supply, destroy agricultural farmland, and introduce toxic particles into the air, causing significant increases in disease and cancer rates.

He also condemned Germany's role in pushing the project forward at the expense of Serbian farmers and locals, retorting:

"There is three times more lithium in Germany, Mr. Scholz, and it is found in underground thermal waters where it is much simpler to exploit and where there would be much less impact on the environment. Go ahead, mine your lithium in Germany."
"We will not chase them around Belgrade and have no intention of wasting our strength and energy because it is clearly the plan and goal of this government to arrest us and put us behind bars. We will not allow them to do that."

— Zlatko Kokanovic, statement to Deutsche Welle (DW)

=== Political opposition ===
Opposition MP and environmentalist Aleksandar Jovanović Ćuta called the approved mining plan "an epic crime against people and nature". He referred to German Chancellor Olaf Scholz as a "little American puppet" who was content with displacing the citizens living in Gornje Nedeljice that "feed Serbia". He further stated:

"Let Scholz and Sevcovic come to Zlatko Kokanovic and tell him: 'Look, Zlatko, I want lithium. The condition for that is you and your 100,000 liters of milk production disappear, and you move from your field.' Could he say that to a German farmer?"
"We are dealing with a company that no normal country would welcome, but that's why they found Aleksandar Vučić, a great brave fighter, who does not have the courage to defend his people but put himself in the service of Rio Tinto."

— Aleksandar Jovanović Ćuta, statement to Deutsche Welle (DW)

He warned the government that if they did not outlaw the mining operations and future exploitation of raw materials, that the locals would start "a rebellion".

=== Rallies ===
On 29 July 2024, thousands of protesters gathered in the city of Šabac, located approximately 50 kilometres northeast of the proposed mine site. Protesters in Šabac marched through the town, with many waving Serbian flags.

Demonstrations simultaneously occurred in the central Serbian towns of Barajevo, Kraljevo, Ljig, and Aranđelovac. In Kraljevo, activist Nebojsa Kovandzic rallied protesters around the claim that the Serbian government was prioritising its interests towards economic and diplomatic opportunities over those of the citizens. Many environmental groups threatened to escalate future protests, announcing plans to block major railroads and junctions in August 2024 as a form of civil disobedience.

== Response ==
German Chancellor Olaf Scholz attempted to assure protesters by suggesting that the project would only proceed if it complied with EU environmental standards, which was generally met with scepticism from protesters and environmental groups.

In response to escalating protests, Serbian President Vučić announced that the government would set up a referendum on the project by the end of 2025. Vučić also stated that no operations would begin before 2028, and would make sure to follow environmental guidelines stringently before construction started.
