= Gornje Nedeljice =

Gornje Nedeljice Горње Недељице (Serbian)
- Village (Selo)
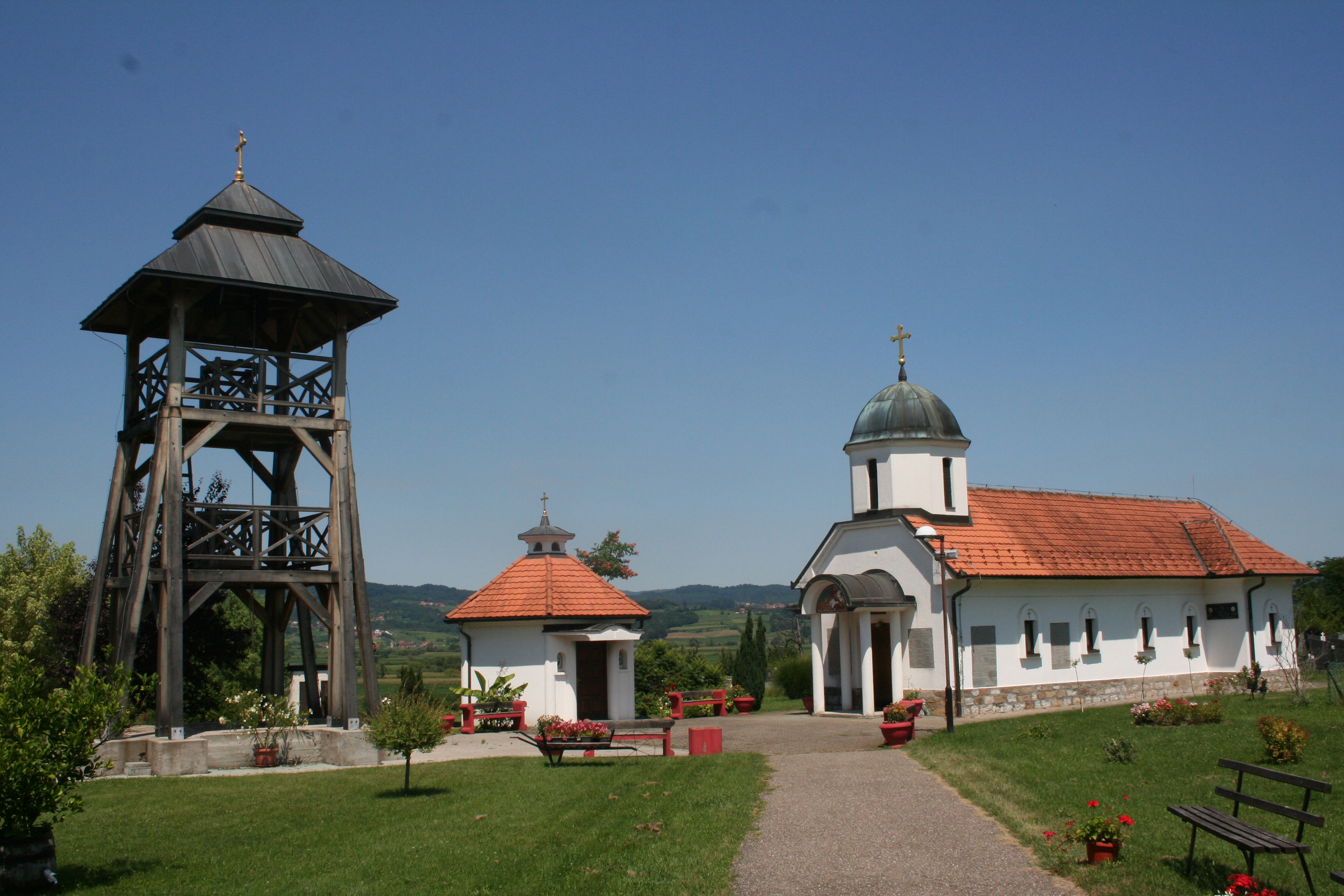

- Location within Serbia
- Coordinates: 44°31′N 19°20′E
- Country: Serbia
- District: Mačva District
- Municipality: Loznica

Population (2011)
  - Total: 717
- Time zone: UTC+1 (CET)
  - Summer (DST): UTC+2 (CEST)

Gornje Nedeljice (Serbian Cyrillic: Горње Недељице) is a village in the municipality of Loznica, Serbia. According to the 2011 census, the village has a population of 717 people.
