= 2018–2020 Serbian protests =

Civil conflict in Serbia

- One of the symbols of the 2018–20 protest depicting hashtag One of Five million
- Date: 30 November 2018 – 16 March 2020 (1 year, 3 months, 1 week and 3 days)
- Location: Serbia: Serbian diaspora
- Caused by: Acts of political violence; Media censorship; Authoritarianism of Aleksandar Vučić; Autocratic government; Government corruption; Particracy and nepotism; Brain Drain; Siniša Mali plagiarism scandal; Arms trafficking; Sexual abuse scandal
- Goals: Resignation of Vučić and several senior state and local officials; Freedom of speech; Freedom of the media; Technical government; Free and fair elections
- Methods: Demonstrations, civil disobedience, civil resistance, riot, occupation of administrative buildings, internet activism
- Result: Opposition signs Agreement with people, starting a boycott of legislative bodies; Presentation of expert negotiating team, publication of recommendations on media and election conditions; The European Parliament-mediated dialogue on election conditions; The University of Belgrade annulled Siniša Mali's PhD title; The major opposition political subjects boycotted the 2020 election

Parties
Anti-government protesters: Civic movement; Student and civilian protesters; Academics and artists; Labour unions; Serbian Opposition: Alliance for Serbia; Movement of Free Citizens; Party of Modern Serbia; New Party; Social Democratic Party; Enough is Enough; New Serbia; Social Democratic Union; Do not let Belgrade d(r)own; Others (sporadic): Communists (primarily members of Marxs21); Liberals; Pro-EU activists; LGBT activists; Feminist activists; Vojvodina autonomists; Sandžak autonomists and separatists	President of Serbia; Government of Serbia: Ministry of Internal Affairs of Serbia; Law enforcement; Government parties and its support: Serbian Progressive Party; Socialist Party of Serbia; Movement of Socialists; People's Peasant Party; United Serbia; Serb List (Kosovo); Non-government political subjects: Serbian Radical Party; Serbian Right

Lead figures
Boško Obradović; Dragan Đilas; Borko Stefanović; Vuk Jeremić; Zoran Lutovac; Branislav Trifunović; Branislav Lečić; Sergej Trifunović	Aleksandar Vučić; Nebojša Stefanović; Ana Brnabić; Siniša Mali; Maja Gojković

Number
Over 100,000 (jointly)	Unknown number of policemen

Casualties and losses
18+ arrested Several injured	Several policeman injured

In late 2018, a series of largely peaceful protests (called Stop Bloody Shirts, Serbian: Стоп крвавим кошуљама, romanized: Stop krvavim košuljama; or One of Five Million, 1 of 5 Million, #1of5million, Serbian: Један од пет милиона, 1 од 5 милиона, #1од5милиона, romanized: Jedan od pet miliona, 1 od 5 miliona, #1od5miliona) over the rise of political violence and against the authoritarian rule of Serbian President Aleksandar Vučić and his governing Serbian Progressive Party (SNS) began to take place in the Serbian capital of Belgrade, soon spreading to cities across the country, as well as in cities with the Serbian diaspora. Demonstrations continued for over a year, becoming the longest-lasting campaign of anti-government demonstrations in Serbia since the Bulldozer Revolution and some of the longest-running in Europe.

The protests were preceded by an assault on an opposition non-parliamentary politician Borko Stefanović in November 2018. The protests were also triggered by many scandals of ruling party members, such as sexual harassment at work, assaults on investigative journalists, a plagiarism scandal, the arrest of whistleblower who uncovered the arms trade that allegedly ended up in the hands of ISIS fighters in Yemen, as well as the smear campaign and the unsolved murder of Kosovo Serb opposition leader Oliver Ivanović.

Parallel to the protests, Vučić launched a campaign "Future of Serbia", organizing rallies in all districts of Serbia, while the pro-government media have constantly demonized protesters and opposition leaders, linking them to fascism as well, spreading misinformation to their readers. Twitter announced that they shut down the network of 8,500 spam accounts that wrote 43 million tweets – acted in concert to cheerlead for president Vučić and his party and attack his opponent, including those involved in the protests.

The non-partisan expert group formulated the demands of the protests, concluded there were no conditions for free and fair elections, and drafted a comprehensive document with demands and recommendations. The protest resulted in inter-party European Parliament-mediated negotiations, but the largest opposition parties announced a boycott of the coming elections due to lack of press freedom and fair electoral conditions. Since February 2020, protests have continued with more significant involvement of opposition parties with key messages to boycott the election.

Protests were suspended in March 2020 over the coronavirus pandemic. Some further and more sporadic gatherings, with heterogeneous demands started in April 2020. Many opposition parties boycotted the elections in June, while less than half the electorate turned out and ruling parties won more than two-thirds of the votes.

Branislav Lečić gives a speech in Belgrade, 20 April 2019

== Background ==
Since the 2000 mass unrests that ended Milošević's rule, major opposition protests had been relatively rare in Serbia. The protests commencing in 2018 have been the third series of such mass demonstrations in three years. The previous series of protests took place in 2017 and were also directed at Vučić and his party, denouncing SNS's perceived domination of the media and voicing concern regarding claims of voter intimidation. The 2016 protests were similarly in part also directed against Vučić.

Vučić became Prime Minister after a snap election was called in 2014. He was a longtime member of the ultra-nationalist Serbian Radical Party, leading to fears that he would "succumb to the temptations of authoritarianism" after his accession to the premiership in 2014. As head of SNS, Vučić however tended to embrace more politically moderate conservative populist and pro-European values, steering government policy toward an eventual entry into the European Union while also maintaining close ties with Russia and China. However, particularly since being elected President in 2017, Vučić had "amassed more power, silenced the press, and undermined opposition", displaying increasingly authoritarian tendencies. Furthermore, Serbia's press freedom rankings decreased sharply during Vučić's rule, with the European parliament admonishing the government to "improve the situation regarding freedom of expression and freedom of the media". Serbia is ranked 90th out of 180 countries in the 2019 Press Freedom Index report compiled by Reporters Without Borders, declining its ranking by fourteen if compared to 2018 and 24 places if compared to 2017. In 2018, International Research & Exchanges Board described the situation in the media in Serbia as the worst in recent history, and that Media Sustainability Index dropped because the most polarized media in almost 20 years, an increase in fake news and editorial pressure on media. Freedom House reported that Serbia's status declined from Free to Partly Free due to deterioration in the conduct of elections, continued attempts by the government and allied media outlets to undermine independent journalists through legal harassment and smear campaigns, and Vučić's accumulation of executive powers that conflict with his constitutional role. Observers have described Vučić's rule as authoritarian or autocratic. Data from the Transparency International showed that a significant increase in perceived corruption was seen exactly from 2012, when Vučić came into power. According to research conducted by the Centre for Investigative Journalism, the battle against corruption in practice comes down to media announcements and arrests in front of cameras.

During 2017, Oliver Ivanović, Kosovo Serb opposition politician, was the target of a smear campaign led by Serb List, Serbian Progressive Party and pro-government Serbian media prior local elections. In July 2017, his car was burned down by unknown perpetrators. On 16 January 2018, Ivanović was shot in a drive-by shooting, while entering his office in North Mitrovica.

The protests were prompted by an assault on Borko Stefanović, one of the leaders of the strongest opposition coalition Alliance for Serbia. Stefanović was attacked by multiple assailants wielding steel rods on 23 November 2018. Stefanović, speaking to a New York Times reporter, said he was struck in the head from behind and knocked unconscious, after which the attackers continued battering him with strikes to the head, leading him to conclude the attack was in fact a failed assassination attempt. A day after the attack, Stefanović displayed his bloodied shirt from the night of the attack at a press conference. The image later became a symbol of the protests, with protesters carrying signs and rallying under the slogan "No More Bloody Shirts" / "Stop the Bloody Shirts". Following the assault, members of the opposition asserted that the attackers (multiple suspects were arrested shortly thereafter but denied any involvement) had ties to the ruling party, or that the assault was a result of hateful and vitriolic rhetoric used by the government against its opponents.

On 8 December, thousands of protesters had rallied in downtown Belgrade to voice concern about the incident while also condemning the government.

On 11 December, the house of investigative journalist Milan Jovanović was shot up and bombarded with Molotov cocktails. The attack on the journalist (who "narrowly escaped") further fueled the protests. Jovanović believes that the attack was related to his reporting on corruption in the municipality.

In Belgrade, the crowds have regularly numbered over 10,000, making them the largest in two decades. Protests have taken place on every consecutive Saturday since the initial rally.

The protests have been organised by various students and activists, along with the Alliance for Serbia, a loose alliance of various opposition parties and organisations. Prominent leaders of the protests have included actor Branislav Trifunović, and Jelena Anasonović, a political science student. Boško Obradović, a hard-right opposition politician, has also emerged as a leading figure of the protests. The political background of protesters and organizers is diverse, with both far-left, liberal, moderate, and far-right nationalist factions voicing opposition to the government. The protests are formally headed by the group Protest Against Dictatorship which also organised similar protests in 2016.

The protests have been non-partisan in nature (despite opposition parties providing some logistical support), but some protesters and supporters have voiced consternation over the inefficacy of the political opposition, expressing concern that without a viable electoral outlet, the momentum of the protests will simply fizzle out. Notably, the magazine Foreign Policy argued that demonstrations against Vucic’s authoritarian government won’t achieve anything until the opposition can present a coherent alternative. This is a similar concern voiced by experts who argue that Vucic's opposition is too fragmented and its leaders too different to work in unison against Vucic. The survey conducted among the protesters showed that about half of the protesters do not support any political party, but to protest against the suppression of media freedom and corruption. The vast majority of protesters (77%) were made by highly educated citizens and students.

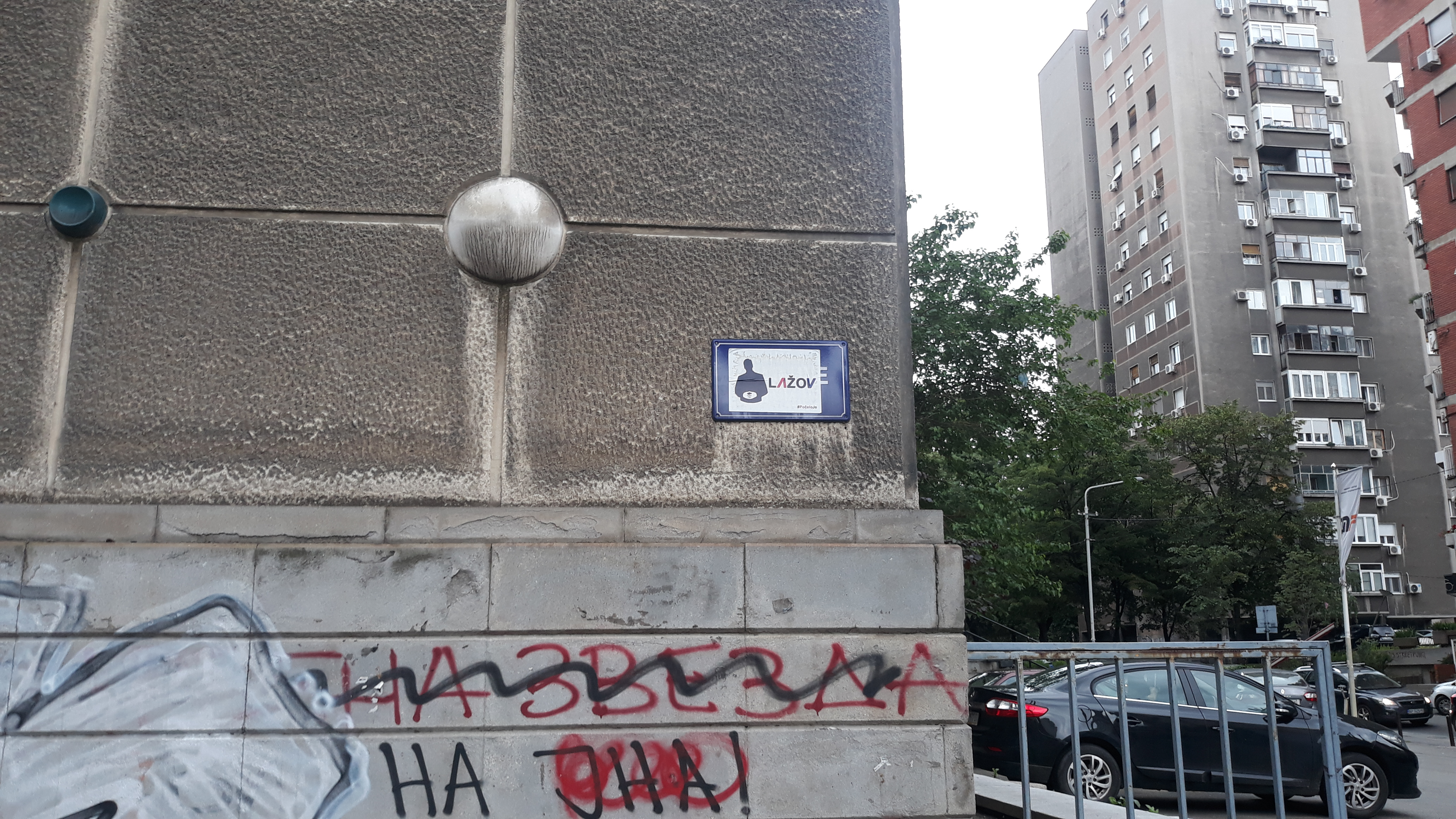
Anti-Vučić graffiti in Belgrade, 24 May 2019

=== Demands ===
The protesters have called for greater press freedom, greater political freedom and plurality, electoral reform, new elections, and more government transparency, and condemned what they perceive as Vučić's increasingly authoritarian tendencies (with manifestations including "hate speech" against opponents, suppression of dissenting voices, and mounting control over the country's media), while also accusing him of creating a climate of fear and violence, and the party he heads of being corrupt. Some protesters and prominent figures also called for Vučić's resignation.

== Timeline ==
=== November–December 2018 ===
- 23 November 2018 – Borko Stefanović, one of the leaders of the strongest opposition coalition Alliance for Serbia, is thrashed by several assailants wielding metal rods.
- 30 November 2018 – the first meeting was announced for Friday, 30 November in Krusevac itself. He began as a regular forum of the Alliance for Serbia with the support of other parties and movements. However, after that, the attendants walked out to the streets and organized a protest walk, which was attended by about a thousand people.
- 8 December 2018 – the initial rally is held in Belgrade.
- 11 December 2018 – the home of an investigative journalist is shot up and attacked with firebombs.
- 20 December 2018 – the protest organisers announced the demands: five minutes for the protests on the Radio Television of Serbia, equal coverage by public broadcasters of all political options, the identification of the killers and masterminds behind the murder of Oliver Ivanović, as well as those behind a murder attempt on Borko Stefanović and journalist Milan Jovanović.

=== January 2019 ===
- 13 January 2019 – rally in Belgrade for the sixth consecutive Saturday, rallies in several other cities.
- 16 January 2019 – protesters stage a candlelit vigil for Kosovan Serb politician assassinated in 2018 whose murder remained unsolved, demanding an inquiry.
- 17 January 2019 – Vučić meets Russian President Vladimir Putin in a lavish reception that critics label a publicity stunt and distraction. Tens of thousands of attendants are bused in, some are reportedly cajoled into attendance by material rewards or coerced by threatening firing.
- January 2019 – the protests have spread from the capital to several other cities, including Novi Sad, Niš, and several smaller towns.
- 25 January 2019 – Vučić announces an arrest of a mayor belonging to his party in connection to the attack on a journalist's home.
- 24–31 January 2019 – more than 1,200 scientists and university professors, as well as more than 400 actors and artists, have signed a proclamation supporting the protests.

=== February 2019 ===
- 6 February 2019 – opposition presents and signs draft of the Agreement with the People. The document outlines plans for profound democratic reform and democratic principles in line with the demands of the protesters to which the opposition pledges to adhere. Opposition also declares intention to begin a boycott of legislative bodies/other assemblies "in which the regime has abolished democratic principles of parliamentarism".
- 6 February 2019 – parallel to the protests, Vučić launched a campaign "Future of Serbia", visiting towns throughout Serbia and championing his policies.
- 11 February 2019 – parts of the parliamentary opposition vow to boycott parliament in an act of solidarity and support with the protesters, with at least 45 of the 250 members of parliament participating.
- 8 February 2019 – professors of the University of Belgrade Faculty of Philosophy have launched a panel discussion each Thursday, where intellectuals discuss different aspects of the crisis Serbian society is in under Vučić, with the aim of joining protests and empowering society.

=== March–May 2019 ===
- 12 March 2019 – special Tuesday protests to mark the 16th anniversary of the assassination of former centrist liberal PM Zoran Đinđić that played an important role in the democratic transition of the country. Close associates of Đinđić welcome and endorse the protests.
- 16 March 2019 – protesters surround the presidential residence and storm the building of the state broadcaster and are confronted by riot police using tear gas to disperse the crowds, several are arrested. After the arrests, protesters gather before the police headquarters, demanding the release of the arrested demonstrators.
- 13 April 2019 – the most massive protest; a plan for a dialogue on media and election rules was presented.
- 20 April 2019 – the announcement of a non-partisan expert negotiation team to talk to the authorities about three key points – throttled media, abuses by the Regulatory Body for Electronic Media and irregular elections.
- 25 May 2019 – the European Commission stated in the Serbia 2019 Report that overall peaceful protests, demanding freedom of the media and free and fair elections, grew over time. They criticised election conditions, which include the lack of transparency of party and campaign financing, the blurred distinction between party and state activities, and the unbalanced media coverage. The Commission expressed a serious concern about freedom of expression and that cases of threats, intimidation and violence against journalists are still a concern.

=== June–August 2019 ===
- June, 2019 – the protests become some of the longest-running in Europe.
- 3 June 2019 – the expert team concluded there were no conditions for free and fair elections in the country, due to the lack of public communication and inequality in that process, and they drafted a comprehensive and systematic document with six demands and six annexes.
- 26 August 2019 – Sergej Trifunović, leader of the Movement of Free Citizens and one of the most prominent figures of protests, wrote an open letter to David McAllister, the Chairman of the Foreign Affairs Committee of the European Parliament, asking him to consider facilitating a cross-party dialogue.

=== September–November 2019 ===
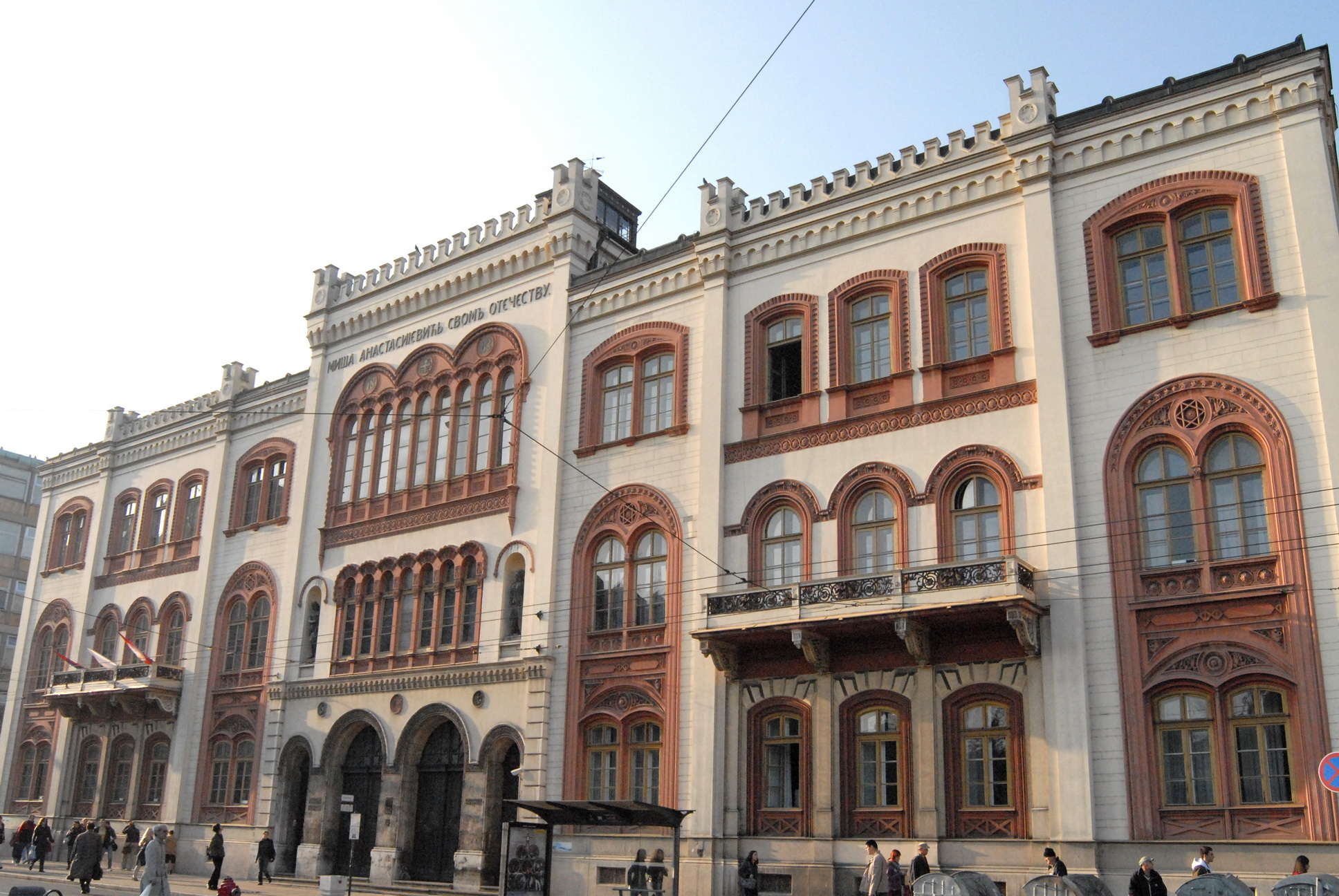
The University of Belgrade's main building was blocked for 12 days by students led by the protest organisers, demanding the final verdict on whether the doctorate of Siniša Mali, the Ministry of Finance, was plagiarised

- 3 September 2019 – the protest organisers called for a boycott of the coming parliamentary election because no recommendation of the expert team was adopted.
- 16 September 2019 – parties of the Alliance for Serbia, the major opposition group, had taken a joint decision to boycott the next elections.
- 13–25,= September 2019 – students' blockade of the University of Belgrade's main building led by the protest organizers, demanding the final verdict by the University Ethics Committee whetherthe doctorate of Siniša Mali, Ministry of Finance was a plagiarism.
- 9–10 October 2019 – the first round of inter-party European Parliament-mediated dialogue in Serbia took place, while the Alliance for Serbia refused to participate, stating that there is no time for their demands for fair election conditions to be met before April, when the election is scheduled.
- 19 October 2019 – a protest was held over the arrest of whistleblower who uncovered the arms trade that ended up in the hands of ISIS fighters in Yemen, in which the father of Nebojša Stefanović, Internal Affairs and Deputy Prime Minister, was involved.
- 15 November 2019 – the second round of inter-party European Parliament-mediated dialogue will once again be boycotted by the Alliance for Serbia. It was concluded that progress had been made in some areas, such as the work of the electoral committees, the registry of voters and the misuse of public resources, the two most important problems of the electoral process – media reporting and pressure on voters – remain untouched.
- 21 November 2019 – the Council of Europe alerted that the whistleblower Aleksandar Obradović is under house arrest.
- 21 November 2019 – the University of Belgrade Ethics Committee decided to annul Siniša Mali's PhD title, the opposition called for the resignation of the Ministry of Finance.

=== December 2019 ===
- 12–13 December 2019 – at the third round of EP-mediated dialogue, it was concluded that continued observation of implementation was necessary and it was agreed to move the election as late as possible. The EP delegation members announced that conditions for fair and free elections in Serbia have not yet been established.
- 18 December 2019 – the Krušik whistleblower Aleksandar Obradović was released from house arrest.

=== January 2020 ===
- 12 January 2020 – authorities said they would reduce the electoral threshold from 5% to 3%. The move has been criticised by numerous observers, opposition parties, the EP delegation members and the Transparency Serbia, stating that this will help some smaller parties enter parliament after the announced boycott of the largest opposition parties.
- 17 January 2020 – Ljubiša Preletačević, third in the 2017 presidential election, declared a boycott the next parliamentary elections.
- 28 January 2020 – the One of Five million organisation said they would take part in the next elections after advocating boycott for over a year. Some members in the capital and elsewhere disassociated themselves from the decision and criticised those who changed their mind.
- 1 February 2020 – the leaders of opposition formally marked the beginning of their campaign for the boycott, while also joined the protests.

=== March 2020 ===
- 10 March 2020 – protests have been suspended over the coronavirus pandemic, until the epidemiological situation was remedied.

=== Later gatherings ===
Although there have been some sporadic gatherings since then, regular Saturday protests have not been re-established, even though the state of emergency was abolished in early May.

- 11 May 2020 – A protest took place outside the parliament building in Belgrade.
- 21 June 2020 – The parliamentary elections were boycotted by the Alliance for Serbia, Social Democratic Party, Together for Serbia, Civic Platform, as well some extra-parliamentary parties and movements, such as Social Democratic Union and Do not let Belgrade d(r)own-led Civic Front alliance, and some individual politicians, such as Đorđe Vukadinović. Less than half the electorate turned out, which was the lowest percentage since the establishment of a multi-party system in 1990, and ruling parties won more than two-thirds of the votes.

=== July 2020 ===
- 7 July 2020 – Mass protests took off again in front of the Serbian parliament building in Belgrade, hours after the Serbian government announced that curfews to curb the spread of COVID-19 would be reinstated. The police force used teargas in an attempt to disperse the crowd.

=== August 2020 ===
- 8 August 2020 – Global protests were organized in 13 different cities across Europe and the United States. The protestors demanded the following:
  1. Repeating the 2020 parliamentary elections and for the Constitutional Court to rule them void as per numerous documented electoral frauds.
  2. Releasing all peaceful protestors who were falsely accused and imprisoned under political influence in the COVID-19 protests and riots in Serbia.
  3. Resignation of the COVID Crisis Team and forming an independent commission to assess the amount of political influence in making COVID-decisions.

They've also supported the "United Against Covid" petition of over 2,900 Serbian doctors who demanded the resignation of the COVID Crisis Team for their incompetence and allowing themselves to make decisions based on political influence from the ruling party.

== Government response ==
Responding to the protests, Vučić said that he would not compromise with the protesters "even if there were 5 million people in the street" (prompting protesters to adopt the slogan "One of Five Million" ("#1od5miliona")) but saying he would be willing to call a snap election. Both Vučić and his Serbian Progressive Party maintain popularity of over 50% in spite of the protests, and opposition leaders have responded to Vučić's suggestions of an early election by committing to a boycott due to what they describe as "unfair conditions. One of the political opposition leaders justified the boycott plans by saying that no election can be considered legitimate until "normal conditions for elections and living are created". Instead, many of them have called for the institution of a technocratic transitional government which would serve for a period of 1 year after which elections would be held.

In an interview in late December, Vučić declared he was ready to discuss the protesters' demands, saying "I am ready to look at what causes dissent of the people".

In late January, Vučić announced the arrest a mayor (and a member of Vučić's SNS party) in connection to the attack on the journalist's home, saying "A party membership card will not save anyone from responsibility. Journalists will be protected no matter for whom they work for [sic] ... No one will be protected because of being a politician" while also promising a fiercer fight against political violence and cronyism, including legislative actions.

After several months of protests, President Vučić and the ruling party members have labelled protesters "fascists, hooligans and thieves" and accuse them of violence. Goran Vesić, Belgrade’s Deputy Mayor, linked the protests to the "celebration of the day that Adolf Hitler invaded Belgrade", as well as alleged support by Ramush Haradinaj, Prime Minister of Kosovo whom Serbia charges of war crimes, with the ultimate goal of overthrowing Aleksandar Vučić.

=== Putin visit ===
On 17 January 2019, President Vučić received visiting Russian President Vladimir Putin in a "lavish welcome" and a showing of friendship and mutual support. Tens of thousands of attendants were bused to Belgrade from across Serbia for an event that critics labelled a "popularity stunt" and a purposeful distraction from the protests. Many of those in the cheering crowd of 100,000 were said to have been "offered incentives to attend, including five liters of milk", while others were said to have been threatened with firing by bosses should they choose not to attend, according to media reports. It was also speculated that the reception was an attempt by Vučić to placate and shore up support of conservative pro-Russian sections of the population who are concerned about the pro-European tendencies of the President and his government.

The ceremony was staged at the same location where, just a day prior, tens of thousands of protesters marched for a candlelight vigil to honour the death of Oliver Ivanović, a moderate Serb politician that was assassinated in broad daylight in Kosovo in 2018. The vigil was organised by the same groups that were spearheading the ongoing anti-Vučić protests; the unsolved murder had become a "rallying point" for the protesters, signifying the repressive and sometimes violent political atmosphere of the region.

== See also ==
- 2017 Serbian protests
- 2017–2018 Russian protests
- 2019 Montenegrin anti-corruption protests
- 2019-2020 clerical protests in Montenegro
- 2020–2022 Serbian protests
- 2020 Serbian parliamentary election
- 2024 Serbian environmental protests
- COVID-19 protests and riots in Serbia
