= Siniša Mali plagiarism scandal =

Political scandal in Serbia

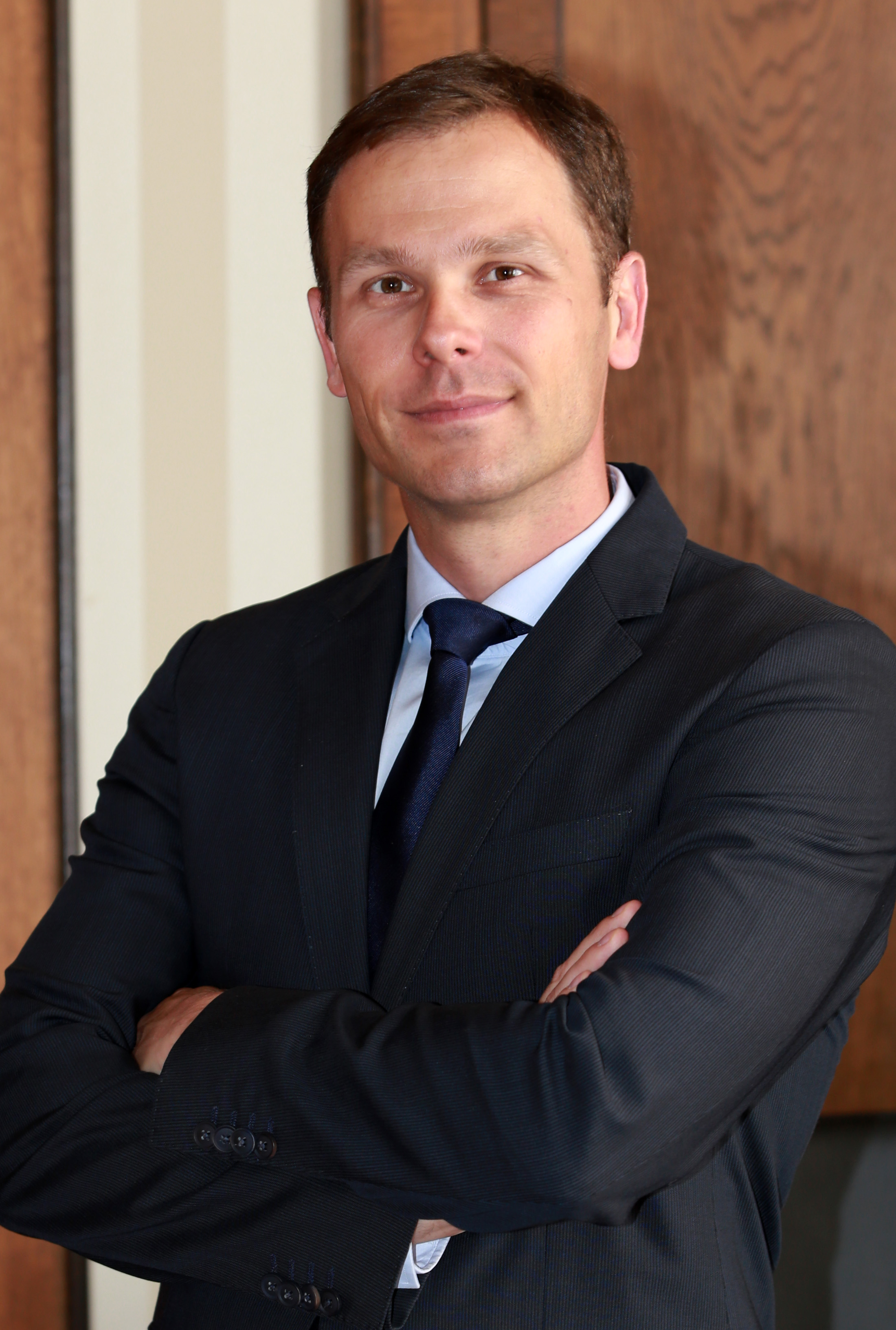
Siniša Mali

The Siniša Mali plagiarism scandal was a political scandal in Serbia which led to the University of Belgrade annulling the 2013 dissertation of economist and politician Siniša Mali in 2019. The process of establishing the initial claims took over five years, during which Mali progressed from the mayoralty of Belgrade to becoming the finance minister in the Serbian government, joining the ruling Serbian Progressive Party (SNS). After this scandal, Mali enrolled in doctoral studies at the Technical University of Košice, where he studied finance. In June 2023, he defended his PhD thesis whose objective was to study the existence and characteristics of the flypaper effect in Serbia.

The question of Mali's annulled dissertation grew from an academic matter to a political affair due to the negligence of the state and academic institutions, leading to which in turn public protests, a student blockade of the university and a serious partisan divide among the public.

Because of his personal connections with Aleksandar Vučić, his brother Andrej Vučić and Ana Brnabić, Mali was defended by the government and his party in what was described as an operation to "defend and protect plagiarism" with the whole "[political] machinery employed to defend the doctorate". The controversy triggered protests and public performances calling for the doctorate to be annulled, which ultimately blended into the wider civil and political Serbian protests since 2018. This was enhanced by the perception of his mayoralty of Belgrade, which was described as the "affair of all affairs". while Mali himself was labeled "controversial" and "scandal-ridden".

Due to the scandal, Mali was never officially awarded a doctorate, but government media still referred to him as holding it and he wrote his occupation as "Doctor of Philosophy" in the 2018 electoral list in Belgrade. On 12 December 2019, the Senate of the Belgrade University unanimously annulled his doctorate due to plagiarism. Ten days later, Mali removed his degree information from his biography on the Ministry of Finance website, but he refused to step down and called the annulment a political decision.

The case has been unfavorably compared to the Guttenberg plagiarism scandal, particularly given that Mali's case took 6 years to be resolved. The faculty and university were labeled "shameful" and the whole process was called a "mawkish saga" ultimately resolved due to the persistence of students and professors alike. The academia's fear of confronting politicians, government pressure on FON and the obedience and corruption of the country's intellectuals were blamed for the case.

The doctorate of Mali was one in a series of Serbian education-related scandals since 2014 regarding dubious academic qualifications, mostly those held by politician. Mali's doctorate was the first to be annulled by the university itself On 11 March 2015, the European Parliament expressed concerns that neither academia nor political institutions were properly dealing with plagiarism. In 2018, the National Entity for Accreditation and Quality Assurance in Higher Education of Serbia (NAT) was reduced to an associate member of the European Association for Quality Assurance in Higher Education.

The scandal was noted as occurring alongside an exponential swell in the number of awarded doctorates in Serbia. In a 100 year span from 1905 (the beginning of awarded doctorates in Serbia) to 2005, 16,860 doctorates were awarded. In the next 8 years, from 2006 to 2013, there were 9,000, with an added 15,000 doctoral students. The number of students per capita in Serbia is below the European average, but it was noted that the number of doctoral students is well above the average, with one mentor having up to 15 students. In a 2014 survey, 65% of the faculties reported having no plagiarism procedure and only some of the remaining 35% could eplain their existing procedure.

== Doctorate ==
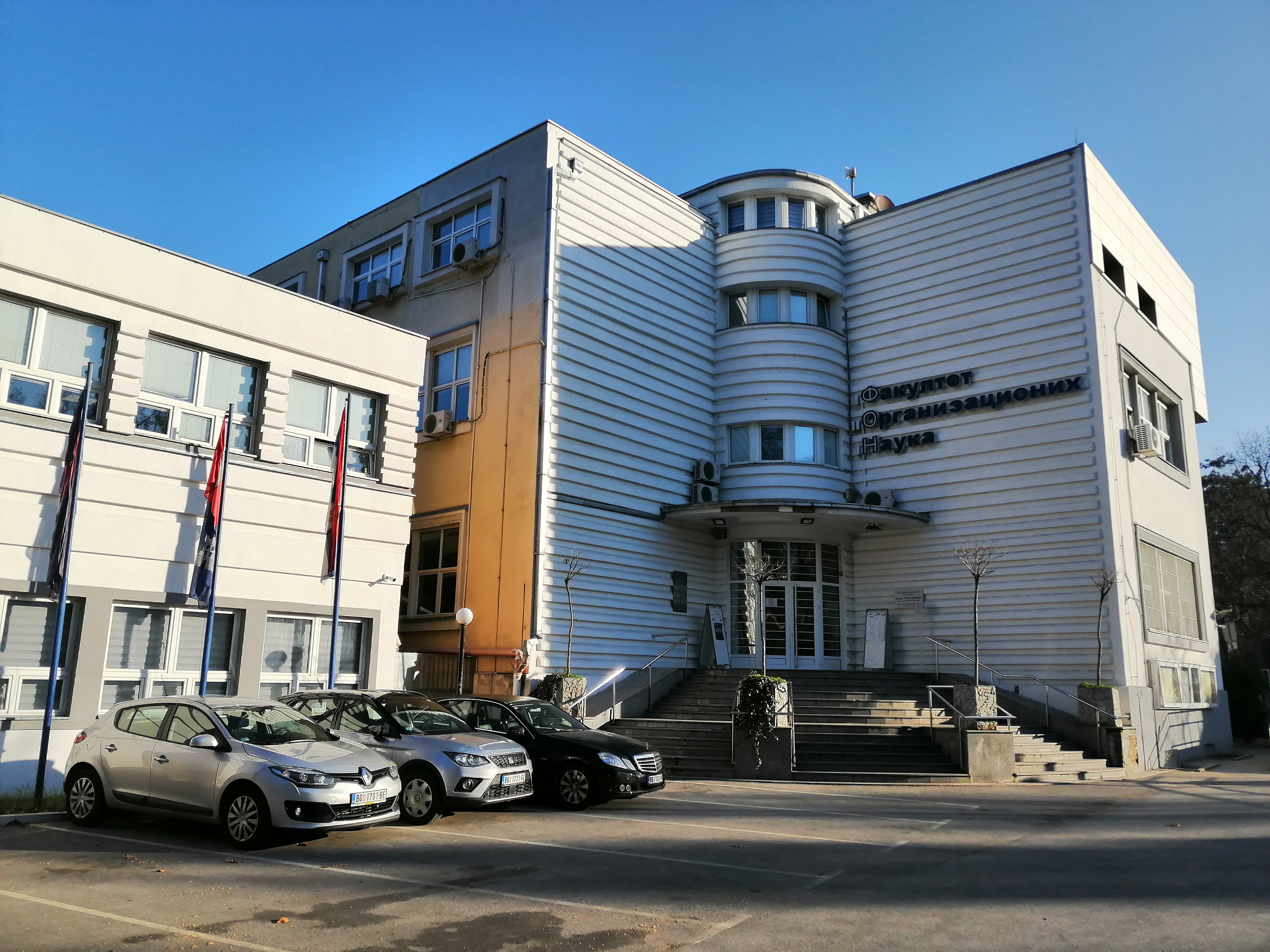
Faculty of Organizational Sciences, where Siniša Mali defended his doctoral thesis in 2013

Mentored by professor Dragan Đuričin, Siniša Mali in 2002 originally submitted his thesis at the faculty where he studied, the Faculty of Economics (EKOF). The title of the thesis was Privatization by the Method of Enterprises Selling - Theoretical Concepts and the Case of Serbia. After 9 years, the report on the work wasn't adopted by the EKOF in 2011, and Mali's public defense of the dissertation was refused. The faculty rejected his submission, concluding the work is of low quality and without scientific value.

Mali then modified it and submitted it to the University of Belgrade's Faculty of Organizational Sciences (FON) under the title Value Creation through the Process of Restructuring and Privatisation – Theoretical Concepts and the Case of Serbia. There he obtained his PhD in 2013. The commission included professors Ondrej Jaško (new mentor), Slađana Barjaktarović Rakočević and Đuričin.

Switching of the faculties later became part of the controversy. Professor Đuričin, one of the members of the commission which accepted Mali's thesis at the FON, actually claimed that Mali wrote two doctorates, the one rejected at the FE, and one accepted by the FON. Submitting one the same thesis at two faculties is forbidden and the Faculty of Economics never published Mali's original thesis nor the reasons why it was rejected, so it remains unclear if these were different theses. Mali stated that he wrote the thesis for 3 years, which would mean that he concurrently wrote two theses. Dean of the FON at the time of Mali's defense of the thesis, professor Milan Martić, confirmed that Mali's doctoral dissertation was rejected at the FE, after which he has published his dissertation at the FON. He also stated that 50% of the dissertation was different from the first one, but the original dissertation remained unpublished.

== Initial plagiarism reports ==
On 9 July 2014 the website "Peščanik" claimed that Mali had plagiarized at least one third of his PhD thesis. Raša Karapandža, finance professor at the EBS University of Business and Law in Wiesbaden, Germany, and visiting scholar at the New York University and the University of California, Berkeley, showed that Mali plagiarized the thesis with the content from other theses, authored articles, site of the Agency of Privatization of Serbia and Wikipedia by publishing several examples. Karapandža claimed at the time that Mali plagiarized at least 33% of the thesis, publishing data which confirmed some 18%. At that time, Mali said he "is firmly standing behind his work".

In September 2014, German publisher De Gruyter announced that the article published in their journal, one of two which qualified Mali for the title, contains uncited paragraphs from the doctoral dissertation of Stifanos Hailemariam, a professor and economist from Eritrea, titled Corporate Value Creation, Governance and Privatisation: Restructuring and Managing Enterprises in Transition – The Case of Eritrea, defended at the University of Groningen in The Netherlands, in 2001. On 20 January 2015, Simon Cifert, editor-in-chief of the journal "Organization and Management" which published the scientific work of Siniša Mali, retracted Mali's text from the journal. After revision of the text submitted by the lead co-author, the editorial board of the journal republished the above-mentioned study, with an introductory note Corrigendum, citing another source from the literature used in the design of the study, which was claimed by the co-author to be a technical mistake in the previous version. 13 citations of Hailemariam were added, unlike the previous work which had no quotes by him at all.

A group of the FON alumni sent an open letter to dean Martić, claiming a blatant conflict of interest. One of the co-authors of the retracted article was Slađana Barjaktarović Rakočević. The article later became part of the thesis, while she became a member of the commission when Mali defended it. Additionally, the other article which quialified Mali to submit his thesis, Privatization Through the Sale of Equity – Conceptual Framework and Archived Results in Serbia, was published in February 2013 in magazine Ekonomika preduzeća, whose editor is Dragan Đuričin, Mali's original mentor and another defending commission member.

Group of authors, joined by the association "Save the science" ("Spasimo nauku") pointed out that even if two published works were non-plagiarized and legitimate, they wouldn't be acceptable for the doctorate defense. Code on Accreditation of the Study Programs stipulates that, in order to be accepted for the doctoral theses, work must be published in magazines listed at SCIndeks, Serbian version of citation analysis. Neither of Mali's articles was published in such magazines.

== First faculty commission ==
"Plagiarism is representation of someone else's ideas or works, entirely or partially, without naming the original authorship or sources, that is, illegal claiming of others intellectual works and scientific results and their representation as your own, so as literal taking of other author's text, that is, copying from electronic and printed sources, from Serbian or foreign language, partially or entirely, without naming author's name and source from which the text was taken, so as without strict marking of the taken part." Professional Code of Ethics, University of Belgrade, section of Article 22

Prompted by Karapandža's report, the FON formed a commission to investigate Mali's doctorate. All three members of the commission were the same as the original thesis defending commission (Jaško, Barjaktarović Rakočević, Đuričin). In October 2014, this commission gave positive opinion on the thesis. They claimed that the process neither stipulated, nor it was possible, to use specialized software for discovering plagiarism and that media reports regarding the issue are not credible. The commission did state that certain parts regarding the literature listing were incorporated without quoting, which doesn't affect the doctorate's scientific contribution. In media, the findings of the commission were simply titled the Mentor's Report. The Scientific-Teaching Council (NNV) of the faculty accepted this report on 20 November 2014. Out of 154 members (NNV is made of professors and assistants), 118 were present: 117 yes, 1 abstained.

On 10 December 2014, the Legal-Economic Sciences Council of the Belgrade University rejected this report, as out of 23 members, 11 voted to accept it. Some, including the "Save the Science" movement, took this as the official recognition of the plagiarism, calling for the university to annul Mali's doctorate immediately.

Rector of the Belgrade University, Vladimir Bumbaširević, on 10 June 2015 asked the Legal-Economic Sciences Council to re-examine the case after the retracted article by De Gruyter was reposted with added references. The council refused to do so, waiting for the university's new code regarding the plagiarism process and ethical codes. Though announced for the end of 2015, they were adopted only in July 2016. The process was then returned to the FON, to start the new procedure.

== Second faculty commission ==
In November 2016 the FON formed new Ethics Commission which included Milica Bulajić, Mladen Čudanov, Srđa Bjeladinović, Veroljub Nastić and Miloš Krstanović. On 19 December 2016 the commission rejected plagiarism report as unsubstantiated, concluded that citing omissions are negligible, that software checks can't be the basis for the proceedings and that it can not be challenged on the original scientific contribution of the doctoral dissertation as the scientific contribution is undisputable.

Professor Karapandža called the report meaningless, as the commission didn't try to dispute the plagiarism regarding the translation from English to Serbian, as checking software can't do that so it has to be done "by hand". He also said that, given the amount of copied/translated text, it can't be just citing omission. Dušan Teodorović, a member of the Serbian Academy of Science and Arts and president of the Academy Board for Higher Education sent 20 pages of evidence which he alleged prove the work is a plagiarism to the rector of the university asking for Mali's PhD to be annulled. On 18 January 2017, citing procedural reasons, the Senate of the University of Belgrade rejected the Ethics Commission findings, instructing the faculty to form an Experts Commission instead, as it should have done in the first place by the university's rule book.

== Third faculty commission ==
=== Failure in forming a commission ===
By April 2017, all members of the commission resigned, with the exception of professor Čudanov who was teaching at the chair headed by professor Jaško, Mali's mentor. The FON failed to assemble the next commission for 3 years. The faculty asked for help from the university's Rector Collegium, admitting that 4 of their professor refused to participate in the commission, which was to have 4 members: two appointed by the faculty, one by the university's council in charge of the subject (alter confirmed as the Council of the Social-Humanist Sciences), and one by the National Council for Higher Education. It was reported that the collegium managed to provide one member (originally only reported to be from Slovenia) and that National Council delegated professor Milan Jovanović who was neither present at the voting, nor accepted it.

In October 2017, the National Council announced Italian professor Roberto Velardi as their member of the commission. Just two months later, Velardi withdrew citing health reasons. The Council of the Social-Humanist Sciences had no candidates as no one wanted to accept the appointment, even from the Faculty of Economics, as the member had to be an economic manager. Dean of the faculty Branislav Boričić said they even tried to find someone from other economic institutions, but no one wanted to accept it. He also added that his faculty "already tackled the problem and stated its mind in some way", alluding to the original refusal of Mali's thesis.

During this vacuum, on 27 February 2018 a group of professors and doctors of philosophy delivered a request to the Belgrade University's Rectorate to prevent the promotion of Mali as the doctor of philosophy and to annul his PhD altogether. 379 doctors of philosophy, including 8 members of the Serbian Academy of Sciences and Arts signed a request, which also asks for the ethical scrutiny of three members of the commission which originally confirmed his doctorate. On the same day, economist and professor Boško Mijatović, accused Mali of blatantly copying study Novi model privatizacije u Srbiji (New model of privatization in Serbia), published in 2000 by Mijatović, Boris Begović and Boško Živković. The study is available online and comparison showed that some sections were rewritten to the letter. A day later, rector Bumbaširević announced that the National Council for Higher Education will soon name its representative to the commission, adding that Mali is not a doctor of philosophy, since he hasn't been awarded the doctoral diploma yet, nor has he been promoted to PhD, neither he will be until the entire process is over. Still, on the Serbian Progressive Party's list for the local elections in Belgrade, set for 4 March 2018, Siniša Mali named "doctor of philosophy" as his "occupation".

=== New commission ===
In February 2019, the FON formed an experts commission made of professors Dejan Erić (Belgrade Banking Academy-Union University, Belgrade), Tomaž Čater (School of Economics and Business-University of Ljubljana, Slovenia), Dragan Mikerević (Faculty of Economics-University of Banja Luka, Bosnia and Herzegovina) and Vinko Kandžija (Faculty of Economics-University of Rijeka, Croatia). With the help of the specialized software Turnitin, on 26 March 2019 they concluded that Mali properly quoted only 2 out of 126 quotations in his thesis, that he copied 4,500 words without quotations, but that he plagiarized only 6.97% of his thesis, which the commission claimed is not enough to dispute its scientific contribution. The commission found that actually 16% of the text is copied, but the difference came from the "official state reports", "common phrases", "formulas", etc. Mali copied texts from publications of the Agency for Privatization, which he headed at the time. Agency also claimed that some portions were erroneously recognized as plagiarism by the software. The commission also stated that Hailemariam's thesis was the "starting point" for Mali's thesis, even though Mali doesn't quote or mention Hailemariam in his PhD at all. Commission also ignored the accusations of plagiarism by Mijatović, Begović and Živković.

The Experts Commission handed its decision to faculty's Ethics Commission. Made of Čudanov, Nevenka Žarkić Joksimović (president), Milica Jovanović, Snježana Jerković and Mihailo Okiljević. the commission unanimously accepted the report on 2 April. On 8 May, the FON's NNV accepted the Ethics Commission report (110 members present, 82 yes, 28 abstained). The FON sent its report to the Senate of the Belgrade University, which decided to declare itself after the complaint deadline is over, and after the decision of the university's Professional Ethics Board.

== Reactions and escalation ==
=== Academia reaction ===
Despite the claim that 6.97% of plagiarism is not enough to annul the doctorate, ethical code of the Belgrade University states that plagiarism is "literal transcription of the other author's text, or copying from the electronic or printed sources, either in Serbian or foreign languages, in parts or entirety". Commission's bargaining regarding the percentage of plagiarism was described as the insipid, rude argumentation. Other professors protested, claiming that you can't "plagiarize a little", that, depending on the context, you can properly cite other authors but not the entire passages and pages, and that what the Experts Commission described is a textbook of "hidden plagiarism". In general, the commission was accused of polemicizing with Karapandža's evidence instead of dealing with the thesis itself. The composition of the 4-members commission was also criticized. None of the members deal with the corporate finances, which is the theme of the PhD. One of them speaks no English so he couldn't compare the Hailemariam's doctorate to the Mali's one, only one published works in a journal with impact factor, while the third was removed from the state university after he was caught by the police for selling exams to the students. Also, the commission in its report referred to Mali as "doctor", which he still isn't as the university hadn't promoted him yet.

Karapandža pointed out again that Turnitin can't compare theses in two different languages and Mali literally translated it from English to Serbian word by word (with some extremely poor translations), using italics and bolded text in the exactly same places and copying almost all of the schematics and diagrams. The only thing Mali did was to replace Eritrea with Serbia in sentences. He used the same font, too. Mali even kept the example of value forming for cotton, which is one of the main crops in Eritrea but doesn't grow in Serbia. Teodorović also said there is a zero probability that two persons, from different parts of the world, name 100 exactly the same references, in the exactly the same order, including exactly the same typos. Karapandža then showed that the commission actually only cited several pages which he originally published proving it was a plagiarism. He then published further 10 pages of blatant copies by Mali from Hailemariam's original thesis, which the commission never mentioned, asking the commission to tell what is the percentage of plagiarism needed to dispute Mali's PhD and also published 6 plagiarized illustrations. Karapandža also noted that the fact that Mali simply copied texts from the government documents was taken as a mitigating circumstance, while in Germany, in the case of Guttenberg plagiarism scandal it was taken as an aggravated circumstance because of the misuse of state and government resources.

Other complaints included material errors and some "absurdities". For the parts which Karapandža proved that Mali simply translated, the commission commended him for better referencing than Hailemariam himself. But, for example, an author with two surnames at Hailemariam was referenced as two separate authors by Mali. Professor Božidar Radenković, the only FON professor who signed the complaint said that the thesis is plagued with obvious plagiarism and that reports by the FON's Experts and Ethics Commission fall under the comedy genre.

=== Complaints and university reaction ===
Total of 4 complaints were filed to the university's Professional Ethics Board against the findings of the FON's commission. One, upheld by Todorović and Vesna Rakić-Vodinelić, was signed by 140 university professors. Second complaint was filed by 3 professors from the University of Belgrade Faculty of Law (Miodrag Jovanović, Goran Dajović, Bojan Spaić) who challenged the report on percentage of allegedly allowed plagiarism and commission's erroneous effort to comment and examine scientific contribution instead of checking if it is an original piece of work. The third and fourth complaints were filed by professors Predrag Simonović (Faculty of Biology) and Aleksej Tarasjev ("Siniša Stanković" Institute for Biology Research), respectively.

After the complaint period expired on 24 May, rector Ivanka Popović forwarded the complaints to the Professional Ethics Board. Acting upon the complaints, on 15 July the board again returned the doctorate back to the FON for new deliberation, giving them 60 days to do so. They concluded that the commission's findings, on which the faculty's decision was made, were "incomplete, unclear and contradictory". When published, board's report stated that faculty's commission didn't check if the doctorate is plagiarized at all, judging the “scientific contribution” instead, which wasn't its task. The board also asked for feedback from both the faculty and Mali, regarding new complaints. The faculty responded to the board, Mali didn't. They also instructed the commission that software check is only one of the ways to check for plagiarism. Some professors criticized the board for not declaring a plagiarism right away, while others resigned their administrative posts in protest (Slobodan Prvanović, Ognjen Radović). Prvanović, deputy member of the board, resigned the post and accused the board of preparing the decision for returning the report months ago, in order to accommodate the ruling establishment in the state, to which Mali belonged. He asked the Senate to dismiss the board for being compromised, but that didn't happen. He also reported pressure he experienced from hiss director, head of the Physics Institute, Aleksandar Bogojević.

Rector Popović asked for the professors not to pressure the board. Critics responded that the board was left alone for months and again made a bad decision, while the "post festum" criticism is not a pressure.

=== Blockade of the Rectorate ===
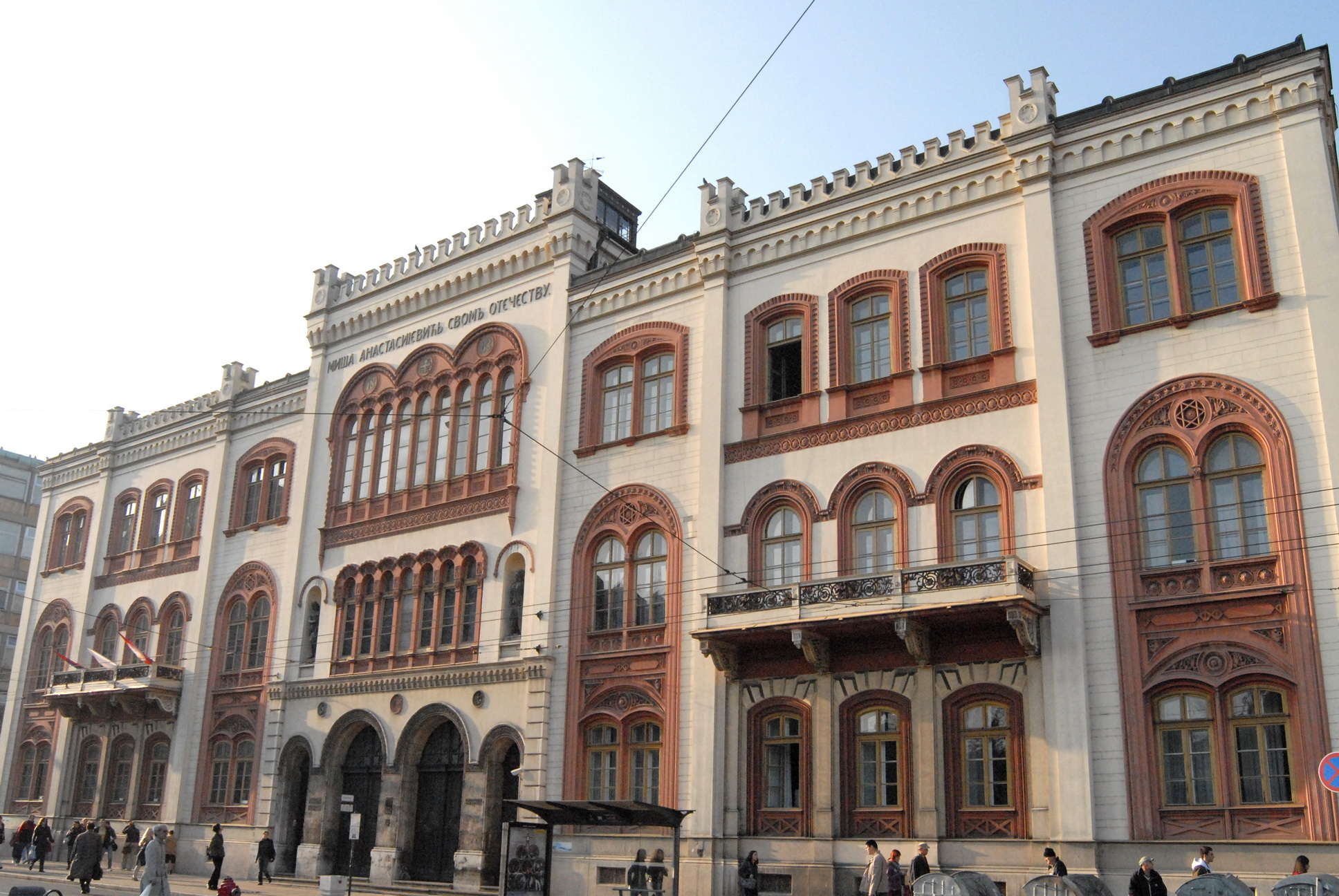
Building of the Rectorate of University of Belgrade was blocked by the students in September 2019 because Mali's doctorate wasn't annulled after 5 years despite all the evidence

A group of students blocked the Rectorate of University of Belgrade on 19 July 2019, protesting the Senate's decision. During talks with the rector Popović, they asked for the university to push the prime minister Ana Brnabić to dismiss Mali from the government (and Interior Minister Nebojša Stefanović, also because of the plagiarism), in order to ease the pressure on the university to declare the doctorate a plagiarism. Popović asked for some time over the summer to see into the students' demands, so the students set a deadline for September, when they promised to continue their actions.

On 13 September 2019, a group of students from the association "1 of 5 Million" locked themselves inside the Rectorate, blocking anyone from entering. Their main demand was that rector Popović, on Radio Television Serbia, calls for premier Brnabić to sack Mali from the government citing conflict of interest since Mali, as a finance minister, assigns funds to the university's budget. Counter group, some of which admitted they were summoned by the ruling Serbian Progressive Party (SNS) also gathered, clashing with the students. Others were identified as party activists via social networks. Groups of citizens who supported the students gathered in front of the building, including some professors and public and opposition figures. University's governing bodies accused the students of non-academic behavior and political demands.

Popović, however, began negotiations with the students stating that hostile takeover of the building, cutting off of water or electricity or any repressive measures towards the students are out of the question. Negotiations came to the stalemate until 22 September, when Popović acknowledged and condemned intrusion of the SNS activists into the building, which was one of the demands from the protesters, confirming that some members of the SNS group were obviously "not students". Negotiations continued, with Popović defending protesters adding the talks are the only course of action and that question of Mali's doctorate must "be solved". The agreement was reached when Popović announced she "stands by her students" who are "fighting for the autonomy and reputation of the university". As per compromise with the students, she gave a deadline to the Ethics Board until 4 November to decide whether Mali's doctorate is a case of plagiarism. On 25 September, students left the building. The rector guaranteed their request regarding Mali's doctorate will be executed. Popović also stated that the students who participated in the blockade must not bare any disciplinary or any other academic consequences. The students reiterated they organized the blockade because of Mali's plagiarism, and announced a new blockade, this time jointly with the professors who support them, if Mali's doctorate is not confirmed as plagiarism.

=== Governmental response ===
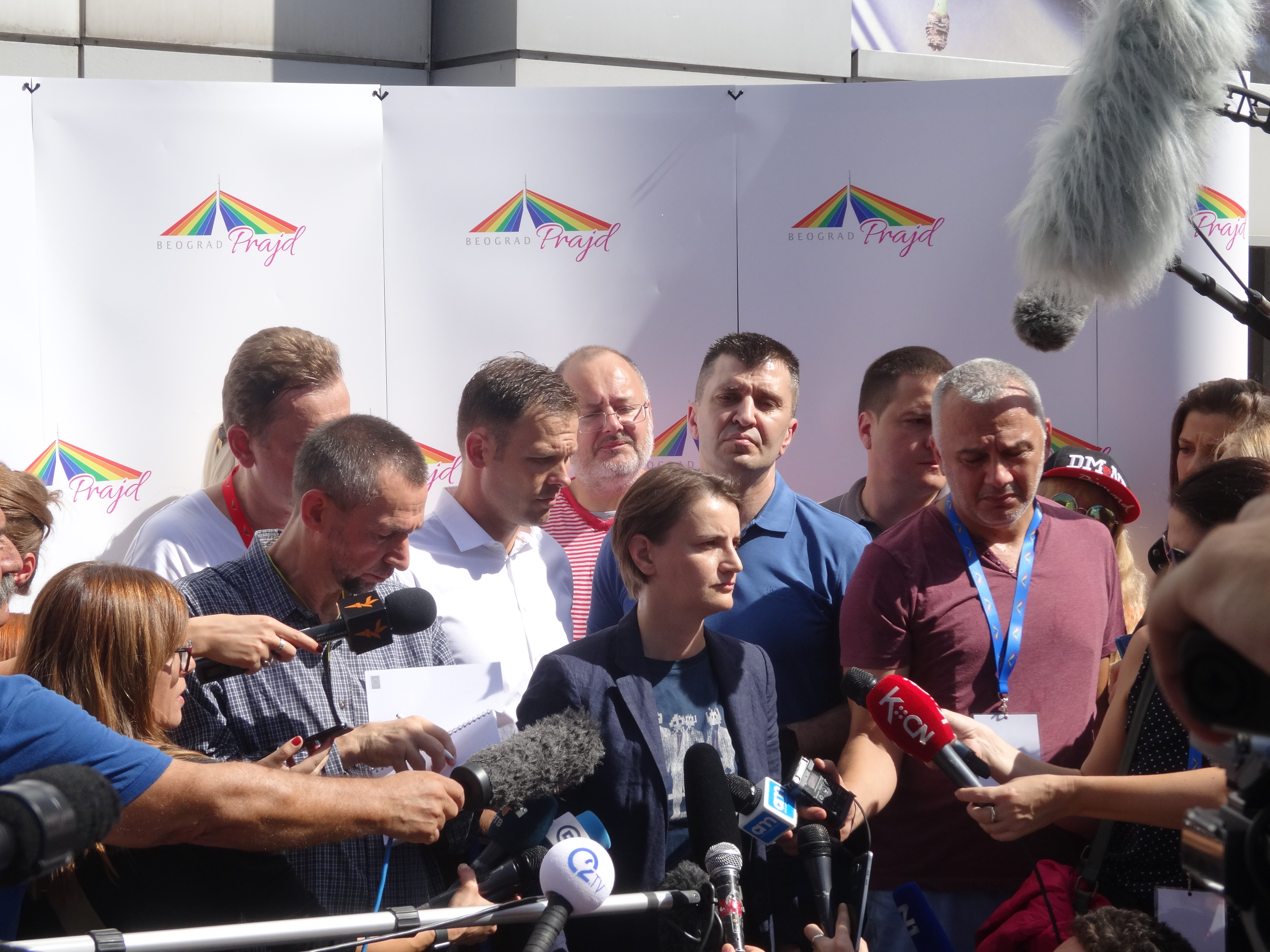
Prime minister Ana Brnabić and then Belgrade mayor Mali, in 2017. In 2018 Mali entered her government as the Minister of Finance. Brnabić, his high school friend, staunchly defended Mali, refusing to sack him from the government even after the plagiarism was confirmed

Regarding the complaints and number of professor who signed them, Siniša Mali said that collecting signatures doesn't bother him and that he believes in his knowledge and institution of university. He stayed quiet regarding the protests, but posted his diplomas and recognitions, and photos of him "still studying", on his Instagram account, though no one disputed his diplomas, only the doctorate.

Prime minister Ana Brnabić made a statement, expressing her support to Mali regarding the students' request during their blockade of the rectorate. She stated that Mali was her personal choice for a minister and that she was completely confident in her decision. She also said that without Mali there would be no reduction in payroll taxes, an increase of the minimum wage and other good things that happened. Brnabić expressed her concern that the whole process was politically motivated. She said she did not want to interfere with the autonomy of the university, but as a citizen she noticed the contradictory statements of rector Popović. President Aleksandar Vučić supported Mali and stated that the protest for his dismissal was organized by the students who want to influence the composition of the government. He added that Mali's appointment as a minister was the political decision of the ruling coalition. He also stated that the goal of the blockade itself is to elicit attention and not to improve student conditions. In order to explain how the actions of the students make no sense, Vučić said:

My daughter Milica, you know, she now has 17 years, she speaks Russian and English perfectly, German better and better, so, now, go my son, go my daughter back to the nursery school and then protest because quantity of fat in yoghurt is 2,8 instead of 3,2.I mean, it makes no sense.

Vučić labeled students as opposition activists who will not see the police intervention, "which they wish for". He said he supports "love between rector and students", adding "it is super for her not to enter her office in 15 days...it would be ideal for her not to do anything for another 15 days". Even pro-government media described the entire Vučić's approach as ironic. He said there is nothing rude in his statement that "she is in political love with members of the opposition parties". Brnabić said she will not yield to the "ultimatum of 15-20 students" and sack Mali from the government, calling protests an anarchy and "hostage crisis". Popović called for all politicians to respect the autonomy of the university and freedom of thought and expression of its students, responding that with the 21st century technology, she doesn't have to sit in her office all the time anyway.

Vučič also stated that Mali doesn't need diploma cause he may be a minister with only an elementary school education, since it is a political decision. Response from Karapandža and others was that this is not an issue at all - what matters is whether someone is a "liar and a thief, or not". Vučić's "defense" was described as an indirect admission that Mali plagiarized his doctorate but that it doesn't matter anyway.

=== Defense campaign ===
Professors Todorović and Karapandža were often attacked by the pro-government tabloids and members of Mali's political party. Mali labeled them "twitter professors", adding he will "continue to fight for better and more prosperous Serbia and for the higher quality of life for its every citizen". He described Karapandža as "completely anonymous individual" who attacks him for political reasons. Tabloid Alo in August 2017 sent a letter to the dean of the Wiesbaden university, asking him to fire Karapandža whom they accused of plagiarism and of smearing the names of Serbian citizens. Independent commission was formed by the university which cleared Karapandža of all allegations from the letter, labeling them materially incorrect and non-academic, with the university supporting Karapandža in debunking the fake doctorates. Alo refused to publish the rebuttal. Rectors and deans from the Belgrade University, academics, directors of the scientific institutes and numerous professors, received a letter from professor Đuričin, Mali's original mentor and member of the original doctoral commission. The letter was actually an open discreditation of Karapandža who, among other things, was accused of being part of the "mathematicians clique" which intruded into the economics and caused the 2008 financial crisis. Karapandža also reported continuous threats he received.

The problem with Mali's doctorate already spread outside of the academia limits and became a much wider social issue in Serbia, but after the agreement between the students and the rector was reached, a full blown media attack against university professors began. They were attacked by the pro-regime media, highest state officials, members of parliament and members of the ruling party. Main focus was on two most media exposed members of the negotiation team with the students, rector Popović and professor Danijel Sinani, on professors Karapandža and Teodorović from before, but campaign was also directed against other professors who publicly denounced Mali's doctorate, like Danica Popović and Ognjen Radonjić.

Accused directly by Vučić and Brnabić for "crossing the red line" and losing her neutrality for agreeing with the students, rector Popović said: "I am not neutral. I am on the side of the University". It was claimed that her "paternal uncle was Stalinist and head chopper", it was called for governmental inquiry against her, while the university was labeled an opposition lair. She was also mocked because of her appearance and dressing style ("physically neglected", "cleaning lady"). Sinani was attacked on ethnic lines, especially on Happy TV. The executive and host Milomir Marić declared Sinani the "representative of Thaçi and Haradinaj", who, being an Albanian, teaching Albanian language and having "suspicious surname", has no moral grounds to judge anything in Belgrade. Marić said that Sinani is teaching some "roka mandolina" (Albanian folk song which became quite popular in Yugoslavia in the 1970s). Sinani, however, is not Albanian but Gorani, teaches Folk religion of the Serbs and several other anthropology of religion classes, was a longtime president of the National Committee for the Intangible Cultural Heritage of Serbia and a pivotal member of the team which helped inclusion of kolo, gusle and slava as Serbian elements on the UNESCO Intangible Cultural Heritage Lists.

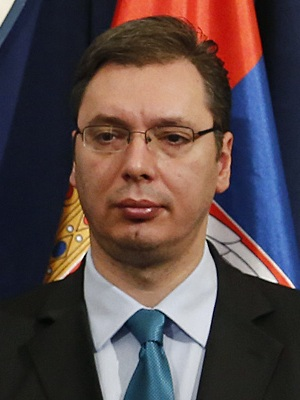
President of Serbia Aleksandar Vučić, though admitting he hasn't read Mali's thesis, claimed it was not plagiarized. He verbally attacked and insulted professors and public figures who debunked Mali's plagiarism

Danica Popović was accused of plagiarism. Vocal opponent of the regime in general, and already cleared by the faculty commission, she became target of continuous, highly aggressive plagiarism campaign. Tabloids also accused one of the opposition leaders and former mayor of Belgrade, Dragan Đilas of bribing members of the FON's Ethics Commission to vote in favor of plagiarism. They claimed Đilas "bought" one professor for €50,000, while promised another one office of the dean after the government change. However, student-prorector Danilo Potparić claimed that one member of the Student Parliament offered him a bribe to vote that the thesis is not plagiarized. He was offered to "split the money" with the person who offered it, but after he refused this person said it was just a joke. Potparić didn't want to disclose the name of this person. Potparić was to be re-elected, but he and the university's teaching-prorector Petar Bulat were removed from the session, delegates who supported his re-election were replaced and another student was then elected instead of him.

Tabloid Alo continued to call Karapandža a plagiarist, accusing him of "spitting on everything Serbian" and of campaigning against Serbia. He was described as the cutpurse and "scientific abomination". All government tabloids and TV stations at the same time published the story, claiming the truth behind the campaign against Mali. According to this, Siniša Mali as the chairman of the Board of Directors of Komercijalna banka in 2013, refused to buy the software sold by the Center for Innovation and Finance (CIF), a company where Karapandža was one of the shareholders and was inventor of the software. One year after Mali refused to buy the software, Karapandža posted that his PhD was plagiarism. Karapandža gave the exact data when CIF was actually invited to a tender by the bank. It was in 2009 and 2017, while Mali was board member from 2013 to 2014, which can be confirmed by the board members from the EBRD. He added that Mali is doctor as much as Dr. Dre or Dr Nele Karajlić. Dejan Šoškić, former governor of the National Bank of Serbia, also refuted the claim. Karapandža and Šoškić were then accused of "wasting" another bank, Srpska Banka. Additionally, Karapandža was accused of falsifying report on his plagiarism from his university. Karapandža was also accused of "robbing" and racketeering other banks and being a member of the "mafia octopus".

Karapandža responded that he may be the head of the Mexican drug cartel but that doesn't diminish the scale of Mali's [intellectual] theft. He compared Guttenberg's case, saying that Serbia not only can't compare to Germany, but can't be compared to Zimbabwe either. The doctorate of Grace Mugabe was annulled after 4 years, while President of Zimbabwe (and her husband) Robert Mugabe wasn't organizing press conferences in New York, from the annual United Nations General Assembly session, to call professors who caught Mali in stealing the "haters [of Serbs and Serbia]", like president Vučič did.

For the short period of time, media star of the pro-regime media became student Aleksandar Jakšić. He initially accused Danica Popović of textbook plagiarism and then for selling the grades to her students behind the closed door of her cabinet. Every time he would appear on TV, he had more and more papers with him, weaving the web of corruption which included all the major accusers of Mali for plagiarism and generally summarizing government accusations against them. He called Popović and her assistant Jelena Rašković criminals and filed official complaint, but the Faculty of Economics cleared Popović of plagiarism. She responded that she has been attacked because of Mali's doctorate, that Jakšić bragged he is a cousin of Bratislav Gašić, head of Serbian Security Intelligence Agency (BIA), and reported Jakšić to the disciplinary commission. Jakšić then denied he is Gašić's cousin. After several disciplinary commissions, where Danica Popović was the first professor to report the student, it was proved that Jakšić accused her of selling exams on one of the faculties public discussions (he said it was an "open secret"). His defense was that he has the right to say things even without any proof or witnesses, cause his oppionion is not the claim ("You can't do anything to me"). He found no witness to support him at the commission, while Popović's witnesses, other professors and academics, Jakšić called out for the lack of credibility. He was supported by president Vučić who said that Popović is "the professor who is harassing the student who stood up to her at her class". The commission gave the sanction of strict reprimand to Jakšić, while Popović asked for him to be sacked from the faculty.

Months later, Jakšić continued to call out Popović, but then also accused Karapandža of plagiarism again, despite his university cleared him already. He then involved Karapandža, former governor and professor Šoškić, and professors Boris Živković (whose co-authored work Mali plagiarized), Branko Urošević (Karapandža's former mentor) and Milojko Arsić (who debunked president Vučić's claim on the state of Serbian economy) into the corruptive "web of professors". Jakšić claimed he discovered some of the things by "accidentally clicking the mouse". He also attacked professors Teodorović and Srbijanka Turajlić of corruption and hypocrisy. After a while, Jakšić disappeared from media.

The attacks were so wide and below any professional standards, that even some government controlled agencies reacted, not just the independent ones. Ministry of Culture and Information issued a statement calling for strict following of the Serbian Journalists Code and "generally accepted moral norms", labeling the attacks "unsuitable rhetoric" and "unacceptable...pejorative, false and incriminating context". Regulatory Authority for Electronic Media (REM) filed charges against Happy TV. Several journalists associations filed criminal charges against Milomir Marić from the Happy TV, who personally attacked professor Sinani. Support came from the students and number of faculties, professors and civil organizations, which deemed the attacks loathing and chauvinistic, or continued to further debunk Mali's doctorate. Still, the operation "defend and protect plagiarism" continued, with the entire "machinery employed to defend the doctorate", while the university remained under the "barrage fire" by the state representatives.

In Mali's defense, government media claim that while for the "five and a half years every word is being measured" in Mali's doctorate, in the world, up to 20% of plagiarism is allowed if it's "not essential", and that EU University (which doesn't exist) confirmed that Mali's doctorate is not plagiarism.

== Fourth faculty commission ==
=== Decision ===
The FON's Ethics Commission formed the same Experts Commission as in January 2019, which on 23 October 2019 submitted exactly the same report as the previous time, that percentage of plagiarism doesn't call for any sanctions. The commission dismissed all complaints, claiming that the only important thing is the scientific contribution, even though that was not the merit the commission was formed to judge. Accepting this report, two days later, the Ethics Commission submitted its own report to the NNV, but this time adding it hadn't "enough facts" but that there are "elements of non-academic conduct", recommending "public reprimand" of Mali.

Prior to the session of the FON's NNV, the students covered the entrance with the messages against plagiarism. One of the FON's professors, Mirko Vujošević, labeled the students "terrorists" and said that faculty shouldn't mess with this at all and let the university to deal with it. The NNV accepted the report but changed the recommendation to "public condemnation", the stricter type of sanction. Some members of the council stated that this practically instructs the university's Ethics Board to annul the doctorate. Representative of the FON's students in the NNV, Moma Kovačević, stated that this means Mali has no support of the council anymore. Several council members wanted for the council to vote directly on plagiarism, but this was ignored by the FON's dean Milija Suknović. Hence, the faculty never actually voted whether the work is plagiarism or not. This didn't stop pro-government media to report that it was again voted that the doctorate is not plagiarism.

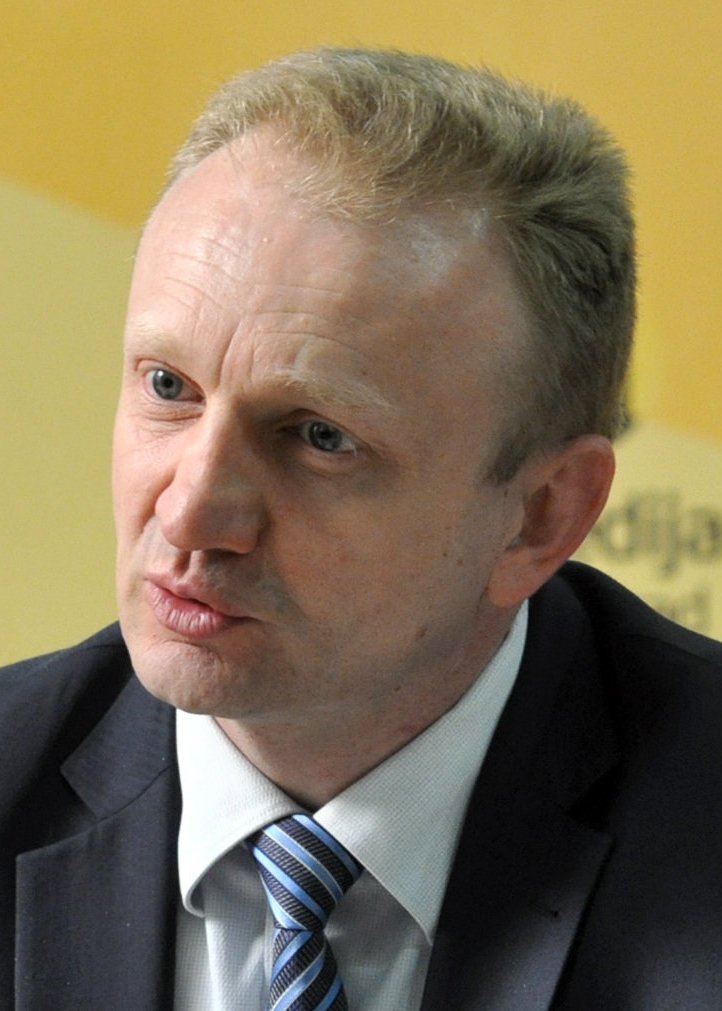
One of the opposition leaders Dragan Đilas was accused of paying the students to protest and of buying off members of commissions which deliberated on Mali's doctorate

The report sent to the university's Ethics Board had more than 699 pages, analyzing the doctoral dissertation. The commission's members (Erić, Čater, Kandžija, Mikerević) requested a meeting with board members to substantiate their views about the indisputable scientific contribution of Mali's work. The decision was a further controversy: the work was not declared unoriginal or plagiarized, but the author was to be admonished for his non-academic behavior. Dean Suknović, although obliged to do so by the decision, didn't reprimand Mali with a "public condemnation". It was later discovered that Suknović tried to skip the process and avoid the NNV vote by sending the commission report directly to the university, thus evading FON's obligation to make a decision, but the rector returned it back to the faculty asking them to follow the procedure.

=== Reactions ===
Mali stated: "I am glad they again confirmed my doctorate is not plagiarism, because I know I wrote it, I am confident in my knowledge, I am confident in what I have done. But here, for some errors that were made I will accept the responsibility and let's move on". He accused opposition of politicizing and spinning the issue, labeling them as fascists. Mali also added that he would "most gladly tear his doctorate and write another one" and that opposition is attacking his doctorate because they have no plan or program and can't say anything bad about him because "salaries and pensions are rising".

General public consensus was that Mali (jokingly called "financial guru") will stay in office, despite everything. He was openly called out for his lack of moral and for not showing the shred of remorse because of the affair and the damage it brought. He blamed everyone else, calling the process political, but it became political because of the behavior of the ruling establishment which pressured the academia. Though Mali previously stated he takes responsibility for the quotation mistakes, he first relativized the issue saying that "they claim they have found 6,97%", but in the end he completely rejected any fault, blaming the original doctoral commission instead: That's not even my error, it is an error of the commission, cause, someone was looking at it.

Given the date when the FON made its decision, in order to follow the due process and because of the deadline for complaints, the final date for decision was moved to 11 November, or 13 November in case of the rector's complaint. Citing further procedure, rector Popović then gave 22 November as the final date, apologizing to the students, who decided to wait, but without any apologies, pleads or concessions after that date. The students repeated they will resume the blockade if Mali's deoctorate is not declared a plagiarism, regardless of the new, private, ununiformed security guards who suddenly appeared in the Rectorate building, restricting movement of the students. When rector Popović came to the hall, new guardsmen hid from her. Some professors publicly announced they will join the blockade this time. Rector confirmed there will be no more returning of the decision back to the FON and that decision by the university board will be final.

This time, a group of over 200 university professors filed a joint complaint against the decision of the FON. Later, four other complaints were filed, lifting the number to almost 300 professors. For the first time, Mali also filed complaints in his favor. Three complaints, one by him and two by his attorneys, had a total of 3,000 pages. He didn't claim the doctorate is not a plagiarism, but cited numerous formalities and technicalities in the process claiming he never received any decisions from the academic institutions, that no one of the persons who filed complaints since the process began actually have the right to do so and that filed complaints are not properly structured. Because of this, his attorneys planned to file counter-complaint to every complaint by the professors.

== Ethics Board ==
On 21 November 2019, university's Professional Ethics Board overturned the faculty's decision and unanimously confirmed the non-academic behavior of Siniša Mali while writing his doctorate. Rector Popović stated he violated the Article 22 of the university's Code of professional ethics, because he literally included texts and entire passages in his dissertation, without naming the original authors. The Board also reprimanded Suknović for only suggesting the reprimand of Mali, and not going through with it, as it was his duty. The Board sent its decision to the Senate to make the final decision in accordance with the guidebook on the process of nullifying diplomas and other works. The terminology used was "non-academic behavior", but the rector later that day clarified that it was a case of plagiarism. Professor Vladeta Janković said that the original commission, and especially Mali's mentor, should be next, while professors Biljana Stojković and Teodorović announced further complaints against Mali's PhD mentor, all members of the commission which endorsed his doctorate and all members of the commissions which declared his doctorate a non-plagiarism. Popović ended her statement with words "We'll be seeing each other more. Pleasant day".

=== Board findings ===
The decision was formalized and made public on 28 November 2019. The Board deliberated on the complaint by the rector Ivanka Popović (compilation of 5 academia complaints) and on the complaint by Siniša Mali and his attorneys Andrija Đurović and Nemanja Vasiljević. By the Board's decision 10 br. 612-2294/34-19, the decision of the FON's NNV was overturned and the non-academic conduct of Siniša Mali was confirmed. They concluded that Mali violated article No. 22 of the university's Code of professional ethics - plagiarism. Mali's complaint, that is, a request for the re-evaluation of the FON's decision was rejected as inadmissible.

The FON's decision was classified as unlawful since it lacks clear explanation, description and qualifications of the non-academic behavior for which it suggested reprimand of Mali. Also none of the commissions and the NNV failed to comply to the previous guidelines by the Board in order to improve the decision and all of them showed lack of readiness to establish true and complete facts relevant for the matter. Especially since, in this case, the facts were indisputable and easily established by simply comparing Mali's doctorate with the works of other authors. Failure also include the fact that they never included copied text from Haimelariam's dissertation into the plagiarized section of Mali's thesis (the previously reported 6.97%) and inability of different faculty bodies to take one, joint stand on the issue.

As the FON decided not to compare Mali's thesis with other works, the Board took it upon itself to do it. The results of the comparison with Haliemariam's work showed that on 35 pages, Mali copied Hailemariam's thesis (with the detailed list of pages from both doctorates). Of those, 30 pages were plagiarized more than 50%, while 16 are completely or almost completely copied so the Board concluded that Mali literally copied (translated) Hailemariam's work which is neither referenced nor mentioned in the bibliography, nor the text was marked with the quotation marks. The Board's stance was that an aggravated circumstances for Mali include copying of entire passages and pages, and adopting Hailemariam's references as his own. Out of 96 footnotes, Mali took from Hailemariam 51, or more than a half.

The Board then compared the doctorate with the study Novi model privatizacije u Srbiji by Begović, Živković and Mijatović. Mali copied the study on 9 pages in total, of which 2 were coped more than 50%. He even included plagiarized work from the study in the conclusion of his thesis. The study is, just like the Hailemariam's dissertation, never mentioned in his work (references, footnotes, bibliography, no quotation marks).

Taking all this in account, the Board made a decision on plagiarism, which was described as "evident and indisputable". Mali's complaints on the process were dismissed, with detailed explanation of the regulations. Regarding Mali's complaint that he wasn't allowed to participate in the process, the Board said that Mali sent his reply to the FON's request on 14 December 2016, while all documentation regarding the matter was sent by the Board to him so he wasn't excluded. For another Mali's complaint, that the complaints against the FON's decision were filed by unauthorized persons, the Board explained that those five individual complaints were only parts of compiled rector's complaint, and the rector is authorized to file it. Also declared inadmissible was Mali's complaint regarding his reprimand by the FON. The faculty's NNV only suggested it, while it has no power to actually make it effective. It is dean's duty, but since he never did it, the complaint was pointless. As president of the Board, professor Vuk Radović signed the decision.

=== Reactions ===
"It is hard for me. It is hard a lot because I worked arduously all my life, I know how much effort I made to be the best pupil and the best student. And then it is hard for me to accept decision of political commissions so because of that I will continue to fight" - Siniša Mali on decision that he plagiarized his doctorate

Mali commented on the decision: "I am confident in my knowledge. I know I did not do it. This topic means to some people for political reasons and that I can not even comment. In any case, in the next few days I will address this topic more extensively, and now, to be honest, I am interested in the budget of Serbia and to deal with what I have been paid for by the citizens of Serbia". President Vučić said he is not surprised by the university's "deeply political decision" and continued to insult and dispute people who were active in debunking the plagiarism, or were connected to them, adding Mali is doing "excellent work". He asked who gave "them" the right to dispute Mali's doctorate, labeling them "half-literate", "highly uneducated leaders of political parties", "uneducated elite", "worst students" or, ironically, "great experts". Vučić said that this decision confirms he is not a dictator, since this is a political decision aimed against the government and that such things were impossible under he previous regime, so he concluded that Serbian society advanced greatly.

The government establishment was described as finally coming to the realization that the plagiarism was actually confirmed and its reaction was characterized as orchestrated, not so much as an effort to clear Mali's name, but to provide excuses for keeping him in the government. Both prime minister Brnabić and president Vučić said that Mali will remain in office. With other ministers, deputies and party members, they all called the university's decision a political one, praising Mali's economic achievements. Brnabić said that the obvious indicator this was a political decision was the talk show "360 Stepeni" on N1, non-nationwide cable channel from 31 October, three weeks prior to the Board's decision, when two leaders of the non-parliamentary opposition parties, Dragan Đilas and Sergej Trifunović expressed their firm belief that the doctorate will be annulled. The claims of fierce opposition forcing the university to bring anti-government decisions is contrasted by other, concurrent claims from the government, that the opposition is almost non-existent, unimportant, utterly disliked by people and that no one would vote for them.

Commentators noted the unpleasantness, as the push from the position in charge of pressure (president Vučić, "it is decided there is no plagiarism in Mali's work, he just messed some footnotes"), with all mechanisms for enforcing the pressure, actually failed. It was first such slap in the face of the government after a long time. Reaction of prime minister Brnabić was deemed especially nervous.

Rector Popović said that the decision is academic and made by experts, without presumption of Mali's capacity in the government. On the parliamentary session where the budget, presented by Mali, was discussed, almost every deputy from the ruling coalition spoke about the political decision of the university and praised Mali, calling for his stay in the office. Speeches included: explanations that he wasn't elected because of the doctorate but because of his expertise, calling a Daltonist everyone who can't see this is a political decision, calling university pathetic, mocking the students, claims of conspiracy that this is just the first step in annulment of all doctorates obtained by the members of the ruling party, labeling the process of annulment as the amounting of various destructive energies and a conspiracy against president Vučić, labeling the plagiarism as "allegedly some kind of plagiarism". Some labeled the rector as "Mali's executioner" and called for her to resign instead of Mali.

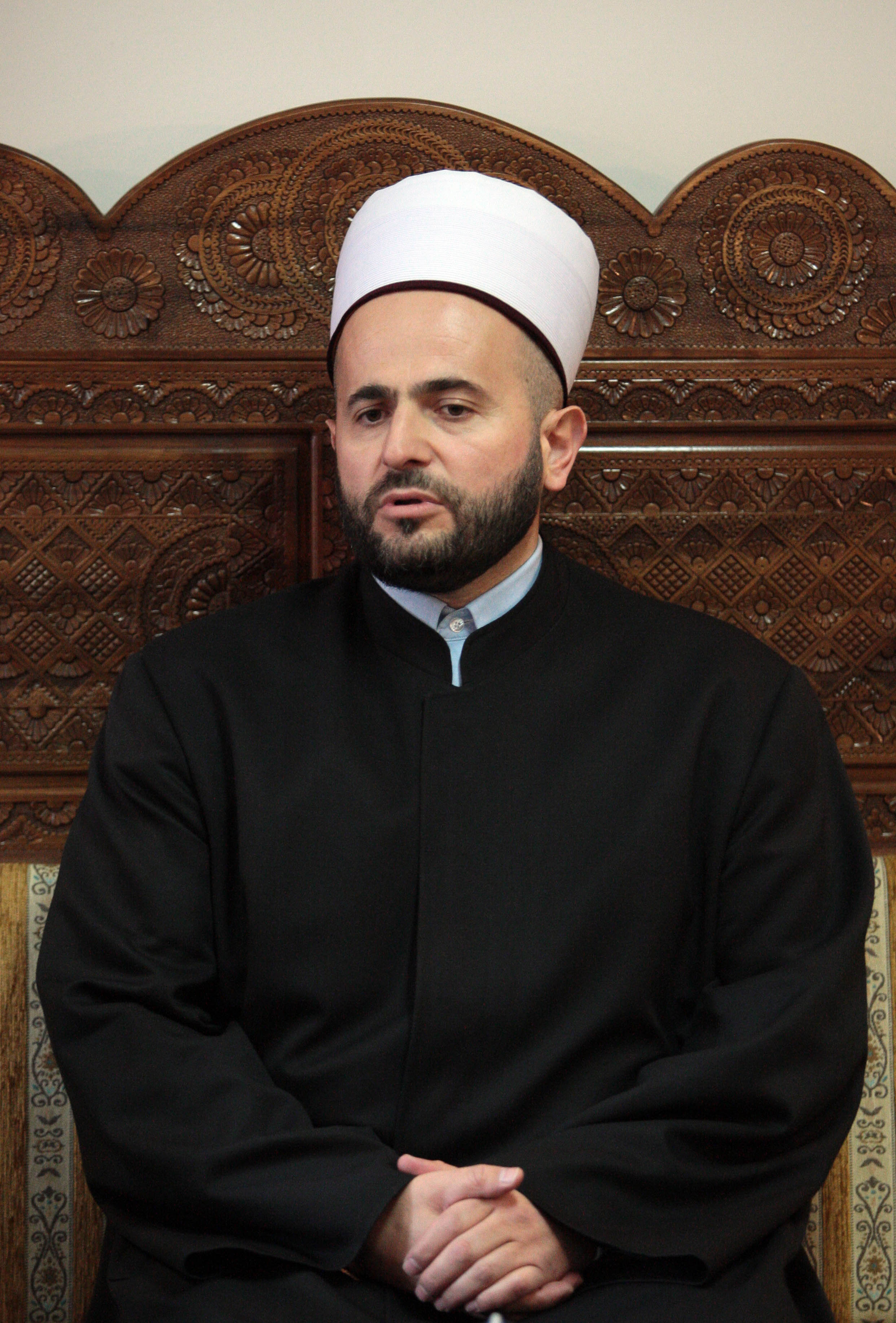
Muamer Zukorlić, president of the Education Board of the National Assembly of Serbia, urged president Vučić to "deal with the University" as he saw the plagiarism process as an anti-government rebellion. "Either you will get them, or they will get you", he said

Tabloids called Mali to keep the office and not to pay attention to the "danglers". Some views were even more extreme. Head of assembly's Education Board Muamer Zukorlić called the process "rebellion against the government" and a "bad sign". He stated that if this "clash with the government" is taken lightly, it will be an "announcement of fiercer attacks". He labeled the plagiarism happenings as the fire that is not to be underestimated and a systemic disease. He openly warned Vučić that he must not pass this as it is, otherwise it will be "either you will get them, or they will get you". Zukorlić founded private International University of Novi Pazar in 2002, which worked ever since but was never accredited. Though leader of the Justice and Reconciliation Party, Zukorlić was nominated to head the assembly's Education Board by the Vučić's party. Opposition contested his election to the post in 2016 as a blatant conflict of interest.

Organization MASA (Academic Solidarity and Engagement Web) stated concern with how much vengefulness and anger was in parliamentary speeches against the university. They especially named Zukorlić for his call on Vučić to deal with the university, and asked from his removal from the position of the board president. Zukorlić said that his call for the reckoning between Vučić and university was "poetic", but that examining only Mali's doctorate because he is a politician is dishonest and criticized opposition for debunking the fake doctorates of the ruling establishment. Some professors pointed out that because Mali is a politician in the ruling establishment, the process actually dragged for so long.

Vučič said he will propose the state financed digitalization of all existing magister and doctoral theses, so that anyone can read and compare them, especially the doctorates of Karapandža and Bojan Pajtić, former president of the Democratic Party. However, the doctoral theses are already published publicly since 2014. He also sent mixed signals saying that he has no intention to bow in front of the political decisions but also that Mali has to pay the political price, not specifying what and when:

When I was in New York, Siniša was angry at the time, I told him - I don't understand what are you doing. But, Siniša Mali has to pay the political price, and we will see what and how in the future. And that is because he made the wrong judgment and because three months ago you could show the entire Serbia that you don't give a damn and to tear that doctorate, but you didn't do it. To tear it now - it is pointless and without any meaning. I think that he is doing excellent work. I feel sorry for Siniša, I see this hit him very hard, but I can't help him. I advised him long time ago to tear that thing and to go to defend it again in front of everyone, to write the new thesis, to invite all the people to see that, to hear that. No, no, I fought for this, I invested so much effort. Well, there you have it now.

In Mali's defense, Vučič compared his ordeal with one of the greatest Serbian authors, Danilo Kiš. In an interview with Milomir Marić at "Happy TV", where he is regular (talk show Ćirilica), he said: Do you know who was investigated, whose doctorate was abolished, under question? Well the great Danilo Kiš. So I think that it is much more important what Siniša Mali can do for the country in the public finances department. However, this was false information as Kiš had no PhD at all. He was actually accused in 1977 of plagiarizing one of his major works, A Tomb for Boris Davidovich and managed to defend himself in court, though the controversy remained. Writers and literature critics heavily criticized comparison between Kiš and Mali, calling it the brutal disrespect of cultural values, bizarre, distasteful and shameful mudslinging of Kiš for which Vučić should apologize. Even more so, as Kiš wasn't declared a plagiarist, while Mali was. Some other reactions were ridiculed, like the statement of Mali's colleague in the government, Minister of Transportation Zorana Mihajlović, that plagiarism is a private matter between Mali and the university.

Opposition parties and movements asked for Mali's resignation. Several protests and marches were organized by the "Ne Davimo Beograd" movement, asking for the removal of Mali from the government. Students who organized the blockade of the Rectorate declared a victory. A group of students from the "1 of 5 Million" movement organized a march which ended in the park which encircles the House of the National Assembly of the Republic of Serbia where they organized a symbolical funeral for the 2020 budget of Serbia, stating that Mali must not be the one who is tailoring a budget. Managing of the state vault by Mali has been described as giving the goat to guard the cabbage by professor BIljana Stojković. On the protests and marches Mali has been given the red cards, which was the title of the march ("Red card for Siniša Mali"). The students objected his staying in office openly saying that the thief can't draft the budget. Activists from "Ne Davimo Beograd" chained and locked the building of the Ministry of Finance.

The Board for Higher Education of the Serbian Academy of Sciences and Arts supported University's Board decision and its right to make decisions within its authority. President of the board, professor Todorović continued to be under the attack of the regime media, and at one point said that building of one of the major propaganda televisions, Pink TV, should be demolished. Pink TV's owner, Željko Mitrović, in his usual manner when he confronts someone who is critical on him, his TV, or president Vučić, wrote an "open letter", which was then aired several times a day for several days. Among other things, he called Teodorović "the stupidest and least talented person among the academy members". Serbian Academy condemned Mitrović's behavior and his insulting of Teodorović on political basis.

Opposition and the students also accused Mali of taking a revenge on the Belgrade University as the money allocated for the university in the state budget was reduced from 19.24 billion dinars (€163.75 million) in 2019, to 18.71 billion (€159.25 million) in the new budget for 2020, which was proposed in November 2019. Mali called them liars, saying that the university budget consists of two parts: one funded by the state and one filled by the university's own income. He stated that the part provided by the state was enlarged by 804 million dinars, or €6.85 million (10.4 to 11.3 billion dinars, or €88.5 to €96.2 million), but university planned much lesser income, hence the total reduction. Mali addressed the opposition: "You probably know, and you should ask the leadership of the university, you know them better than I do, why is their own income lower, so their total budged is lower, too".

The news on Mali's plagiarism made worldwide news. On the other hand, despite the years long tensions, which especially escalated in 2019, none of the regime tabloids printed the news on the annulment on front page.

== Annulment by the Senate ==
On 12 December 2019, the Senate of the Belgrade University unanimously and officially annulled Mali's doctorate due to the plagiarism. When it comes to the university procedures, the decision is final and there can't be any further complaints regarding the matter. Actually, the Senate only accepted the Board's decision, without opening the debate on the issue. The FON's dean Suknović, member of the Senate, this time voted for the annulment of Mali's doctorate.

The university sad that Mali has the right to file the complaint to the Administrative Court. The court can't discus or revert the merit of the Senate's decision, but can return it to deliberation due to the technical reasons in the deliberation process.

=== Reactions ===
Mali initially refused to comment on the decision. On 15 December 2019 he said he is "targeted by the opposition, so as president Aleksandar Vučić" because they can't "forgive the success" of the two and that he doesn't report to the opposition, but also praising his own economic knowledge and patriotism. After Danas newspaper published an article on Mali's biography on his ministry website where he kept data on his doctorate, he deleted it on 22 December 2019, ten days after the official annulment. A record of his doctoral studies remained for a while longer on the official government's site, but it was removed later, too.

Calls for his resignation continued. Some members of the opposition and various civil associations (like the UZUZ, Association for the Protection of Constitution and Law), continued to send motions to prime minister Brnabić to sack Mali from the government. Other, like the investigative journalists editorials commented that we finally awaited at least one of Mali's affairs to be concluded, but asked what happens with the entire string of other, more serious, material affairs which followed him for years, some of which, indirectly, even caused fatalities (illegal acquisitions of various companies by him and his father, tax evasions, numerous of-shore companies, illegal acquiring and concealing of assets, participation in corrupt privatizations, money laundering, ownership of 45 bank accounts, illegal, night demolitions of objects in Belgrade). Political scientist Boban Stojanović said that Mali would surely be removed from office if he wouldn't be involved in major corruption affairs and obtaining large amount of funds for his party, reminding on his further affairs, like 24 apartments in Bulgaria and dubious businesses of his brother, but "Mali is obviously the person on whom the functioning of this government depends" and "he is doing important work for Vučić personally and for the party".

== Later developments ==
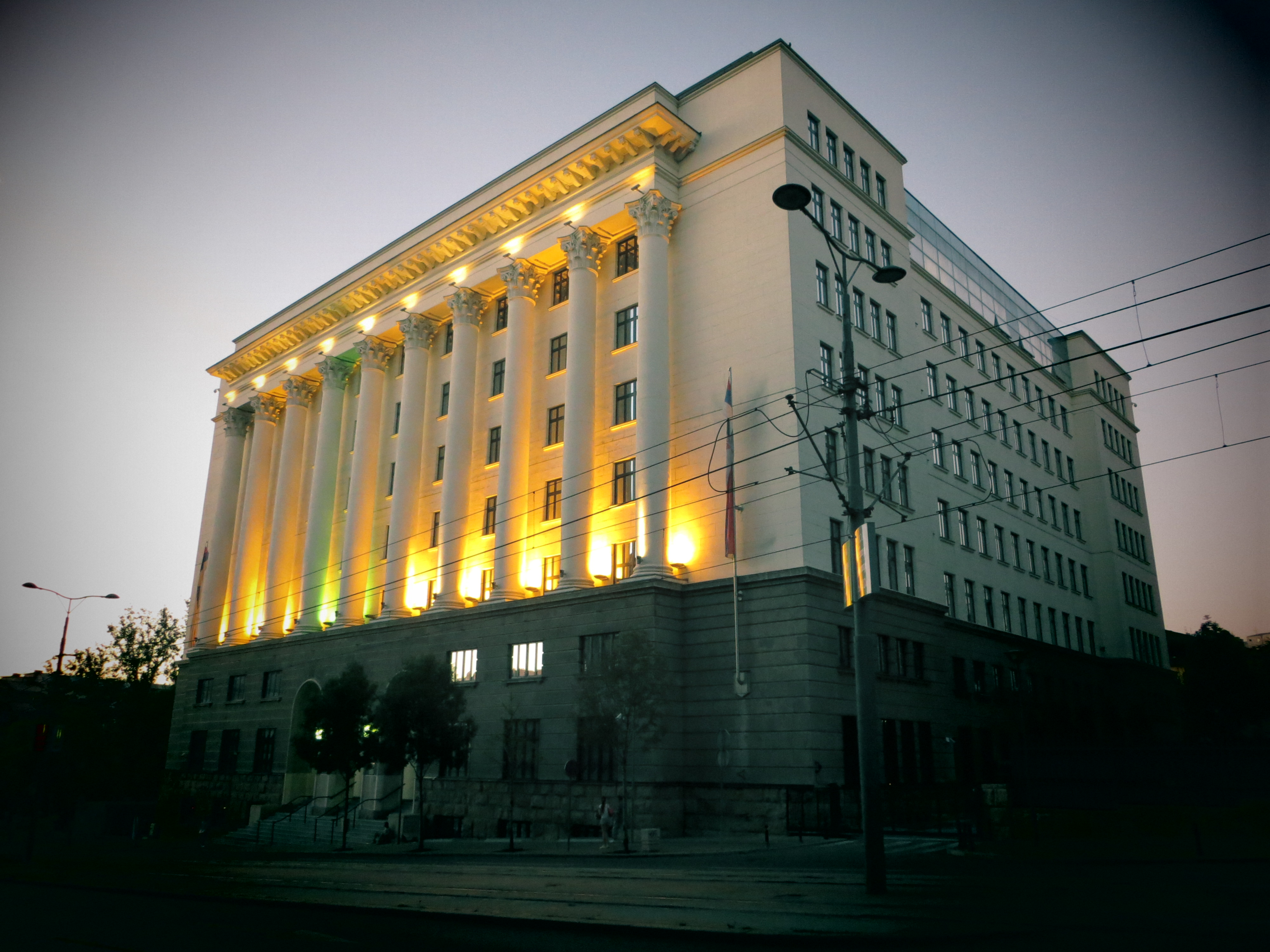
Court building hosting, among others, the Administrative Court, where Siniša Mali filed the complaint against the university's decision on his plagiarism

Milka Babić, spokesperson for the Administrative Court, confirmed that Mali filed the complaint against the Ethics Board's decision on 17 December 2019. The complaint has no effect on the possible postponing of the university's decision. Though the possible court's decision concerns only the technical and procedural aspects of the process, his intention to defend his plagiarism at court, when it was already confirmed by the academia, was described as pathetic effort. Professor Vesna Rakić Vodinelić had an insight in Mali's complaint and confirmed that it is not tackling the plagiarism itself. She said that based on the law, the complaint should be dismissed, but since Serbia has no judicial practice in this matter, everything is possible. Professors Biljana Stojković and Slobodan Prvanović agreed that Mali can't overturn the decision anyway, calling his complaint pointless and noting that this way Mali is the one actually keeping the affair alive. None of the professors are familiar with any previous case of plagiarism decision being defended at Administrative Court.

Professor Karapandža ironically said that due to Mali's denial of plagiarism, he will eventually have to write the book, where he will debunk in detail Mali's doctorate. He said that there are even more bizarre things that have been copied than cotton. He also mentioned publishing of detailed threats he received, misuse of the Security Intelligence Agency and interstate scandal which he kept quiet about so far because he wanted to avoid the politicalization of an academic matter. Karapandža, who continued to dissect the doctorate, claimed that he has evidence that plagiarized text already crossed the amount of 40% and that there is more to be checked.

On 31 December 2019, Mali announced that he is going to write the new doctorate "in the second half of the year", as he was thinking actively about it since the "unfortunate political decision". In the meantime, he added, he is preparing another exam for the management of the alternative investments saying he passed the first, though the pass rate was only 52%. Mali also said he previously acquired the CFA. Mali stated he always had much faith in his knowledge and abilities, that he is not quitting anything and that he will always fight. He was considering conditions for doctoral studies both in Serbia and abroad, saying he will invite "everyone" to go with him to the exams.

In February 2020, daily Politika published an article on fake theses, after interviewing one of the ghost writers, who was familiar with the business since 2008 but knows some cases from the 1990s. It takes about two months to draft the doctorate but those who are more skilled or versed can compile it in a month. Some openly advertise their work on the Internet but majority still operates on recommendation, especially after the scandals broke out. They also write graduate and undergraduate dissertations, scientific works, etc. Minimal price is €1,000. The client provides the subject and basic literature, while the rest of the sources are procured online by the ghost writer or "if we take a real effort, we go to the library". Special attention is given to the parts that mentor is paying extra attention to.

The interviewee admitted having a guilty conscience sometimes, but if he doesn't take the job someone else would, and he needs money. However, he expressed his surprise with the complete lack of guilt by the clients. He divides them in three groups: 1) those pressured by their parents and spouses to get a degree even though they don't want to; 2) those who want to progress professionally and earn higher salaries based on the education coefficient; 3) those who are legit doctoral students and started the process, but were halted by other things in life and never finished it.

On 25 May 2020, a group of 20 professors filed a complaint to the FON's ethics commission regarding non-academic behavior of Mali's mentor, FON's dean and all members and presidents of the various commissions who kept confirming Mali's doctorate through years: Milija Suknović, Jaško Ondrej, Dragan Đuričin, Slađana Barjaktarović Rakočević, Milica Bulajić, Nevenka Žarkić Joksimović, Mladen Čudanov, Srđa Bjeladinović, Veroljub Nastić and Miloš Krstanović. They also asked for the public reprimand of Čudanov, because he was member of two commissions. Upon receiving the complaint, the commission has 60 days to submit its opinion to the dean who can then accept it or reject it.

Next month, professor Đuričin was appointed by the Serbian Chamber of Commerce to head the jury which should declare the best student's doctoral dissertation for 2018/2019. That same month, the FON endorsed Čudanov's candidacy for tenure, as he is an associate professor. His colleagues from the FON defended him, saying he is one of better teachers, that students gave him an average grade of 4.88 out of 5, asked whether the professional career of the brilliant candidate should be destroyed and is he the only or the major culprit. Čudanov also defended his participation in the commissions, saying he is not guilty of anything, distancing himself from the plagiarism process adding that all of this is endangering his health, work and peace. Professors who filed complaint said that Čudanov's expertise is not an issue, but ethics and that he shouldn't be teaching at university at all.

In July 2020, the university added a clause to the Ethics Code by which the members of the commissions can't be liable for the views they express or the way they voted during the plagiarism procedures. Rector Popović stated this will empower the professors' free convictions, independence and impartiality, but the professors who opposed the clause said that the commission members are now devoid from ethics and that it was specifically introduced to shelter those who participated in Mali's case over the years. In October 2020 Čudanov was given the tenure, with only one vote against in the Senate. Popović said there was no reason to punish Čudanov for his views, citing the newly added clause.

== Aftermath ==
=== Politics ===
In the end, Mali suffered no political or legal consequences. Same goes for all those involved in confirming his doctorate through the years. During the entire scandal, Mali even progressed politically, being appointed to head or oversee the bodies which either investigated his business affairs and scandals or disputed his various claims like the Ministry of Finance or the Administration for the Prevention of Money Laundering (APML). From the position of the mayor of Belgrade in 2014 when the scandal broke, he was appointed to the post of the finance minister on 29 May 2018, thus the APML becoming hierarchically subordinated to him. Mali continued to amass public functions and was appointed as the head of the Coordinating Body for the Prevention of Money Laundering and Terrorism Financing on 4 July 2019. In this capacity he presented the state Strategy for the Money Laundering Prevention, which was adopted by the government in January 2020.

Already in September 2019 journalists and editors Branko Čečen, Stevan Dojčinović and Aleksandar Đorđević, from three major investigative networks in Serbia (CINS, KRIK and BIRN, respectively), anticipated that Mali will stay in office even if plagiarism is confirmed. On the question by Olja Bećković, the host of the talk show Utisak nedelje, is there a chance that Vučić will let Mali down the drain as part of his exit strategy, Čečen said that he doesn't think it will happen since various political and financial interests are so tightly entangled. Dojčinović explained that, as the key man of the [Vučić's] system, Mali is "as steady as a rock" and he most certainly won't be let off. Crucial thing about Mali is that he is one of the main experts for the grey economy in Serbia. He added that for the large part of his career, Mali was opening offshore companies and operated through them, and was hired and paid by the people who wanted to hide their assets.

=== Media ===
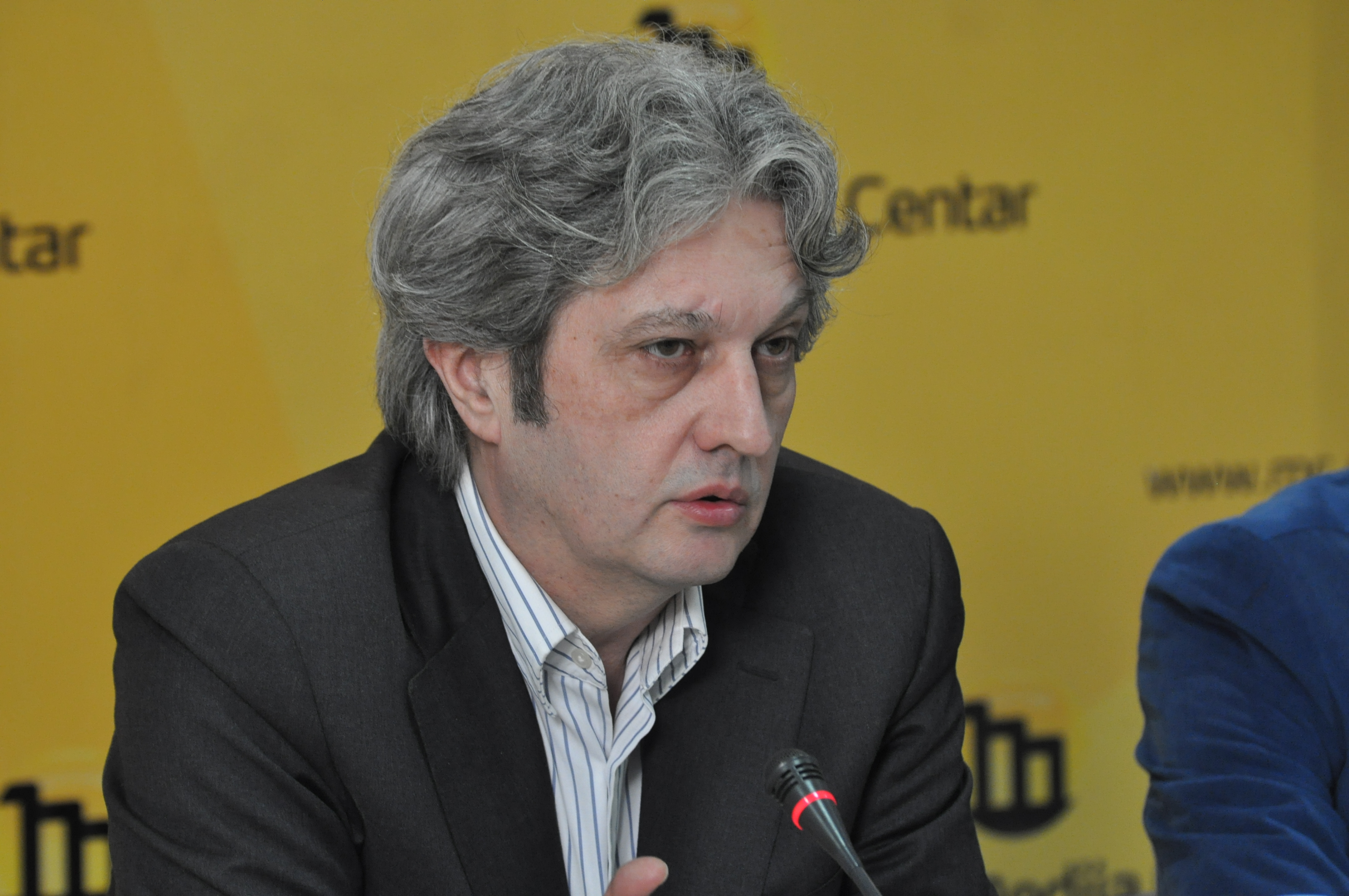
Milomir Marić regularly hosts president Aleksandar Vučić in his talk show Ćirilica. The academia described his behavior as shameful and unconstitutional while dismissal of charges against him by the prosecutor's office was described as unprofessional and confirmation of corruption

After the official annulment in December 2019, the state media switched to mostly ignoring the issue. Ultimately, none of the media were sanctioned. Criminal charges filed by several media organizations against Milomir Marić, the editor and host "Happy TV", were dismissed by the Higher Public Prosecutor's Office (VJT) in January 2020. Charges were filed by the "Slavko Ćuruvija Foundation", "Independent Journalists' Association of Serbia" (NUNS), "Independent Journalists' Association of Vojvodina" (NDNV) and "Association of Online Media", claiming Marić's report on professor Daniel Sinani was causing national, racial and religious hate and intolerance, but also on a different charge of the damage of reputation because of the racial, religious, national or other affiliation. VJT's deputy prosecutor Nenad Stefanović replied there is no reasonable suspicion that the deed was done, or any other deed which should be prosecuted in official capacity within the jurisdiction of VJT. The charge on reputation damage was forwarded to the lower, Basic Public Prosecutor's Office, which has a jurisdiction over the matter. Stefanović's answer was actually just one piece of paper which lacked the necessary parts of the legal response, like the explanation or legal remedy.

Investigative network "Cenzolovka", which published the news, was heavily criticized by the Association of Judges and Prosecutors of Serbia (UST). In the statement it was also said that the dismissal was legal, that it has an explanation but that they have no intention of educating "Cenzolovka" when and to whom the explanation will be sent. President of the UST is prosecutor Stefanović, the one who dismissed the charges, and in its statement, the UST said this fact can "only be impressive". The UST was founded on 4 September 2018, even though both the judges and the prosecutors already had their separate professional associations. Stefanović stated at the time that the UST will follow guidelines of the MEDEL, European association of judges and public prosecutors. However, already in November 2018, the MEDEL warned that the UST is actually a GONGO, formed by the government to confirm and justify opinions and visions of government officials.

Colleagues of professor Sinani from the Faculty of Philosophy called the prosecutor's office unprofessional, stating that Marić's behavior wasn't just shameful but against the Constitution and its Article 21. According to professors, the actions of prosecutor Stefanović showed that everyone who is socially critical and not follow the wishes of the ruling party becomes victim of the media prosecution and despise. They also concluded that this case clearly shows the intertwinement of the regime media, vulgar TV shows, subjugated and occupied prosecutor's office and politics of the ruling party. Sinani said he is not surprised at all by the dismissal and that he expected such epilogue since the "institutions are not functioning". He added that he won't meddle into the prosecutor's job: "He has his arguments and this decision will remain in his biography. Let him deal with it".

Nevertheless, they all filed complaints and the Appellate Prosecution Office dismissed them all in February 2020. From the Appellation's response it was evident that the VJT reduced all charges to the damage reputation before forwarding them to the Third Basic Prosecutor's Office, without notifying the attorneys of the plaintiffs. Also from this papers the conclusions of the VJT became public, as they refused to disclose them previously. The VJT concluded that Marić didn't show hate or intolerance to any nation, he simply stated his mind on an actual subject and that his words were taken out of the context, even though the show was aired live.

=== FON ===
Citing FON's handling of the Mali's doctorate scandal as their starting point for credibility re-check, Center for Education and Evaluation in Science (CEES) announced in May 2019 that journals published by the FON are dropped out from SCIndeks. The reason given is the faculty's "compromised ethical status". The ban includes all three journals published by the faculty (Info M, Management and YUJOR). The CEES also included in its decision a huge number of works and texts published by the FON professors in the predatory journals (91 work and 257 authorships in 3 years period only). They qualified the faculty's behavior in this matter as a "bizarre saga".

=== Belgrade University ===
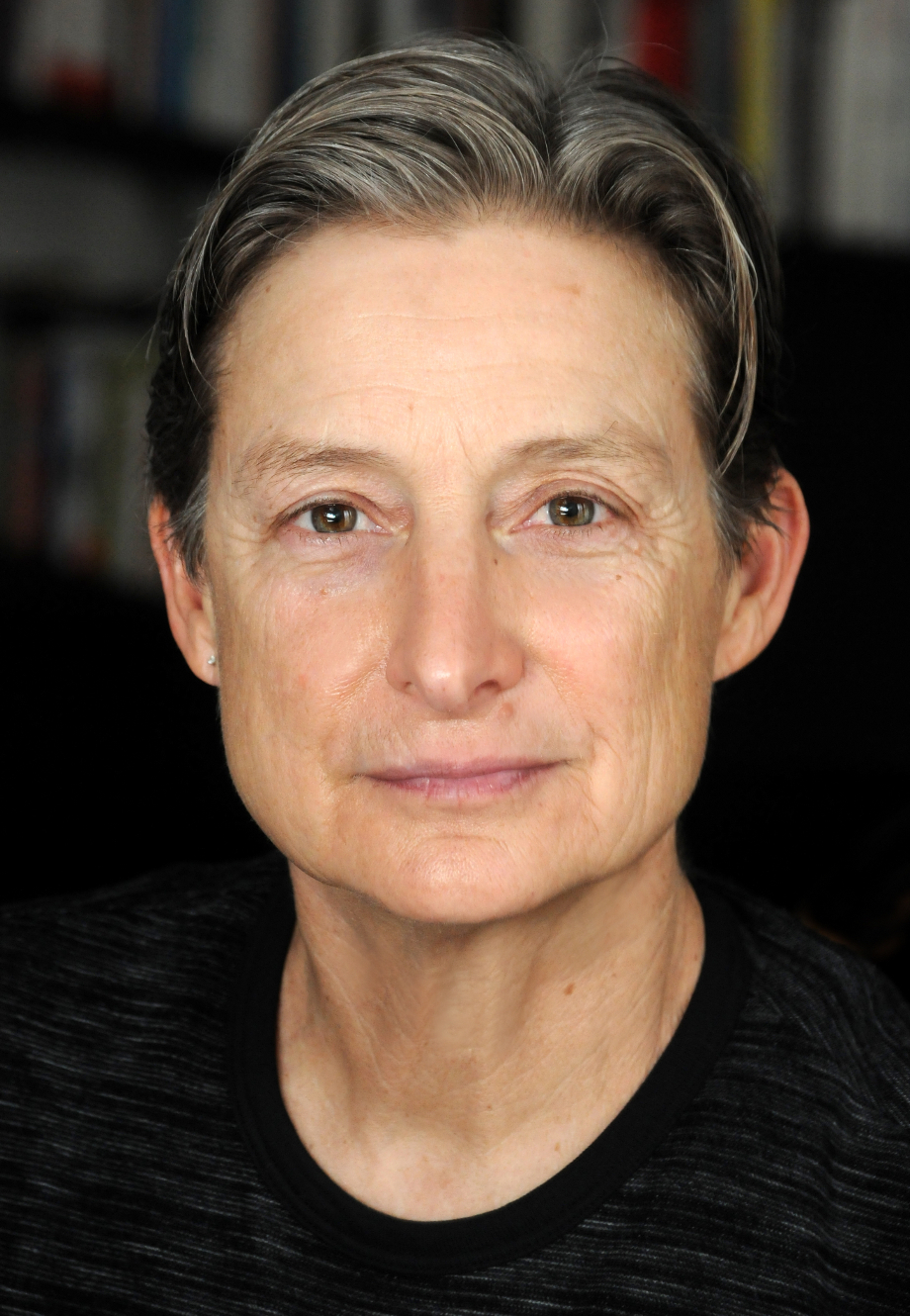
Philosopher Judith Butler visited Belgrade University and supported students

University was criticized for dragging the process for so long. When the scandal broke in 2014, neither the university, its Ethics Board, and especially the FON, showed no interest into solving the problem. University's decision to annul the doctorate in the end was, however, praised, as preservation of the integrity and ethical courage. Though the university corrected its mistake, saving its honor, reputation, dignity and autonomy at the last moment, it was harmed by the years of its servility and silent acceptance of the pressure form the government and the tabloids. The process was also described as the "five and a half years long stain".

Rector Popović stated that the case of Mali's doctorate harmed the reputation of the university. Former rector Marija Bogdanović said autonomy went down the drain five and a half years ago when Vučić said that plagiarism charge is the "stupidest thing he has ever heard". University of Belgrade Faculty of Philosophy issued a statement warning that the reactions of the government officials during this process further downgraded the reputation of the university. Tinde Kovač Cerović, professor and former state secretary in the Ministry of Education, said that Mali, with his plagiarism and denial, inestimably damaged the entire educational system. Since he didn't step down, she proposed him to do raise the salaries of professors and at least do something good.

Berkeley physics professor Jasmina Vujic visited students during the September 2019 protest, calling doctorate an obvious plagiarism and that 5 years long process damaged university's reputation so much that at Berkeley they are now cautious on accepting Belgrade University students at doctoral studies. Former head of the Ethics Board, professor Radmila Vasić, confirmed that the reputation is damaged and that from various sides they get warnings that Serbian students are more thoroughly checked when applying for doctoral studies. Judith Butler, who visited Belgrade University few weeks later, supported the protest and said that "academic liberty is a political matter".

In 2018, the European Association for Quality Assurance in Higher Education (ENQA) placed the membership of the National Entity for Accreditation and Quality Assurance in Higher Education of Serbia (NAT) under supervision. After two years, the ENQA concluded in March 2020 that the NAT remained under the influence of the government, instead of being independent and reduced the NAT's membership from full to the adjoining member. Government appoints majority of the NAT's Administrative Board members. Also, if the NAT refuses to give credentials to some school or university, they appeal to the National Council for Higher Education (NSVO), where majority of members are also appointed by the government creating a way of bypassing the accreditation body. While the government downplayed the importance of the ENQA's decision, some academia members stated that this might mean additional checks of the Serbian students who continue postgraduate education in foreign countries, but also that the demotion of the NAT is "the price for the tolerance showed by the both private and state universities towards the suspicious diplomas of the politicians". Government's majority in both the NAT and the NSVO, so as removal of the students' representatives from the bodies (another complaint by the ENQA), were achieved by the amendments of Muamer Zukorlić, which were then endorsed by the Vučić's ruling majority.

Fake diplomas and titles, especially that of Mali, became regular part of performance acts in students' protests which in turn are part of the wider political protests in Serbia since 2018.

=== Plagiarism procedures ===
During the course of the scandal, several changes were made regarding the academic plagiarism. The Law on High Education was changed in 2014, with added obligation for doctoral dissertations to be publicly available. In July 2016, new codes were adopted at the university, which regulate doctoral studies and plagiarism, so as the new ethical code of the university.

Though lack of the proper procedure was used as a defense of Mali by prime minister Brnabić ("I ask both myself and those who are decision makers, if you retroactively decide based on the 2016 code for something that happened in 2013, does that mean you can judge retroactively any doctoral dissertation"), the plagiarism was always forbidden at the university by its former ethical codes. Rector Popović responded that there is no statute of limitation for plagiarism.

In January 2020, the university adopted the 4th version of the anti-plagiarism code. Rector Popović said that number of reports for suspicion of plagiarism grew "in the previous period" and that, with new and simplified procedures, and acquirement of further anti-plagiarism software (like iThenticate), she expects further rise in the number of reports. She added that all decisions will be publicly announced by the university, in order to make the process more transparent. In February 2020, Popović said there were 9 or 10 reported plagiarized doctorates in the deliberation process at the university.

On 19 February 2020, the Senate amended the code again, adding an automated termination of employment as the clear consequence of plagiarism. This is opposed to the previous sanction, which included only stripping of the academic title. The change was prompted by the case of professor Aleksandar Jakšić. Among several other plagiarisms declared by the university in 2019, there was a decision from 9 October regarding the school book International private law by Jakšić in which he plagiarized some 100 pages from German law professor Bernd von Hoffmann. He complained to the Administrative Court which adopted his appeal regarding technicalities of the process. As Jakšić was already sanctioned for previous indiscretions, the Faculty of Law fired him on 4 February 2020 citing damage he invoked to the faculty due to his plagiarism. On 18 February, the Labor Inspection ordered the faculty to hire Jakšić again, as the inspector took upon herself to judge if Jakšić's plagiarism damaged the reputation of the faculty or not, instead of checking whether the technical, formal and lawful procedure was applied.
