= Nebojša Stefanović =

Serbian politician

- Небојша Стефановић
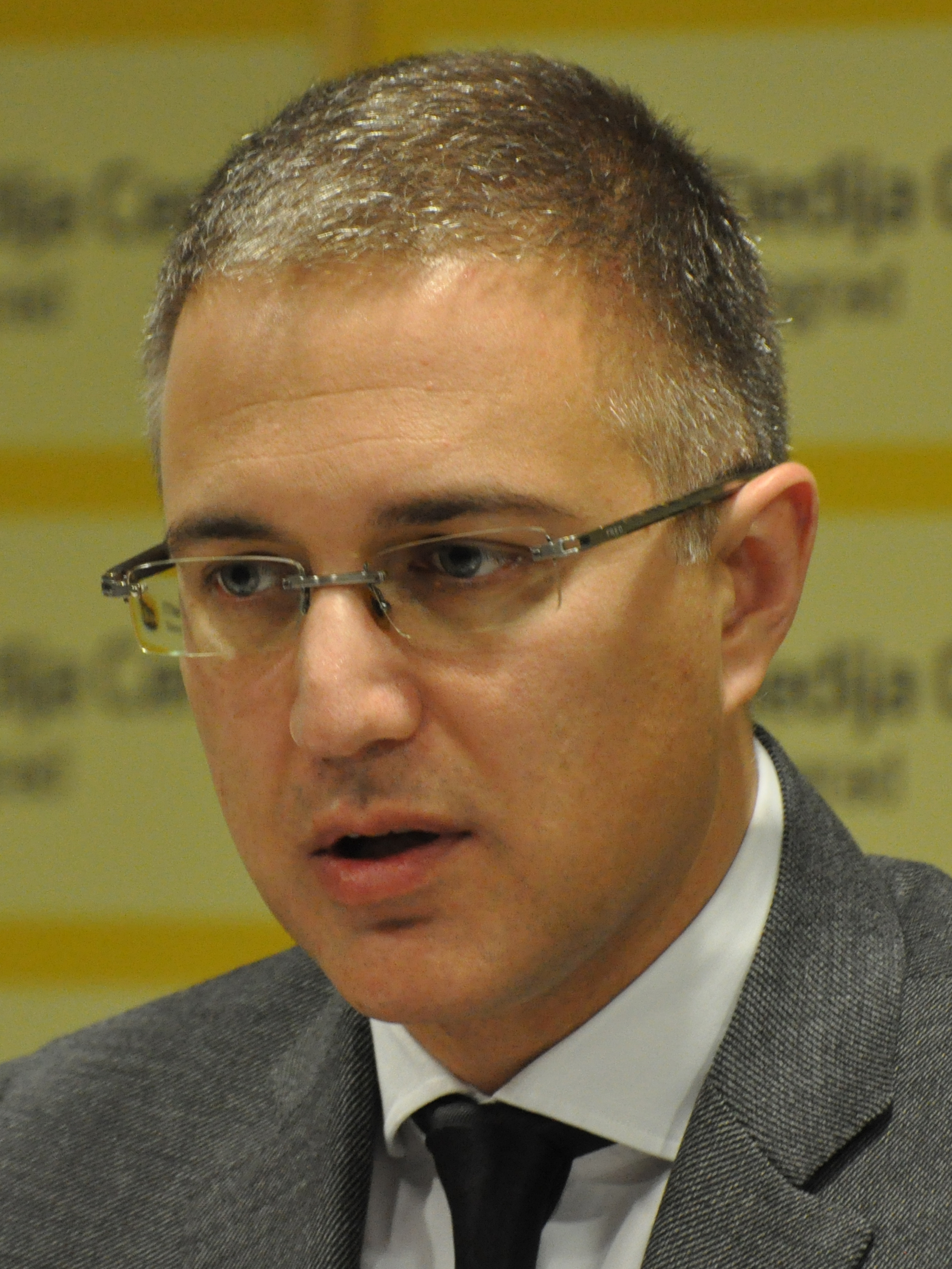
- Stefanović in 2018

Deputy Prime Minister of Serbia
- In office 11 August 2016 – 26 October 2022
- Prime Minister: Aleksandar Vučić; Ivica Dačić (acting); Ana Brnabić
- Preceded by: Kori Udovički
- Succeeded by: Siniša Mali

Minister of Defence
- In office 28 October 2020 – 26 October 2022
- Prime Minister: Ana Brnabić
- Preceded by: Aleksandar Vulin
- Succeeded by: Miloš Vučević

Minister of Internal Affairs
- In office 27 April 2014 – 28 October 2020
- Prime Minister: Aleksandar Vučić; Ivica Dačić (acting); Ana Brnabić
- Preceded by: Ivica Dačić
- Succeeded by: Aleksandar Vulin

President of the National Assembly of Serbia
- In office 23 July 2012 – 16 April 2014
- President: Tomislav Nikolić
- Preceded by: Slavica Đukić Dejanović
- Succeeded by: Maja Gojković

Personal details
- Born: 20 November 1976 (age 49) Belgrade, SR Serbia, SFR Yugoslavia
- Party: SRS (2001−2008); SNS (2008–present)
- Children: 2
- Education: Megatrend University
- Occupation: Politician
- Website: nebojsastefanovic.rs

Nebojša Stefanović (Note: Serbian Cyrillic: Небојша Стефановић, pronounced [nɛ̌bɔːjʃa stɛfǎːnɔʋitɕ]) (born 20 November 1976) is a Serbian politician who served as deputy prime minister of Serbia from 2016 to 2022 and as minister of defence from 2020 to 2022. A member of the Serbian Progressive Party (SNS), he previously served as president of the National Assembly of Serbia from 2012 to 2014 and as minister of internal affairs from 2014 to 2020.

Initially a member of the Serbian Radical Party (SRS), he was one of the founding members of SNS in 2008. Additionally, he served as chairman of the Belgrade board of SNS. Stefanović holds a disputed PhD in economics, which caused controversy.

== Early life and education ==
Nebojša Stefanović was born on 20 November 1976 in Belgrade. He grew up in New Belgrade, where he finished elementary school and IX Grammar School "Mihajlo Petrović Alas" in Belgrade. He graduated from the Graduate School of Business Studies of the Megatrend University. He received his master's degree in Economics defending his master's thesis Contemporary Principles of Management in Local Self-Government in 2011. Furthermore, in June 2013, he earned his doctorate in Economics with the thesis A New Role of Strategic Management in Managing Local Self-Government.

He has begun his business career in 2004 in domestic and foreign trade company "Interspeed Ltd." on the position of Marketing Manager. In 2008, he was appointed on the position of deputy financial director of company "Jabuka."

Nebojša Stefanović speaks English and Russian. He has two children.

== Political career ==
Stefanović has been involved in politics for more than 25 years. He has begun his political career in the Serbian Radical Party (SRS). He is one of the founders of the Serbian Progressive Party (SNS), member of the Presidency and chairman of the Belgrade board of Serbian Progressive Party from 2008 to 2021. As the chairman of the Belgrade board, he made significant achievements along with his team. In the 2014 Belgrade City Assembly election, SNS came to power with 43.62% votes, while in the 2018 election, SNS won again with 44.99% votes.

From the establishment of the SNS until the fourth assembly of the SNS (held in 2016), he was a vice president of the main board of SNS.

=== Member of Parliament ===
As a representative of SRS, He was a councillor in the City Assembly of Belgrade during the 2004–2008 tenure. In the 2007 parliamentary elections, he was elected for member of the National Assembly of Serbia, and in the same time he served as Chair of the Committee for Trade and Tourism of the National Assembly of the Republic of Serbia.

In the 2012 parliamentary elections, as a representative of SNS, he was reelected for member of the National Assembly of Serbia and councillor in the City Assembly of Belgrade.

=== Speaker of the National Assembly of Serbia ===
From July 2012 until April 2014, Nebojša Stefanović was Speaker of the National Assembly of Serbia, as well as the Chair of the Committee for the Rights of the Child. Moreover, he was a Head of Delegation of the National Assembly of the Republic of Serbia in the Inter-Parliamentary Union.

During his tenure as speaker of the National Assembly, he was remembered for his struggles and commitments to pregnant women and mothers. On his initiative, the Law on Right to Healthcare for children, pregnant women and maternities was adopted. He also launched the notable initiative Priorities for children and pregnant women, which is in force up to this date.

=== Deputy Prime Minister and Minister of Internal Affairs ===
After the 2014 parliamentary elections, he was appointed on the position of the minister of internal affairs. He was reelected on the same position after the 2016 parliamentary elections, as well as appointed for the deputy prime minister. He has remained on the same positions after the 2017 cabinet reshuffle.

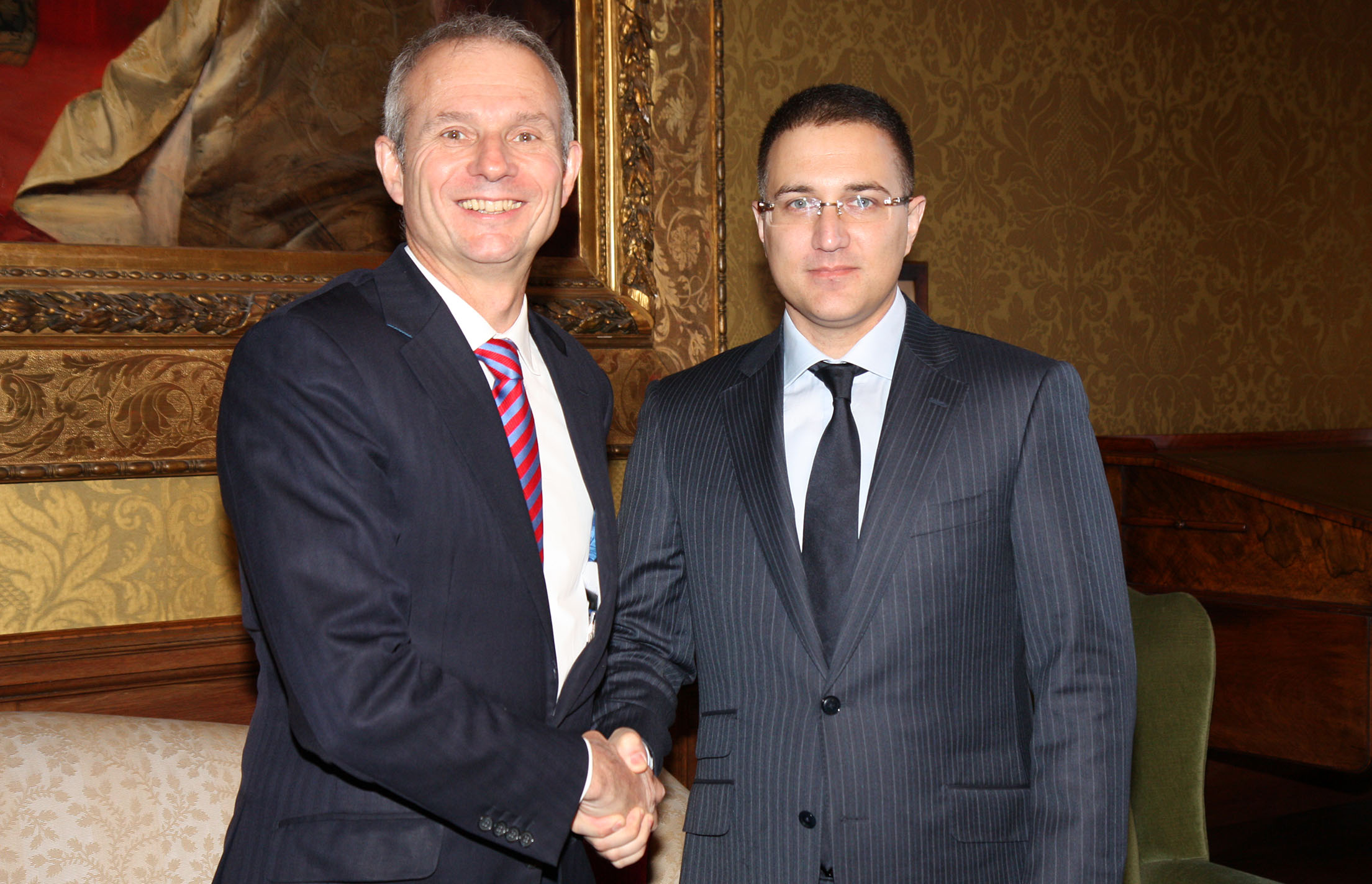
Stefanovic meets with Minister for Europe David Lidington in London on 8 December 2014.

During his tenure as the minister of the interior, numerous of reforms have been implemented. One, out of his many personal initiatives, was implementation of the program Children Security Basics in the first, fourth and sixth grades of elementary schools in Serbia. The purpose of this program is to introduce children with all challenges and dangers they can encounter.

He is the first minister of the interior which has launched the initiative for building of the monument for the fallen police officers in Belgrade.

Besides these, he has been holding position of the president of the Council for the fight against human trafficking, commander of the Headquarters for emergency situation of the Republic of Serbia, the president of the National Council for fight against hazardous occurrences in sports, as well as the president of the Coordination team for guiding activities in fight against money laundering and terrorism financing. From 7 November 2017, he was appointed as a Secretary of the National Security Council, and at the same time the Head of the Bureau for Coordination of Security Services.

=== Deputy Prime Minister and Minister of Defence ===
On 28 October 2020, the National Assembly of the Republic of Serbia elected a new Government of the Republic of Serbia led by the Prime Minister Ana Brnabić. On 29 October 2020, the newly elected Minister of Defense Nebojša Stefanović, assumed the office from the former Minister, Aleksandar Vulin.

In May 2021, SNS municipal boards began voting on removing Stefanović from the party and state offices.

== Controversies ==
=== Doctorate controversy ===
On 1 June 2014, a group of Serbian academics based in the UK published an article claiming that parts of Mr. Stefanović's doctoral dissertation were plagiarised.

In June 2014 the Senate of Megatrend University formed a commission with the agenda of evaluation of merits for initiation of the procedure for his doctorate annulment. The university Senate then adopted a report from the Commission which stated that there were no grounds for initiation of the procedure for the Nebojša Stefanović's doctorate annulment. In August 2014 another independent Commission was formed by the Senate which later unanimously ruled that there were no grounds for initiation of the procedure for Nebojša Stefanović's doctorate annulment.

=== Krušik arms export scandal ===
A letter dated 27 April 2017 from Serbian private company GIM, to Serbian state-owned arms company Krušik Valjevo lists the names of three GIM representatives and three Raniad Al Jazira employees who visited the arms factory in order to inspect and accept the ordered weapons. Among the GIM representatives was Branko Stefanović, Nebojša Stefanović's now deceased father.

According to documents leaked by whistleblower Aleksandar Obradović, a Krušik employee, Nebojša Stefanović's father Branko Stefanović was involved in the purchase of mortar shells at privileged prices from Krusik.

In December 2019, then Minister of Defence Aleksandar Vulin said the whistleblower was a spy and that the scandal was an "operation" to attack the Serbian regime, specifically the then Minister of the Interior Stefanović, and ultimately the President of Serbia, Aleksandar Vučić.

== Notes ==
Political offices
Preceded by Slavica Đukić Dejanović	President of the National Assembly; 2012–2014	Succeeded by Maja Gojković
Preceded by Ivica Dačić	Minister of the Interior; 2014–2020	Succeeded by Aleksandar Vulin
Preceded by Aleksandar Vulin	Minister of Defence; 2020–present	Incumbent
