= Aleksandar Obradović (whistleblower) =

Serbian whistleblower (born 1979)

- Born: 2 March 1979 (age 46); Valjevo, SFR Yugoslavia (Now Serbia)
- Education: Academic business school in Valjevo
- Occupations: Professional basketball player for KK Metalac Valjevo (until 1999); Manager in Krušik Valjevo (until 18 September 2019)
- Employer: Mladen Petković (until 18 September 2019)
- Known for: Leaking documents revealing corruption inside state-owned company Krušik Valjevo
- Mother: Miljana Obradović
- Awards: Honorary citizen of Šabac; City of Šabac's award in category of development of democratic values and respect for human rights and freedoms; The brave voice

Aleksandar Obradović (born March 2, 1979) is a Serbian whistleblower who leaked documents which revealed corruption and fraud inside of a state-owned company Krušik Valjevo. He was arrested on 18 September 2019 on his workplace for charges of espionage and was transferred to central prison in Belgrade. His arrest triggered multiple protests across Serbia. On 14 October 2019 decision by Belgrade high court was made by which he was released from prison and sentenced to house arrest. After multiple protests and public pressure Obradović was released from house arrest on 18 December 2019. Investigation against him is still ongoing but there has been no indictment. French branch of Amnesty International called Obradović "Serbian Snowden" He is currently unemployed as his suspension from Krušik hasn't been lifted.

== Personal life ==
=== Family ===
Aleksandar Obradović was born on 2 March 1979 in Valjevo one year after his parents moved from Tutin. His father worked in factory Srbijanka and his mother got a job in Krušik Valjevo in 1980. Both of his parents finished universities. His mother graduated with the best grades, according to Obradović, his mother is a fantastic programmer and she gives him great support. His sister was born when he was five years old.

=== Education ===
He finished his first 8 years of education in elementary school „Žikica Jovanović Španac“ in Valjevo. He further pursued his education in economic high school and in Academic business school, in which he got his diploma.

=== Basketball career ===
At the age of 8 he developed a love for basketball, and begun training in basketball club Metalac. He became a captain of his generation which started making remarkable results on tournaments and he was always in top three scorers of the league. He became a professional player for Metalac but his displeasure with treatment of players by the club caused him to leave professional basketball at the young age of 20.

== Krušik arms scandal ==
=== Document revealing ===
In 2014 Mladen Petković, member of the ruling party, became a general manager of the factory. He often clashed with the staff of the factory and created what Obradović called "atmosphere of tension and fear". Since then Obradović began collecting examples of his mismanagement, once Obradović was promoted to a manager he discovered financial fraud. In 2017 company GIM which was represented by father of government politician Nebojša Stefanović bought arms from Krušik by a privileged price which according to Obradović was "unreasonably low, bordering on loss". After this deal GIM has grown from having an annual profit of few millions to over a billion. Obradović leaked sale documents to investigative journalist Dilyana Gaytandzhieva who discovered that weapons exported by GIM ended up in hands of ISIS fighters in Yemen. She called for Serbia to end arms sales to Saudi Arabia because those weapons finished in hands of terrorists, she got no response.

=== Arrest ===
At 3 PM on 18 September around 10 BIA agents came to the factory and arrested Obradović, after around 20 minutes he was handed over to officials from prosecution for high technology crime. They transferred him to a police station in Belgrade from where he was sent to central prison in Belgrade.

== Protests against his arrest ==
Protests demanding release were held in Valjevo, Novi Sad and Belgrade with tens of thousands people attending. Speakers of the protests called Obradović "hero of our time" and demanded that he is immediately released. Just two days after Obradović was moved from central prison to house arrest he gave a speech on a protest in Belgrade by telephone. He said that he doesn't see himself as a hero but just as an ordinary man who didn't want to see company that employs thousands collapse because of corruption.
