= Krušik (company) =

Serbian defense company

Coordinates: 44°16′28″N 19°54′21″E

- Native name: Крушик
- Type: Government owned
- Industry: Defense
- Predecessor: Vistad (1939–48)
- Founded: 23 January 1948; 78 years ago (Current form); 22 February 1939; 87 years ago (Founded)
- Founder: Nikola Stanković
- Headquarters: Vladike Nikolaja 59, Valjevo, Serbia
- Area served: Worldwide
- Key people: Jovanka Andrić (General director)
- Products: Rockets; Mortars; Anti-tank missiles
- Services: Production, consultancy, research
- Revenue: ▲€94.81 million (2018)
- Net income: ▼€3.90 million (2018)
- Total assets: ▲€120.54 million (2018)
- Total equity: ▲€32.88 million (2018)
- Owner: Government of Serbia (100%)
- Number of employees: 3,025 (2018)
- Website: krusik.rs

Krušik Holding Corporation (Serbian: Холдинг корпорација Крушик / Holding korporacija Krušik) is a Serbian state-owned defense company that primarily manufactures rockets and mortars.

== History ==
In 1939 a company named "Vistad" in Valjevo was founded by engineer Nikola Stanković in what was then Kingdom of Yugoslavia, for the needs of then Yugoslavia defense industry and army. It produced small caliber (12 kg) aircraft bomb, hand offensive grenades, infantry rifle ammunition. During WWII, farm equipment was produced. After WWII factory was nationalized and renamed to Military-Technical Institute of Valjevo. In 1948 the company was registered under the name of “Krušik”.

In 1999, the company's facilities were heavily destroyed during the NATO bombing of Yugoslavia. As of 2009, Krušik held a large contract to arm the Iraqi army.

After two decades of working in limited capacity, in 2010s the company has begun recording profits, having annual revenues of nearly 100 million euros and exporting in more than 70 countries worldwide. As of 2025, it employs around 3,200 employees and is one of the main companies of defense industry of Serbia.

== Controversies ==
In September 2019, it became public that weapons manufactured by Krušik sold to US Federal contractor Alliant Techsystems ended up in the hands of ISIS fighters in Yemen. This revelation led to the arrest of whistleblower Aleksandar Obradović, an IT worker at Krušik, on suspicion of revealing company secrets. The news of Obradović's arrest had not been made public until one month later, when he was placed under house arrest. On 21 November 2019, the Council of Europe alerted that the whistleblower Aleksandar Obradović is under house arrest.

On November 21, 2019, it was reported that pro-Russian separatists had found an unexploded Serbian mortar bomb in eastern Ukraine. The shells had been traded by Serbian, Cypriot, and Polish companies, and were not authorized by Serbia for export to Ukraine. On 13 March 2022, the Ukrainian defense ministry posted a YouTube video which shows Ukrainian soldiers firing 60mm mortar shells (M73) produced by Krušik in 2018.

On March 3, 2023, Serbia denied allegations of providing Ukraine with arms, following media reports by the Russian online newspaper Mash that they delivered 3,500 Grad G-2000 rockets manufactured by Krušik via Turkey and then Slovakia.

On August 4, 2023, an informational videos by friendlyjordies that detailed the bombing of Papuan villages by the Indonesian government mentioned that the bombs that were being dropped were made by Krušik. More specifically, these were 81mm M72 high-explosive mortar rounds with an improvised fuse with a larger surface area.

== Subsidiaries ==
- RJ-6 "Fabrika akumulatora" - Battery factory founded in 1957. most notably product is battery for MiG-29 airplane and other uses.
- "Krušik-IRC - Istraživačko razvojni centar" founded in 2007 for purpose of development and research in electrical engineering, mechanical engineering and communications technologies.

== Products ==
- Unguided rockets for multiple rocket launchers (M-77 Oganj, M-63 Plamen, M-87 Orkan, LRSVM Morava)
- 60mm, 81/82mm, and 120mm mortars
- Artillery shells, fuses and gun primers
- 9M14 Malyutka, anti-tank missile system (license)
- 9K32 Strela-2, surface-to-air missile system (MANPADS)
- Hand grenades
- Anti tank mines
- Anti hail rockets

== Incidents ==
On 13 December 2013, three employees were hurt during testing of the engine and initial filling of the anti-bumper projectile.

On 6 November 2014, one employee died of injuries he got after the incident on production line.

On 15 May 2015, seven employees were hurt when capsule of hand grenade exploded on the production line.

On 30 May 2025, seven employees were hurt in capsule department of the factory.

== See also ==
- Defense industry of Serbia
