= Bathing Waters Directive 2006 =

Directive 2006/7/EC
- European Union directive
- Title: Bathing Waters Directive 2006
- Made by: European Parliament and Council

Other legislation
- Replaces: Directive 76/160/EEC

The Bathing Waters Directive 2006 (2006/7/EC) is a Directive in EU law that sets standards for the water quality of beaches, lakes, rivers and other bathing waters.

== Contents ==
Under the Directive, member state authorities may identify bathing waters where people are expected to bathe in large numbers.

Article 5 and Annex II set out classifications for bathing waters as either 'poor', 'sufficient quality', 'good quality', or 'excellent quality'. Annex III requires reviews to take place every two years if quality is poor, three years if sufficient, and four years if good.

Annex I defines how the quality of water is judged by measuring levels of human waste such as Escherichia coli and intestinal enterococci, with different thresholds for 'inland waters' and 'coastal waters and transitional waters'.

== See also ==
- Water supply and sanitation in the European Union
- UK enterprise law
- Water Framework Directive
- Drinking Water Directive 2020
- Groundwater Directive
- Marine Strategy Framework Directive
- Urban Waste Water Treatment Directive
