= Beam origin concept =

The beam origin concept is used to describe the mechanisms governing the ecological condition of running waters. It is based on the positive influence of sections in very good condition on sections in less good condition. The idea was first introduced in 2008 by the German Council for Land Stewardship to reach the goals defined in the Water Framework Directive of the European Union.

== Background ==
In order to force politics to take more responsibility in acting against ecological, economic and social problems related to water, the European Union implemented the Water Framework Directive. For each river basin district, member states had to develop, implement and monitor measures to reach its prescribed goals. As a tool to accomplish this goal, so-called river basin management plans were required.

The implementation is an individual matter for the member states and must be reported regularly. In Germany, the German Council for Land Stewardship worked on a project financially supported by the North Rhine-Westphalia State Agency for Nature, Environment and Consumer Protection and Lennart-Bernadotte-Stiftung, in order to investigate how, in the sense of a beam effect, water biocoenoses in restricted areas can be developed and decoupled from a complete structural improvement in the area concerned. The applicability of stepping stones was thereby to be examined for the beam effect of interventions on running waters, as a parallel to wildlife corridors.

== Concept ==
The main driver of the concept is the beam effect, which indicates the influence of sections in very good ecological condition on sections in less good or rather poor condition with respect to their ecological status. There are two categories of beam effects which are biotic and abiotic. The biotic beam effect relies on the migration or drift of typical aquatic organisms; the abiotic beam effect refers to the transport of positive environmental conditions from one directed downstream. In general, the beam effect is not tied to the flow direction of the running water and can occur both upstream and downstream.

In contrast, negative long-distance and vicinity effects cause the opposite effect to the positive beam effect, thus deteriorate the ecological condition of running waters. For instance, negative biotic effects are migration or drift of atypical aquatic organisms, that might have a negative effect on domestic species in their habitats; carry-over of fine sediments, material load or temperature influences are examples of negative abiotic effects on the ecological condition. Another negative effect is given by the so-called colmation, which is the accumulation of fine particles on gravel deposits. Since the pores are used by organisms for spawning, over time the sediments cut off the oxygen supply, cover the gravels with a solid layer and destroy the habitat of local species.

=== Ecological condition ===
The definition of a good ecological status is a matter of interpretation. For member states of the European Union, the Water Framework Directive defines two different ecological target states, which are the good ecological status and the good ecological potential. The good ecological status refers to a natural body of surface water, whereas the good ecological potential specifically relates to a heavily modified or even artificial body of water that was created by human activity.

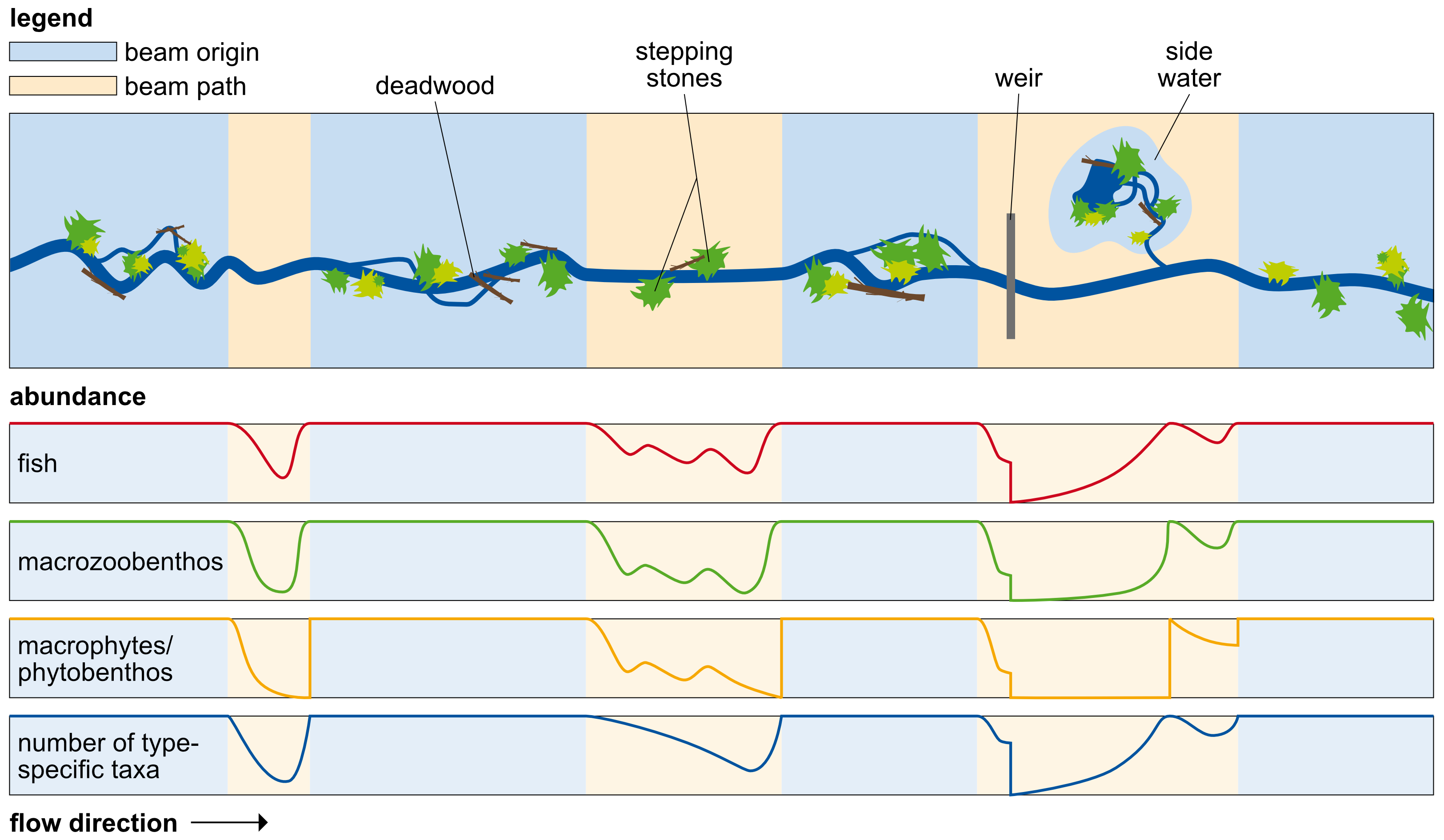
Schematic illustration of the beam origin concept (based on German Council for Land Stewardship 2008)

==== Typical indicators ====
Typical indicators for the evaluation of the ecological quality are the abundances of fish, macrozoobenthos, macrophytes and phytobenthos, and the number of type-specific taxa. Criteria to further classify the ecological status of river sections can be found in the European Directive or in country-specific guidelines.

=== Components ===
==== Beam origin ====
A beam origin (also beam source) is a river section that is in very good ecological condition. The river section may not necessarily be located in the main course but side waters. On the one hand, it shows structural, hydrological and hydraulic quality close to nature; on the other hand, it is the natural habitat of typical organisms that can drift and migrate to other sections. If a beam source only meets the prerequisites for an abiotic beam effect it is called a potential beam origin and it is assumed that in the long-term a typical inventory of species can be formed.

==== Beam path ====
A beam path is a river section of low ecological condition that borders on sections of higher ecological potential. An enhancing beam path is a type of beam path into which organisms of a nearby beam source can migrate or are at least temporarily settle. Furthermore, typical organisms can only drift or migrate through the beam path, which is then called a transit beam path. In a beam path a biocenosis can be established which is only possible due to the presence of adjacent beam origins.

==== Stepping stone ====
A stepping stone is a morphological element that allows organisms to either migrate and settle or drift though the river section. It does not necessarily have to be a stone or a group of stones; large woody debris (LWD), roots or aquatic plants can also have a supporting effect.

==== Degradation stretch ====
A degradation stretch is a river section that by definition meets none of the criteria to be a beam origin nor a beam path. Transverse structures such as weirs or dams can be obstacles for aquatic organisms but also canalised (artificial) river sections possibly prohibit organism to drift and migrate.

== See also ==
- River ecosystem
- Integrated water resources management
- Aquatic ecosystem
