= Danish Marine Strategy =

Contemporary Danish Marine Strategy

Denmark consists of the northern part of the Jutland peninsula and an archipelago of 406 islands bordering both the Baltic Sea and North Sea, and has substantial maritime influence. This prominence is attributed to its expansive coastline, which is the 17th longest in the world, alongside a sizeable Exclusive Economic Zone and role as an Arctic power. Denmark is also home to Mærsk, the world's second largest shipping company and Ørsted, an industry leader in offshore wind, and ranks as the fifth largest seafaring nation in the world^{[When?]}.

Map of Denmark and its coastal waters

In June 2008, the EU adopted the Marine Strategy Framework Directive (MSFD) for marine environmental governance aiming to protect the marine environment across member states, ensuring the oceans are clean, healthy, and productively used. In May 2010, Denmark transposed the MSFD into legislation. After public consultation lasting until 27 August 2012, the first phase of Denmark's national marine strategy was approved. The Danish marine strategy delineates the MSFD's 11 ocean descriptors to realize good environmental status (GES), which include combating eutrophication. In compliance with the MSFD, Denmark must review and update their marine strategy every six years. In 2019, Denmark launched Marine Strategy II, which iterates on the initial plan with refined targets for the 2018-2024 period.

Following Denmark's Marine Strategy I and II's efforts to achieve GES, studies have found hypoxia in Denmark's coastal waters leading to marine life stress and habitat degradation. In September 2023, the total area affected by oxygen depletion was just below 7,500 km^{2} of which around a quarter was affected by severe hypoxia, the second highest mid-September oxygen depletion recorded in Danish waters since 1989. This revelation has resonated across media and political spheres, and the Minister of Environment, Magnus Heunicke, called the situation "alarming". The discovery of heightened hypoxia levels in Danish waters has emphasized the enduring complexities of implementing the Danish Marine Strategies effectively within Denmark's national boundaries and high seas.

== Background ==
In the early 1990s, Denmark positioned itself at the forefront of environmental policy by being the first country in the world to implement an energy action plan with carbon dioxide emissions targets. In this period, Denmark also stood out as one of the EU's most compliant countries in adhering to environmental legislation, often recognized as a 'green pioneer'. Today, both the Prime Minister, Mette Frederiksen, and Minister for Development Cooperation and Global Climate Policy, Dan Jørgensen, highlights the country as a 'green pioneer'. Yet, Denmark's carbon footprint per capita is among the largest in the world and the country has historically struggled to comply with EU regulations on ocean protection.

In 2013, the European Court of Justice found Denmark in breach of the Water Framework Directive. The violation was due to Denmark's delay in publishing and communicating its river basin management plan for 2009–2015. This was initially due on 22 December 2009, but completed on 30 October 2014. Denmark's compliance with the EU's marine directives has been a recurring challenge. In 2019, the Danish authorities sought further extension from the European Commission to fulfill their commitments to marine environmental improvements. The deadlines under the WFD were successfully postponed from 2009 to 2015, then to 2021, with the latest target now set for 2027.

== EU marine legislation and implementation ==
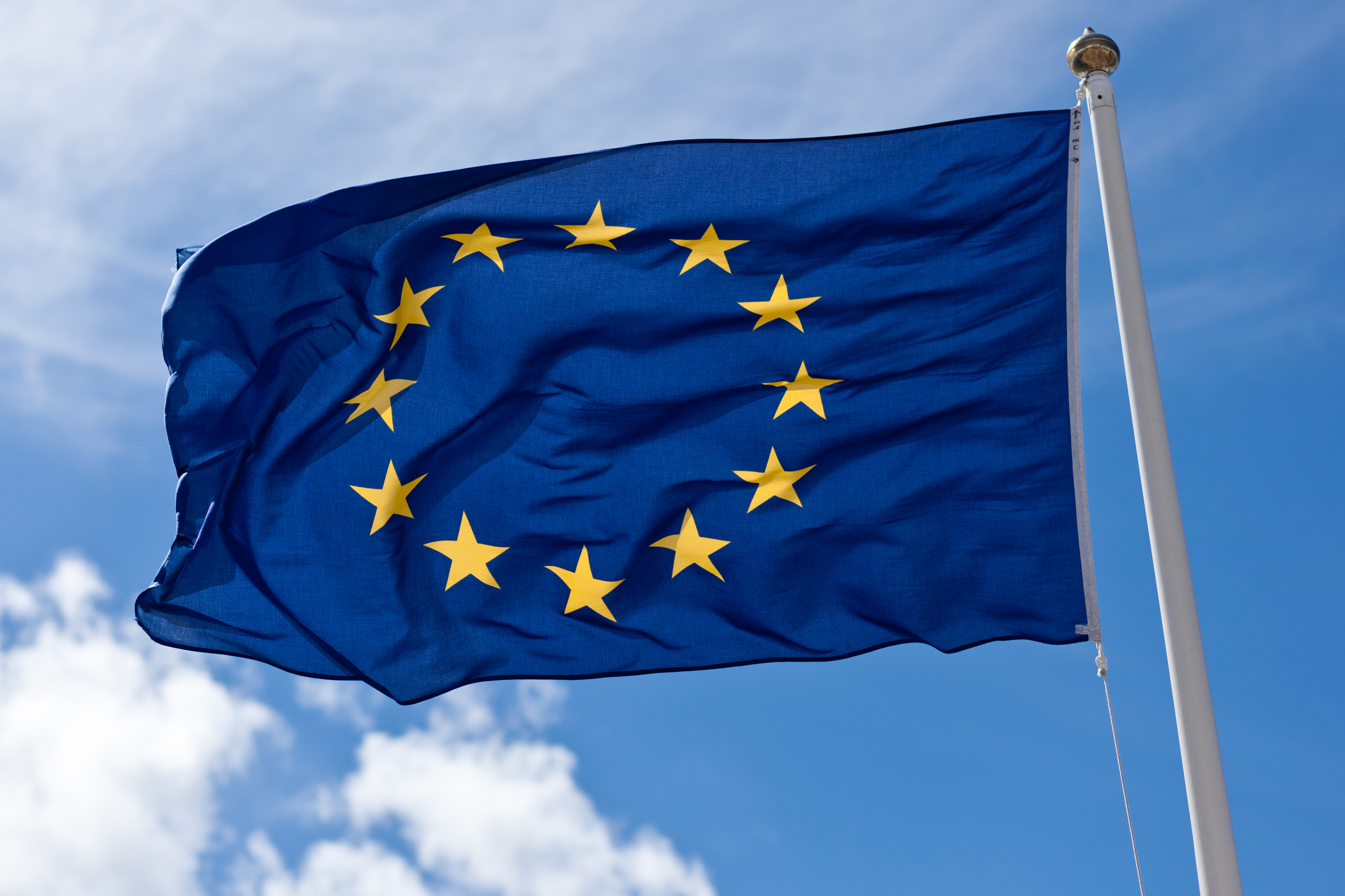
The European Union Flag

Denmark's ocean governance has historically been shaped by international conventions and organizations. In 1996, United Nations Convention on the Law of the Sea (UNCLOS) defined the Exclusive Economic Zone (EEZ), which grants the sovereign state Denmark exclusive rights over marine resources, including "the production of energy from the water, currents and winds" up to 200 nautical miles from its coast. Today, the EU significantly shapes Denmark's environmental strategy, influencing both the legislative framework and implementation of policies related to the marine ecosystem. This interconnectedness is reflected in the fact that 1/3 of Denmark's laws in the environmental, climate, energy and building sectors are derived from EU directives.

In 2000, the EU adopted the Water Framework Directive (WFD) which established a structure for protecting and monitoring the aquatic environment. The WFD requires member states to develop river basin management plans and programs of management to reach good chemical and ecological status and prevent deterioration. The WFD was transposed into Danish legislation in 2013 through the Water Planning Act, mandating the regular update of river basin management plans every six years to enhance the country's marine environment. In 2008, The Marine Strategy Framework Directive (MSFD) was launched by the EU as a complement to the WFD. The MSFD was designed to augment the existing legislation that aims to safeguard marine environment and does not replicate existing legislation such as the WFD or the Common Fisheries Policies (CFP) or undermine regulations by the International Maritime Organization (IMO). It is explicitly stated that "existing institutional structures established in marine regions or subregions, in particular Regional Sea Conventions, should be used to ensure such coordination", which include conventions such as HELCOM, BARCOM and OSPAR.

The MSFD sets 11 qualitative descriptors for determining GES, ranging from biodiversity to marine litter and human-induced eutrophication. It requires member states like Denmark to develop marine strategies that include an initial assessment of the state of national marine waters, a definition of GES based on the descriptors, and the establishment of environmental targets. States must also put in place monitoring programs and take measures to maintain or achieve GES by the deadline. The MSFD is iterative, requiring cycles of assessments, revision and updates every six years to adapt to new environmental challenges and scientific insights. The MSFD incorporates a strong focus on public engagement and transparency in Article 19. It mandates that member states, including Denmark, shall publish their marine strategies, progress reports, and results to ensure public scrutiny and comment. The requirement for openness and inclusivity ensures that the protecting and managing of marine environment is not just a governmental or scientific endeavor. It is one that involves and informs the wider community, acknowledging the societal importance of healthy marine ecosystems.

== Danish Marine Strategy I (2012–2018) ==
Denmark initiated its marine governance with the implementation of its inaugural Marine Strategy I (2012–2018) in 2010, which included the transposing of the EU's MSFD into Danish legislation. The Marine Strategy aligns with the EUs MSFD as it also delineates 11 ocean descriptors to attain Good Environmental Status (GES). As a part of the Marine Strategy I, a socioeconomic analysis was executed, assessing the value derived from utilizing the marine environment evaluated against the costs associated with potential environmental decline. The assessment identifies fishery and raw material extraction as primary threats to Denmark's seabeds, while pinpointing shipping, offshore wind, oil, and gas activities as the biggest sources to pollutants. These are also the biggest commercial Danish sectors. Of the threats and pollutant sources identified, only fishery is explicitly mentioned in the legislative text for regulation in the Marine Strategy Act. The Marine Strategy has a significant focus on the preservation of marine biodiversity and the protection of aquatic organisms, which are mentioned several times throughout the legislative text and in the central section on the purpose and scope of application for the law. However, in the Marine Strategy I and associated legislation, Denmark aims to only safeguard those aspects of the marine environment for which it is already responsible under existing directives. The Danish Marine Strategy I garnered minimal media coverage, with only two articles appearing in major Danish newspapers in the period 2010–2013. Denmark never evaluated the environmental objectives' effectiveness from the Marine Strategy I. However, the country did update the strategy in 2019, resulting in the unveiling of the Marine Strategy II.

== Danish Marine Strategy II (2018–2024) ==
The Danish Marine Strategy II, spanning 2018–2024, builds on the initial strategy, incorporating an ecosystem approach to balance marine exploitation with environmental protection. The Strategy II upholds the 11 essential marine descriptors from Marine Strategy I and the MSFD to achieve GES. It includes an initial assessment of current marine conditions and sets 68 legally binding targets for improvement. The document details specific conditions and pressures within Danish marine areas, while highlighting the need for more knowledge and better monitoring methods to accurately assess environmental status and guide effective measures.

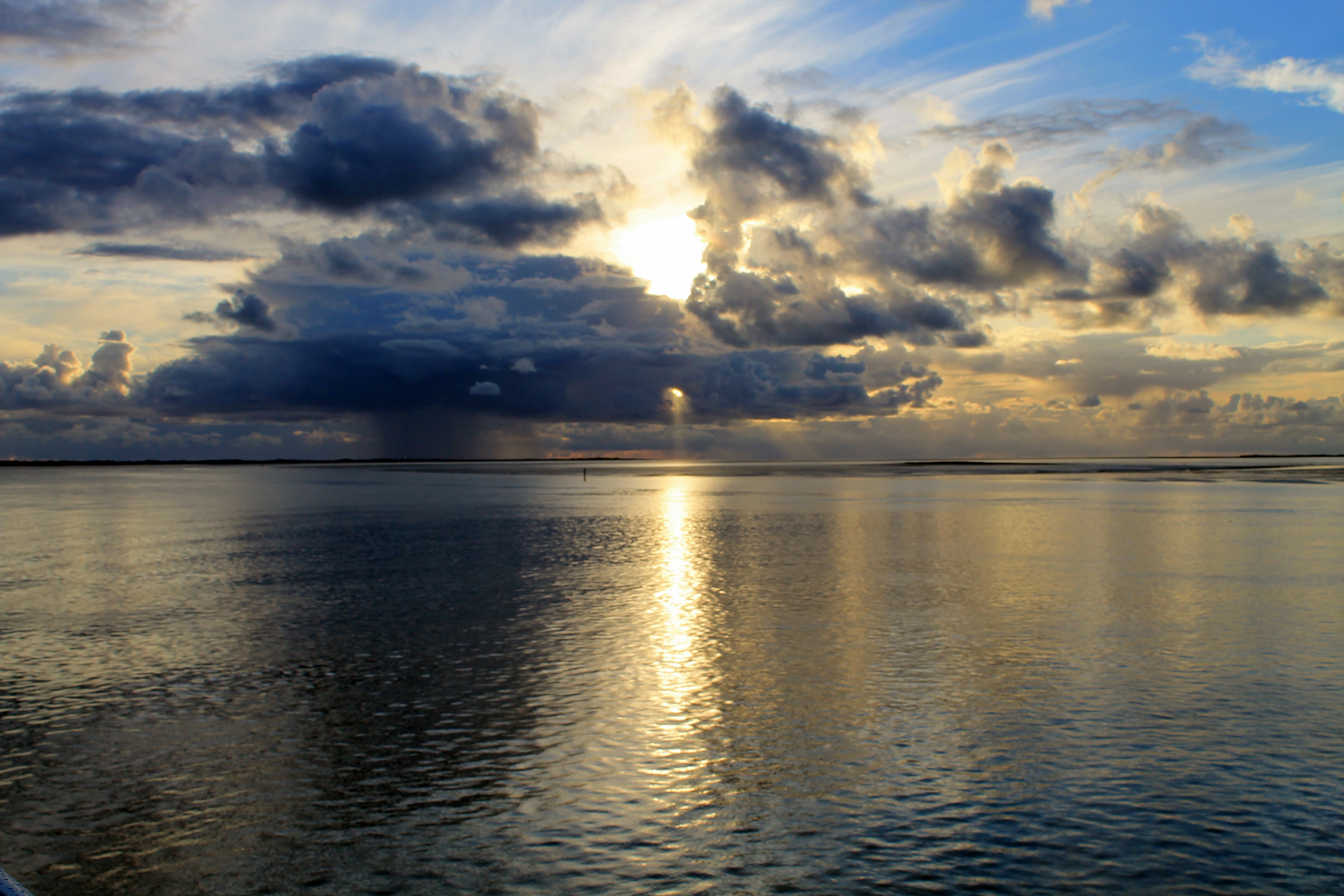
The waters off the south coast of Rømø

The Marine Strategy II acknowledges the persistent challenges in reaching the directive's objectives by 2020. The initial findings indicate the multiple aspects among the 11 environmental descriptors have not met the criteria for GES within Denmark's maritime areas. Its suggests that attaining GES for all marine aspects by 2020 is improbable, despite it being the overarching goal of the MSFD and the Danish Marine Strategy I. The comprehensive review across various subjects indicates that the most significant environmental impacts can be attributed to three primary factors: excessive nutrients, non-indigenous species and environmentally hazardous substances and the cumulative impacts of them. The Danish Marine Strategy II underscores the importance of collaborative efforts to enhance knowledge acquisition, with coordination occurring at both regional and EU levels. The solutions to the national challenges shall be found in cooperative frameworks such as OSPAR and HELCOM, as well as the informal EU collaboration surrounding the MSFD, all of which are expected to play a crucial role in the advancement of maritime governance in the forthcoming years. Denmark's Marine Strategy II has received significant media coverage, compared to the first strategy, with over 223 articles published across Danish media, indicating a heightened public scrutiny of marine environmental policies.

== The Marine Strategy Debate: Public and Political Responses ==
The Danish Marine Strategy II has been extensively covered by a broad range of media outlets, including major national newspapers, local news sources, and specialized environmental publications, reflecting a widespread public interest in Denmark's approach to marine environmental policy. The media, Altinget, a specialized Danish political news outlet, dedicated a series of articles under the title "Marine Strategy 2020-2026", delving into the dialogue and policy considerations of Denmark's Marine Strategy II. The strategy has prompted critical assessments from several environmental NGOs. The largest environmental NGO in Denmark, the Danish Society for Nature Conservation, has publicly expressed its concerns about the strategy, stating that it finds the situation: "extremely worrying, and [...] beyond all criticism". Furthermore, six environmental NGOs have lodged official consultation responses, collectively critiquing the strategy for what they view as inadequate oceanic environmental target setting and ineffective implementation mechanisms.

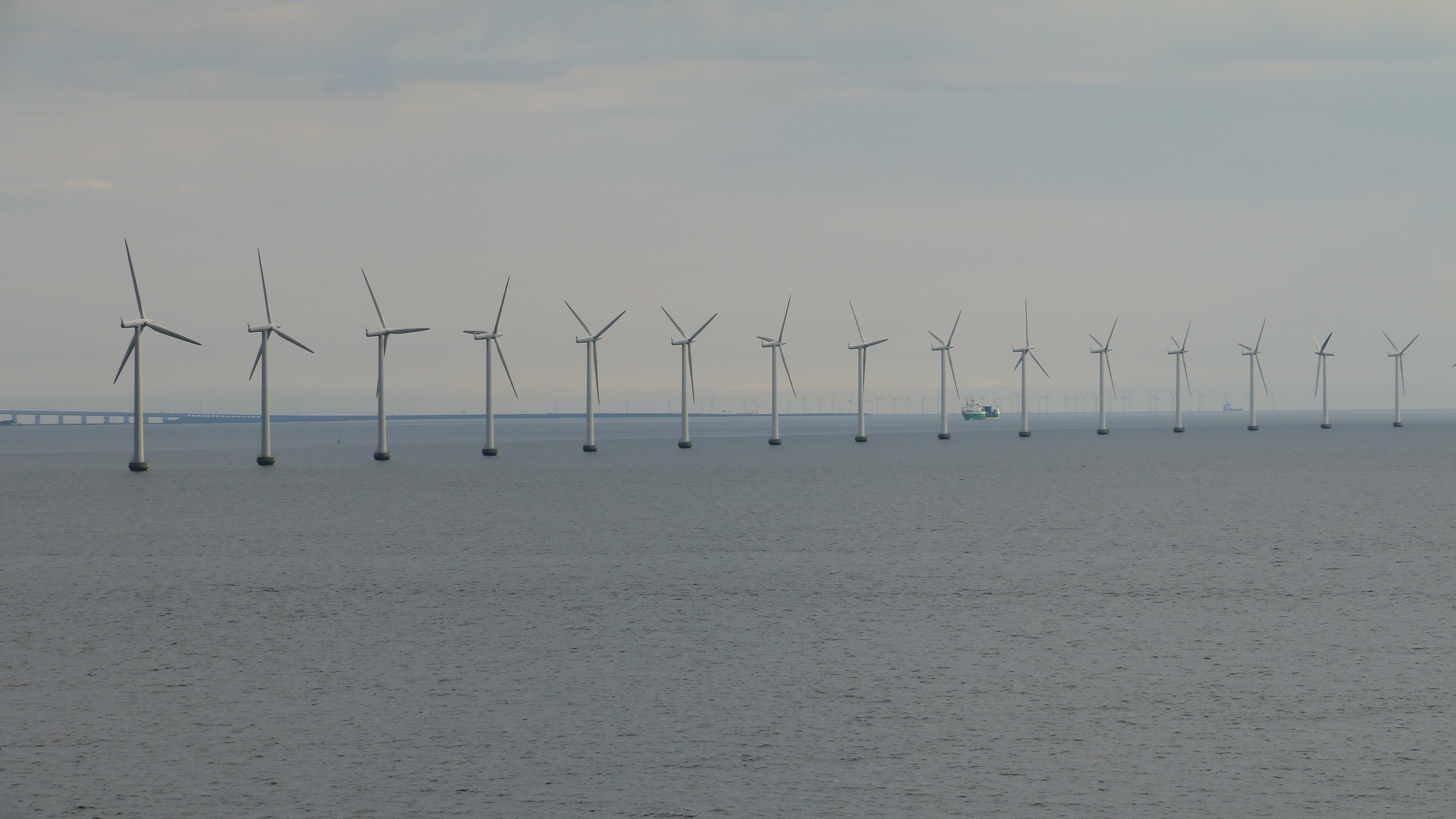
Wind farm outside of Copenhagen

The Danish Marine Strategy II has been met with considerable criticism from the scientific community. Marine biologist and aquarium director at the Øresund Aquarium under the University of Copenhagen, Jens Peder Jeppesen, has expressed significant criticism of the government's approach to marine conservation. He points out that the government's measures barely meet the EU's minimum requirements for marine protection and fail to address the necessary reforms in the bottom trawling practices. Jeppesen calls it "highly questionable that Denmark is not more ambitious than this". Concurrently, Jesper H. Andersen, a research chief at the Niva research institute, has offered a similarly stark critique of the plan, describing it as: "the worst [he has] ever seen.". He underscores the plan's failure to integrate cumulative effects in designated areas, such as those from wind farms, raw material zones, or fisheries. Additionally, it does not consider the existing negative impacts from land-based activities, particularly agriculture, which he finds is the biggest "pressure factor" to the Danish ocean environment.

While green organizations and scientists have labeled the strategy as unambitious, business interests, particularly within the fishing industry, express concerns that the strategy overemphasizes the impact of fishing activities. Representatives from the sector argues that the strategy could lead to "overregulation of fishing" while underaddressing the environmental impacts of agriculture and shipping. Brian Thorsen, director of Danish Aquaculture, has advocated for a balanced approach that weights the economic dependence on a healthy and sustainable marine environment against the perceived impact of the fishing industry on the seabed. Instead, he calls for more attention on improving Denmark's use of marine resources for food production.

The Danish Marine Strategy II has also faced criticism from political parties such as Danish People's Party (DF) and the Green Left (SF). Lars Vestergaard (DF) has pointed out that the Marine Strategy II "leaves one with the impression that the sea is merely there for human exploitation". He advocates for substantial areas of the ocean to be free from industrial exploitation to protect diverse marine life. Trine Torp (SF) warns that the strategy risks the future marine environment and socioeconomic benefits to protect businesses today. Torp argues that the ocean possesses an invauable worth in its unique natural state, which is crucial because of its intrinsic value, but also for providing resources as sand and fish. She emphasized that a clean sea and pristine coastal nature are essential for everyone in Denmark, highlighting the inherent value of the oceans beyond utilitarian purposes.

In defense for the Marine Strategy II, Venstre's environmental spokesperson Erling Bonnesen argues for a balance between environmental quality and fishing industry needs, suggesting the strategy achieves this.Bonnesen further contends that the marine strategy not only meets the current needs but also lays the groundwork for Denmark's future marine policy. Similarly, the Danish Minister of Industry, Morten Bødskov, insists that the new marine strategy is ecosystem-based and stands as "a historical green agreement". He rejects the criticism and advocate that the strategy is a proactive step towards meeting both national and international environmental obligations.

=== The Danish Hypoxia Scandal ===
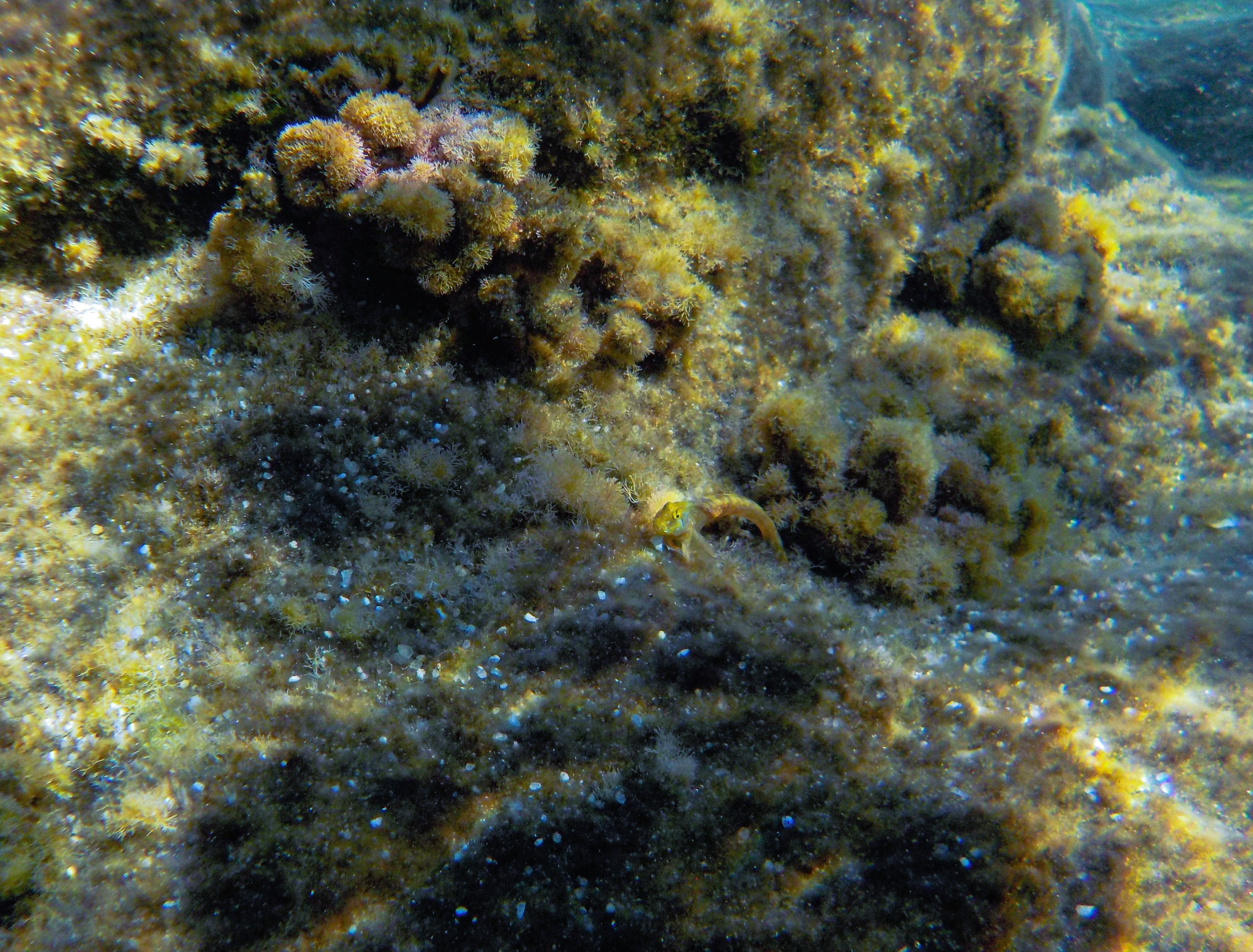
Seabed with quartz grains among the granite rocks

A particularly salient issue that has garnered media and public attention in the context of Denmark's Marine Strategy is the matter of hypoxia in Danish coastal water. This heightened focus comes in the wake of the Danish Centre for Environment and Energy's latest hypoxia report, which brought the issue to the forefront of environmental concerns. The findings of the report revealed that despite the ongoing mitigation efforts outlined in both the Marine Strategy I and II, there had been a significant escalation in hypoxia levels. This marked the most severe levels observed in 20 years. The topic of hypoxia has seen a surge in media coverage in Denmark, with 2124 articles reported since the release of the report in September, highlighting growing awareness and salience in the public. Where the implementation and launch of the Marine Strategy I and II have received little citizen engagement, public engagement has been vocal and visible on the issue of hypoxia. This was evident during the event "Danmark holder vejret" (English: "Denmark holds its Breath"), organized by prominent Danish NGOs, such as Danish Society for Nature Conservation, Danish Anglers Association and more. This nationwide demonstration on October 29, 2023, aimed to draw attention to the plight of marine life and to lobby for governmental action on environmental issues. Participants showed solidarity with affected marine species by holding their breath for 30 seconds, a symbolic act that gained traction on social media with the hastag #Danmarkholdervejret, amplifying the call for urgent environmental measures.

The Minister of Environment, Magnus Heunicke, calls the situation "alarming" and acknowledges that the government has been asleep at the wheel. A researcher at the Institute for Ecoscience, Stiig Markager, warned about the hypoxia levels in Danish coastal waters 20 years ago. According to him, the problem has grown over the last decade due to failed policies. He points to the fact that politicians have been aware of the problem since the 1980s and "have not managed to effectively address it". The Danish Think Tank, Ocean Institute, concurs and adds that nitrogen discharge is to blame for the hypoxia levels and significant risk to marine ecosystems. Concurrently, Rigsrevisionen (The National Audit Office) has leveled criticism at the governmental oversight of marine health, noting a discrepancy with the EUs 2027 goals in the Water Framework Directive. This has prompted a call for thorough review of the Ministry of Food, Agriculture and Fisheries as well as the Ministry of the Environment's regulation and handling of nitrogen monitoring.

== See also ==
- Marine Strategy Framework Directive
- Water Framework Directive
- Hypoxia
- Good Environmental Status
- River Basin Management Plans
- Eutrophication
