= Nature Restoration Law =

Regulation of the European Union

Regulation 2024/1991
- European Union regulation
- Text with EEA relevance
- Title: Nature Restoration Law
- Made by: European Parliament and the Council
- Journal reference: OJ L, 2024/1991, 29.7.2024

History
- Entry into force: 18 August 2024

Other legislation
- Amends: Regulation (EU) 2022/869

The Nature Restoration Law is a regulation (Regulation (EU) 2024/1991) of the European Union to protect the EU environments and restore its nature to a good ecological state through renaturation. The law is a core element of the European Green Deal and the EU Biodiversity Strategy and makes the targets set therein for the "restoration of nature" binding. EU member states will have to develop their national restoration plans by 2026. They will have to restore at least 30% of habitats in poor condition by 2030, 60% by 2040, and 90% by 2050.

The regulation is a response to Europe's declining natural environments, with more than 80% of habitats in poor condition. Its goals include protecting the functioning of ecosystem services, climate change mitigation, resilience and autonomy by preventing natural disasters and reducing risks to food security, and restoring damaged ecosystems.

The regulation was proposed by the European Commission on 22 June 2022. The law was adopted in the Council of the European Union on 17 June 2024 and was published in the EU's Official Journal on 29 July 2024, thus coming into force on 18 August 2024 (20th day after publication).

== History ==
After the Council of the European Union agreed on a revised proposal in June 2023, the trilogue negotiations between the commission, Council and EU Parliament began. On 12 July, after many debates, the Parliament voted in favor. An agreement on a compromise was reached by the European Parliament and the Council on 9 November 2023. The EU Parliament voted in favor of the final draft law on 27 February 2024.

Before the vote in the Council of the EU with the environment ministers, which was initially scheduled for 25 March 2024, the representatives of eight EU member states withdrew their consent: Sweden, Italy, the Netherlands and Hungary were now against it, while Austria, Belgium, Finland, and Poland announced their abstention. The vote was then taken off the agenda. After Austria controversially announced its approval, the vote took place in the Council on 17 June 2024, and the law was adopted.

The Austrian environment minister Leonore Gewessler played a pivotal role in its final passage in the Council of the EU. Despite significant opposition and political controversy, she announced her support for the law in June, citing her inability to reconcile letting the opportunity pass without having tried everything. This decision, however, placed her in a contentious legal grey area due to opposition from Austria's federal states and her coalition partners, the centre-right Austrian People's Party (ÖVP). Gewessler had previously been unable to support the law due to unanimous opposition from Austria's nine states, but Vienna and Carinthia withdrew opposition following changes to the proposed law without explicitly shifting the unanimous stance. With the law's passage in the Council, it will come into force 20 days after publication in the Official Journal of the EU.

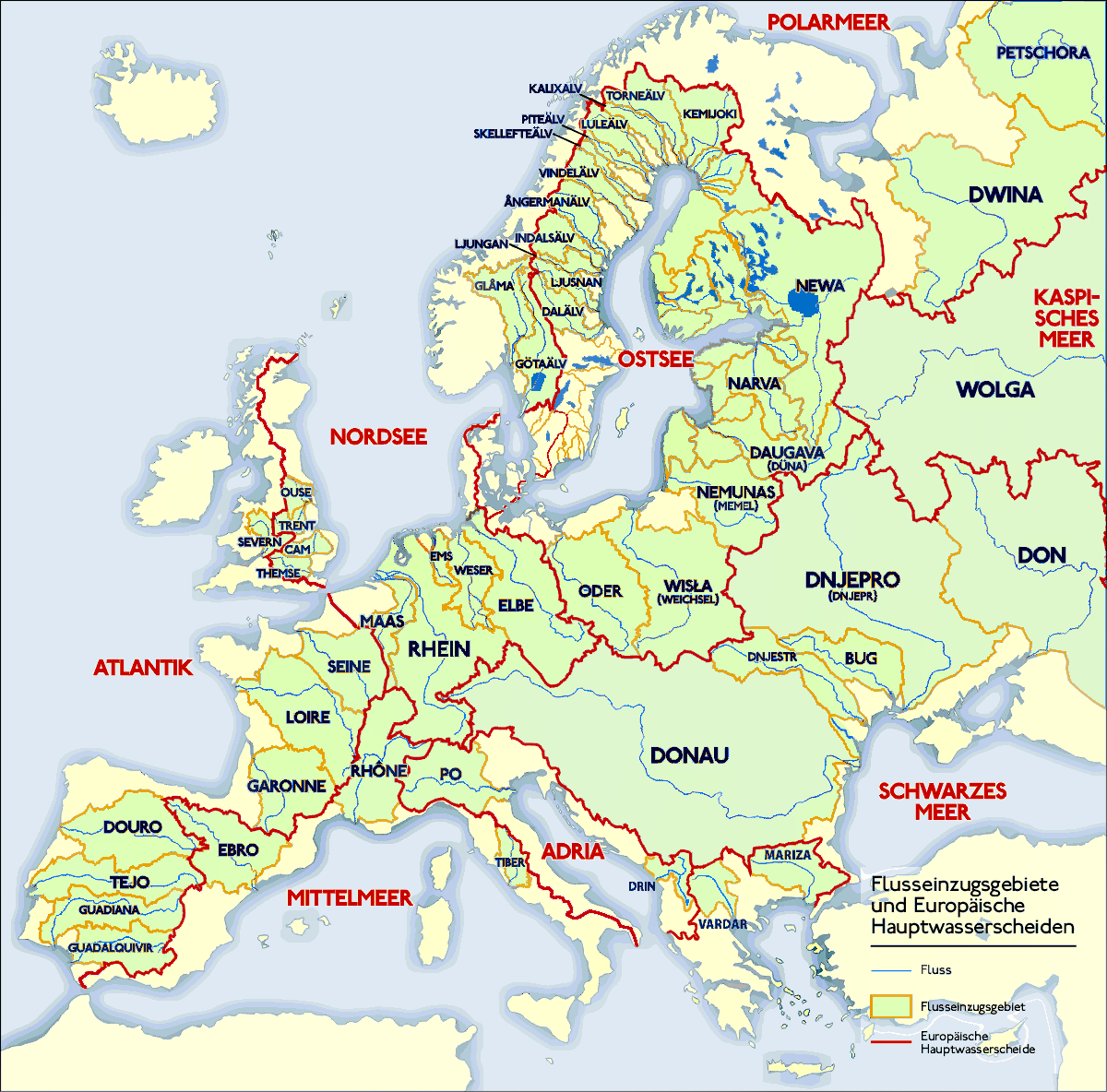
A map of main rivers in Europe

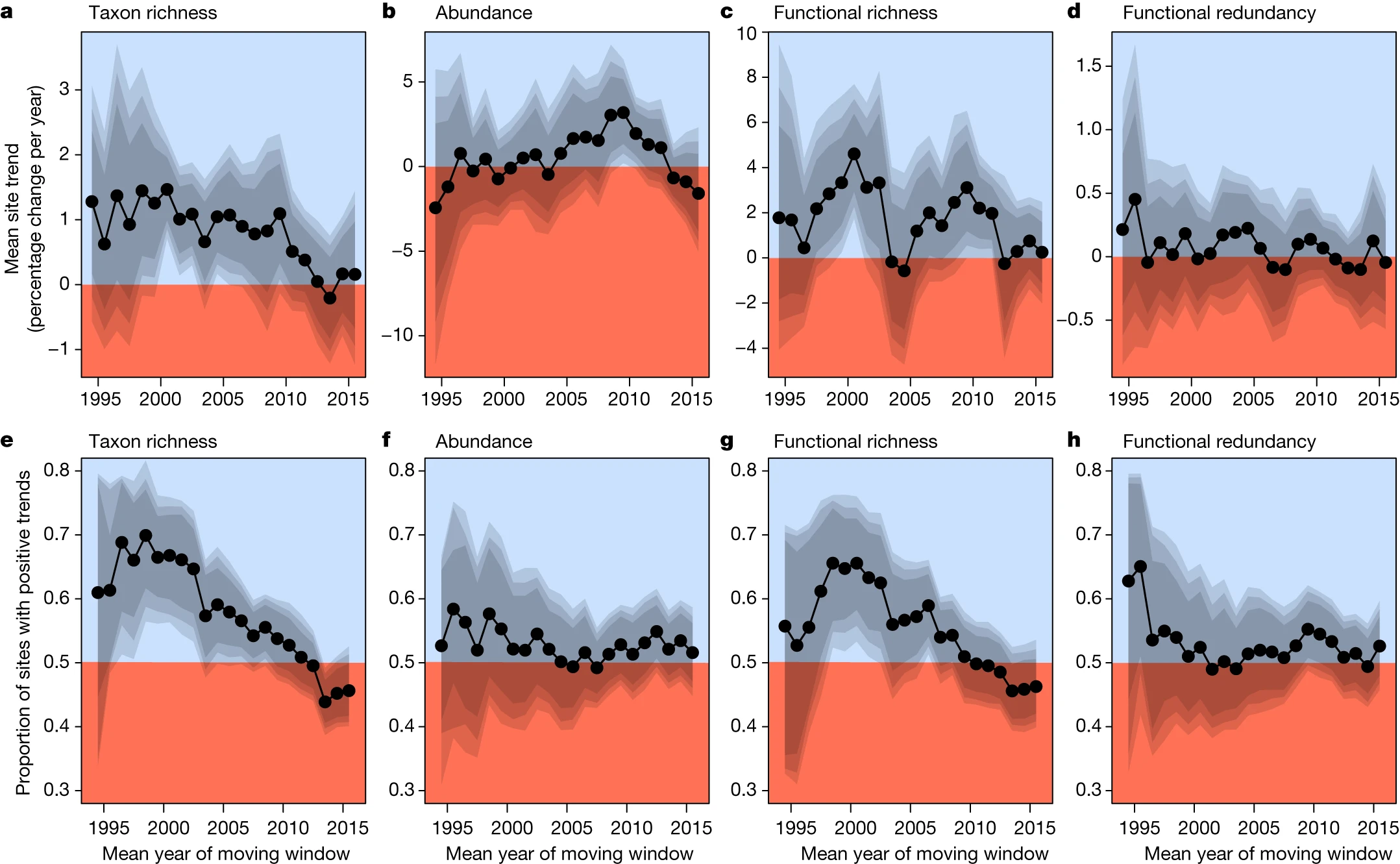
An assessment of European freshwater biodiversity recovery and declines

The final text reduced requirements for the farming sector.

=== Voting result in the European Parliament on 27 February 2024 ===
The European Parliament adopted the agreement reached with the Member States by 329 votes to 275, with 24 abstentions. The individual political groups in the European Parliament voted like so:

Party	Pro (votes)	Con (votes)	Abstentions
ECR	3	60	1
EPP	25	115	10
Greens/EFA	69	—	2
ID	—	50	—
The Left	28	3	—
Renew Europe	60	30	6
S&D	117	4	3
Non-attached	27	13	2

== Reception ==
The regulation was endorsed by the International Union for Conservation of Nature, scientists, who wrote an open letter in support that addressed critics' arguments, and the European Academies Science Advisory Council among others.

Two organizations that represent the farming and fisheries sectors have criticized the policy as an unimplementable legislation in 2023 that endangers farmers' and fishers' livelihoods. In another open letter by academics, biodiversity researchers requested policies like the Nature Restoration Law are built alongside farmers to empower them to make agriculture more environmentally friendly.

In July 2023, European People's Party (EPP) leader Manfred Weber tried to block the Nature Restoration Law, saying it would destroy farmers' livelihoods and threaten food security.

In October 2024, the European Ombudsman attested maladministration in the EU Commission's Directorate-General for Environment. Previously, the DG refused to disclose documents containing information in the lobbying activities of environmentalist NGOs during the draft of the Nature Restoration Law.

== See also ==
- 2024 in politics
- 2024 in the European Union
- Biodiversity
- Ecosystem health
- Ecological assessment
- Sustainable food system
- Water Framework Directive
