= Marine Strategy Framework Directive =

Directive 2008/56/EC
- European Union directive
- Title: Marine Strategy Framework Directive
- Made by: European Parliament & Council
- Made under: Article 175(1)
- Journal reference: OJ L 164, 25.6.2008, p. 19–40

History
- Date made: 17 June 2008
- Entry into force: 15 July 2008
- Implementation date: 15 July 2010

Other legislation
- Amended by: Commission Directive (EU) 2017/845

The Marine Strategy Framework Directive (MSFD; full title: Directive 2008/56/EC of the European Parliament and of the Council of 17 June 2008 establishing a framework for community action in the field of marine environmental policy) is a European Directive originally aimed at achieving or maintaining Good Environmental Status (GES) in European marine regions and sub-regions by the year 2020 for 11 descriptors. These descriptors include: D1 Biodiversity, D2 Non-indigenous species, D3 Commercial fish and shellfish, D4 Food webs, D5 Eutrophication, D6 Seafloor integrity, D7 Hydrographic conditions, D8 Environmental contaminants, D9 Contaminants in seafood, D10 Marine Litter, and D11 Introduction of energy, including noise.

The objective of Good Environmental Status had not been achieved by 2020 in all EU waters across all GES descriptors.

== Overview ==
The Marine Strategy Framework Directive (MSFD) is a framework directive, and this means that there are no specific targets and measures defined within the directive itself. The EU Member States therefore have a significant role in operationalising the goal of achieving or maintaining Good Environmental Status in the marine environment by the year 2020. They do so by developing their own marine strategies that must be implemented to protect or restore marine environments, as well as, reducing and preventing inputs to the marine environment to phase out pollution. The Directive is motivated by the fact that marine environments have been adversely affected by increasing human pressures in recent decades, as coastal and marine activities have expanded.

The scope of the directive applies to Member States' sovereignty and jurisdiction over the Baltic Sea, the North-east Atlantic Ocean (composed of the Greater North Sea, including the Kattegat and the English Channel, the Celtic Seas, the Bay of Biscay, the Iberian Coast, and the Macaronesian biogeographic region), the Mediterranean Sea (composed of the Western Mediterranean Sea, the Adriatic Sea, the Ionian Sea, the Central Mediterranean Sea, and the Aegean-Levantine Sea) and the Black Sea, with various subdivisions defined. Member States sharing marine regions are required to cooperate so as to have coherent strategies across regions. The cooperation and thus the implementation of the MSFD is reliant on already existing regional cooperation structures such as the Regional Seas Conventions (RSCs). The number of these RSCs correspond to the four European marine regions that the MSFD prescribed for the purpose of management, listed above. The corresponding RSCs are the Helsinki Convention (for the Baltic Sea), the OSPAR Convention (for the North-East Atlantic), the Barcelona Convention (for the Mediterranean), and the Bucharest Convention (for the Black Sea).

Besides policy cooperation taking place at regional level, policy coordination takes place at EU level to ensure consistency between the objectives of the MSFD and other directives, regulations and policies. The MSFD indeed has synergies with other EU policies such as the Water Framework Directive, the Habitats and Birds Directives, the Common Fisheries Policy, and Integrated Coastal Zone Management, which had to be considered in the development and planning of the Directive. More recent synergistic policies include the Single-Use plastics Directive, the EU Plastics Strategy, and the Ship-source pollution Directive to name a few. The MSFD is thus intended to integrate rather than replace related environmental legislation.

== The Environmental Pillar of EU Maritime Governance ==
Considered one of the most ambitious instruments of marine governance worldwide, the MSFD is anchored in the EU's Integrated Maritime Policy (IMP), which also comprises the Maritime Spatial Planning Directive (MSPD). The MSPD taps into a global maritime spatial planning movement, and is considered the 'Blue Growth Directive', as it requires Member States to pursue blue growth while ensuring GES. Blue growth is tied to the ocean politics paradigm of 'blue economy', which recognises the ocean as a new economic frontier and links economic growth with principles of sustainable development and environmental protection.

The MSFD is considered the 'environmental directive', as it governs the environmental aspects of the blue economy under EU law. It also aims to protect the European marine environment and to ensure that natural resources are exploited sustainably, so biodiversity is maintained or achieved. The MSFD establishes criteria for this sustainable exploitation of natural resources based on the precautionary principle to prevent irreversible changes. Besides, the Directive also aims to ensure clean, healthy and productive regional seas. The MSFD thus links ocean health to human-induced pressures to guide marine management. Therefore, the MSFD also represents the paradigm of 'ocean health', which implies thinking of the oceans as 'a sick patient', requiring scientifically formed interventions to restore its well-being.

The legal text of the MSFD is composed of three parts. The first is a Preamble, which lays out the broad guidelines of the Directive. Amongst other things, it is here described that the Directive constitutes an important cornerstone of the EU's future maritime policy and that the Directive aims to promote the integration of environmental considerations in all relevant policy areas. Here, an exemption regime is also included whereby states can justify not achieving GES or the environmental targets. The second part of the Directive is the operative part, and this is divided into five chapters. The third and final part is composed of six annexes, which provide standards and guidance to Member States as they are addressing the operative part. The most central here is probably Annex 1, as this is about the qualitative descriptors that Member States must determine the characteristics of GES upon.

The Directive was updated in 2017. In 2017, the Commission also laid down assessment criteria and methodologies for defining GES for each descriptor to ensure coherence of definitions of GES between Member States, thereby narrowing their margin of discretion in defining GES.

=== Descriptors ===
The 11 qualitative descriptors of the MSFD are listed in the third part of the Directive in Annex I and describe the desired state of the environment. The descriptors address the main characteristics, impacts and pressures in marine ecosystems. They can either refer to a state, such as D1 Biodiversity, or a pressure, such as D8 Environmental contaminants. The MSFD included more novel descriptors in the Directive such as D10 Marine Litter and D11 Introduction of energy, including noise, to encompass new and emerging pressures, which are not explicitly addressed by other policies. For instance, D3 Commercial Fish and Shellfish and D5 Eutrophication were already steered by the Common Fisheries Policy and the Water Framework Directive, respectively. By encompassing new pressures such as underwater noise in D11 and marine litter, including microplastics in D10, the EU has been a global frontrunner: The MSFD formally defines underwater noise as a pollutant and represents the first instance that microplastics in the marine environment have been included in a legislative act.

== Main Actors and Stakeholders ==
The main actors in the MSFD are the policy-making entities in the governments of the national Member States, as they are the ones responsible for developing marine strategies as well as achieving and maintaining GES. The Regional Seas Conventions do, however, also play a major role in coordinating these strategies. Besides, EU institutions are also central actors. These include the European Commission that play a role in guidance, oversight, and coordination, as it is responsible for the analysis of submitted Member State assessments, which are evaluated for their adequacy, completeness and coherence. Other relevant EU institutions include the European Environment Agency that stores and makes available monitoring reports. The MSFD Common Implementation Strategy also coordinates the policy implementation and guides, supervises, and evaluates the process.

As regards stakeholders, different public, private and third sector organisations who have a vested interest in marine waters are worthy of mention. Survey results have found that environmental NGOs have a significantly higher preference for being involved in decision-making processes to achieve GES as compared to other private stakeholders. Private energy firms have been active in consultation processes and have participated in some working groups, and the dredging and renewable energy industries have also sought influence along with the tourism industry with a link to marine waters. Some scholars argue, however, that the MSFD lacks coherency and detail with respect to stakeholder involvement, and that it can be difficult for policymakers to identify when and how to engage stakeholders in the implementation of the MSFD.

== Background ==
Prior to 2008, the European Union had a laissez-faire approach to the regulation and management of the marine environment, resources and ecology. Maritime disputes between Member States would often result in arbitration proceedings, such as the MOX Plant Case (Ireland v. United Kingdom) of October 2001.

In 2001, 90% of oil trade with the EU was seaborne and almost 70% of imports passed the shores of Brittany and the English Channel. To minimize risk of polluting shipping disasters, the European Commission recommended maritime safety measures such as phasing out single-hull tankers, and creating a European Maritime Safety Agency. Following the major oil spills of MV Erika in 1999 and MV Prestige in 2002, the European Commission recommended the adoption of international maritime rules in April 2002, notably those of the IMO, of which the EU has never been a full member.

On 22 July 2002, the European Commission's Sixth Community Environment Action Programme (6th EAP) was defined to set European environmental policy up to 2010.

In October 2002, the European Commission reported that there was no integrated policy in existing EU policies and legislation to protect the marine environment, and proposed a strategy to promote sustainable use of the seas and oceans as well as conservation of global marine ecosystems. The resultant strategy outlined in October 2005 defined a dual EU and regional approach; common co-operation among Member States and third countries bordering EU waters, but planning and execution of measures taken at regional levels due to diversity of conditions, problems and needs of each marine region. Additionally, it concluded that a binding legal commitment was required from Member States to ensure adequate levels of protection from each state. As such, an EU Directive was chosen as the legal instrument for the strategy.

=== Creating the MSFD - The Legislative Process ===
Now constituting a major part of the EU environmental legislation, the Marine Strategy Framework Directive was ratified on 17 June 2008 by the European Council with the unanimity of all 27 (at the time) Member States. It was then published on 25 June 2008 and came into force 20 days later, on 15 July 2008, reflecting an increasingly active role of the EU in marine governance.

The European Commission's Directorate-General for the Environment (DG ENV) developed and planned the drafting of the Directive. In accordance with the Ordinary Legislative Procedure of the European Union, the Commission proposed the Directive, which was then modified and subsequently adopted by the European Parliament and the Council.

Before the adoption of the Directive, the European Commission's preparatory work emphasised the need for effective ocean use management to address problems such as marine pollution, overexploitation of resources, and the need to protect biodiversity in a comprehensive manner. To meet the latter need, the MSFD takes an integrated, holistic and cross-sectoral approach to managing ecosystems and human activities – a so-called 'ecosystem approach' or 'ecosystem-based management (EBM) approach'.

== The Ecosystem Approach ==
The OSPAR Convention of 1992 defined the ecosystem approach as a "comprehensive integrated management of human activities based on the best available scientific knowledge about the ecosystem and its dynamics, in order to identify and take action on influences which are critical to the health of marine ecosystems". Since the MSFD adopts an ecosystem approach, which is inherently part of an 'integrated management approach', it is arguable that the MSFD itself embodies this integrated management approach. As opposed to the traditional law of the sea, i.e. the 'zonal approach', the integrated management approach, is cross-sectoral and holistic in nature – as the MSFD.

The MSFD can also be understood as part of a broader shift towards managing ocean spaces through proclamations that emphasise regulated access of ocean spaces and resources, comprising the oceans policy issue. This shift reflects a certain departure from the traditional principle of freedom of the seas, which posits that the oceans and their resources belong to all in common, as overexploitation has shown that this is unsustainable, and that oceans are vulnerable to the tragedy of the commons. Instead, the Directive embodies a 'stewardship norm', where oceans are susceptible to social intervention in the pursuit of a specific goal, i.e. GES.

The ecosystem approach is intended to serve as a corrective to management failures that were associated with earlier sectoral policies taken on a compartmentalised basis. Further, there has been a realisation that integrated policies, which enables coordinated governance of human activities and conservation, are required to address conflicts between the use and conservation of the seas rather than sectoral approaches. The fact that the MSFD rests on an ecosystem approach – and thereby takes a systems perspective – distinguishes the Directive from most other environmental policies in the EU, as they are sectoral in scope. Besides, environmental directives have traditionally been prescriptive, enshrining a command-and-controls style of regulation, and here the MSFD also differs due to the framework nature of the Directive.

== The Framework Nature of the Directive - The Principle of Subsidiarity ==
The term 'Framework' in the title of the MSFD reflects the EU's principle of subsidiarity, which states that decisions should be taken as close to the people as possible, as per Article 5 of the Lisbon Treaty. Therefore, the Member States have discretion to determine with which policy instruments they will achieve the overarching goal of GES, which applies to all Member States. The MSFD is thus a goal-oriented directive. In implementing the MSFD, however, the Member States do not have full discretion as regards choosing by which means they will manage pressures on the marine environment and thereby achieve the goal of GES, as they are constrained by other international, EU and national legislation. For instance, the fact that MSFD relies on the Regional Seas Conventions in its implementation means that some of the means for achieving GES derive from them. Some scholars argue that this means that operative conditions, rules and standards for different sectors are not regulated in an integrated manner, but rather in sectoral legislation that is not holistic, and which does not consider marine protection interests enough. Where action by individual Member States is insufficient, the MSFD also recognises that measures must be taken at regional or community level.

By contrast to prescriptive regulations, a framework directive contains mostly procedural obligations rather than substantive requirements, i.e. the means for and substantive rules governing the implementation of its objectives. In the context of the MSFD, there is, however, one substantive requirement in the form of achieving and maintaining GES, which is at the core of the Directive.

== Good Environmental Status ==
Good Environmental Status is a qualitative description of the state of the seas that the framework directive required its member states to achieve or maintain by the year 2020. Good Environmental Status is described by 11 Descriptors:

- Descriptor 1. Biodiversity is maintained
- Descriptor 2. Non-indigenous species do not adversely alter the ecosystem
- Descriptor 3. The population of commercial fish species is healthy
- Descriptor 4. Elements of food webs ensure long-term abundance and reproduction
- Descriptor 5. Eutrophication is minimised
- Descriptor 6. The sea floor integrity ensures functioning of the ecosystem
- Descriptor 7. Permanent alteration of hydrographical conditions does not adversely affect the ecosystem
- Descriptor 8. Concentrations of contaminants give no effects
- Descriptor 9. Contaminants in seafood are below safe levels
- Descriptor 10. Marine litter does not cause harm
- Descriptor 11. Introduction of energy (including underwater noise) does not adversely affect the ecosystem

== Achieving Good Environmental Status (GES) - A Cyclical Process ==
For the Member States, the procedural obligations of the Directive consist in timely adoption and reporting of assessments, programmes, and strategies. The implementation of the Directive spans several processes – all with the aim of achieving or maintaining GES, "which Member States shall take the necessary measures" towards. GES is defined as: "the environmental status of marine waters where these provide ecologically diverse and dynamic oceans and seas which are clean, healthy and productive within their intrinsic conditions, and the use of the marine environment is at a level that is sustainable, thus safeguarding the potential for uses and activities by current and future generations". Further, GES is assessed by the measurement of indicators.

The first implementation cycle ran from 2012 to 2016, and during these years, Member States had to take six procedural steps to develop a marine strategy for their waters. Firstly, by late 2012, Member States should provide an initial assessment of European waters for the 11 descriptors to identify pressures and impacts. Secondly, in 2012, they also had to determine Good Environmental Status for their respective waters in coordination with neighbouring countries of the same region and establish environmental targets. These environmental targets are operational goals that guide the progress toward GES, as they define thresholds and reduction targets for different pressures. Thirdly, by 2014, Member States had to develop monitoring programmes for ongoing assessment and updating of targets. Several Member States, however, missed this deadline. Fifthly, by 2016, the Member States had to develop programmes of measures (PoMs), which are explicit measures to achieve or maintain GES. Sixthly, these programmes of measures were implemented. Coordination is particularly important to the development and implementation of these programmes of measures, and there is significant financial investment related to implementing these programmes of measures as well as carrying monitoring programmes.

Every six years, Member States update their monitoring reports, and this allows them to fill potential knowledge gaps, to determine GES, and to provide the data which makes it possible to classify a marine area as reaching or failing to obtain GES. The conceptualisation of GES is thus a continuing process because of changes in ecosystems, new scientific knowledge and development of new technological capabilities. Member States can also modify their marine strategies and programmes of measures. All things considered, marine management is a long-term, cyclic and ongoing process.

=== Programmes of Measures ===
Before any new programmes of measures to reach GES are implemented, these must be assessed by examining their cost-effectiveness (CEA) and by carrying out cost-benefit analyses (CBA) to estimate the benefits and costs associated with implementing a particular programme of measure. There are several challenges associated with this, as it is inherently complex to quantify the benefits of marine ecosystem goods and services such as food, energy, recreation, aesthetics, storm and flood protection, and biodiversity. The first reason for this is that marine ecosystem goods and services are much less tangible than terrestrial ecosystem services. Those ecosystem goods and services that are created in a marine environment are indeed not traded on markets, and therefore prices as an indicator for value do not exist. The second reason is that it is difficult to trace how a change in the marine environment such as less marine litter will lead to a change in the provisioning of ecosystem goods and services, which affects benefits for humans. The third and final reason relates to the fact that European seas are trans-boundary in nature, which might result in the negligence of benefits that occur outside national territories. Considering these three factors means that a cost-benefit analysis of implementing a programme of measure might underestimate the benefits of reducing pressure on the marine environment relatively to the related costs of doing so. The implication of this challenge in valuing marine ecosystem goods and services can thus be that the environmental effectiveness of the MSFD might be hampered, and that GES might not be achieved, because the costs of implementing a programme of measure are relatively overestimated.

Besides examining the cost-effectiveness and carrying out cost-benefit analyses of programmes of measures, the MSFD has three other key economic requirements. These include: i) carrying out economic and social analyses (ESA) of the use of marine waters and examining the cost of degradation of the marine environment, ii) considering social and economic concerns in the establishment of environmental targets, and iii) justify potential exceptions to implement measures to reach GES based on disproportionate costs of measures.

=== Marine Strategies ===
Marine strategies are the sum of the procedural steps that Member States are legally bound by. These are understood as instruments which must be adapted continuously rather than as instruments that are permanently fixed. Member States review the strategies every six years by re-examining earlier assessments, GES, environmental targets, monitoring programmes, and their adopted programmes of measures. According to Article 1.3 of the MSFD, the aim of the strategies is to protect marine ecosystems from anthropogenic pressures, but nonetheless they still allow for sustainable use of marine goods and services by present and future generations.

Although each Member State is responsible for developing a marine strategy for application in and specific to their own marine waters, the national strategy must consider the needs of the marine regions or subregions of which the Member State is part and contribute to GES at both the subregional, regional, and national levels. Member States sharing a marine region or subregion must thus make sure that the adopted measures are "coherent and coordinated across the marine region or subregion concerned".

Economic considerations are central for developing the marine strategies, as cost-effectiveness analyses (CEA) and cost-benefit analyses (CBA) are required before implementing programmes of measures, but also in justifying exemptions for reaching GES. "Where there is no significant risk to the marine environment, or where the costs would be disproportionate taking account of the risks to the marine environment", Member States are indeed not obligated to take steps towards GES.

=== Regional Seas Conventions ===
According to Article 13 of the MSFD, "Member States are required to cooperate to ensure the coordinated development of marine strategies for each marine region or subregion" and to ensure coherence. To ensure coordination and coherence, the Regional Seas Conventions (RSCs) should be used "where practical and appropriate". The RSCs have existed since the 1970s and are established under the United Nations Environment Programme (UNEP). The coordination through the RSCs suggests that Member States adopt a wider spatial scale of implementation that goes beyond their national jurisdictions. Indeed, the concept of 'region' is not defined by political factors but by consideration of hydrological, oceanographic and biogeographic features, making the concept ecological in nature, tying in with the ecosystem-based approach. Under the RSCs, contracting states are obligated to manage pressure on the marine environment and improve the state of the (sub)regional seas. However, the MSFD is an independent legal instrument that steers marine policies specifically in the Member States of the EU. This means that non-Member States do not need to cooperate or adhere to management measures introduced under the MSFD to achieve GES. This can make it difficult to achieve GES in regions, where there are many non-Member States, such as in the Mediterranean Sea, where there are 14 non-Member States and seven Member States.

== First Implementation of the MSFD ==
EU Member States were given two years to transpose the MSFD into national legislation with the infringement deadline of 15 July 2010.

Initial assessments on current environmental status of waters and the environmental impacts of human activities were to be completed by 15 July 2012. By December 2013 "all but a few" Member States concerned had reported to the European Commission. Most states had reported on most articles and the 11 qualitative descriptors of GES, however the quality of report varied widely between countries and descriptors.

The target year of 2012 was set for establishing and maintaining ecologically representative systems of marine protected areas during the 7th Conference of the Parties to the Convention on Biological Diversity. The MSFD was designed to support this initiative.

Establishment and implementation of monitoring programmes for ongoing assessments and updates of targets were to be completed by 15 July 2014. All Member States apart from Malta, Greece and Poland reported their monitoring programmes on time.

The European Commission was set to present a first evaluation report on the implementation of the MSFD within two years of receiving all programmes of measure and, in any case, by 2019 at the latest. Subsequent reports by the European Commission are set to be published every six years thereafter. The initial 2017 report found that only a few Member States had operational monitoring programmes in place by 2014, with many members expecting to be fully in place by 2018 or after 2020, by which GES was expected to be achieved.

In 2018, the second cycle of MSFD implementation was set to start. The Commission recommended all Member States take action to fully implement monitoring programmes to avoid gaps in assessment by 2018.

2020 was the target set in the MSFD by which to achieve good environmental status in all marine environments. Provisions were outlined for two cases in which Member States could not achieve GES by 2020; if a Member State is unable to meet environmental targets due to actions outside of their control, i.e. due to other states' actions or inactions, or if an environmental issue is found but cannot be tackled by measures at the national level without compromising other community or international agreements. This goal was not achieved in all EU waters across all descriptors.

== Challenges in Achieving GES ==
The MSFD is perceived by policymakers and experts as an improvement for the protection of the European marine environment especially as regards biodiversity conservation. Despite this – as well as the fact that the MSFD is the largest attempt by the EU to protect and improve the health of European oceans and seas – GES was not achieved in all EU waters across all 11 descriptors. There are several factors that might contribute to explain this paradox.

=== The Framework Nature of the Directive ===
The first factor is related to the nature of the Directive as a 'framework directive'. Although the Commission in 2017 laid down assessment criteria and methodologies for defining GES, thereby limiting the initial much wider scope of the Member States in defining GES, the European Commission's steering capacity is still limited. This is because the MSFD does not prescribe how the Member States are to achieve or maintain GES. The implications of this are that Member States might not work towards the implementation of the Directive in the same vein, and that Member States might interpret GES to different degrees of stringency.

=== Clash Between Achieving GES and Pursuing Blue Growth? ===
The second factor is related to the MSFD being a part of the Integrated Maritime Policy, which also comprises the MSPD ('the Maritime Spatial Planning Directive'), also known as the 'Blue Growth Directive'. According to some scholars, there might, however, be an incompatibility between the MSPD's pursuit of Blue Growth while ensuring GES, and aspirations for blue economic growth might lead to increasing pressures on the marine environment, unless the EU succeeds in decoupling economic growth and environmental deterioration. Indeed, when the MSPD was launched in 2014, the increasing prevalence of economic policy rather than GES was already identified as a threat to the implementation of the MSFD. Other scholars highlight that blue growth have already had social and ecological consequences. This discussion about whether it is possible to achieve economic growth while protecting the environment, or if sustainable growth is an oxymoron, is, of course, not new, and tensions between environmental and economic interests were already manifest in the process leading to the adoption of the MSFD.

=== Institutional Ambiguity ===
The third factor is related to institutional ambiguity, which is a result of i) coordination and cooperation taking place through the Regional Seas Conventions (RSCs) and ii) the framework character of the Directive (see above). First, the regional aspect of the MSFD implementation causes ambiguity about authority and respective competences of the European Commission, the RSCs and Member States, and this leads to uncertainty and differing practices across regions. This is termed 'mismatch of scales', but this have been sought to be remedied by linking the implementation of the MSFD with the RSCs.

Institutional ambiguity also arises, however, when the approach and definitions of the RSCs differ from the aim of achieving GES of the MSFD. Across the four marine regions, that the MSFD identified, there are different levels of institutional ambiguity. The Baltic Sea has the lowest level, whilst the Mediterranean Sea have the highest. In between these two, the level of institutional ambiguity is low to moderate in the North Sea and moderate in the Black Sea. The lower levels of institutional ambiguity in the Northern Seas can be attributed to the fact that the membership of the RSCs is largely based on Member States of the EU, and vice versa for the Southern Seas. As non-Member States are not obligated to follow the MSFD, a high concentration of these in a region might hamper the achievement of GES.

=== Other Impediments ===
Other impediments that challenge an effective implementation of the MSFD include scientific uncertainty as regards how to organise knowledge gathering and -generation about ecological, social and economic pressures as well as uncertain existing information and problems of credibility and legitimacy. Some scholars argue that there is even a lack of ecological, social and economic data that can inform marine strategies. This is related to MSFD introducing a science-driven process for management of the marine environment, meaning that scientific inputs are integral to the development of marine strategies.

There are also challenges as regards policy coordination between related environmental policies and the MSFD, and between national, sectoral policies and the MSFD. Likewise, coordination of different stakeholder values and influences is vital, and is indeed an impediment to successful implementation. Other impediments worthy of mention include an insufficient monitoring budget, complex regulation and reporting, poor coordination among national agencies, lack of Member States' political willingness and capacity to cooperate, and lack of dedicated funding.

== See also ==
- European Green Deal
- European Maritime Safety Agency
- Water Framework Directive
- Habitats Directive
- Birds Directive
- Integrated coastal zone management
- Danish Marine Strategy
- International Maritime Organization
- Marine Spatial Planning
