= Floods Directive =

Directive 2007/60/EC

European Parliament
- Long title: Directive 2007/60/EC of the European Parliament and of the Council of 23 October 2007 on the assessment and management of flood risks
- Territorial extent: European Union
- Enacted by: European Parliament
- Enacted: 23 October 2007
- Enacted by: Council
- Commenced: 26 November 2007
- Status: In force

The Floods Directive (Directive 2007/60/EC) is legislation in the European Parliament on the assessment and management of flood risks. The floods directive basically prescribes a three-step procedure:

- Preliminary Flood Risk Assessment
- Risk Assessment
- Flood Risk Management Plans

== Steps ==
First step: Preliminary Flood Risk Assessment: The Floods Directive requires Member States to engage their government departments, agencies and other bodies to draw up a Preliminary Flood Risk Assessment. This assessment has to consider impacts on human health and life, the environment, cultural heritage and economic activity, with a legislative completion date of December 2011.

Second step: Risk Assessment: The information in this assessment will be used to identify the areas at significant risk which will then be modelled in order to produce flood hazard and risk maps. These maps are to be in place by December 2013 and will include detail on the flood extent, depth and level for three risk scenarios (high, medium and low probability).

Third step: Flood Risk Management Plans: Flood Risk Management Plans are meant to indicate to policy makers, developers, and the public the nature of the risk and the measures proposed to manage these risks. However, they are not formally binding (e.g. to land-use planning). The Flood Risk Management Plans are to be complete by December 2015. The Floods Directive prescribes an active involvement of all interested stakeholders in the process. The management plans are to focus on prevention, protection and preparedness. Also, flood risk management plans shall take into account the relevant environmental objectives of Article 4 of Directive 2000/60/EC, commonly known as the 'Water Framework Directive'.

== Transposition ==
The Floods Directive was transposed into Northern Ireland regulation in November 2009 and is called, "The Water Environment (Floods Directive) Regulations (Northern Ireland) 2009".

== See also ==
- 2010 Romanian floods
- 2010 Slovenia floods
- 2010 Var floods
- List of floods in Europe
- River basin management plans
- Rivers Agency
- Water pollution
- Hazard map
