= Groundwater Directive =

EU directive on the protection of groundwater against pollution and deterioration

Directive 2006/118/EC
- European Union directive
- Title: Groundwater Directive
- Made by: European Parliament & Council
- Journal reference: OJ L 372, 27.12.2006, p. 19–31

History
- Date made: 12 December 2006
- Entry into force: 17 January 2007
- Implementation date: 16 January 2009

Other legislation
- Amended by: Directive 2014/80/EU

The Groundwater Directive (GWD; full title: Directive 2006/118/EC of the European Parliament and of the Council of 12 December 2006 on the protection of groundwater against pollution and deterioration) is an EU directive establishing specific measures as provided for in the Water Framework Directive in order to prevent and control groundwater pollution.

In 2018, a total of 74% of EU groundwater bodies were assessed to be in "good chemical status". Agriculture has been identified as a major contributor to poor status due to nitrate and pesticide pollution.

== Background ==
The European Union first published legislation specifically for groundwater protection in 1979 (Directive 80/68/EEC) to limit the discharge of certain toxic substances from industrial sources.

Between 1991 and 1995, calls to implement measures avoiding long-term deterioration of freshwater sources by the year 2000 were recognised, as well as requests from the European Council to revise Directive 80/68/EEC due to concerns that groundwater resources remained seriously endangered by both pollutants and growing water extraction.

A 1995 report from the European Environment Agency for the Fifth Environmental Action Plan found that fresh water extraction rates had risen by 35% between 1970 and 1985. Groundwater beneath more than 85% of European agricultural lands (including central and eastern Europe) was also estimated to exceed guide levels of nitrate concentration. An estimated 65% of public water supply in the European Economic Area came from groundwater sources in the late 1980s.

In 1996, an action programme was adopted by the European Commission, introducing controls on abstraction of freshwater, and identifying the need to monitor freshwater quality and quantities. The European Parliament and Council subsequently requested the Commission to establish a framework for European water policy, leading to the adoption of the Water Framework Directive (WFD) in October 2000. The WFD aims to ensure a balance between extraction and recharge of groundwater, but resolving quality standards for chemical status was a complex challenge, requiring the proposal and adoption of a "daughter" directive clarifying the criteria for chemical status measures and pollution trends, This new Groundwater Directive was adopted in December of 2006.

== Objectives ==
The GWD provides the detailed procedures for meeting the WFD's environmental objectives for groundwater quality.

The specific measures include: criteria for the assessment of good groundwater chemical status; and criteria for the identification and reversal of upward trends in the concentration of pollutants.

Member states are required to establish threshold values for all pollutants and pollution indicators. The directive specifies a minimum list of pollutants that must be considered to identify groundwater bodies that are at risk of not meeting good chemical standards as determined by the WFD. Both the list of pollutants and quality standards are to be reviewed every six years.

== Quality Standards ==
The Water Framework Directive outlines strategies to prevent and control pollution of groundwater. It mandates the adoption of measures with conductivity and pollutant concentration parameters to achieve good groundwater chemical status. In particular, groundwater bodies must not exhibit effects of saline or pose significant damage to ecosystems dependent on the body to be considered "good status".

The Groundwater Directive addresses these quality standards with the following list of pollutants:

Pollutant	Quality Standards
Nitrates	50 mg/l
Active substances in pesticides, including their relevant metabolites, degradation and reaction products	0.1 μg/l 0.5 μg/l (total)

The quality standard specifies a total value for the sum of all individual pesticides detected and quantified in the monitoring procedures.

== Threshold Values ==
Member States are required to establish threshold values for all pollutants and indicators. The threshold values should be based on interactions between groundwater and dependent ecosystems; interference with legitimate uses of groundwater; pollutants that are characterised as risky; hydro-geological characteristics including information on natural background levels and water balance.

A minimum list of pollutants and indicators are specified for which Member States must consider establishing threshold values:

Description	Pollutants or indicators
Substances or ions or indicators which may occur naturally and/or as a result of human activities	Arsenic, Cadmium, Lead, Mercury, Ammonium, Chloride, Sulphate, Nitrates^{a}, Phosphorus (total)/Phosphates^{a}
Man-made synthetic substances	Trichloroethylene, Tetrachloroethylene
Parameters indicative of saline or other intrusions	Conductivity

== Upward Trends ==
Member States are required to identify significant upward trends in groundwater bodies that are at risk in accordance with the WFD. The Groundwater Directive mandates the usage of statistical methods, such as regression analysis, for time series of individual monitoring points.

Measures to reverse upward trends are expected to be implemented once pollutant concentration reaches 75% of the values specified by the GWD's quality standards.

Statistical methods employed by Member States have included ANOVA (sometimes combined with the LOESS method), the non-parametric Mann-Kendall test, Seasonal Kendall and Regional Kendall tests.

== Note ==
^a These pollutants were inserted in the Commission Directive 2014/80/EU of 20 June 2014

== See also ==
- Water Framework Directive
- European Union Law
- European Green Deal
- Water pollution
- Freshwater environmental quality parameters
