= Hazard map =

Visualization of vulnerable areas

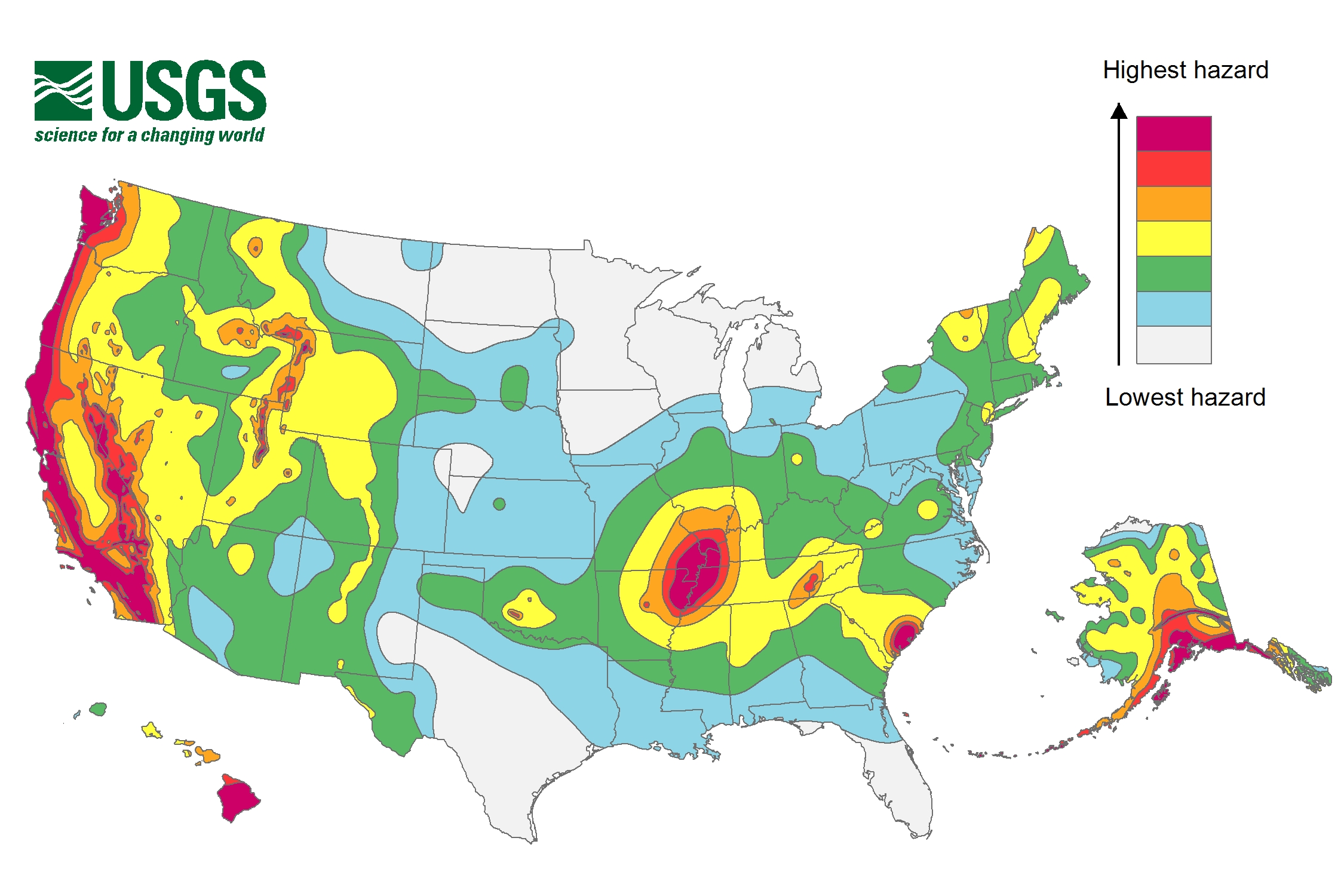
Example of a hazard map

A hazard map is a map that highlights areas that are affected by or are vulnerable to a particular hazard. They are typically created for natural hazards, such as earthquakes, volcanoes, landslides, flooding and tsunamis. Hazard maps help prevent serious damage and deaths.

== Uses ==
Hazard maps are created and used in conjunction with several natural disasters. Different hazard maps have different uses. For instance, the hazard map created by the Rizal Geological Survey is used by Rizalian insurance agencies in order to properly adjust insurance for people living in hazardous areas. Hazard maps created for flooding are also used in insurance rate adjustments. Hazard maps can also be useful in determining the risks of living in a certain area. Hazard maps can help people become aware of the dangers they might face from natural disasters in a specific area.

== Types ==
- Natural Disasters
  - Geological disasters
    - Avalanches and landslides
    - Earthquakes
      (See Seismic hazard map)
    - Volcanic eruptions
  - Hydrological disasters
    - Floods
    - Tsunami
    - Wildfires
- Non-Natural Disasters
  - Traffic accidents

== See also ==
- Seismic hazard map
- Disaster risk reduction
- Floods Directive
