= Helsinki Convention =

Environmental treaty

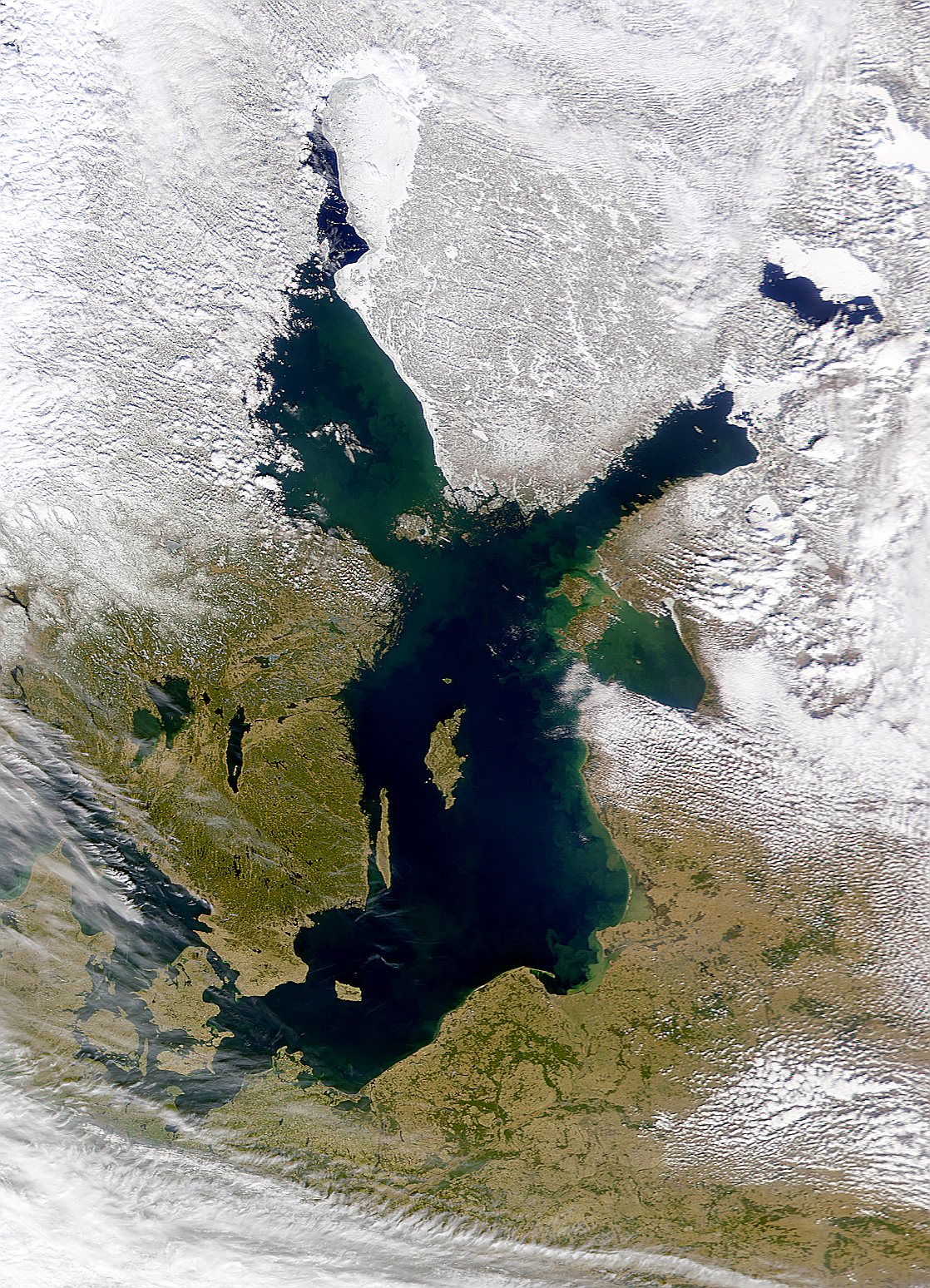
Baltic Sea in winter.

Convention on the Protection of the Marine Environment of the Baltic Sea Area is a 1992 international convention encompassing various measures for the prevention and elimination of pollution of the Baltic Sea. The convention is implemented by the Helsinki Commission (HELCOM).

== History ==
The first Convention on the Protection of the Marine Environment of the Baltic Sea Area was signed by Denmark, Finland, West Germany, East Germany, Poland, the USSR and Sweden in 1974 and entered into force on 3 May 1980. In 1992, the convention was updated due to geopolitical and environmental changes. The updated convention was signed by Denmark, Estonia, the European Community, Finland, Germany, Latvia, Lithuania, Poland, Russia and Sweden and entered into force on 17 January 2000.

== Summary of Provisions ==
The States-Parties to the Convention agreed individually or jointly to take all appropriate legislative, administrative or other relevant measures to prevent and eliminate pollution in order to promote the ecological restoration of the Baltic Sea Area and the preservation of its ecological balance.

The Parties undertake to apply:

- Precautionary principle, that is, to take preventive measures when there is reason to assume that substances or energy introduced, directly or indirectly, into the marine environment may create hazards to human health, harm living resources and marine ecosystems, damage amenities or interfere with other legitimate uses of the sea;
- Best Environmental Practice and Best Available Technology (criteria set out in Annex II);
- Polluter pays principle, that is, make the party responsible for producing pollution responsible for paying for the damage done to the environment.

The aim of the States-Parties to the Convention is to prevent and eliminate pollution of the marine environment of the Baltic Sea Area caused by harmful substances from all sources, including:

- from land-based sources (measures set out in Annex III);
- from ships (measures outlined in Annex IV);
- from incineration and dumping (exemptions from dumping provisions set out in Annex V);
- from exploration and exploitation on the seabed (measures related to the offshore exploration and exploration activities set out in Annex VI).

The States-Parties to the Convention are obligated to notify and enter into consultations with each other when an environmental impact assessment of a proposed activity predicts that the project is likely to cause a significant adverse impact on the marine environment of the Baltic Sea Area. Similarly, they are to notify and consult each other whenever a pollution incident in their territory is likely to cause pollution to the marine environment of the Baltic Sea Area outside its territory and adjacent maritime area.

The Convention sets up a Baltic Marine Environment Protection Commission (HELCOM) (originally set up pursuant to the first Helsinki Convention, its functions subsequently reviewed), whose responsibilities are to implement the Convention, make recommendations to the Parties, define pollution control criteria and objectives and promote additional measures in co-operation with respective governmental bodies of the Parties.

The Parties also undertake to implement measures to maintain adequate ability and to respond to pollution incidents in order to eliminate or minimize the consequences of these incidents and regularly report to the HELCOM commission on and inform the general public of the measures taken in accordance with the Convention.
