= Sustainable Process Index =

The Sustainable Process Index (SPI*) was developed in the 1990s at TU Graz by a team of scientists (substantially by Ch. Krotscheck) under the leadership of professor Michael Narodoslawsky. The SPI is a member of the ecological footprint family which aggregates and compares different ecological pressures. It allows to evaluate ecologic impacts of industrial products and services like energy production, industrial products, agriculture and buildings. It provides an encompassing evaluation that distinguishes sharply between fossil and renewable energy (as Global warming potential does) but taking other emissions to soil water and atmosphere into account as well. Based on the idea, that the primary income of the earth is Solar radiation, in accordance with the principle of Strong sustainability the surface of the earth is the basic dimension of the evaluation. The SPI is therefore in the same family of ecological measurement as the Ecological Footprint. These methods all measure the area that is necessary to support human activities. The SPI takes the whole life cycle into consideration starting from mining of raw materials to further transformation and production of goods to recycling to disposal of waste. This includes grey emissions, the emissions which originate from production and operation of infrastructures. The SPI method is based on the comparison of natural material fluxes with technological material fluxes. The conversion of mass and energy fluxes is strongly defined by two principles of Sustainability.

- Principle 1: Anthropogenic material flows must not alter the quality and the quantity of global bio- and geochemical cycles.
- Principle 2: Anthropogenic material flows must not exceed the local assimilation capacity and should be smaller than natural fluctuations in geogenic flows.

The SPI is the ratio of two areas. One is the area needed to embed a life cycle to generate a product or service in the Biosphere. The other is the statistical area available for every human being on earth, which is m² based on a global population of 7.39 billion people. Contrary to the Ecological Footprint the SPI also takes ocean surface into account, as oceans are key elements of many global material cycles (e.g. the Carbon cycle).

- SPI << 1 a SPI very much smaller than one means that the service (process, activity) is very ‘cheap’ for sustainability (e.g. goods of daily consume)
- 0.001 < SPI < 1 a SPI between zero and one means that the evaluated service (process, activity) can be suitable for the Sustainable Development
- SPI > 1 a SPI bigger than one means that the service (process, activity) is too inefficient for Sustainability – the benefit is too ‘expensive’

The earth’ surface and the atmosphere are complex buildings several compartments have to be considered for a comprehensive ecological evaluation. The SPI includes natural renewable rates, absorption rates and natural exchange rates of substances within and between the compartments air, soil and water. Practically this is defined with maximal rates of material and energy flows which can be absorbed by natural sinks of biosphere.

== Method ==
Human activities influence the natural environment in many different ways. Processes needed to execute these activities need resources, energy and human manpower. Production, delivery and consummation of goods generates emissions and waste. The SPI includes all these different issues affecting the environment. A total area A_{tot} which would be needed to embed human activities into ecosphere can so be aggregated.

A_{tot} = A_{R} + A_{E} + A_{I} + A_{S} + A_{P} [m^{2}] (1)

A_{R} = A_{RR} + A_{RF} + A_{RN} [m^{2}] (2)

A_{I} = A_{ID} + A_{II} [m^{2}] (3)

The sum for the total area is the sum of all partial areas (formula 1). A_{R}, the area needed to provide raw materials, is the sum (formula 2) of all areas needed to provide renewable resources (A_{RR}), fossil resources (A_{RF}) and non-renewable resources (A_{RN}). A_{E} is the area needed to provide process energy (incl. electricity). A_{I}, the area needed to provide the infrastructure for the process is the sum (formula 3) of direct land use (A_{ID}) and the area needed to provide the area for buildings and process plants (A_{II}). A_{S} is the area needed for the supply of the staff and A_{P} is the area needed for a sustainable embedding of emissions and waste into ecosphere. The SPI aggregates partial footprints from mass, energy and emission inventories of every sub-process and refers them to the end product. This means that A_{tot} is the total footprint of a considered product per measurement unit. Seven different categories were defined to guarantee a better visibility of the different impact categories:

- Direct land consumption
- Consumption of non-renewable resources
- Consumption of renewable resources
- Consumption of fossil resources
- Emissions to air
- Emissions to water
- Emissions to soil

== Fields of application ==
The SPI is applied for different ecological evaluations. Examples are:

- Renewable energy: renewable bioenergy system integration
- Renewable energy supply
- Personal footprint calculator
- Footprint evaluation for schools, Energy Scouts
- Ecological footprint for agriculture
- Lifestyle: Greengang vs. Captain Carbon
