= HELCOM =

Baltic Marine Environment Protection Commission (HELCOM)
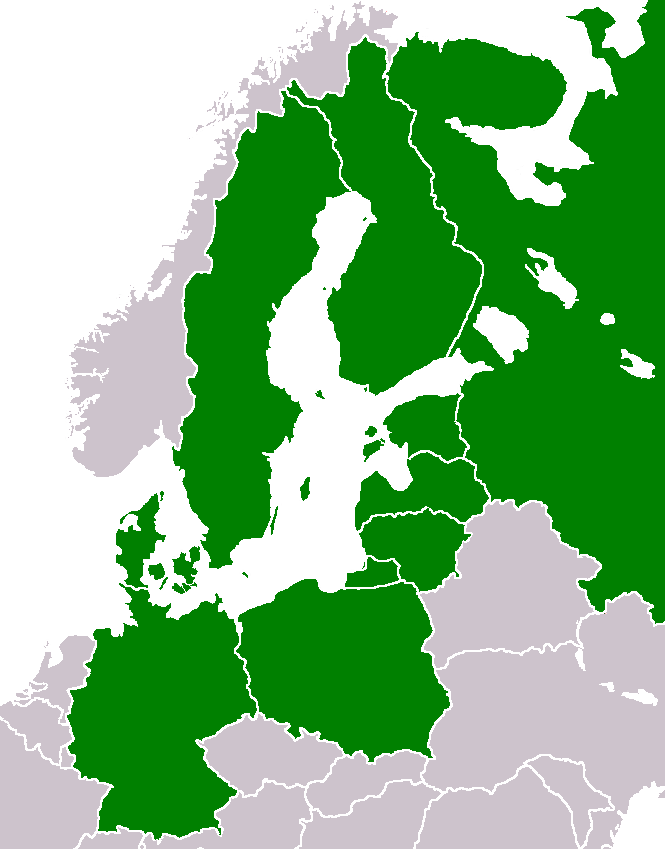
- Contracting parties of HELCOM
- Formation: 1974
- Type: IGO
- Legal status: Treaty-based
- Purpose: Protection of the Baltic Sea environment
- Location: Helsinki, Finland
- Official language: English
- Chairperson 2024-2026: Vitalijus Auglys
- Executive Secretary: Rüdiger Strempel
- Main organ: Ministerial Meeting
- Website: www.helcom.fi

The Baltic Marine Environment Protection Commission (Helsinki Commission, HELCOM) is an intergovernmental organization governing the Convention on the Protection of the Marine Environment of the Baltic Sea Area (Helsinki Convention). A regional sea convention and a platform for environmental policy making at the regional level, HELCOM works for the protection of the marine environment of the Baltic Sea. HELCOM consists of ten members – the nine Baltic Sea countries Denmark, Estonia, Finland, Germany, Latvia, Lithuania, Poland, Russia and Sweden, plus the European Union.

The Helsinki Convention was signed in 1974 by the Baltic Sea coastal countries to address the increasing environmental challenges from industrialisation and other human activities, and that were having a severe impact on the marine environment. The Helsinki Convention includes the protection of the Baltic Sea from all sources of pollution from land, air and sea. It also commits the signatories to take measures to conserve habitats and biological diversity and to ensure the sustainable use of marine resources. The Helsinki Convention was updated in 1992 to take into account the geopolitical changes and emerging environmental challenges in the region. The current version was ratified in 2000.

Contracting parties of HELCOM are:

- Denmark
- Estonia
- European Union
- Finland
- Germany
- Latvia
- Lithuania
- Poland
- Russia
- Sweden

The HELCOM Secretariat is located in Helsinki, Finland.

== Organization ==
HELCOM is organized around regular ministerial meetings and meetings of the lead delegates (HOD - Head of Delegation) where binding decisions and recommendations are agreed. Preparatory work for these meetings take place within eight main working groups. Members of the groups are nominated by the contracting parties and observers from non-governmental organizations, such as Coalition Clean Baltic.

=== HELCOM Working Groups ===
- WG GEAR HELCOM Working Group on the Implementation of the Ecosystem Approach
- WG Maritime HELCOM Maritime Working Group
- WG Sea-based pressure HELCOM Working Group on Reduction of Pressures from Sea-based Sources
- WG Response HELCOM Response Working Group
- WG BioDiv HELCOM Working Group on Biodiversity, Protection and Restoration State of the Environment and Nature Conservation
- WG Fish HELCOM Working Group on Ecosystem-based Sustainable Fisheries
- WG Source to sea HELCOM Working Group on the Source to Sea Management of Nutrients and Hazardous Substances and Sustainable Agricultural Practices
- HELCOM-VASAB MSP WG Joint HELCOM-VASAB Maritime Spatial Planning Working Group

In addition, the working groups have formed a number of expert groups with nationally nominated members and observers for specialized tasks.

== See also ==
- Marine protected area
- OSPAR
