= River basin management plans =

Water resources management

River basin management plans are a management tool in integrated water resources management. They generally contain descriptions of the water resources in a drainage basin and water allocation plans.

== Europe ==
River Basin Management Plans are a requirement of the Water Framework Directive and a means of achieving the protection, improvement and sustainable use of the water environment across Europe. This includes surface freshwaters (including lakes, streams and rivers), groundwater, ecosystems such as some wetlands that depend on groundwater, estuaries and coastal waters out to one nautical mile.

The Directive requires member states to aim to achieve at least good status in each water body within their river basin districts. Each member state must produce a plan for each of the river basin districts within its territory.

Plans must include: objectives for each water body; reasons for not achieving objectives where relevant; and the programme of actions required to meet the objectives.

River Basin Management Plans were published for several member states in December 2010.

== River basin management in a changing climate - a Guidance document ==
In November 2009, Water Directors of EU Member States issued a guidance document on adaptation to climate change in water management. The document is the first result of numerous actions included in the European Commission White Paper Adapting to climate change; Towards a European framework for action. The document includes guidance on how to take climate change into account in the implementation of the Water Framework Directive, the Floods Directive and the Strategy on Water Scarcity and Droughts.

== See also ==
- Detention basin
- Murray-Darling Basin Plan,
