= River morphology =

Change in shape and direction of river channels over time

The term river morphology and its synonym stream morphology are used to describe the shapes of river channels and how they change in shape and direction over time. The morphology of a river channel is a function of a number of processes and environmental conditions, including the composition and erodibility of the bed and banks (e.g., sand, clay, bedrock); erosion comes from the power and consistency of the current, and can affect the formation of the river's path. It also can be affected by vegetation and the rate of plant growth; the availability of sediment; the size and composition of the sediment moving through the channel; the rate of sediment transport through the channel and the rate of deposition on the floodplain, banks, bars, and bed; and regional aggradation or degradation due to subsidence or uplift. River morphology can also be affected by human interaction. An example of human-induced change in river morphology is dam construction, which alters the ebb flow of fluvial water and sediment, therefore creating or shrinking estuarine channels. A river regime is a dynamic equilibrium system used to classify rivers into different categories. The four categories of river regimes are sinuous canali-form rivers, sinuous point bar rivers, sinuous braided rivers, and non-sinuous braided rivers.

The study of river morphology is accomplished in the field of fluvial geomorphology, the scientific term.

== See also ==
- Bedload, Suspended load
- Sediment, sedimentation, erosion
- River, Stream, Canal
- Water, Water resource
- Flood
- Rosgen Stream Classification
