= Freshwater environmental quality parameters =

Branch of environmental chemistry

Earth's water cycle

Freshwater environmental quality parameters are those chemical, physical and biological parameters that can be used to characterise a freshwater body. Because almost all water bodies are dynamic in their composition, the relevant quality parameters are typically expressed as a range of expected concentrations.

They include the natural and man-made chemical, biological and microbiological characteristics of rivers, lakes and ground-waters, the ways they are measured and the ways that they change. The values or concentrations attributed to such parameters can be used to describe the pollution status of an environment, its biotic status or to predict the likelihood or otherwise of a particular organisms being present. Monitoring of environmental quality parameters is a key activity in managing the environment, restoring polluted environments and anticipating the effects of man-made changes on the environment.

== Characterisation ==
The first step in understanding the chemistry of freshwater is to establish the relevant concentrations of the parameters of interest. Conventionally this is done by taking representative samples of the water for subsequent analysis in a laboratory. However, in-situ monitoring using hand-held analytical equipment or using bank-side monitoring stations are also used.

=== Sampling ===
Freshwaters are surprisingly difficult to sample because they are rarely homogeneous and their quality varies during the day and during the year. In addition the most representative sampling locations are often at a distance from the shore or bank increasing the logistic complexity.

==== Rivers ====
Filling a clean bottle with river water is a very simple task, but a single sample is only representative of that point along the river the sample was taken from and at that point in time. Understanding the C hemistry of a whole river, or even a significant tributary, requires prior investigation to understand how homogeneous or mixed the flow is and to determine if the quality changes during the course of a day and during the course of a year. Almost all natural rivers will have very significant patterns of change through the day and through the seasons. Water remote sensing offers a spatially continuous tool to improve understanding of spatial and temporal river water quality. Many rivers also have a very large flow that is unseen. This flows through underlying gravel and sand layers and is called hyporheic flow. How much mixing there is between the hyporheic zone and the water in the open channel will depend on a variety of factors, some of which relate to flows leaving aquifers which may have been storing water for many years.

=== Ground-waters ===
Ground waters by their very nature are often very difficult to access to take a sample. As a consequence the majority of ground-water data comes from samples taken from springs, wells, water supply bore-holes and in natural caves. In recent decades as the need to understand ground water dynamics has increased, an increasing number or monitoring bore-holes have been drilled into aquifers.

=== Lakes ===
Lakes and ponds can be very large and support a complex eco-system in which environmental parameters vary widely in all three physical dimensions and with time. Large lakes in the temperate zone often stratify in the warmer months into a warmer upper layers rich in oxygen and a colder lower layer with low oxygen levels. In the autumn, falling temperatures and occasional high winds result in the mixing of the two layers into a more homogeneous whole. When stratification occurs it not only affects oxygen levels but also many related parameters such as iron, phosphate and manganese which are all changed in their chemical form by change in the redox potential of the environment.

Lakes also receive waters, often from many different sources with varying qualities. Solids from stream inputs will typically settle near the mouth of the stream and depending on a variety of factors the incoming water may float over the surface of the lake, sink beneath the surface or rapidly mix with the lake water. All of these phenomena can skew the results of any environmental monitoring unless the process are well understood.

== Mixing zones ==
Where two rivers meet at a confluence there exists a mixing zone. A mixing zone may be very large and extend for many miles as in the case of the Mississippi and Missouri rivers in the United States and the River Clwyd and River Elwy in North Wales. In a mixing zone water chemistry may be very variable and can be difficult to predict. The chemical interactions are not just simple mixing but may be complicated by biological processes from submerged macrophytes and by water joining the channel from the hyporheic zone or from springs draining an aquifer.

== Geological inputs ==
The geology that underlies a river or lake has a major impact on its chemistry. A river flowing across very ancient precambrian schists is likely to have dissolved very little from the rocks and maybe similar to de-ionised water at least in the headwaters. Conversely a river flowing through chalk hills, and especially if its source is in the chalk, will have a high concentration of carbonates and bicarbonates of Calcium and possibly Magnesium.

As a river progresses along its course it may pass through a variety of geological types and it may have inputs from aquifers that do not appear on the surface anywhere in the locality.

== Atmospheric inputs ==
Oxygen is probably the most important chemical constituent of surface water chemistry, as all aerobic organisms require it for survival. It enters the water mostly via diffusion at the water-air interface. Oxygen's solubility in water decreases as water temperature increases. Fast, turbulent streams expose more of the water's surface area to the air and tend to have low temperatures and thus more oxygen than slow, backwaters. Oxygen is a by-product of photosynthesis, so systems with a high abundance of aquatic algae and plants may also have high concentrations of oxygen during the day. These levels can decrease significantly during the night when primary producers switch to respiration. Oxygen can be limiting if circulation between the surface and deeper layers is poor, if the activity of animals is very high, or if there is a large amount of organic decay occurring such as following Autumn leaf-fall.

Most other atmospheric inputs come from man-made or anthropogenic sources the most significant of which are the oxides of sulphur produced by burning sulphur rich fuels such as coal and oil which give rise to acid rain. The chemistry of sulphur oxides is complex both in the atmosphere and in river systems. However the effect on the overall chemistry is simple in that it reduces the pH of the water making it more acidic. The pH change is most marked in rivers with very low concentrations of dissolved salts as these cannot buffer the effects of the acid input. Rivers downstream of major industrial conurbations are also at greatest risk. In parts of Scandinavia and West Wales and Scotland many rivers became so acidic from oxides of sulphur that most fish life was destroyed and pHs as low as pH4 were recorded during critical weather conditions.

== Anthropogenic inputs ==
The majority of rivers on the planet and many lakes have received or are receiving inputs from human-kind's activities. In the industrialised world, many rivers have been very seriously polluted, at least during the 19th and the first half of the 20th centuries. Although in general there has been much improvement in the developed world, there is still a great deal of river pollution apparent on the planet.

== Toxicity ==
In most environmental situations the presence or absence of an organism is determined by a complex web of interactions only some of which will be related to measurable chemical or biological parameters. Flow rate, turbulence, inter and intra specific competition, feeding behaviour, disease, parasitism, commensalism and symbiosis are just a few of the pressures and opportunities facing any organism or population. Most chemical constituents favour some organisms and are less favourable to others. However, there are some cases where a chemical constituent exerts a toxic effect. i.e. where the concentration can kill or severely inhibit the normal functioning of the organism. Where a toxic effect has been demonstrated this may be noted in the sections below dealing with the individual parameters.

== Chemical constituents ==
=== Colour and turbidity ===
Often it is the colour of freshwater or how clear or hazy the water is that is the most obvious visual characteristic. Unfortunately neither colour nor turbidity are strong indicators of the overall chemical composition of water. However both colour and turbidity reduce the amount of light penetrating the water and can have significant impact on algae and macrophytes. Some algae in particular are highly dependent on water with low colour and turbidity.

Many rivers draining high moor-lands overlain by peat have a very deep yellow brown colour caused by dissolved humic acids.

=== Organic constituents ===
One of the principal sources of elevated concentrations of organic chemical constituents is from treated sewage.

Dissolved organic material is most commonly measured using either the Biochemical oxygen demand (BOD) test or the Chemical oxygen demand (COD) test. Organic constituents are significant in river chemistry for the effect that they have on dissolved oxygen concentration and for the impact that individual organic species may have directly on aquatic biota.

Any organic and degradable material consumes oxygen as it decomposes. Where organic concentrations are significantly elevated the effects on oxygen concentrations can be significant and as conditions get extreme the river bed may become anoxic.

Some organic constituents such as synthetic hormones, pesticides, phthalates have direct metabolic effects on aquatic biota and even on humans drinking water taken from the river. Understanding such constituents and how they can be identified and quantified is becoming of increasing importance in the understanding of freshwater chemistry.

=== Metals ===
A wide range of metals may be found in rivers from natural sources where metal ores are present in the rocks over which the river flows or in the aquifers feeding water into the river. However many rivers have an increased load of metals because of industrial activities which include mining and quarrying and the processing and use of metals.

==== Iron ====
Iron, usually as Fe^{+++} is a common constituent of river waters at very low levels. Higher iron concentrations in acidic springs or an anoxic hyporheic zone may cause visible orange/brown staining or semi-gelatinous precipitates of dense orange iron bacterial floc carpeting the river bed. Such conditions are very deleterious to most organisms and can cause serious damage in a river system.

Coal mining is also a very significant source of Iron both in mine-waters and from stocking yards of coal and from coal processing. Long abandoned mines can be a highly intractable source of high concentrations of Iron. Low levels of iron are common in spring waters emanating from deep-seated aquifers and maybe regarding as health giving springs. Such springs are commonly called Chalybeate springs and have given rise to a number of Spa towns in Europe and the United States.

==== Zinc ====
Zinc is normally associated with metal mining, especially Lead and Silver mining but is also a component pollutant associated with a variety of other metal mining activities and with Coal mining. Zinc is toxic at relatively low concentrations to many aquatic organisms. Microregma starts to show a toxic reaction at concentrations as low as 0.33 mg/L.

==== Heavy metals ====
Lead and silver in river waters are commonly found together and associated with lead mining. Impacts from very old mines can be very long-lived. In the River Ystwyth in Wales for example, the effects of silver and lead mining in the 17th and 18th centuries in the headwaters still causes unacceptably high levels of Zinc and Lead in the river water right down to its confluence with the sea. Silver is very toxic even at very low concentrations but leaves no visible evidence of its contamination.

Lead is also highly toxic to freshwater organisms and to humans if the water is used as drinking water. As with Silver, Lead pollution is not visible to the naked eye. The River Rheidol in west Wales had a major series of lead mines in its headwaters until the end of the 19th century and its mine discharges and waste tips remain to this day. In 1919 - 1921 only 14 species of invertebrates were found in the lower Rheidol when Lead concentrations were between 0.2ppm and 0.5ppm. By 1932 the lead concentration had reduced to 0.02ppm to 0.1ppm because of the abandonment of mining and, at those concentrations, the bottom fauna had stabilized to 103 species including three leeches.

Coal mining is also a very significant source of metals, especially Iron, Zinc and Nickel particularly where the coal is rich if pyrites which oxidises on contact with the air producing a very acidic leachate which is able to dissolve metals from the coal.

Significant levels of copper are unusual in rivers and where it does it occur the source is most likely to be mining activities, coal stocking, or pig farming. Rarely elevated levels may be of geological origin. Copper is acutely toxic to many freshwater organisms, especially algae, at very low concentrations and significant concentration in river water may have serious adverse effects on the local ecology.

=== Nitrogen ===
Nitrogenous compounds have a variety of sources including washout of oxides of nitrogen from the atmosphere, some geological inputs and some from macrophyte and algal nitrogen fixation. However, for many rivers in the proximity of humans, the largest input is from sewage whether treated or untreated. The nitrogen derives from breakdown products of proteins found in urine and faeces. These products, being very soluble, often pass through sewage treatment process and are discharged into rivers as a component of sewage treatment effluent. Nitrogen may be in the form of nitrate, nitrite, ammonia or ammonium salts or what is termed albuminoid nitrogen or nitrogen still within an organic proteinoid molecule.

The differing forms of nitrogen are relatively stable in most river systems with nitrite slowly transforming into nitrate in well oxygenated rivers and ammonia transforming into nitrite/ nitrate. However, the process are slow in cool rivers and reduction in concentration may more often be attributed to simple dilution. All forms of nitrogen are taken up by macrophytes and algae and elevated levels of nitrogen are often associated with overgrowths of plants or eutrophication. These can have the effect of blocking channels and inhibiting navigation. However, ecologically, the more significant effect is on dissolved oxygen concentrations which may become super-saturated during daylight due to plant photosynthesis but then drop to very low levels during darkness as plant respiration uses up the dissolved oxygen. Coupled with the release of oxygen in photosynthesis is the creation of bi-carbonate ions which cause a steep rise in pH and this is matched in darkness as carbon dioxide is released through respiration which substantially lowers the pH. Thus high levels of nitrogenous compounds tends to lead to eutrophication with extreme variations in parameters which in turn can substantially degrade the ecological worth of the watercourse.

Ammonium ions also have a toxic effect, especially on fish. The toxicity of ammonia is dependent on both pH and temperature and an added complexity is the buffering effect of the blood/water interface across the gill membrane which masks any additional toxicity over about pH 8.0. The management of river chemistry to avoid ecological damage is particularly difficult in the case of ammonia as a wide range of potential scenarios of concentration, pH and temperature have to be considered and the diurnal pH fluctuation caused by photosynthesis considered. On warm summer days with high-bi-carbonate concentrations unexpectedly toxic conditions can be created.

=== Phosphorus ===
Phosphorus compounds are usually found as relatively insoluble phosphates in river water and, except in some exceptional circumstances, their origin is agriculture or human sewage. Phosphorus can encourage excessive growths of plants and algae and contribute to eutrophication. If a river discharges into a lake or reservoir phosphate can be mobilised year after year by natural processes. In the summer time, lakes stratify so that warm oxygen rich water floats on top of cold oxygen poor water. In the warm upper layers - the epilimnion- plants consume the available phosphate. As the plants die in the late summer they fall into the cool water layers underneath - the hypolimnion - and decompose. During winter turn-over, when a lake becomes fully mixed through the action of winds on a cooling body of water - the phosphates are spread throughout the lake again to feed a new generation of plants. This process is one of the principal causes of persistent algal blooms at some lakes.

=== Arsenic ===
Geological deposits of arsenic may be released into rivers where deep ground-waters are exploited as in parts of Pakistan. Many metalloid ores such as lead, gold and copper contain traces of arsenic and poorly stored tailings may result in arsenic entering the hydrological cycle.

=== Solids ===
Inert solids are produced in all montane rivers as the energy of the water helps grind away rocks into gravel, sand and finer material. Much of this settles very quickly and provides an important substrate for many aquatic organisms. Many salmonid fish require beds of gravel and sand in which to lay their eggs. Many other types of solids from agriculture, mining, quarrying, urban run-off and sewage may block-out sunlight from the river and may block interstices in gravel beds making them useless for spawning and supporting insect life.

=== Bacterial, viral and parasite inputs ===
Both agriculture and sewage treatment produce inputs into rivers with very high concentrations of bacteria and viruses including a wide range of pathogenic organisms. Even in areas with little human activity significant levels of bacteria and viruses can be detected originating from fish and aquatic mammals and from animals grazing near rivers such as deer. Upland waters draining areas frequented by sheep, goats or deer may also harbour a variety of opportunistic human parasites such as liver fluke. Consequently, there are very few rivers from which the water is safe to drink without some form of sterilisation or disinfection. In rivers used for contact recreation such as swimming, safe levels of bacteria and viruses can be established based on risk assessment.

Under certain conditions bacteria can colonise freshwaters occasionally making large rafts of filamentous mats known as sewage fungus – usually Sphaerotilus natans. The presence of such organisms is almost always an indicator of extreme organic pollution and would be expected to be matched with low dissolved oxygen concentrations and high BOD values.

E. coli bacteria have been commonly found in recreational waters and their presence is used to indicate the presence of recent fecal contamination, but E. coli presence may not be indicative of human waste. E. coli are found in all warm-blooded animals. E. coli have also been found in fish and turtles. Enterobacteria may also persist in the environment in mud, sediments, sand and soil for considerable lengths of time.

=== pH ===
pH in rivers is affected by the geology of the water source, atmospheric inputs and a range of other chemical contaminants. pH is only likely to become an issue on very poorly buffered upland rivers where atmospheric sulphur and nitrogen oxides may very significantly depress the pH as low as pH4 or in eutrophic alkaline rivers where photosynthetic bi-carbonate ion production in photosynthesis may drive the pH up above pH10.

== See also ==
- Drinking water quality standards
- Harmonised monitoring scheme
