= Water Framework Directive =

Directive

Directive 2000/60/EC
- European Union directive
- Title: Water Framework Directive
- Made by: European Parliament & Council
- Made under: Article 175(1)
- Journal reference: OJL 327, 22 December 2000, pp. 1–73

History
- Date made: 23 October 2000
- Entry into force: 22 December 2000
- Implementation date: 22 December 2003

Other legislation
- Amended by: Decision No 2455/2001/EC, Directive 2008/32/EC

The Water Framework Directive (WFD; 2000/60/EC) is an EU directive to establish a framework for the protection of all water bodies (including marine waters up to one nautical mile from shore) by 2015. The WFD establishes a programme and timetable for Member States to set up river basin management plans by 2009.

== Objectives of the Directive ==
The Directive aims for "good status" for all ground and surface waters (rivers, lakes, transitional waters, and coastal waters) in the EU. The purpose of the WFD is to prevent deterioration of the water bodies, enhance status of aquatic ecosystems, reduce pollution from priority substances, promote sustainable water use and contribute to mitigate the effects of floods and droughts.

The ecological and chemical status of surface waters are assessed according to the following criteria:

- Biological quality (fish, benthic invertebrates, aquatic flora)
- Hydromorphological quality such as river bank structure, river continuity or substrate of the river bed
- Physical-chemical quality such as temperature, oxygenation and nutrient conditions
- Chemical quality that refers to environmental quality standards for river basin specific pollutants. These standards specify maximum concentrations for specific water pollutants. If even one such concentration is exceeded, the water body will not be classed as having a “good ecological status”.

The Water Framework Directive stipulates that groundwater must achieve "good quantitative status" and "good chemical status" by 2015. Groundwater bodies are classified as either "good" or "poor". Ecological quality ratios are used to determine the water quality status, representing the relationship between measured biological values observed in water bodies, against the relevant reference conditions. A quality ratio of one represents high ecological status, while zero represents bad ecological status.

Article 14 of the directive requires member states "to encourage the active involvement of interested parties" in the implementation of the directive. This is generally acknowledged to be an assimilation of the Aarhus Convention.

On 26 October 2022, the European Commission published a proposal for amendment of the WFD as well as the 2006 Groundwater Directive (GWD), and the 2008 Environmental Quality Standards Directive (EQSD). The proposal aims to align the directives with the 2020 European Green Deal by updating lists of pollutants, updating quality standards, improving assessment of combination effects and ensuring that the legal framework of the directives can swiftly align with scientific findings.

== Spatial management of river basins ==
The Water Framework Directive defines river basin districts as the main unit for management of river basins. These areas have been designated, not according to administrative or political boundaries, but rather according to the river basin (the spatial catchment area of the river) as a natural geographical and hydrological unit. As rivers often cross national borders, representatives from several Member States have to co-operate and work together for the management of the basin (so-called transboundary basins). They are managed according to River Basin Management Plans, which should provide a clear indication of how the objectives set for the river basin are to be reached within the required timescale. Lists of priority substances and pollutants are reviewed every six years.

To facilitate data recording, each stretch of water is given a "Water Framework Directive ID" ("WFDID" or "Waterbody ID"). For example, the stretch of the River Tame, in the West Midlands of England, from the River Blythe to River Anker is designated as GB104028046440.

== Transgressions ==
The Ebro River Transfer, a project from the Spanish National Hydrological Plan of 2001 was highly criticised as being contrary to the principles of the EU Water Framework Directive, and later put on hold. The project planned to transfer huge amounts of water from the Ebro River to the south-east of Spain with the construction of 120 dams.

In October 2007, the European Commission formally notified Ireland that their initial adoption of legislation was insufficient, followed by a reasoned opinion in November 2011. Ireland adopted amended legislation in 2009, 2010 and 2014, although shortcomings were identified in authorization and registration controls for water abstraction, impoundment and hydromorphology changes, such as dams. Despite new legislation in June and December 2022, the Commission considered the efforts of Irish authorities as unsatisfactory and referred Ireland to the Court of Justice.

== WFD in the UK after Brexit ==
The Water Environment (Water Framework Directive) (England and Wales) Regulations 2017 updated the 2003 framework in England and Wales, with separate regulations applying to Scotland and Northern Ireland.

Before the UK joined what was then the "Common Market", water body management was organised by river basins; first by the River Boards, then the River Authorities, then the Water Authorities and finally the Environment Agency in England,Natural Resources Wales in Wales and SEPA in Scotland. This is a long tradition of river basin management which the UK will retain in its approach to the spatial management of river basins. Each River Basin District (RBD) will continue to be required to produce a River Basin Management Plan. An RBD is defined as "the area of land and sea, made up of one or more neighbouring river basins together with their associated groundwaters and coastal waters".

== See also ==
- Groundwater Directive
- European Green Deal
- Ecological assessment
- Marine debris
- Water pollution
- Freshwater environmental quality parameters
