= Vučić (disambiguation) =

Vučić is a South Slavic surname.

Vučić may also refer to:

- Vučić, Rača, Serbia, a village
- Vučić family, a noble family from the city of Dubrovnik

== See also ==
- Vučica (disambiguation)
