= Vučić =

Vučić (Note: Serbian Cyrillic: Вучић, pronounced [vǔtʃitɕ]) is a South Slavic surname. Notable people with the surname include:

- Aleksandar Vučić (born 1970), president of Serbia from 2017 to 2026
- Andrej Vučić, Serbian businessman, brother of Aleksandar
- Borka Vučić (1926–2009), acting president of the National Assembly of the Republic of Serbia
- Dragan Vučić (1955–2020), Serbian-Macedonian composer and singer
- The Vučić family, a noble family from Dubrovnik
- Ivan Bunić Vučić (1591–1658), Croatian politician and poet
- Martin Vučić, Macedonian pop musician
- Sanja Vučić (born 1993), Serbian singer
- Toma Vučić Perišić (1787–1859), Serbian politician and military leader

== See also ==
- Vučević
- Vukić
