= First Lady of Serbia =

The First Lady of Serbia (Serbian: прва дама Србије), officially Spouse of the President of the Republic of Serbia (Serbian: Супружник председника Републике Србије) is the official title for the spouse of the President of Serbia. The title has been officially used since 1990, when the office of President of the Republic was established by the Constitution of Serbia. The position of First Lady is unofficial, and comes with no official duties. The current spouse of the President of the Republic of Serbia is Tamara Vučić, wife of Aleksandar Vučić.

== List of First Ladies and Gentlemen since 1990 ==
Photo	Name	Term Start	Term End	President of the Republic
	Mirjana Marković	1990	1997	Slobodan Milosevic
	Olga Milutinovic	1997	2002	Milan Milutinovic
	Tatjana Tadic	2004	2012	Boris Tadic
	Ranko Dejanovic	2012	2012	Slavica Dukic Dejanovic (acting)
	Dragica Nikolic	2012	2017	Tomislav Nikolic
	Tamara Vucic	2017	2026	Aleksandar Vucic
	Position vacant	2026	present	Ana Brnabic (acting)
