= Tamara Vučić =

First Lady of Serbia

- Тамара Вучић
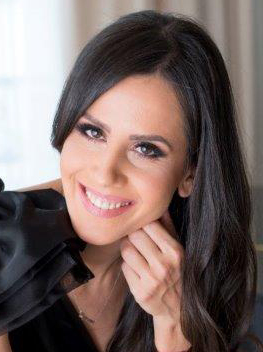
- Vučić in 2017

First Lady of Serbia
- In role 31 May 2017 – 27 September 2026
- President: Aleksandar Vučić
- Preceded by: Dragica Nikolić
- Succeeded by: Vacant

Personal details
- Born: Tamara Đukanović; 11 April 1981 (age 45) Belgrade, SR Serbia, SFR Yugoslavia
- Spouse: Aleksandar Vučić (m. 2013)
- Children: 1
- Education: University of Belgrade

Tamara Vučić (née Đukanović; Serbian Cyrillic: Тамара Вучић, née Ђукановић; born 11 April 1981) is the wife of the former President of Serbia, Aleksandar Vučić. She served as the First Lady of Serbia from 31 May 2017 until 27 September 2026.

== Biography ==
She was born in Belgrade. She grew up in Loznica, where she finished primary and high school. She graduated from the Faculty of Philology, University of Belgrade.

After a career as a television journalist, she chose diplomacy for her profession and has been working at the Ministry of Foreign Affairs of the Republic of Serbia since 2010. She graduated from the Diplomatic Academy of the Ministry of Foreign Affairs. She speaks English and French.

She is involved in humanitarian work and often attends humanitarian events. She is dedicated to humanitarian activities, with a special focus on the welfare of children and the importance of early development. She supports the work of the Young Scientists Forum in Niš, which has been organized for over a decade.

She is the second wife of Aleksandar Vučić, the president of Serbia. It is not publicly known when they became married. She has not been involved in her husband's political campaign.

In June 2017, she gave birth to their son, Vukan.

Honorary titles
Preceded by Dragica Nikolić	First Lady of Serbia; 2017–2026	Vacant
