= Vučica =

Vučica may refer to:

- Vučica (river), in Croatia
- Vučica, Danilovgrad, Montenegro

== See also ==
- Vučić (disambiguation)
