= Vučić, Rača =

Vučić Вучић
- village
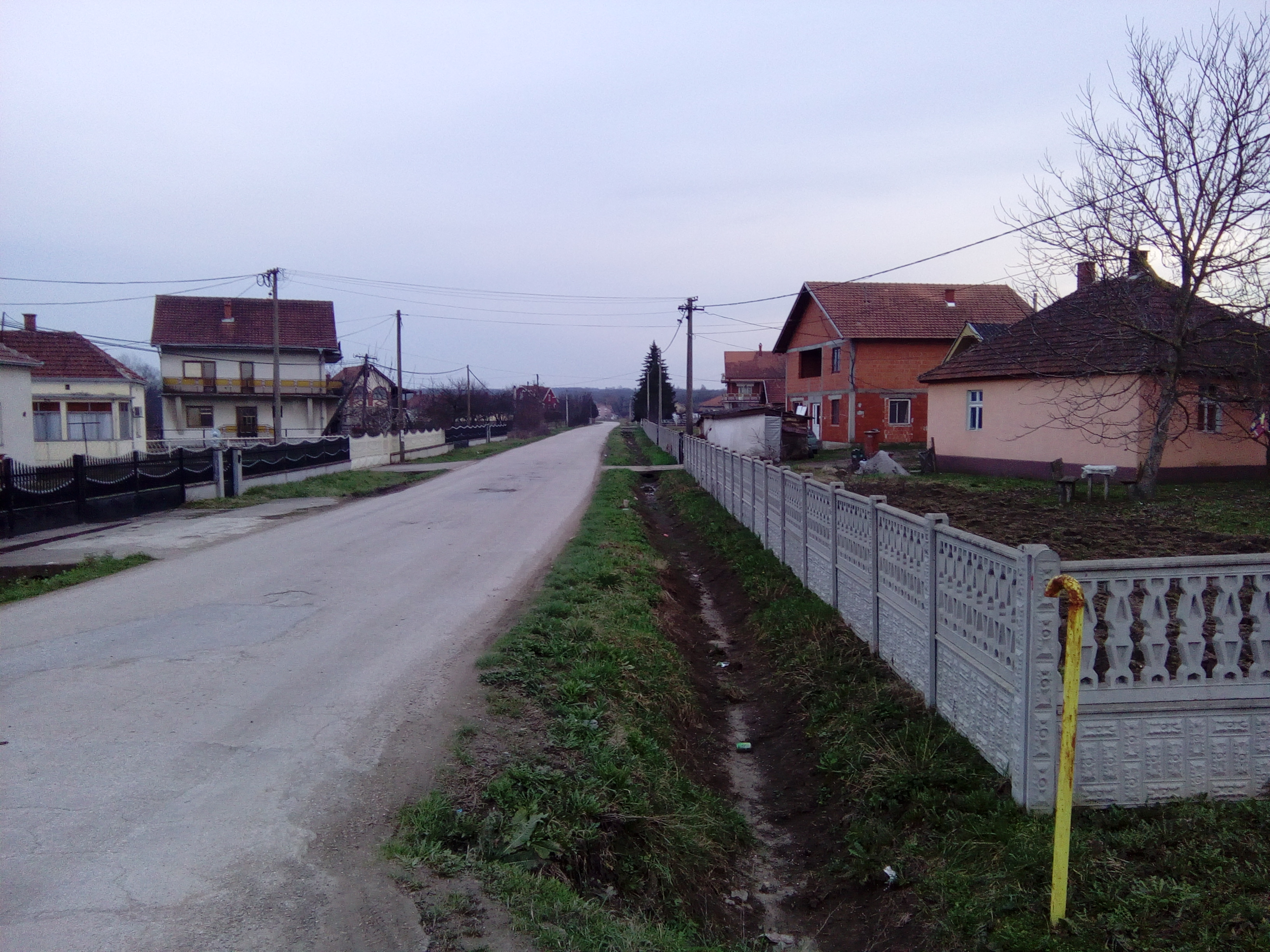
- Interactive map of Vučić
- Coordinates: 44°12′12″N 20°58′24″E
- Country: Serbia
- District: Šumadija
- Municipality: Rača
- Elevation: 180 m (590 ft)

Population (2011)
  - Total: 836
- Time zone: UTC+1 (CET)
  - Summer (DST): UTC+2 (CEST)

Vučić (Serbian Cyrillic: Вучић) is a village in the municipality of Rača in central Serbia. The village is located 30 km from the city of Kragujevac. In the 2011 census, the village had 836 residents.

There is a four-grade elementary school in the village with 25 students. During the 2014 Southeast Europe floods, the village and surrounding fields were flooded.
