= Andrej Vučić =

Serbian businessman

- Андреј Вучић
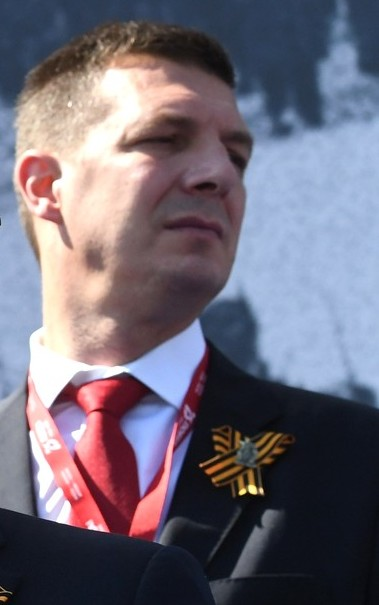
- Vučić in 2020
- Born: 1972; Belgrade, SR Serbia, SFR Yugoslavia
- Political party: Serbian Progressive Party, Serbian Radical Party (formerly)
- Relatives: Aleksandar Vučić (brother)

Andrej Vučić (Serbian Cyrillic: Андреј Вучић, born 1972) is a Serbian businessman and politician. He is an influential official of the populist Serbian Progressive Party.

== Early life ==
Andrej Vučić is the son of Anđelina and Anđelko Vučić, and the younger brother of Aleksandar Vučić, the former President of Serbia.

Whilst working at the Institute for Banknote and Coin Manufacturing, Andrej Vučić's ID card and signature were allegedly stolen and used to incorporate the company Asomakum, a subject of internal discussions related to fraud in the National Assembly of the Republic of Serbia, and subject to an official prosecutorial decision in Belgrade's Court in 2011 regarding tax evasion. Andrej Vučić filed a claim of stolen identity in the case.

== Career ==
In September 2014, during a Pride parade in Belgrade, a group of armed national guards physically attacked Andrej Vučić and his bodyguards.

In September 2015, five members of American Congress (Eddie Bernice Johnson, Carlos Curbelo, Scott Perry, Adam Kinzinger, and Zoe Lofgren) submitted to then Vice President of the United States Joseph Biden that Andrej Vučić and his two close associates, Nikola Petrovi and Zoran Korać, were leading a group spearheading a smear campaign to limit freedom of speech in Serbian media. They claimed that the group had strengthened their own influence, and spurned an interest in energy, telecommunications, infrastracture and jobs projects in the country.

Vučić was an executive at the Institute for Banknote and Coin Manufacturing at the National Bank of Serbia and a former board member of the sports team KK Crvena Zvezda. The former Mayor of Belgrade, Siniša Mali, has claimed that his candidacy for the mayoral position was at the urging of Andrej Vučić.

On 31 December 2024, at the height of the anti-corruption protests against his regime, Aleksandar Vučić claimed he has "extremely pro-Russian oriented loyalists" within the ruling SNS, whose "17.000 members swore a blood oath" to defend his regime, and are determined to fight what he referred to as a "West-backed 'colour revolution' in Serbia". He revealed that his brother is amongst those members.
