= Vučević =

Vučević (Serbian Cyrillic: Вучевић) is a South Slavic surname. Notable people with the surname include:

- Borislav Vučević (born 1958), Montenegrin basketball player
- Goran Vučević (born 1971), Croatian footballer
- Nikola Vučević (born 1990), Montenegrin basketball player
- Miloš Vučević (born 1974), Serbian politician
