= Aleksandar Vučić =

President of Serbia from 2017 to 2026

- Александар Вучић
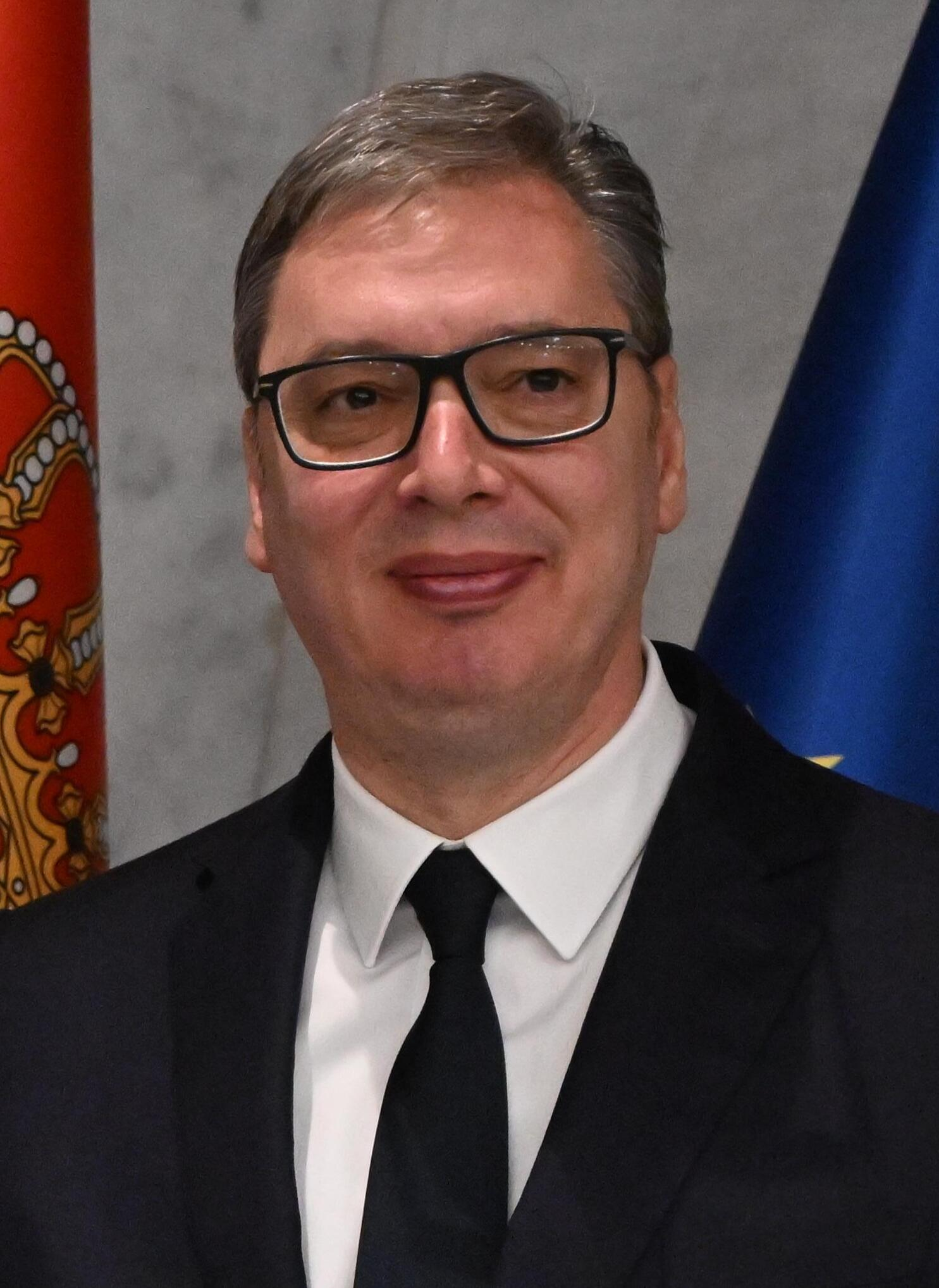
- Vučić in 2025

Member of the National Assembly
- Incumbent
- Assumed office 17 November 2026

President of Serbia
- In office 31 May 2017 – 27 September 2026
- Prime Minister: Ivica Dačić (acting); Ana Brnabić; Ivica Dačić (acting); Miloš Vučević; Đuro Macut
- Preceded by: Tomislav Nikolić
- Succeeded by: Ana Brnabić (acting)

Prime Minister of Serbia
- In office 27 April 2014 – 31 May 2017
- President: Tomislav Nikolić
- Deputy: Ivica Dačić; Rasim Ljajić; Zorana Mihajlović; Kori Udovički; Nebojša Stefanović
- Preceded by: Ivica Dačić
- Succeeded by: Ivica Dačić (acting); Ana Brnabić

First Deputy Prime Minister of Serbia
- In office 27 July 2012 – 27 April 2014
- Prime Minister: Ivica Dačić
- Preceded by: Ivica Dačić
- Succeeded by: Ivica Dačić

Minister of Defence
- In office 27 July 2012 – 2 September 2013
- Prime Minister: Ivica Dačić
- Preceded by: Dragan Šutanovac
- Succeeded by: Nebojša Rodić

President of the Serbian Progressive Party
- In office 24 May 2012 – 27 May 2023
- Preceded by: Tomislav Nikolić
- Succeeded by: Miloš Vučević

Minister of Information
- In office 24 March 1998 – 24 October 2000
- Prime Minister: Mirko Marjanović
- Preceded by: Radmila Milentijević
- Succeeded by: Ivica Dačić; Biserka Matić Spasojević; Bogoljub Pejčić

Personal details
- Born: 5 March 1970 (age 56) Belgrade, SR Serbia, SFR Yugoslavia
- Party: SNS (since 2008)
- Other political affiliations: SRS (1993–2008); Movement for the People and the State (since 2025)
- Spouses: Ksenija Janković (m. 1997; div. 2011) Tamara Đukanović (m. 2013)
- Children: 3
- Relatives: Andrej Vučić (brother)
- Education: University of Belgrade
- Website: vucic.rs

Aleksandar Vučić (Note: Serbian: Александар Вучић, pronounced [aleksǎːndar vǔtʃitɕ]) (Note: Some media anglicize "Aleksandar" as "Alexander".) (born 5 March 1970) is a Serbian politician who led Serbia as prime minister from 2014 to 2017 and as president from 2017 to 2026. A founding member of the Serbian Progressive Party (SNS), he was its president from 2012 to 2023 and has since been described as its de facto leader. He served as first deputy prime minister from 2012 to 2014; after he became prime minister, he and the SNS gradually consolidated control over the country's politics, a period associated with Serbia's democratic backsliding. His rule ended when his list lost to the Student List in the 2026 parliamentary election; since November 2026 he has been an opposition member of the National Assembly.

Born in Belgrade, Vučić graduated in law from the Faculty of Law of University of Belgrade. Vučić began his political career in 1993 as a member of the far-right Serbian Radical Party (SRS) in the National Assembly of Serbia. In 1995, he became the secretary-general of SRS. He was appointed minister of information in 1998 in the government of Mirko Marjanović. During his tenure as minister, which lasted until the overthrow of Slobodan Milošević in 2000, Vučić introduced restrictive measures against journalists and banned foreign TV networks. After 2000, he was one of the most prominent figures in the Serbian opposition. Together with Tomislav Nikolić, Vučić left SRS and co-founded SNS in 2008, initially serving as its deputy president. SNS became the largest party in the 2012 election and formed a government with the Socialist Party of Serbia. Vučić was appointed first deputy prime minister and elected president of SNS.

Although he was not prime minister, Vučić was regarded as the most powerful figure in the government as leader of its largest party. He was one of the crucial figures in cooperation and European Union (EU)-mediated dialogue between the governments of Kosovo and Serbia, advocating the implementation of the Brussels Agreement on the normalization of their relations. Vučić became prime minister in 2014, leading to the establishment of a dominant-party system. He continued Serbia's accession process to the EU, privatizing state-owned businesses and liberalizing the economy. In 2015, at an accession conference with a Serbian delegation led by Vučić, the EU opened the first negotiating chapters. In 2017, Vučić was elected president of Serbia. He was re-elected in 2022. In 2026, he resigned as president to lead the SNS list "Aleksandar Vučić – United Serbia" as its candidate for prime minister in the 2026 Serbian parliamentary election. His list lost to the Student List, which won an absolute majority of seats, and Vučić conceded defeat on election night.

During his tenure as president, Vučić initiated Open Balkan, an economic zone of Balkan countries intended to guarantee "four freedoms", and signed an agreement in September 2020 to normalize economic relations with Kosovo. A populist politician, Vučić has supported Serbia's accession to the EU while seeking to maintain close relations with Russia and China. Observers have described Vučić's rule as an authoritarian, autocratic or illiberal regime, citing curtailed press freedom and a decline in civil liberties. Supporters of Vučić's administration highlight economic growth and the pursuit of pragmatic and balanced policies.

== Early life and education ==
Vučić was born on 5 March 1970 in Belgrade, SR Serbia, Yugoslavia, to Anđelko Vučić and Angelina Milovanov. He has a younger brother, Andrej.

His paternal family originates from the area of Bugojno in Central Bosnia. According to Vučić, the family lived in the village of Čipuljić until it was expelled by the Ustaše during World War II, after which it settled near Belgrade, where his father was born; he has also said that his paternal grandfather Anđelko and dozens of other relatives were killed by the Ustaše. The Croatian daily Jutarnji list disputed this, reporting that none of his relatives had been killed during the war, which Vučić called "brutal lies and attacks on his family". His mother was born in Bečej, Vojvodina. Both of his parents were economics graduates; his father worked as an economist and his mother as a journalist.

Vučić was raised in the Blokovi neighbourhood of New Belgrade, where he attended the Branko Radičević Elementary School and later a gymnasium in Zemun. He graduated from the University of Belgrade Faculty of Law in 1994.

He learned English in Brighton, England, and worked as a merchant in London for more than a year. After returning to Yugoslavia, he worked as a journalist in Pale, SR Bosnia and Herzegovina. There, he interviewed politician Radovan Karadžić and once played chess with general Ratko Mladić. As a youngster, Vučić was a fan of Red Star Belgrade, often attending their matches, including the one played between Dinamo Zagreb and Red Star on 13 May 1990, which turned into a huge riot. The homes of his relatives were destroyed in the Bosnian War.

== Political career ==
Vučić joined the Serbian Radical Party (SRS) in 1993, a far-right party whose core ideology is based on Serbian nationalism and the goal of creating a Greater Serbia, and was elected to the National Assembly following the 1993 parliamentary election. During the Bosnian War, Vučić visited Army of Republika Srpska positions during the siege of Sarajevo. Photographs and video footage from the period have been the subject of controversy, including recordings from the Pale area showing him carrying what critics identify as a rifle; Vučić has disputed these interpretations, at one point claiming the object was an umbrella and later a camera tripod, or that the photos and videos have been AI manipulated. Since 2025, he has also faced allegations linking him to the Sarajevo Safari, involving claims that foreign visitors paid to shoot at civilians during the siege. Vučić has denied any involvement.

After his party won the local elections in Zemun in 1996, he became the director of Pinki Hall.

=== Minister of Information (1998–2000) ===
In March 1998, Vučić was appointed Minister of Information in the government of Mirko Marjanović. Scholars described Vučić as the crucial figure in the shaping of turn-of-the century media policies in Serbia. Following rising resentment against Milošević, Vučić introduced fines for journalists who criticized the government and banned foreign TV networks. In 2016, he said that he had been wrong and had changed, stating "I was not ashamed to confess all my political mistakes".

During this period, Serbian media were accused of broadcasting Serbian nationalist propaganda, which demonized ethnic minorities and legitimized Serb atrocities against them. In 1998, the government adopted what was described as the most restrictive media law in Europe at the end of the 20th century; it created a special misdemeanor court to try violations, which could impose heavy fines and to confiscate property if they were not immediately paid. Serbian media were under severe state repression, and foreign media were treated as "foreign elements" and "spies". Human Rights Watch reported that five independent newspaper editors were charged with disseminating misinformation because they referred to Albanians who had died in Kosovo as "people" rather than "terrorists". The government crackdown on independent media intensified when NATO forces were threatening intervention in Kosovo in late September and early October 1998. The government also maintained direct control of state radio and television, which provided news for the majority of the population. After the NATO bombing of Yugoslavia began in March 1999, Vučić called for a meeting of all Belgrade's editors. Print media were ordered to submit all copies to the ministry for approval and were allowed to publish only official statements and information taken from outlets that were either state-controlled or practiced radical self-censorship. Vučić also ordered journalists from all NATO countries to leave the country.

=== Radical Party to Progressive Party ===
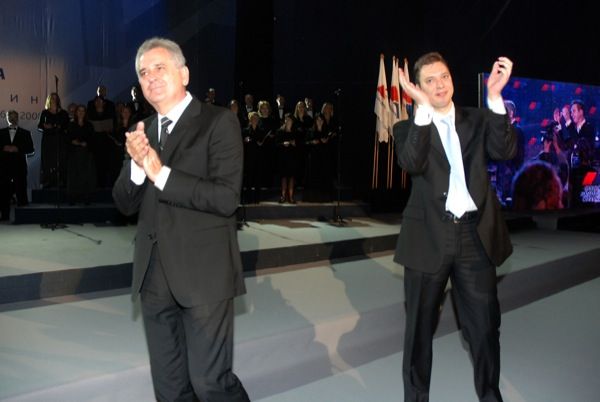
Vučić and Tomislav Nikolić on the founding congress of the Serbian Progressive Party, Belgrade, 2008

Tomislav Nikolić, deputy leader of the Radical Party and de facto interim leader due to the absence of Vojislav Šešelj, resigned on 6 September 2008 because of disagreement with Šešelj over the party's support for Serbia's EU membership. With some other well-known Radical Party members he formed a new parliamentary club called "Napred Srbijo!" (Forward Serbia!). On 12 September 2008, Nikolić and his group were officially ejected from the Radical Party on the session of SRS leadership. Vučić, as secretary-general, was called to attend this session, but did not appear. Nikolić announced that he would form his own party and invited Vučić to join. Vučić, one of the most popular figures among SRS supporters, resigned from the Radical Party on 14 September 2008. The next day, Vučić announced his temporary withdrawal from politics.

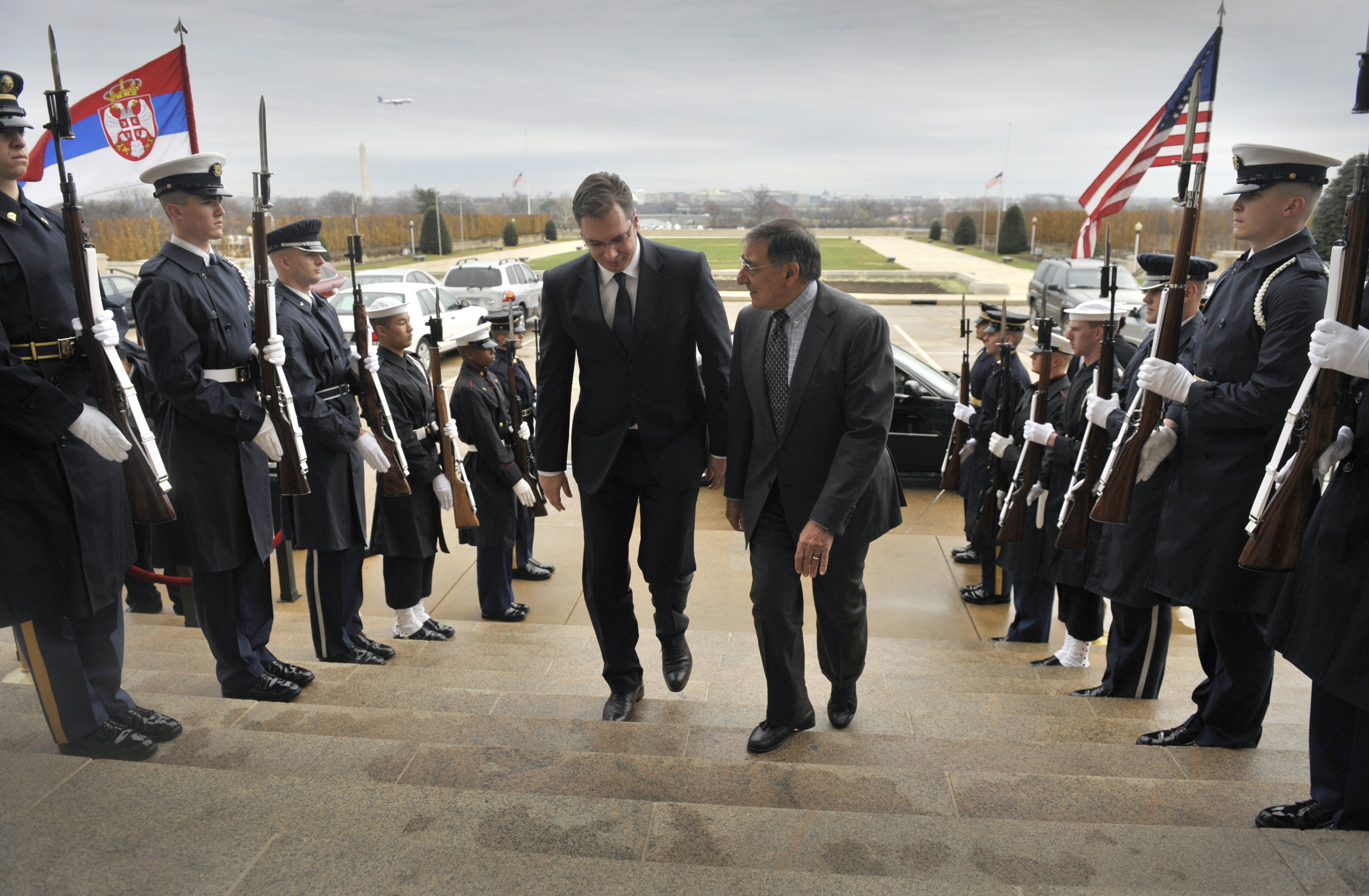
Vučić and U.S. secretary of defense Leon Panetta in Washington, D.C. in 2012

On 6 October 2008, Vučić confirmed in a TV interview that he was to join the newly formed Nikolić's Serbian Progressive Party (SNS) and that he would be the Deputy President of the party. He subsequently distanced himself from his earlier positions. In 2010, he said that a "horrible crime was committed in Srebrenica" and that he felt "ashamed" of the Serbs who committed it. "I do not hide that I have changed... I am proud of that." he told AFP in an interview in 2012. "I was wrong, I thought I was doing the best for my country, but I saw the results and we failed, We need to admit that."

=== Minister of Defence and First Deputy Prime Minister (2012–2014) ===
Vučić served as first deputy prime minister from July 2012 to April 2014, and as minister of defence from July 2012 until September 2013, when he left the defence ministry in a cabinet reshuffle. Although the prime minister, Ivica Dačić, held formal power as head of government, many analysts thought that Vučić had the most influence in government as head of the largest party in the governing coalition and parliament.

=== Prime Minister (2014–2017) ===
==== 2014 parliamentary election ====
In the 2014 parliamentary election, the SNS-led coalition won 158 of the 250 seats and formed a government with the Socialist Party of Serbia. Vučić was elected prime minister on 27 April 2014.

==== 2016 parliamentary election ====
In January 2016, at an SNS party conference, Vučić announced an early parliamentary election, saying that he wanted to ensure stable government and the continuation of the country's political direction, including its bid for EU membership. On 4 March 2016, President Tomislav Nikolić dissolved the National Assembly and scheduled an early election for 24 April. The SNS-led coalition won 48.25% of the vote. It retained its majority with 131 seats, 98 of them held by SNS members, fewer than in 2014.

=== 2017 presidential election ===
Vučić announced his candidacy in the presidential election on 14 February 2017, despite earlier statements that he would not run. According to the Constitution, Serbia is a parliamentary republic in which the presidency is largely ceremonial with no significant executive power.

After initial speculation that the incumbent president, Tomislav Nikolić, would also run, Nikolić backed Vučić. Vučić won in the first round with 56.01% of the vote; the independent candidate Saša Janković was second with 16.63%, ahead of satirical politician Luka Maksimović and former minister of foreign affairs Vuk Jeremić.

A public opinion survey, carried out by CeSID, found that pensioners made up a large share (41%) of Vučić's voters, that most of them (63%) had completed secondary education, and that 21% had not.

=== President (2017–2026) ===
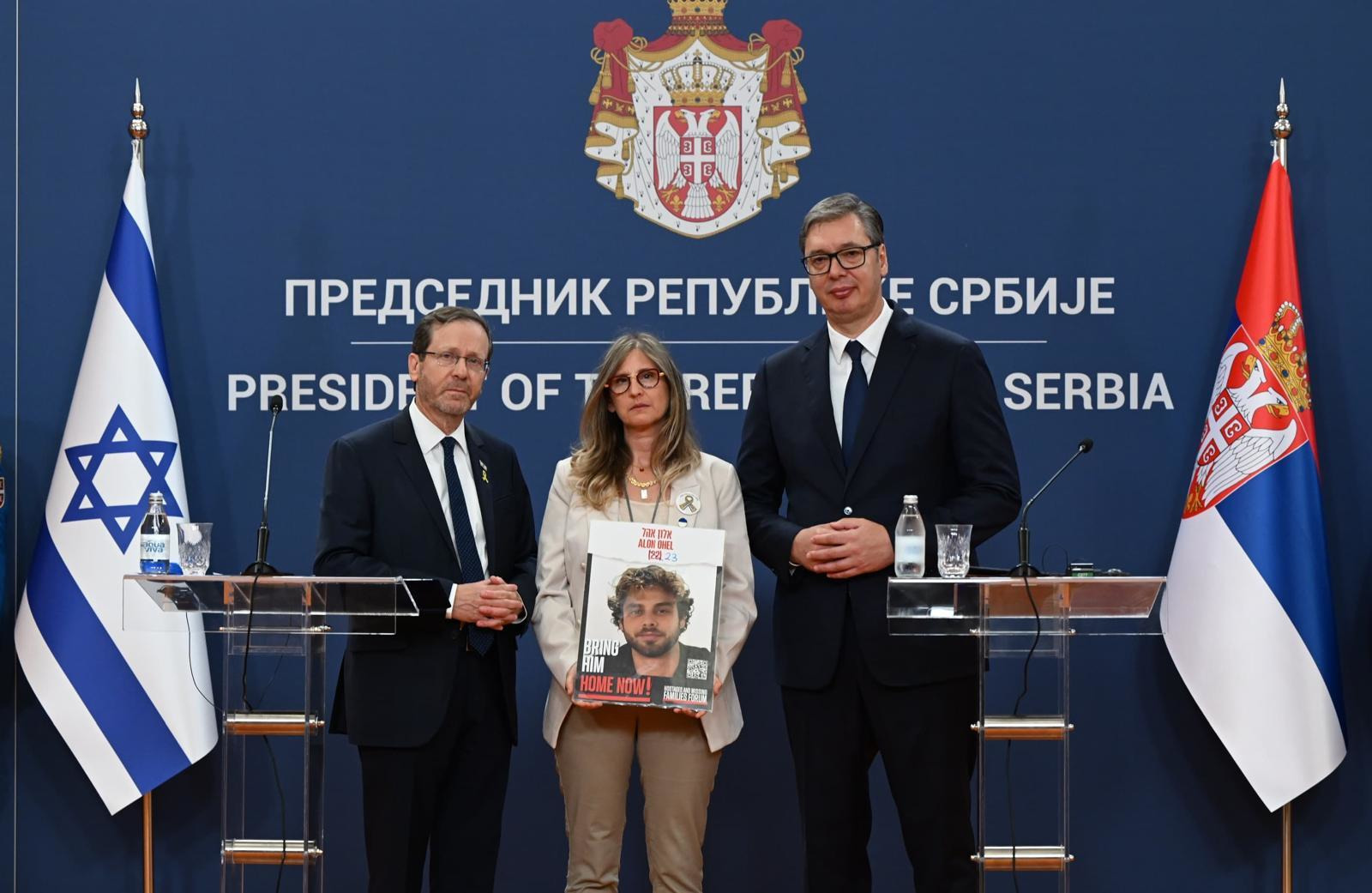
President of Israel, Isaac Herzog, Aleksandar Vučić, and Idit Ohel, the mother of the abductee to Gaza, Alon Ohel, on 11 September 2024

The election result sparked protests around Serbia. Thousands of protesters accused Vučić of leading the country towards authoritarianism. Protesters organized the rallies through social media, insisted that they were not linked to any party or politician, and demanded a total overhaul of what they called "corrupt political, business and media systems that serve an elite led by Mr Vučić". Vučić said that the protests were organized by his political opponents who, he said, expected "the dictator would bring the police into the streets."

Vučić was sworn in as president before the National Assembly on 31 May 2017. He promised to continue reforms and said that Serbia would remain on a European path. He also said that Serbia would maintain military neutrality and continue to build partnerships with both NATO and Russia.

After becoming president, Vučić replaced the police unit traditionally responsible for the president's protection with members of the Cobras, a military police unit that, contrary to the law, had also protected him as prime minister from 2014 to 2017.

During late 2018 and early 2019, thousands of Serbs took to the streets to protest the presidency of Vučić. The protesters accused Vučić and the SNS of corruption and said that Vučić was trying to cement himself as an autocrat, which he denied. In 2019, Freedom House's report downgraded Serbia's status from Free to Partly Free due to the deterioration in the conduct of elections, continued attempts by the government and allied media outlets to undermine independent journalists through legal harassment and smear campaigns, and Vučić's accumulation of executive powers that conflict with his constitutional role.

After Vučić's announcement of the reintroduction of lockdown in July 2020 due to the COVID-19 pandemic, thousands of people protested, accusing the government of missteps in its handling of the pandemic, including prematurely lifting restrictions and downplaying the risks in order to hold the elections. Some analysts said they had not seen such police brutality since the rule of Slobodan Milošević.

According to Amnesty International's annual report covering 2020, Vučić's mandate was characterized by human rights violations, restrictions on freedom of expression and campaigns of harassment against the opposition figures, journalists and media outlets.

Vučić ran for re-election as the SNS candidate in the 2022 general election and won in the first round with 60.01% of the vote, securing a second term. Vučić announced the formation of the People's Movement for the State in March 2023; it was registered as the Movement for the People and the State on 28 March 2025.

Following the Belgrade school shooting and Mladenovac and Smederevo shootings in May 2023, large-scale anti-government protests took place against Vučić's rule. As a result, Vučić promised that early parliamentary elections would be held before the end of the year. On 27 May 2023, Vučić stepped down as president of the SNS and was succeeded by Miloš Vučević; he has nevertheless continued to be described as the party's de facto leader.

On 1 November 2024, the concrete canopy of the main railway station in Novi Sad collapsed onto the busy pavement below, killing 16 people. The collapse spawned a series of mass protests in Novi Sad, which then spread throughout Serbia, fueled by dissatisfaction with other issues including government corruption and media censorship. Vučić dismissed the protesters as "terrorists".

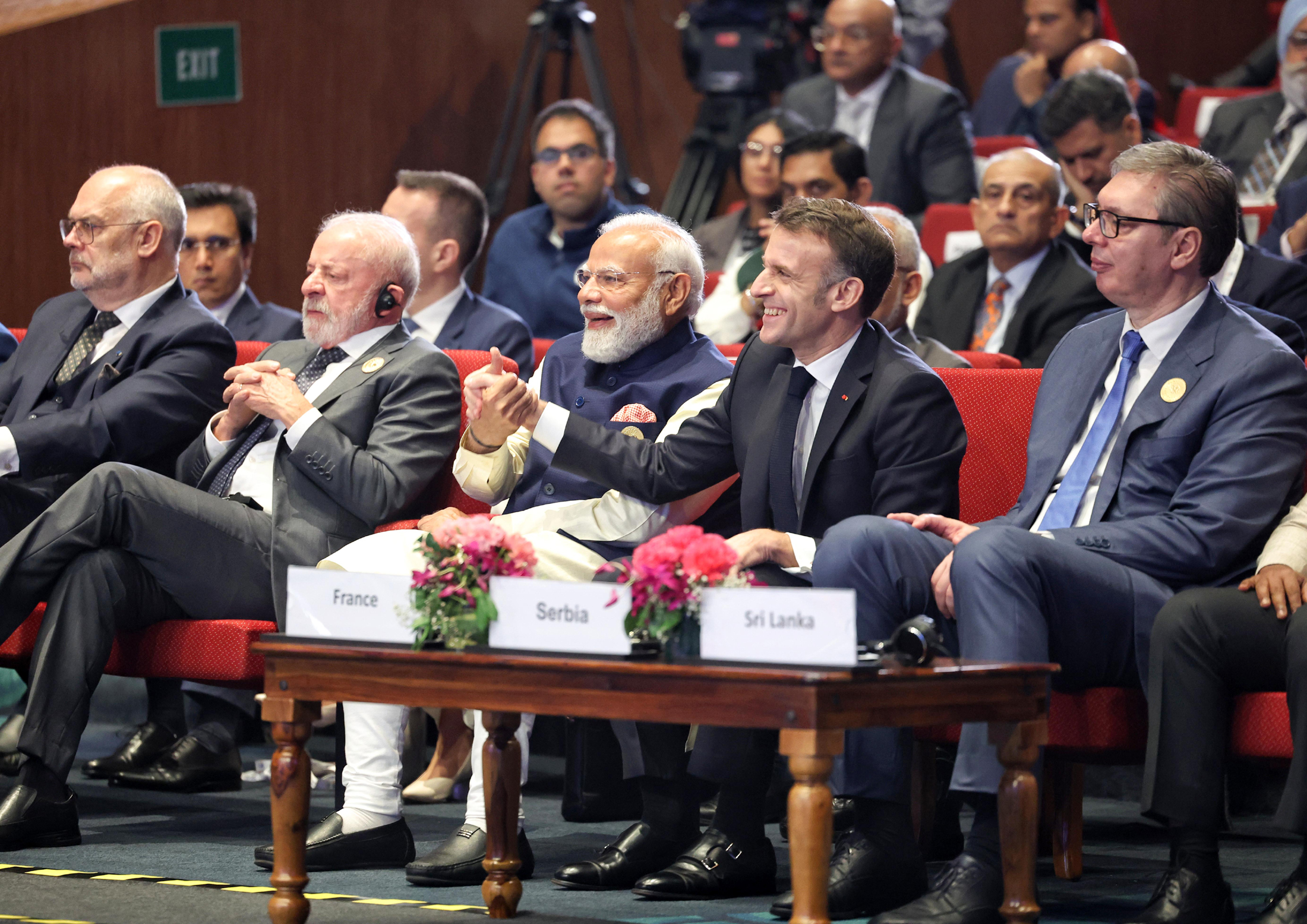
Vučić at the AI Impact Summit in New Delhi in 2026, with Narendra Modi, Emmanuel Macron, Luiz Inácio Lula da Silva and other leaders

In June 2026, after a year and a half of student-led protests against the government, Vučić announced that he would resign within weeks. He resigned on 27 September 2026, during the campaign for the parliamentary election, and on the following day Ana Brnabić, the president of the National Assembly, took over as acting president.

=== 2026 parliamentary election ===
On 5 September 2026, SNS unanimously nominated Vučić, then still president, as its candidate for prime minister and the head of its electoral list, "Aleksandar Vučić – United Serbia". On 9 September, following a proposal from the government, he dissolved the National Assembly and called the election for 25 October. Euractiv reported that the campaign was likely to become not only a referendum on Vučić's rule, but also a test of Serbia's political direction and its increasingly strained relationship with the EU.

Vučić headed the list as its ballot carrier and first candidate while still serving as president, and remained in office during the first weeks of the campaign. Critics argued that this gave the ruling coalition an unjustified advantage; on 16 September, the Republic Electoral Commission (RIK) rejected four complaints, including one arguing that the list should not have been proclaimed because it bore the name of the sitting president. Vučić said that the law did not require him to resign, but that he did not want to campaign for prime minister while president, and that he would tour Serbia as an "ordinary citizen". He scheduled his resignation for after the United Nations General Assembly in New York, where he gave what he described as his last speech at the UN as president, and confirmed from New York on 24 September that he would resign on 27 September. Political scientist Eric Gordy argued that he intended to remain in control after resigning.

United Serbia lost the election to the Student List. According to the final results announced by the Republic Electoral Commission, the Student List won 2,354,417 votes (53.69%) and 140 of the 250 seats, while "Aleksandar Vučić – United Serbia" won 1,731,323 votes (39.48%) and 103 seats. Vučić conceded defeat on election night, saying that "on the basis of a stratified sample, it is clear that we have lost these elections". He said that SNS would "show them what opposition is", and that while some businessmen would now leave the party, its structure was "very solid".

At the constitutive session of the newly elected National Assembly on 17 November 2026, Vučić took his seat as a member of parliament and head of the opposition parliamentary group "Aleksandar Vučić – Serbia Is Winning"; he said that he did not intend to serve the full term.

== Policies ==
=== Autocracy and hybrid authoritarianism ===
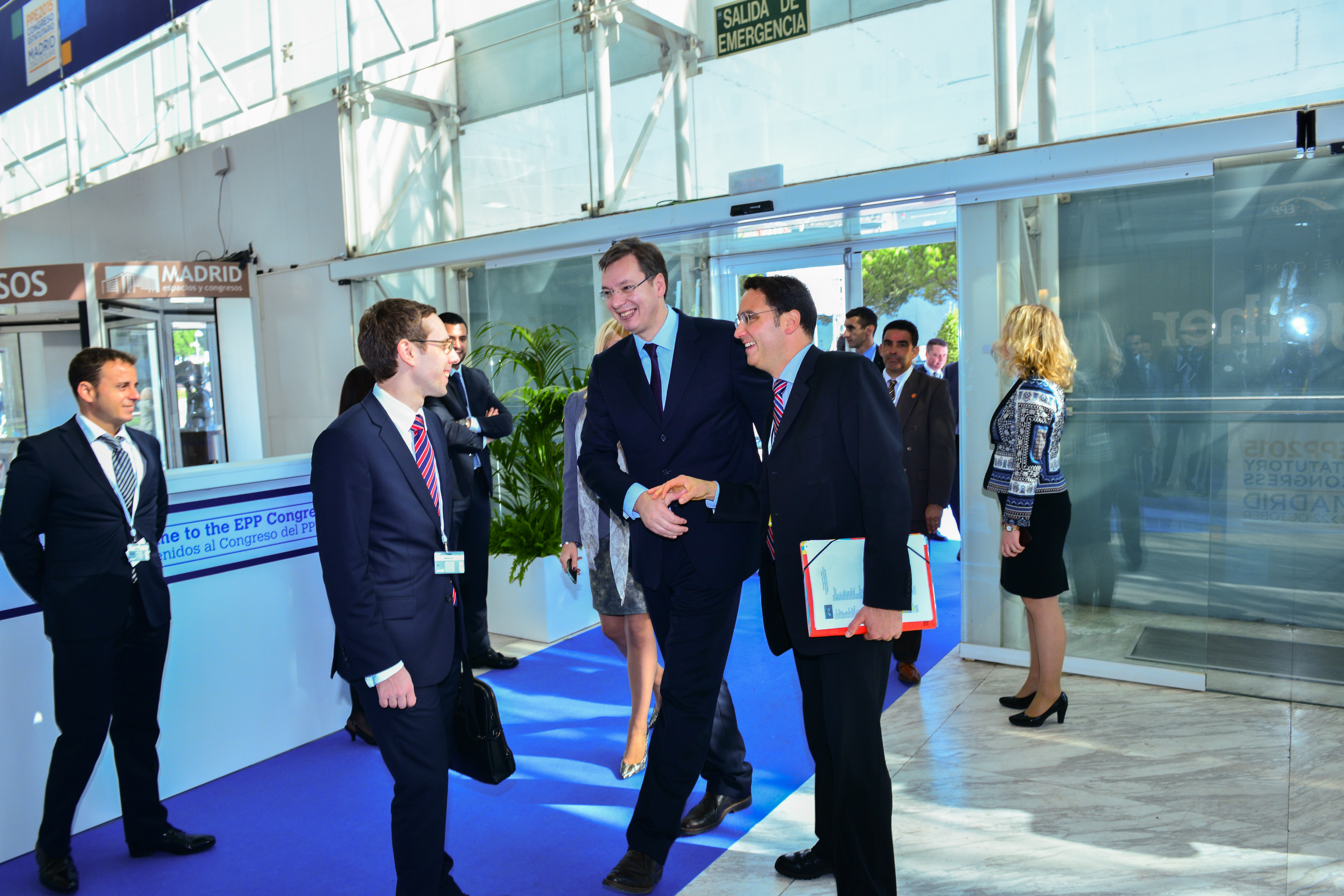
Vučić at the EPP Congress Madrid (2015)

First comparisons of Vučić to other strongmen in European politics and descriptions of him as an autocrat appeared in 2018 and 2019 in academic materials and such outlets as Foreign Policy. Such descriptions have since become more common; by 2026 they were used by outlets such as The Economist, The Washington Post and the Associated Press in a report carried by PBS, which cited political scientist Dejan Pavlovic calling Vučić's rule a "textbook regime" of autocracy, with the ruling party extending its control over the media, judiciary and other institutions. Political scientists have described his regime as a moderate form of competitive authoritarianism that retained civil society institutions and elections. The term illiberal democracy has also been used to describe his regime. Hungarian scholar Mária Bordás also uses the term "illiberal democracy", in the sense of the right-wing authoritarian and nationalist project associated with leaders such as Viktor Orbán of Hungary. Political scientist Dimitri Sotiropoulos describes the SNS as a party with a nationalist profile and anti-democratic populism that cultivated a cult of personality around Vučić and concentrated power over its top-down organization in his hands. According to Sotiropoulos, SNS rule marked Serbia's democratic backsliding and transition to authoritarian rule, and Vučić's populism mobilized supporters against democratic institutions while labeling opponents "foreign agents".

=== Economy ===
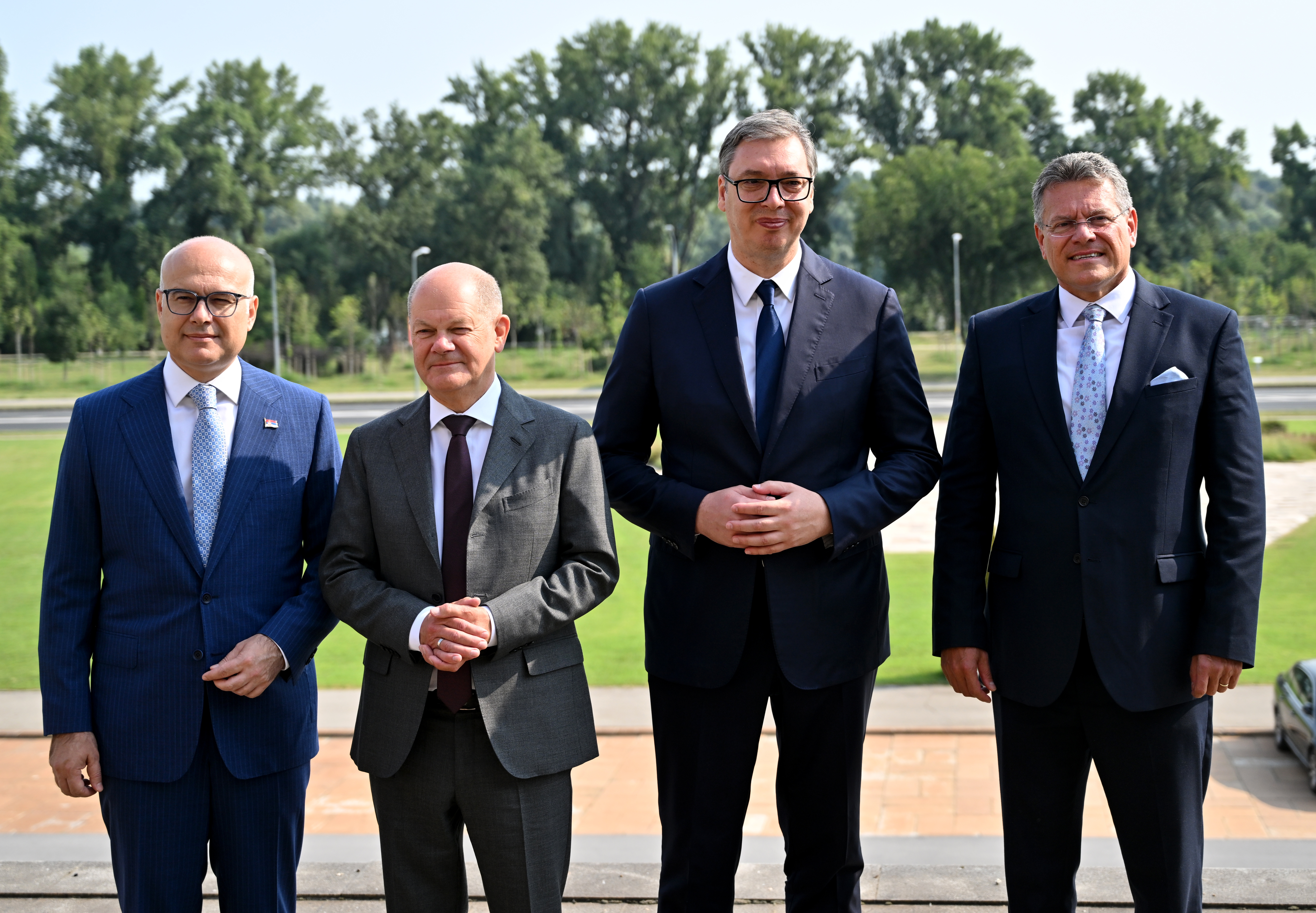
Vučić with Chancellor of Germany, Olaf Scholz, Belgrade, on 19 July 2024

After his election as prime minister in 2014, Vučić promoted austerity-based economic policies, whose aim was to reduce Serbia's budget deficit. Vučić's policy of fiscal consolidation was primarily aimed at cuts in the public sector. One of the measures was the reduction of pensions and salaries in the public sector as well as a ban on further employment in the public sector. On 23 February 2015, Vučić's government concluded a three-year precautionary stand-by arrangement with the IMF worth €1.2 billion to secure the country's long-term fiscal stability. The IMF and the EU praised the reforms, which were described as one of the most successful programs the IMF had ever had. By 2017, Serbia's GDP and average salaries had surpassed their pre-2008-crisis levels. In 2017, GDP growth was expected to rise above 3% and the debt-to-GDP ratio fell below 68%.

=== Corruption and organized crime ===
Vučić has pledged to tackle corruption and organized crime in Serbia. He also vowed to investigate controversial privatizations and ties between tycoons and former government members.

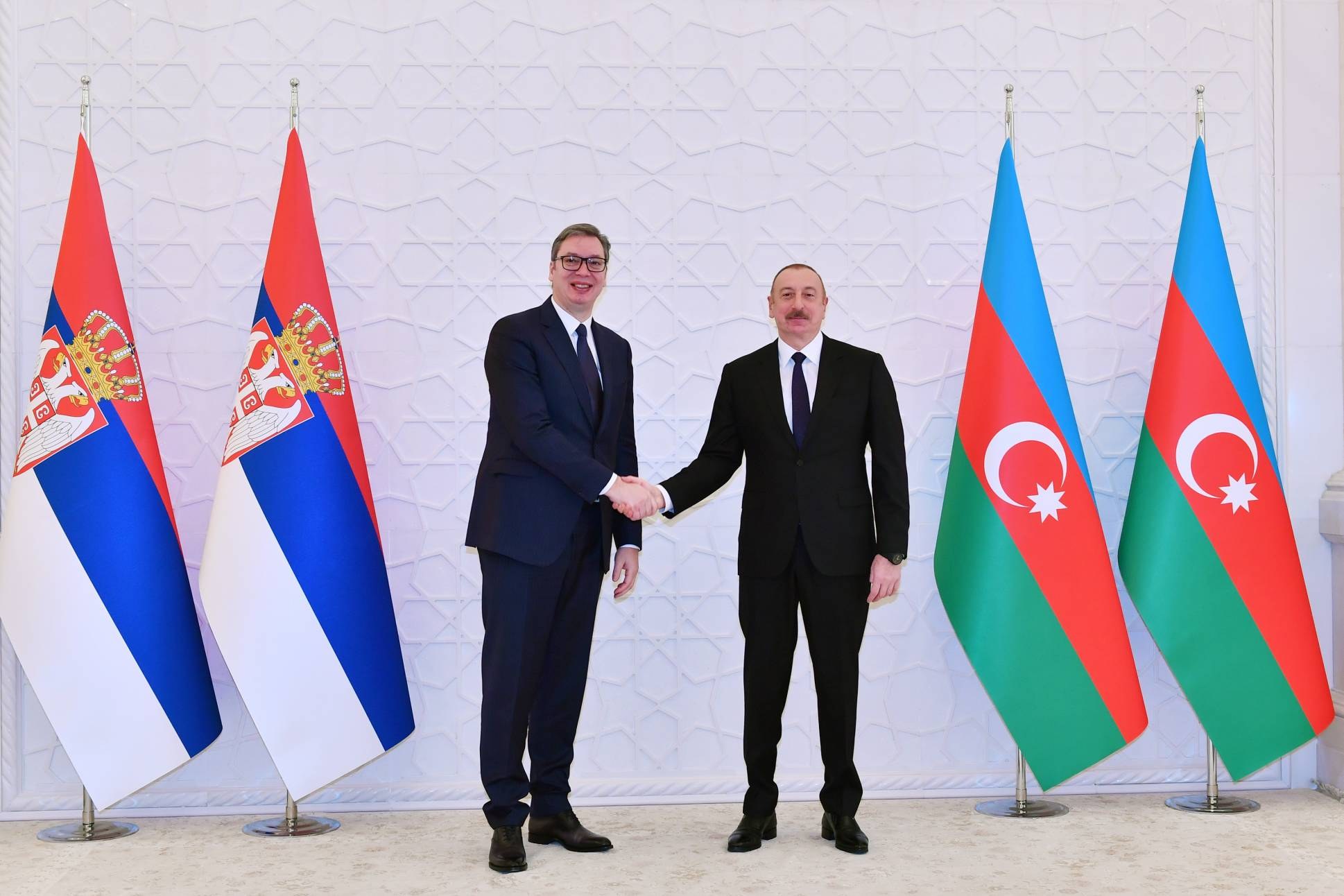
Vučić with President of Azerbaijan, Ilham Aliyev on 21 December 2022

On the other hand, data from the Transparency International showed that a significant increase in perceived corruption was seen exactly from 2012, when Vučić came into power. According to research conducted by the Centre for Investigative Journalism, the battle against corruption in practice comes down to media announcements and arrests in front of cameras. "They are followed by a large number of criminal charges, significantly fewer indictments, and even fewer convictions".

In May 2023, the New York Times published an article by journalist Robert F. Worth which described alleged ties between Vučić and organized crime in Serbia, particularly with the gang leader Veljko Belivuk. It detailed crimes committed by the Belivuk criminal gang and court transcripts in which Belivuk stated he had met Vučić, worked directly under him and provided services such as intimidating political rivals. Vučić called the allegations "lies", saying that the article had been ordered by the CIA months earlier to send him a message and that it was written in Belgrade, accusations which Worth rejected.

=== EU and immigration policy ===
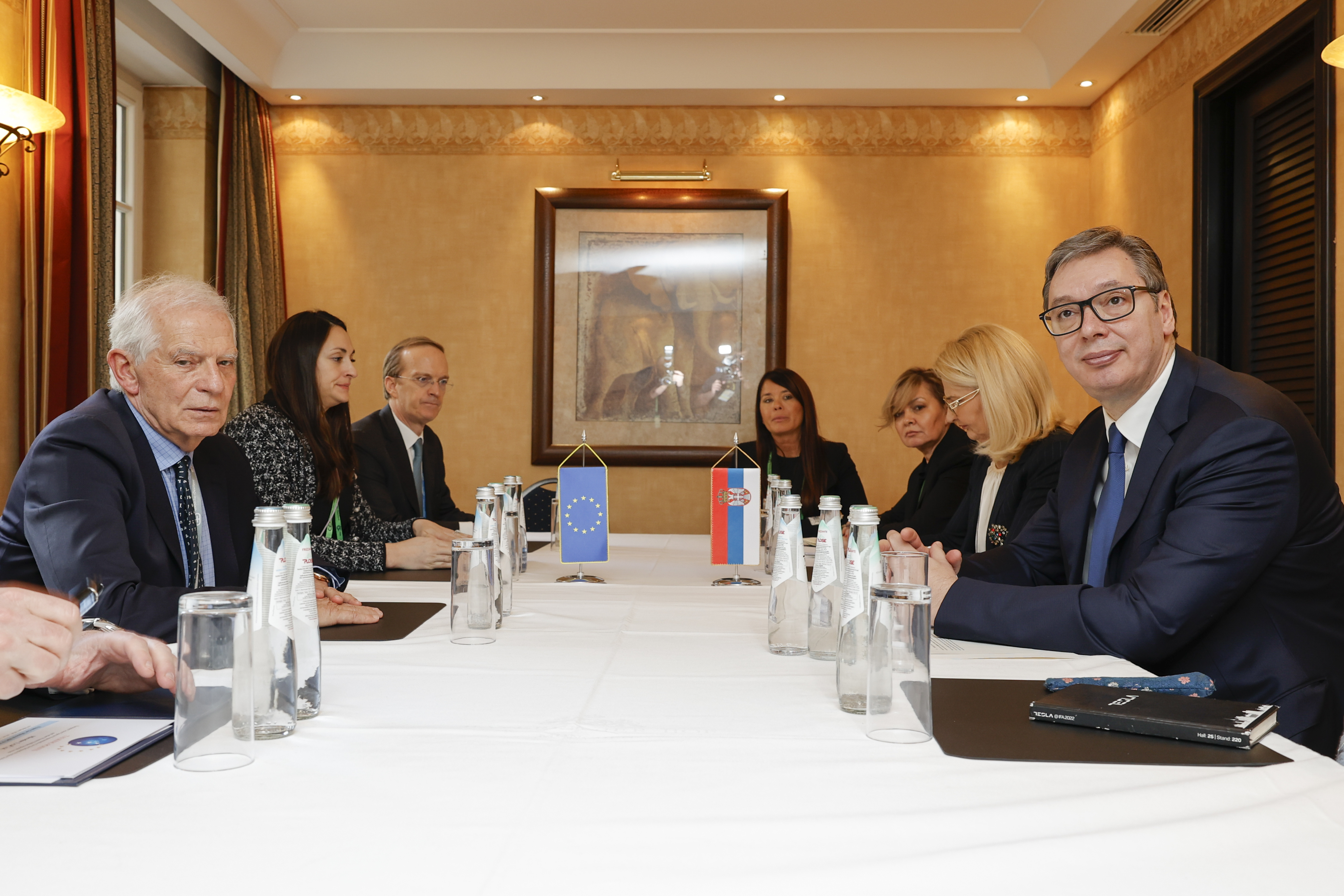
Vučić with European Commission Vice-President Josep Borrell, 17 February 2024

During the 2015–2016 European migrant crisis, Vučić strongly aligned himself with the policies of the German Chancellor, Angela Merkel, and publicly praised German migration policy. Vučić also stated that Serbia will cooperate with the EU in solving the migrant stream going from the Middle East to EU member countries through the Balkan route, and that Serbia will be ready to take some portion of the migrants. "Serbia will receive a certain number of migrants. This makes us more European than some member states. We don't build fences," Vučić wrote on Twitter, while criticizing the migrant policies of some EU member countries.

Vučić opposed Hungary's plan to build the Hungarian border barrier against migrants.

=== EU and lithium ===
During 2021, a series of mass protests erupted in Serbia against the construction of a lithium mine in Western Serbia by the Rio Tinto corporation. In January 2022, the Serbian government revoked licences for the Jadar project. In January 2024, Vučić stated that the government wants to hold further talks with Rio Tinto and that there should be more public discussion over whether the project should go ahead. According to Reuters, the project, if completed, could supply 90% of Europe's lithium needs at the time and help make Rio Tinto a leading lithium producer.

On 19 July 2024, following EU pressure, Vučić hosted German Chancellor Olaf Scholz and European Commission Vice-President Maroš Šefčovič at a summit in Belgrade, where Serbian Minister of Mining and Energy Dubravka Đedović and Šefčovič signed a memorandum of understanding on critical raw materials, battery value chains and electric vehicles, a further step towards reviving the Jadar project. The deal led to renewed environmental protests.

=== Policy towards Kosovo ===
While in opposition before 2012, first as secretary-general of the Serbian Radical Party and from 2008 as deputy president of the newly formed SNS, Vučić was highly critical of the Koštunica and Cvetković governments and promised a "reversal" of the agreements reached by Borko Stefanović and other negotiators. After the SNS-led government was formed in 2012, he said that it "cannot pretend that that [the former administration] was some different state which made the deals".

Vučić was one of the key political figures in the negotiation process on Serbia's bid for EU accession, traveling to Brussels for talks with the EU's High Representative for Foreign Affairs, Baroness Ashton, and to North Mitrovica to discuss the details of a political settlement between the Government of Serbia and the Kosovo authorities. During his visit to North Kosovo, to garner support for the Brussels-brokered deal, he urged Kosovo Serbs to "leave the past and think about the future".

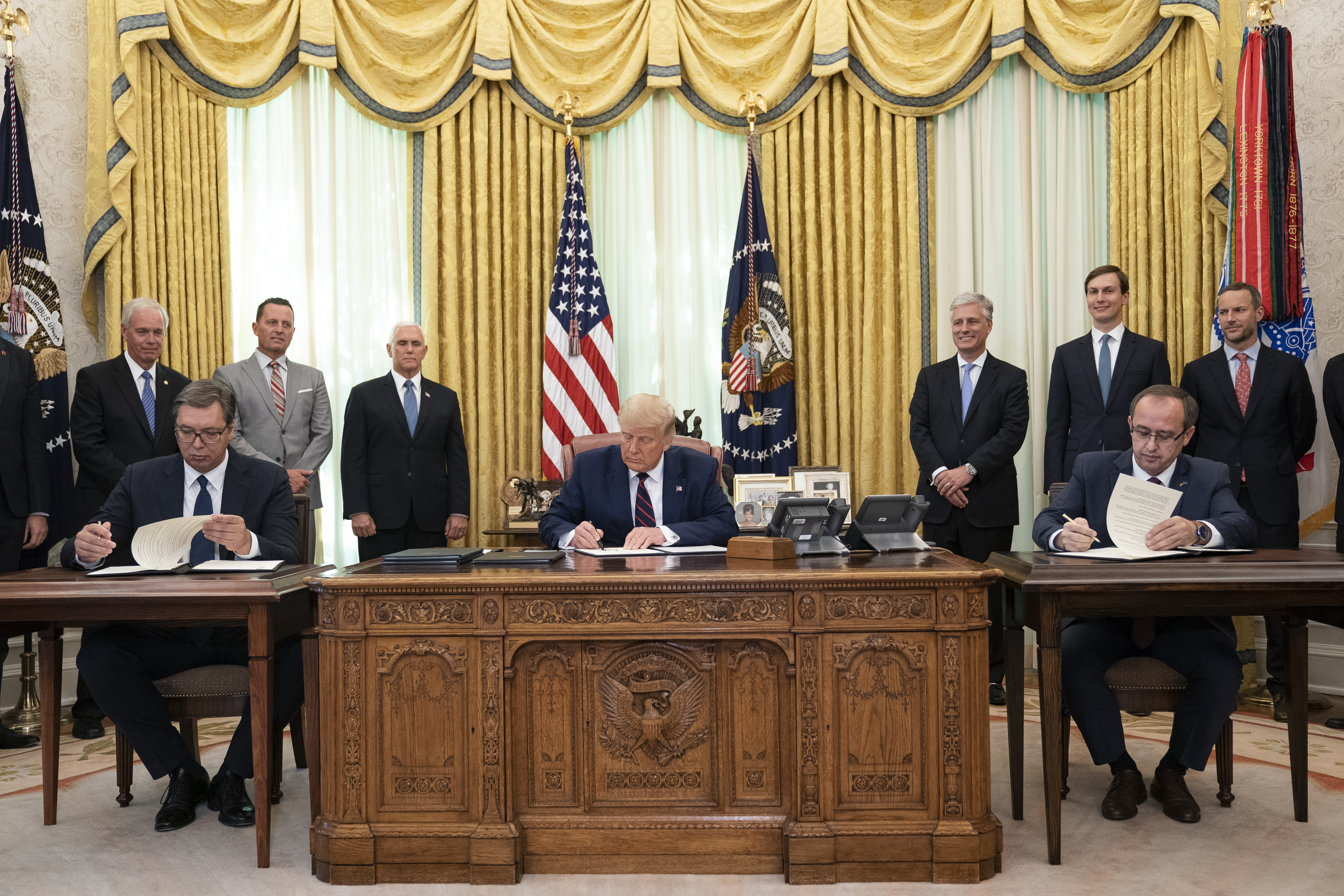
Vučić (left), Donald Trump, President of the United States (middle), and Avdullah Hoti, Prime Minister of Kosovo (right), signing the 2020 Kosovo and Serbia economic agreement in the White House

In 2017, Vučić criticized the EU for "hypocrisy and double standards over its very different attitude towards separatist crises in Kosovo and Catalonia". In September 2018 in a speech to Kosovo Serbs he stated: "Slobodan Milošević was a great Serbian leader, he had the best intentions, but our results were far worse." Journalists reported that Vučić advocated the partition of Kosovo, in what he refers to as "ethnic demarcation with Albanians".

On 27 May 2019, during a special session of the Serbian parliament on Kosovo, Vučić said: "We need to recognize that we have been defeated... We lost the territory." while also criticizing the 'unprincipled attitude of great powers' and "no one reacting to announcements for the formation of a Greater Albania". He stated that Serbia no longer controlled Kosovo and that a compromise was needed on the issue through a future referendum in the country. Vučić has close links to the Serb List and urged Kosovo Serbs to vote for it in the 2019 Kosovo election.

On 20 January 2020, Serbia and Kosovo agreed to restore flights between their capitals for the first time in more than two decades. The deal came after months of diplomatic talks by Richard Grenell, the United States ambassador to Germany, who was named special envoy for Serbia-Kosovo relations by President Donald Trump the year before. Vučić welcomed the flights agreement and tweeted his thanks to American diplomats.

On 4 September 2020, Serbia and Kosovo signed an agreement at the White House in Washington D.C., in the presence of US president Donald Trump. In addition to the economic agreement, Serbia agreed to move its Israeli embassy to Jerusalem from Tel Aviv starting in June 2021 and Israel and Kosovo agreed to mutually recognise each other.

=== Open Balkan ===
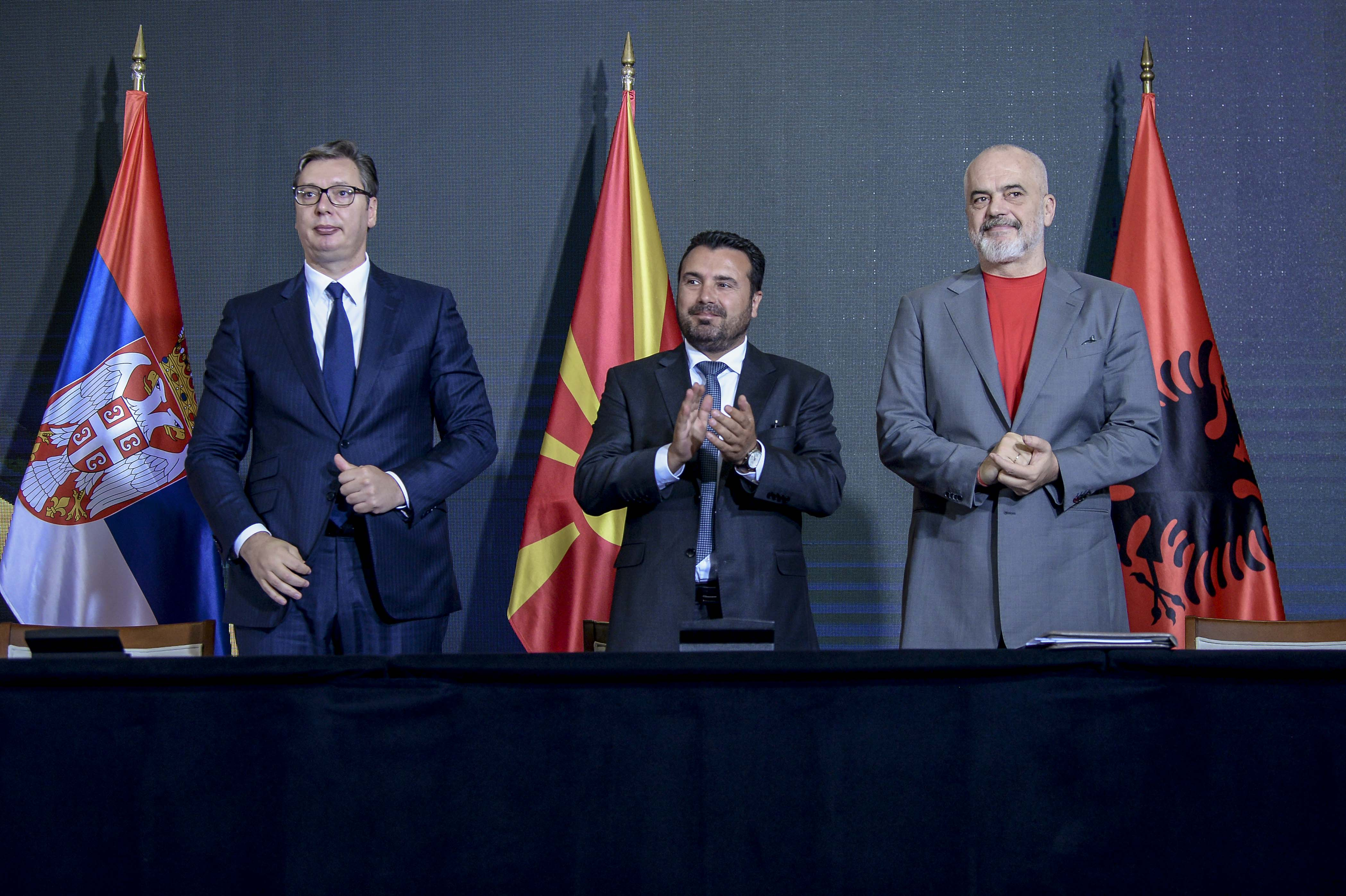
Open Balkan Summit

On 10 October 2019, together with Edi Rama, Prime Minister of Albania, and Zoran Zaev, Prime Minister of North Macedonia, Vučić signed the so-called Mini Schengen (now known as Open Balkan) deal on regional economic cooperation, including on the free movement of goods, capital, services, and labor between their three countries, while they await progress on EU enlargement. A month later, the leaders presented a set of proposals to achieve the "four freedoms" and the first steps towards them, including the possibility of an open border area. In December, the three leaders also met with Milo Đukanović, President of Montenegro, opening the possibility for the country to join the zone. Following the 2020 Kosovo and Serbia economic agreement the two sides pledged to join the Mini Schengen Zone.

=== Relations with Croatia ===
In 2007, Vučić said that the Democratic League of Croats in Vojvodina was a branch of the Croatian Democratic Union. In 2008, with the establishment of the Serbian Progressive Party, Vučić said that the goal of a Greater Serbia taking Croatian territory up to the proposed Virovitica–Karlovac–Karlobag line "is unrealistic and silly".

During 2015 and 2016, relations between Croatia and Serbia were further affected by the ongoing migrant crisis, when Croatia decided to close its border with Serbia. In September 2015, Croatia barred all cargo traffic from Serbia because of the influx of migrants from Serbia, a move that further strained relations between the two countries. In response, Vučić announced countermeasures if no agreement with Croatia was reached. The dispute was eventually resolved through the mediation of the European Commission.

On 31 March 2016, Vojislav Šešelj, leader of the Serbian Radical Party, was acquitted of war crimes charges at first instance by the International Criminal Tribunal for the former Yugoslavia, a verdict that caused controversy in Croatia. Vučić distanced himself from Šešelj and his policies, but said that the verdict should not be used as a tool for political pressure on Serbia.

On 7 April 2016, Croatia refused to endorse the EU Commission opinion to open Chapter 23, a part of Serbia's EU accession negotiations, thus effectively blocking Serbia's EU integration process. Serbia accused Croatia of obstructing its EU membership talks, and Vučić said that his government was "stunned by Croatia's decision not to support Serbia's European path". On 14 April 2016, the EU Commission rejected Croatian arguments in its dispute with Serbia.

On 23 May 2023, Vučić accused Croatia of attempting to topple the government in Serbia.

=== Relations with Russia ===
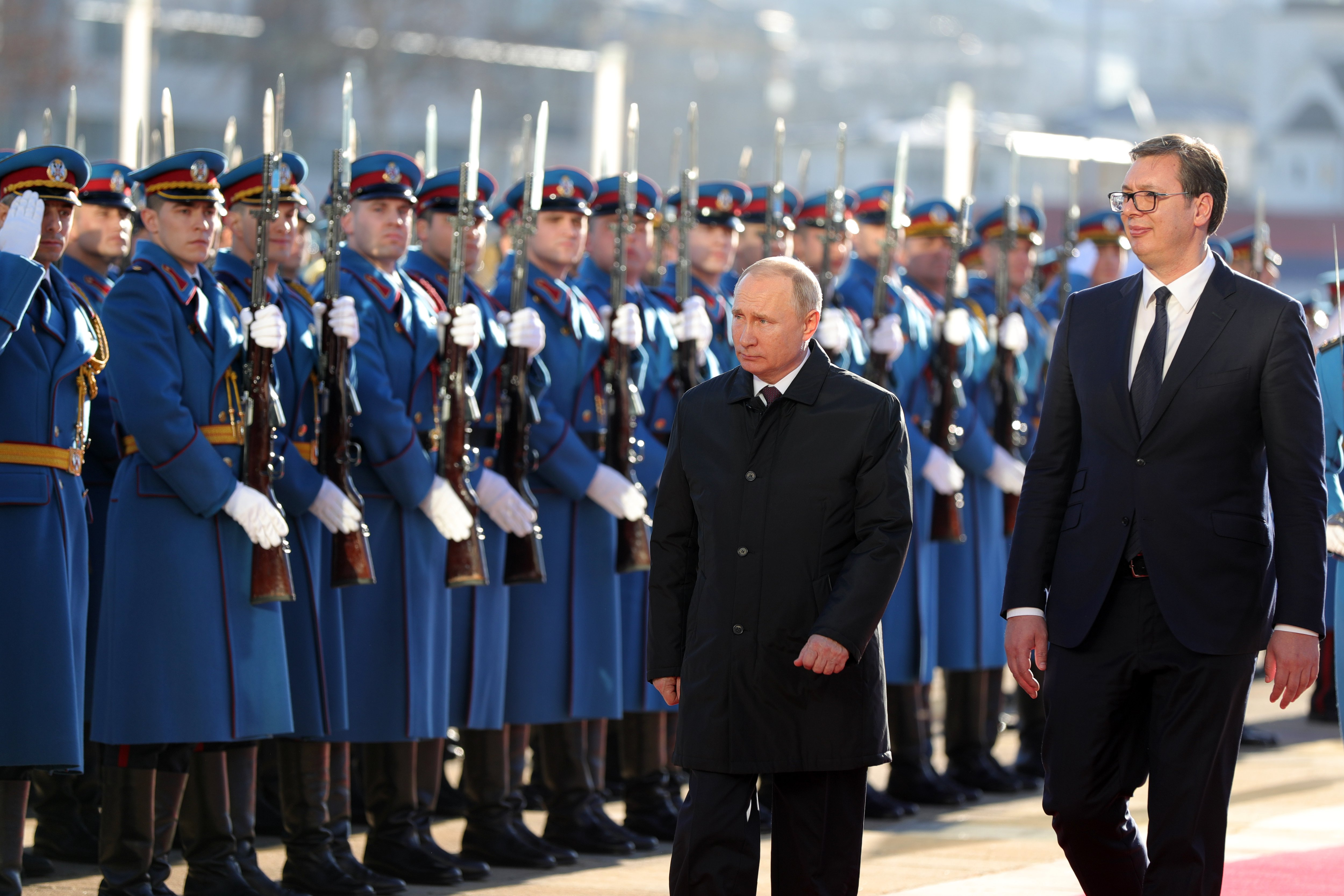
President Vučić with Russian president Vladimir Putin, Belgrade

Vučić maintained Serbia's traditionally good relations with Russia, and his government refused to impose sanctions on Russia after the start of the Russo-Ukrainian war in 2014. He repeatedly said that Serbia would remain committed to European integration while maintaining its historic relations with Russia. "We have proven our sincere and friendly attitude to Russia by being one of the European countries that refused to impose sanctions on Russia," Vučić said after meeting with Russian prime minister Dmitry Medvedev. "Serbia will continue pursuing this policy in the future."

During Vučić's tenure, Serbia continued to expand its economic ties with Russia, especially by increasing Serbian exports to Russia. In early 2016, after a meeting with the Russian deputy prime minister Dmitry Rogozin, Vučić announced the possibility of Serbia boosting its military cooperation with Russia by purchasing Russian missile systems.

In December 2017, Vučić made an official visit to the Russian Federation for the first time as the president of Serbia. He thanked Russia for protecting Serbian national interests and said: "Serbia will never impose sanctions on the Russian Federation (in relation to the international sanctions during the Russo-Ukrainian War)". During his visit, he focused on strengthening cooperation in the field of military industry and energy.

On 25 February 2022, Vučić said Serbia would not impose sanctions against Russia during the Russian invasion of Ukraine.

On 24 February 2024, Croatian foreign minister Gordan Grlić-Radman described Vučić as a Russian "satellite" in the Balkans during an interview on N1, adding that Vučić must decide whether to side with Russia or the European Union "because it is impossible and uncomfortable sitting on two chairs at the same time." Vučić denied the allegation, saying that Grlić-Radman "brutally interferes in the internal affairs of Serbia, but as usual he lies and insults the Serbian people and threatens its citizens." The Serbian foreign ministry issued a note of protest saying that it expected Croatian officials to "refrain from statements that represent interference in the internal affairs of Serbia and will lead a policy of reconciliation and good-neighborly relations between the two states."

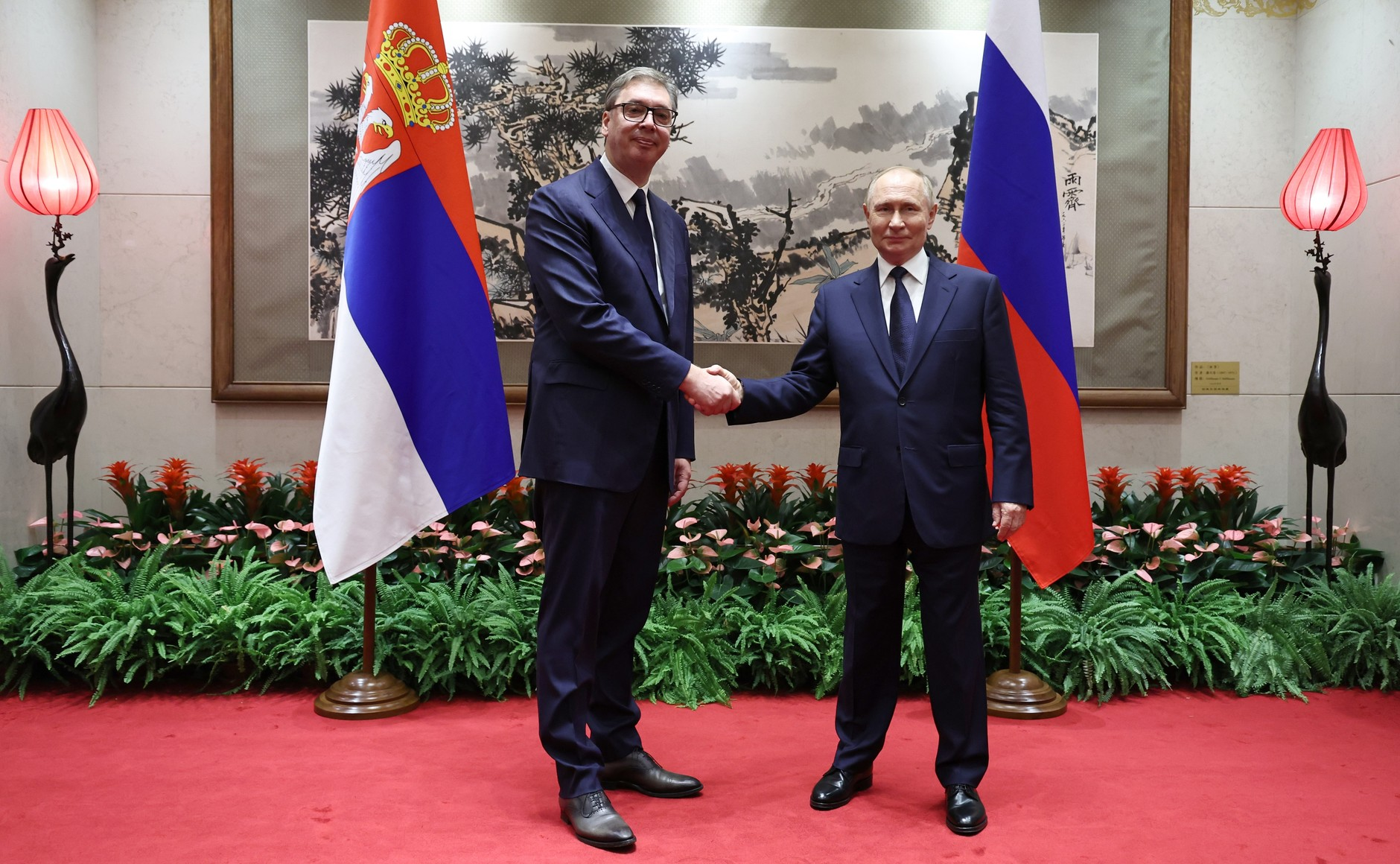
Vučić with Russian President Vladimir Putin, on 2 September 2025

On 24 February 2025, Vučić took responsibility and apologized after Serbia voted in favour of a United Nations General Assembly resolution calling Russia an aggressor state over its invasion of Ukraine. Vučić attributed Serbia's vote to his being "tired" and having "too many things (to deal with)", adding that Serbia was originally slated to abstain.

On 11 June 2025, Vučić made his first visit to Ukraine since the Russian invasion to attend a summit in Odesa hosted by Ukrainian president Volodymyr Zelenskyy. During the visit, Vučić said he supported Ukraine's territorial integrity.

=== Relations with Israel ===
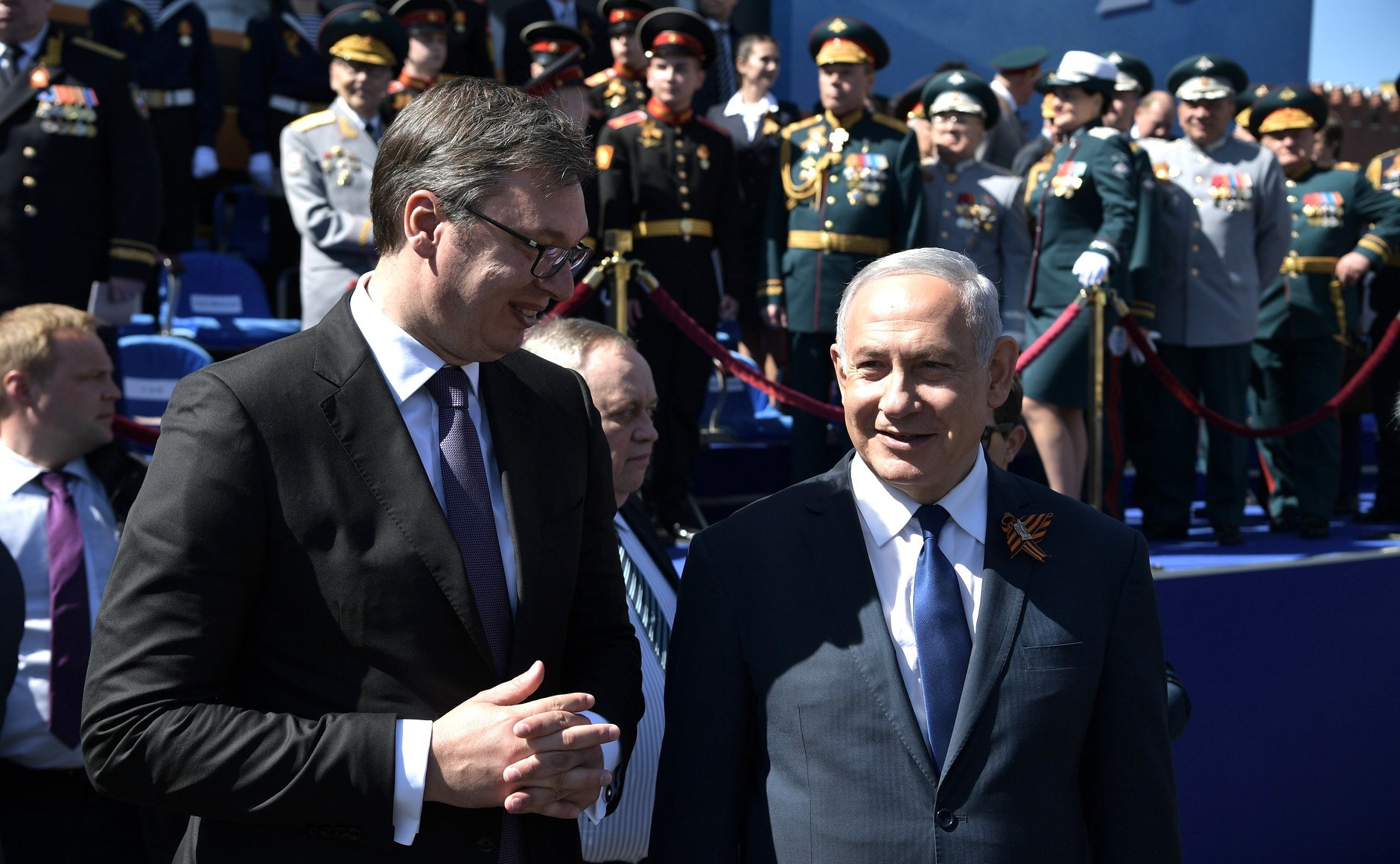
President Aleksandar Vučić with Israeli prime minister Benjamin Netanyahu during the 2018 Moscow Victory Day Parade

Following the October 7 attacks, Vučić condemned the "horrific attacks", adding that "the Jewish people have endured a history of suffering and Israel deserves to live in peace and security". Media reports have suggested Serbia is a major supplier of weapons and ammunition to Israel during the Gaza war, with at least two major shipments sent during the conflict. Serbia's state-owned arms manufacturer, Yugoimport SDPR, exported €42.3 million worth of arms and ammunition to Israel during 2024, mostly 155 mm artillery shells. In September 2024, Israeli President Isaac Herzog visited Serbia, meeting with Vučić in Belgrade.

In June 2025, due to the Twelve-Day War, Vučić announced a halt to arms exports to Israel. This came after Iran warned that providing weapons to Israel would be considered an "act of aggression" against Iran.

In April 2026, BIRN revealed that Serbia was planning to open a drone factory in cooperation with Israeli company Elbit Systems, a company criticized for its role in the Gaza war. Vučić announced the opening of the factory in March, without mentioning the name of the company. The factory was opened in September 2026.

=== Relations with the United States ===
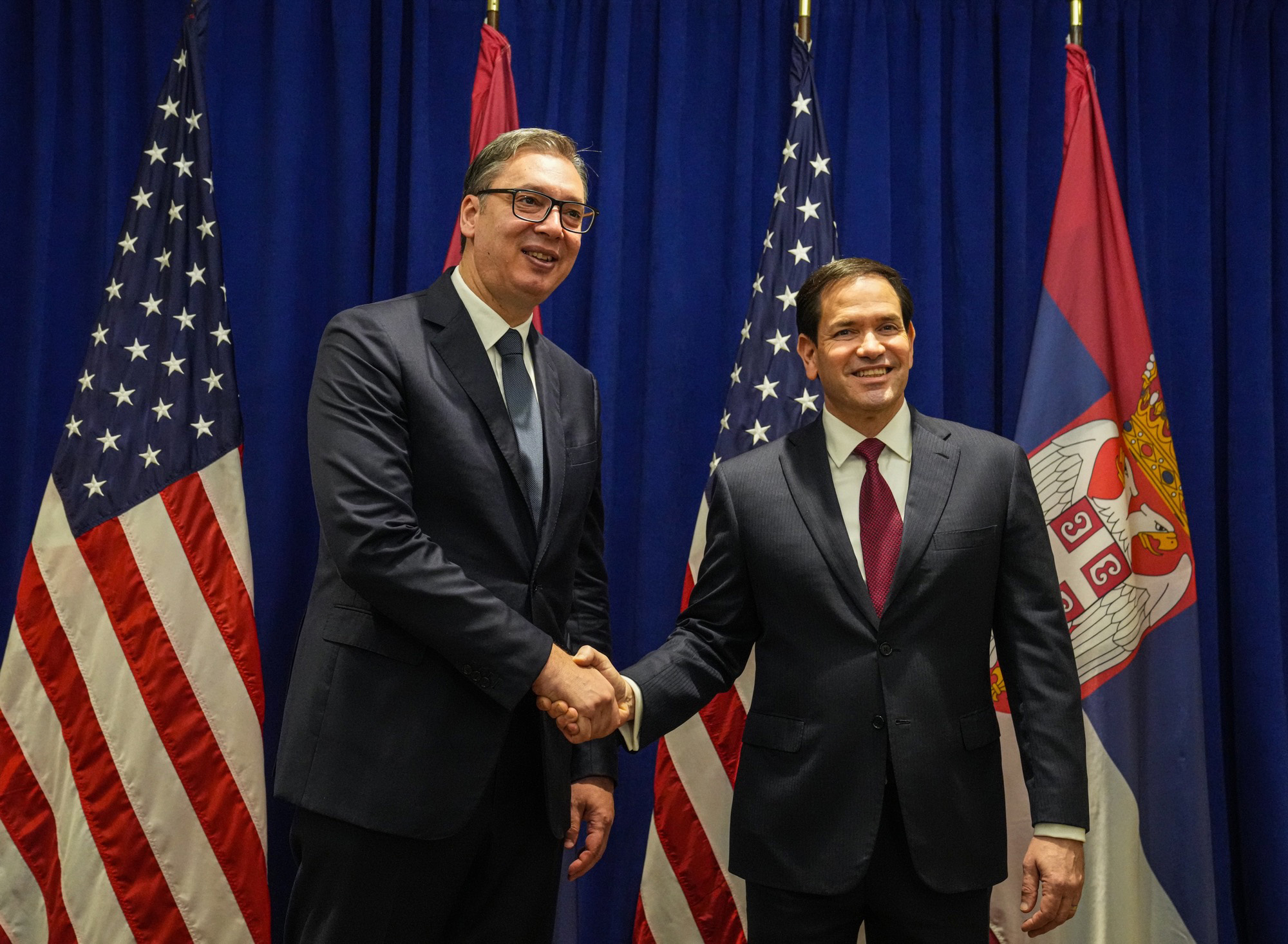
Aleksandar Vučić and Marco Rubio, New York City, New York, 23 September 2025

In July 2017, Vučić visited the United States and met with U.S. vice president Mike Pence, where they discussed U.S. support for Serbia's efforts to join the European Union, the need for continued reforms, and further progress in normalizing the relationship with Kosovo. Referencing the proposed land swap arrangement between Serbia and Kosovo, U.S. national security advisor John Bolton said in August 2018 that the United States would not oppose a territorial exchange between Kosovo and Serbia to resolve their long-running dispute. The U.S. State Department maintained that full normalization of relations between Serbia and Kosovo was "essential for regional stability", a view Vučić had also expressed.

=== Relations with China ===
Vučić has sought closer cooperation with China. He met Chinese president Xi Jinping in 2016, 2018, and 2019. After meeting with Chinese Minister of Foreign Affairs Wang Yi, he secured Chinese help in combating the COVID-19 pandemic in Serbia through delivery of PPE and CoronaVac vaccine doses, which has contributed to Serbia leading COVID-19 vaccination rates in Europe. In October 2023, he signed a free-trade deal with China. During an interview with China Global Television Network in February 2024, Vučić said, "Taiwan is China — and it's up to you what, when and how you're going to do it — full stop".

=== Media ===
In 2014, Dunja Mijatović, OSCE Representative on Freedom of the Media, wrote to Vučić about the suppression of media freedom; he denied this and demanded an apology from the OSCE. According to the 2015 Freedom House report and the 2017 Amnesty International report, media outlets and journalists have been pressured after criticizing the government of Vučić. Serbian media are also heavily dependent on advertising contracts and government subsidies which make journalists and media outlets exposed to economic pressures, such as payment defaults, termination of contracts and the like. Four popular political talk TV programs were canceled in 2014, including the renowned political talk show Utisak nedelje by Olja Bećković, which had been running for 24 years and was well known for its critical scrutiny of all governments since it began. In its first report after Vučić took office, the European Commission expressed concern about deteriorating conditions for the full exercise of freedom of expression. The report noted a growing trend of self-censorship combined with undue influence on editorial policies. Reports published in 2016 and 2018 stated that no progress was made to improve conditions for the full exercise of freedom of expression. In July 2016, the ruling party organized an exhibition of government-critical press articles and social media posts, labeled as 'lies', saying that they wanted to document wrongful attacks and to prove there is no official censorship. In 2017, Freedom House reported that Serbia posted one of the largest single-year declines in press freedom among all the countries and territories. It also said that Vučić had sought to squeeze critical media out of the market and discredit the few journalists with the funds and fortitude to keep working. Some commentators have said that Vučić built a cult of personality, with the significant role of mass media.

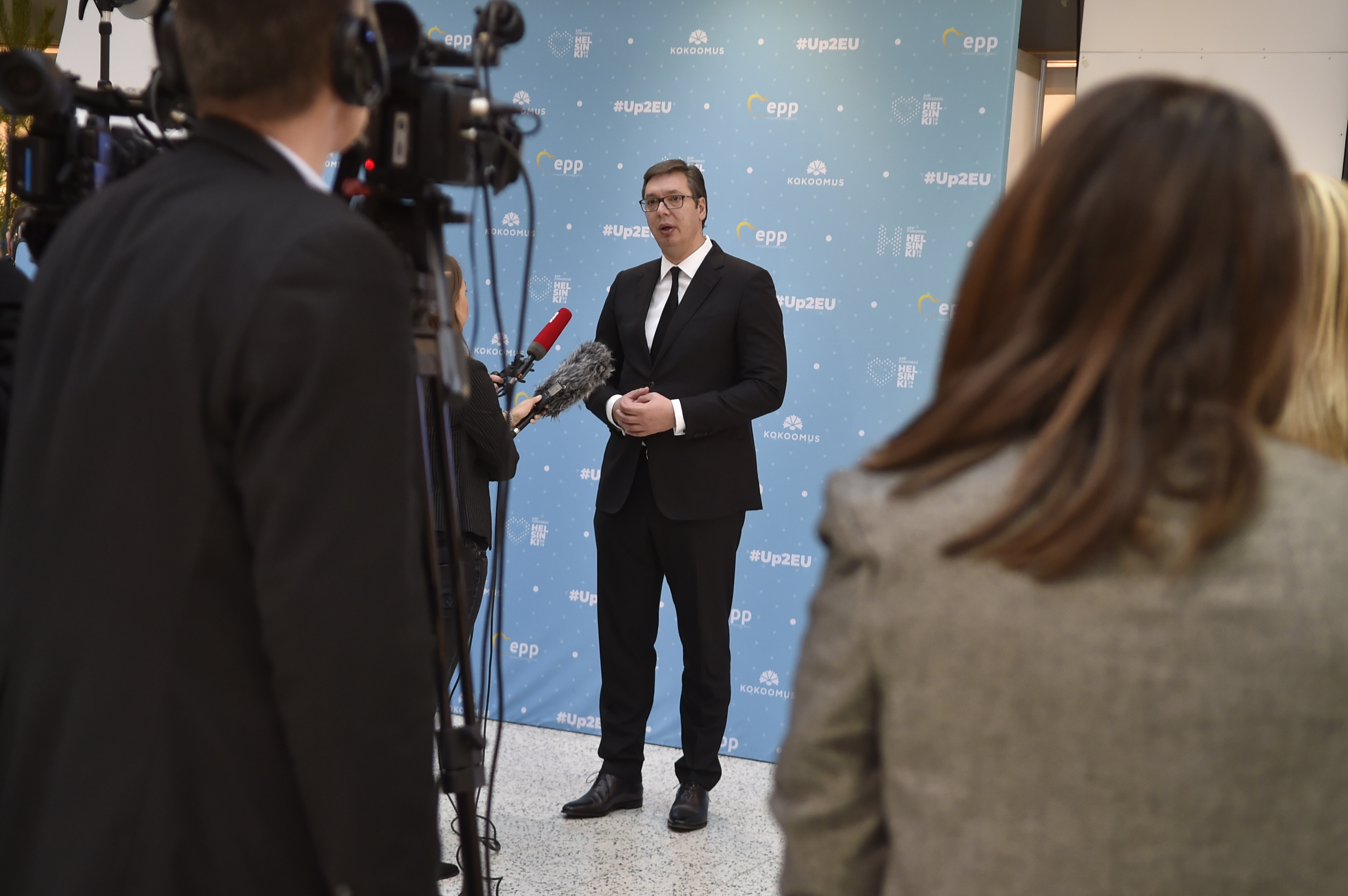
Vučić with journalists during European People's Party Congress in Helsinki (2018)

Observers reported that during the campaign for the 2017 presidential election, Vučić had ten times more airtime on national broadcasters than all other candidates combined and mainstream media under Vučić's control have been demonizing most of the opposition presidential candidates, without giving them the opportunity to respond. Organizations that observed the elections emphasized that the presence of Vučić in newspaper and the electronic media during the presidential campaign was disproportionate, adding that media have lost their critical role and that they have become a means of political propaganda. The OSCE report said that the media's general reluctance to report critically on or challenge the governing authorities significantly reduced the amount of impartial information available to voters. They also mentioned that the government used public resources to support Vučić. Amnesty International and Human Rights Watch reported harassment and physical assaults on journalists during the presidential inauguration ceremony, after Vučić won the elections.

Within five years of President Aleksandar Vučić in effect governing the country, Serbia has become a place where practicing journalism is neither safe nor supported by the state. The number of attacks on media is on the rise, including death threats, and inflammatory rhetoric targeting journalists is increasingly coming from the governing officials.

— Reporters Without Borders

In 2018, International Research & Exchanges Board described the media situation in Serbia as the worst in recent history, saying that its Media Sustainability Index had dropped because of the most polarized media in almost 20 years, an increase in fake news and editorial pressure on the media. It also said that the judiciary responded promptly only in cases in which the media allegedly violated the rights of the authorities and ruling parties. The increased government control of the media comes as Serbian journalists face more political pressure and intimidation, in 2018 the Independent Journalists' Association of Serbia (NUNS) recorded the highest number of attacks against journalists in decade. According to Serbian investigative journalism portal Crime and Corruption Reporting Network, more than 700 false news stories were published on the front pages of pro-government tabloids during 2018. Many of them were about alleged attacks on Vučić and attempts of coups, as well as messages of support to him by Vladimir Putin. The bestselling newspaper in Serbia is the pro-government tabloid Informer, which most often presents Vučić as a powerful person under constant attack, and also has anti-European content and pro-war rhetoric. After Vučić was hospitalized for cardiovascular problems in November 2019, his associates and pro-government media accused journalists of worsening the president's health by asking questions about alleged corruption by government ministers. The Council of Europe warned of a smear campaign in Serbia against journalists of the investigative outlet KRIK after it reported on Vučić's son being seen with members of criminal groups; according to the Organized Crime and Corruption Reporting Project, Vučić pledged to "fight the lies" about his son. In early November 2021, seven US congressmen accused Vučić of deepening corruption and putting pressure on the media.

==== Online influence operations ====
Since Vučić's party came to power, Serbia has seen a surge of internet trolls and pages on social networks praising the government and attacking its critics, free media and the opposition in general. These included a handful of dedicated employees running fake accounts and a Facebook page associated with a Serbian franchise of the far-right Breitbart News website. On 26 March 2020, Twitter announced that they had shut down a network of 8,500 spam accounts that worked in concert to write 43 million tweets praising president Vučić and his party, boosting Vučić-aligned content to increase its visibility and popularity, and attacking his political opponents.

== Criticism and controversies ==
=== Greater Serbia ===
Until 2008, Vučić publicly supported the Greater Serbia ideology, which he testified was envisaged as extending to a western border running along the Virovitica–Karlovac–Karlobag line. In 1995, during the Croatian War of Independence, Vučić said in Glina (which was at the time controlled by Serb rebels) that 'Serbian Krajina' and Glina would never be Croatian, Banovina would never be returned to Croatia, and that if the Serbian Radical Party had won the elections, Serbs would have lived in Greater Serbia. In another speech from the early 2000s, Vučić called Karlobag, Ogulin, Karlovac and Virovitica "Serbian towns", stated that "they [SRS' critics] rejoice that Ustaše (referring to Croats) have occupied Serbian lands and want to convince us Serbian radicals that it wasn't Serbian, that we were saying nonsenses. (...) We want what's ours, Serbian." After split from the Serbian Radical Party and creation of the Serbian Progressive Party, Vučić said he no longer supports the Greater Serbia ideology.

On 1 September 2020, Montenegrin President Milo Đukanović accused Vučić and Belgrade-based media of interfering in the internal politics of Montenegro, as well of allegedly trying to revive a "Greater Serbia policy".

=== Srebrenica massacre and Ratko Mladić ===
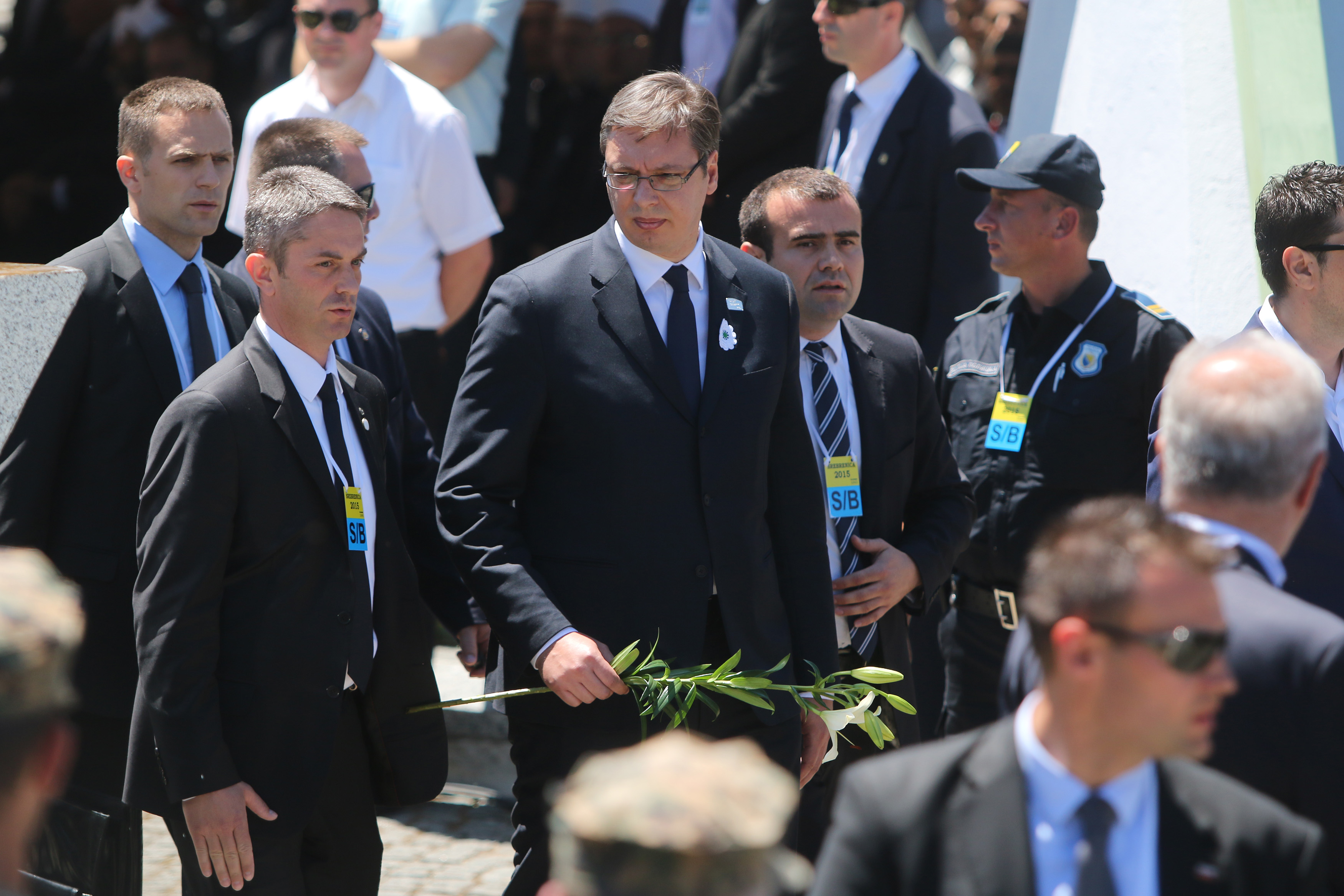
Vučić attending the commemoration of the 20th anniversary of the Srebrenica massacre, 11 July 2015

Only a few days after more than 8,000 Muslim Bosniaks were killed by the Army of Republika Srpska (VRS) and paramilitary groups from Serbia in the Srebrenica massacre, Vučić said on 20 July 1995 in the National Assembly in a comment on the NATO bombing campaign against the VRS positions that "for every Serb killed, we will kill 100 Muslims". In 2015, he said that his statement from 1995 was "taken out of context" and "that was not the essence of that sentence."

Before leaving Vojislav Šešelj's Radical Party, Vučić publicly praised and called for the protection of Ratko Mladić, a military officer later convicted of war crimes, crimes against humanity, and genocide. In 2007, while Mladić was still at large in Serbia, Vučić distributed posters with the declaration "Safe House for General Mladić". During a parliament session he stated that the Serbian Parliament will always protect and be a safe house for the general and that any house in Serbia that bears the last name of Vučić will protect and shelter Mladić.

In the same year, Vučić organized a street action during which signs bearing the name of Zoran Đinđić, the assassinated pro-Western prime minister, were replaced with signs reading "Ratko Mladić Boulevard". This vandalism has become a frequent activity of Serbian ultra-right groups on the anniversary of the Zoran Đinđić assassination.

Vučić also took part in protests against the arrest or transfer to The Hague of people later convicted of war crimes, including Veselin Šljivančanin, Radovan Karadžić, and Vojislav Šešelj, who was president of his party.

In 2024, Vučić condemned the UN General Assembly's decision to adopt an annual commemoration of the Srebrenica massacre.

=== Račak massacre ===
In December 2019, Vučić generated controversy for referring to the 1999 Račak massacre of 45 Albanian civilians as "fabricated", and accusing the former head of the OSCE Kosovo Verification Mission William G. Walker of faking the evidence for the killings. His remarks came after the conviction of Kosovo Serb MP Ivan Todosijevic by the Pristina Basic Court for incitement to ethnic, racial or religious intolerance for claiming that the massacre was staged.

The statement was condemned by Kosovo president Hashim Thaçi, as well as prime minister Ramush Haradinaj, and Minister for Foreign affairs, Behgjet Pacolli. The statement was also condemned by the European Union. Lawyer Tome Gashi filed a criminal complaint to Kosovo's Special Prosecution, alleging Vučić had "intentionally incited and spread hatred, division and intolerance between ethnic groups, Serbs and Albanians in Kosovo". Upon the 25th anniversary of the massacre in 2024, Kosovo president Vjosa Osmani again criticized Vučić for denying the killings, with Prime Minister Albin Kurti criticizing Vučić for not apologizing for the massacre, either as Milošević's minister of information or as president of Serbia.

=== Slavko Ćuruvija ===
During Vučić's term as minister of information, Slavko Ćuruvija, a prominent journalist who reported on the Kosovo War and owner of Dnevni telegraf, was shot dead in Belgrade on 11 April 1999. Four former State Security Service officers were convicted of the murder in 2019 and again in a 2021 retrial, but the Court of Appeal in Belgrade acquitted them in a final judgment published on 2 February 2024. In January 2026, the Supreme Court found that the acquittal had been reached with substantial procedural violations in the defendants' favor, without overturning it. Before the murder, in 1999, Vučić gave a front-page interview to the tabloid Argument in which he said, "I will wreak vengeance upon Slavko Ćuruvija for all the lies published in Dnevni telegraf" (Ćuruvija's paper). In 2014, Vučić apologized to the Ćuruvija family for having waited so long to bring the perpetrators to justice, and thanked everyone who was involved in solving the case for their work. Branka Prpa, Ćuruvija's common-law spouse, alleged in 2015 that Vučić had participated in the murder and that he had created the practice of persecuting journalists.

=== Remarks on journalists ===
At an SNS gathering in Bor on 2 March 2025, Vučić referred to a female reporter from the public broadcaster RTS who had been covering the anti-corruption protests, as an "imbecile". Vučić later apologized for the remarks, which were condemned by RTS.

== Personal life ==
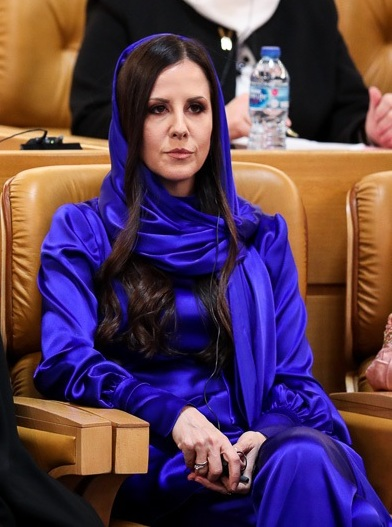
Tamara Đukanović, who married Vučić in 2013

On 27 July 1997, Vučić married Ksenija Janković, a journalist at Radio Index and Srpska reč. The couple had two children before divorcing: Danilo (born 1 December 1998) and Milica. Janković died on 29 January 2022. In December 2013, Vučić married Tamara Đukanović, a diplomat with the Ministry of Foreign Affairs of Serbia. On 9 June 2017, a week after Vučić took office as president, his wife gave birth to a son.

According to his official biography, he speaks Russian and English, has a basic knowledge of French and has been studying German. He learned Russian at secondary school in Belgrade and later took additional Russian lessons.

While in opposition, he frequently appeared on popular television shows. In 2006, Vučić became the winner of the first season of the Serbian version of The Pyramid, a talk show with a competitive element broadcast on Pink TV. He was the first politician who participated in the humanitarian dance contest Plesom do snova in 2009 and the first politician to guest-star on a late-night talk show Veče sa Ivanom Ivanovićem in 2010. He also was a guest judge in one episode of the third season of Zvezde Granda.

On 15 November 2019, he was hospitalized at a military hospital in Belgrade due to apparent "cardiovascular issues". Three days later, it was reported that he was released. Some, including his media advisor and the deputy mayor of Belgrade, said that his health problems were in part due to pressure from journalists. Vučić explicitly denied this at a media conference shortly after his hospital stay, stating that these health issues were chronic in nature.

In July 2020, Vučić became a student at Belgrade's College of Sports and Health, with the aim of becoming a youth basketball coach after his political career. Some Serbian journalists have reported that a mandatory condition for entering the college was active participation in sports for three years, which was removed from the official website shortly after Vučić's enrollment.

== Honours ==
=== State orders ===
| Award or decoration | Country | Date | Place |
|---|---|---|---|
| Order of the Republika Srpska | Bosnia and Herzegovina; Republika Srpska | 15 February 2018 | Banja Luka |
| Order of Makarios III | Cyprus | 20 May 2018 | Nicosia |
| Order of Friendship | Kazakhstan | 9 October 2018 | Astana |
| Order of Alexander Nevsky | Russia | 17 January 2019 | Belgrade |
| Order of the White Lion | Czech Republic | 18 May 2021 | Prague |
| Order of Saint-Charles | Monaco | 22 February 2022 | Monaco City |
| Hungarian Order of Merit | Hungary | 23 August 2024 | Budapest |
| Order of the Golden Eagle | Kazakhstan | 27 February 2026 | Astana |
| Friendship Medal | China | 25 May 2026 | Beijing |

=== Church orders ===
| Award or decoration | Church | Date | Place |
|---|---|---|---|
| Order of the Grand Cross of Mark the Apostle | Greek Orthodox Patriarchate of Alexandria | 25 September 2017 | Belgrade |
| Order of St. Sava | Serbian Orthodox Church | 8 October 2019 | Belgrade |
| Order of the Venerable Prohor Pčinjski | Serbian Orthodox Church | 13 June 2021 | Vranje |
| Order of the Eparchy of Buda | Serbian Orthodox Church | 19 August 2023 | Szentendre |
| Order of the Slovak Evangelical Church | Slovak Evangelical Church | 13 December 2023 | Novi Sad |
| Order of Saint George the Victorious | Serbian Orthodox Church | 20 July 2025 | Berane |
| Order of the New Martyrs of Bihać-Petrovac | Serbian Orthodox Church | 9 February 2026 | Belgrade |

=== Honorary doctorates ===
| Date | University | Note |
|---|---|---|
| 2017 | Moscow State Institute of International Relations | |
| 2018 | Azerbaijan University of Languages | |

=== Honorary citizenship ===
| Country | City | Date |
|---|---|---|
| Serbia | Honorary citizen of Leskovac | 10 October 2013 |
| Serbia | Honorary citizen of Novi Pazar | 20 April 2015 |
| Serbia | Honorary citizen of Krupanj | 24 July 2015 |
| Serbia | Honorary citizen of Svrljig | 8 May 2017 |
| Serbia | Honorary citizen of Loznica | 16 June 2018 |
| Bosnia and Herzegovina | Honorary citizen of Trebinje | 22 October 2018 |
| Bosnia and Herzegovina | Honorary citizen of Drvar | 21 July 2019 |
| Bosnia and Herzegovina | Honorary citizen of Sokolac | 29 July 2019 |
| Serbia | Honorary citizen of Aleksandrovac | 7 February 2020 |
| Bosnia and Herzegovina | Honorary citizen of Banja Luka | 22 April 2021 |
| Serbia | Honorary citizen of Šabac | 22 April 2021 |
| Serbia | Honorary citizen of Smederevska Palanka | 28 June 2021 |
| Serbia | Honorary citizen of Zvečan | 12 July 2021 |
| Serbia | Honorary citizen of Valjevo | 28 July 2021 |
| Serbia | Honorary citizen of Jagodina | 29 September 2021 |
| Serbia | Honorary citizen of Rekovac | 17 October 2021 |
| Bosnia and Herzegovina | Honorary citizen of Gradiška | 18 April 2022 |
| Serbia | Honorary citizen of Gornji Milanovac | 23 April 2023 |
| Serbia | Honorary citizen of Kladovo | 27 April 2023 |
| Serbia | Honorary citizen of Subotica | 6 July 2023 |
| Serbia | Honorary citizen of Sjenica | 16 August 2023 |
| Serbia | Honorary citizen of Prijepolje | 7 July 2024 |
| Bosnia and Herzegovina | Honorary citizen of Stanari | 27 August 2024 |

=== Other ===
- Gold Medal of Merit of the City of Athens, 2019
- Friends of Zion Award, 2020
- The key of the city of Banja Luka, 2021
- The Great Cross of vožd Đorđe Stratimirović, 2021
- The Hippocratic Medal, for contributions to the advancement of healthcare, Society of Physicians of Vojvodina, 2022
- Gold Medal for Merit, First Class, Security Intelligence Agency, 2024

== Sources ==
- Isailović, Danijela (6 September 2010). "Ispao majci dok ga je dojila". Press (in Serbian). Archived from the original on 4 March 2016.
- "Najvažniji politički lideri regije porijeklom su iz BiH: Milanović, Bandić, Jeremić, Tadić, Vučić..." (in Croatian). Index.hr. 18 July 2013.
- "Vučić se prisjetio dana kada se tukao s Boysima na Maksimiru: Bilo je to očekivano, osjećala se mržnja" (in Croatian). Index.hr. 13 May 2015.

Political offices
| Preceded by Radmila Milentijević | Minister of Information; 1998–2000 | Succeeded by Ivica Dačić; Bogoljub Pejčić; Biserka Matić Spasojević |
| Preceded by Dragan Šutanovac | Minister of Defence; 2012–2013 | Succeeded by Nebojša Rodić |
| Preceded by Ivica Dačić | First Deputy Prime Minister of Serbia; 2012–2014 | Succeeded by Ivica Dačić |
| Preceded by Ivica Dačić | Prime Minister of Serbia; 2014–2017 | Succeeded by Ivica Dačić; Acting |
| Preceded by Tomislav Nikolić | President of Serbia; 2017–2026 | Succeeded by Ana Brnabić; Acting |
Party political offices
| Preceded by Tomislav Nikolić | President of the Serbian Progressive Party; 2012–2023 | Succeeded by Miloš Vučević |
