= Vučić family =

Noble family of the Republic of Ragusa

The House of Vučić or Volzio was a noble family from the city of Dubrovnik and the Republic of Ragusa.
