= Monastery of Saint Petka Iverica =

Serbian Orthodox monastery in Ostrovica, Niška Banja, Serbia

- Манастир Свете Петке „Иверица“
- Monastery church

- Location within Serbia

Monastery information
- Full name: Monastery of Saint Petka "Iverica"
- Other name: Royal Serbian Military Monastery "Saint Petka Iverica"
- Order: Serbian Orthodox
- Denomination: Eastern Orthodoxy
- Established: First half of the 14th century
- Disestablished: 16th century
- Reestablished: 1898
- Dedication: Saint Petka
- Consecrated: 14 October 1898
- Diocese: Eparchy of Niš
- Controlled churches: Church of Saint Petka

People
- Founder: Stefan Uroš V
- Important associated figures: Stefan Uroš V, Alexander I of Serbia, Živojin Damnjanović

Architecture
- Status: Active
- Functional status: Monastery
- Heritage designation

Cultural Heritage of Serbia
- Official name: Манастир Свете Петке „Иверица“
- Type: Monument of Culture of Great Importance
- Designated: 18 December 1963; 1983
- Reference no.: SK 238
- Official Gazette: SRS 28/83
- Architect: Svetozar Ivačković
- Style: Serbo-Byzantine style
- Completed date: 1898

Site
- Location: Ostrovica, Niška Banja
- Country: Serbia
- Coordinates: 43°20′12″N 22°7′51″E
- Visible remains: Kitchen-chimney room (mutvak-odžaklija) of the old residence and conical stone chapel
- Public access: yes

The Monastery of Saint Petka "Iverica" (Serbian: Манастир Свете Петке „Иверица“, romanized: Manastir Svete Petke "Iverica") is a medieval Serbian monastery dating from the first half of the 14th century. It originated during the reign of Stefan Uroš V. The monastery is located in the village territory of Ostrovica in the municipality of Niška Banja, about 20 km east of Niš towards Pirot, in the central part of the Sićevo Gorge, on the right bank of the Nišava River. It is designated as an immovable cultural property and a cultural monument.

The Monastery of Saint Petka "Iverica" was the first and only military monastery in the Serbian Orthodox Church and formerly bore the title Royal Serbian Military Monastery "Saint Petka Iverica".

== Status and degree of protection ==
Due to its historical, architectural, and religious significance, the Monastery of Saint Petka "Iverica" in Ostrovica was declared a Monument of Culture of Great Importance by decision of the Republic Institute for the Protection of Cultural Monuments of Serbia (SK 238, Official Gazette of the SRS 28/83; Decision No. 965/02 of 18 December 1963 and 28/83), and is inscribed in the Central Register of Cultural Monuments in the Republic of Serbia.

The competent institution responsible for maintaining the local register and caring for this site is the Institute for the Protection of Cultural Monuments of Niš.

== Location and characteristics of the monastery complex ==
The Monastery of Saint Petka Iverica is situated in the fourth (canyon) section of the Sićevo Gorge, which is 5.5 km long and known as the Gradište Canyon. The canyon encompasses the area from the railway bridge over the Nišava near the settlement of Ostrovica, where the railway crosses to the left bank of the river, to the Bela Palanka Basin.

Geographical position

- North latitude: 40° 35′ 28"
- East longitude: 22° 01′ 05"
- Altitude: 260 m

The Saint Petka Iverica monastery complex is carved into the rock mass of the northern wall at the entrance to the Gradište Canyon, which at that point is 360 m high and 50 m wide, on the right bank of the Nišava River, 100 m north of the international main road and railway line Niš–Sofia–Istanbul, 22 km from Niš and 12 km from Niška Banja. At that location, the international railway line crosses from the right bank of the Nišava to the left and, after passing through four tunnels, exits the Sićevo Gorge. Likewise, along the right bank of the Nišava starting from the Monastery of Saint Petka Iverica in the Gradište Canyon and heading upstream towards Crvena Reka, the international road E-80 (Niš–Sofia–Istanbul) was cut through the rock and partly built through 13 tunnels with a total length of 1,045 m.

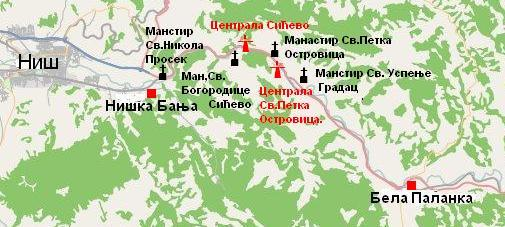
The Monastery of Saint Petka "Iverica" is among the sites of material and spiritual culture in the Sićevo Gorge (a gathering place of monastic communities in Serbia during the Ottoman rule).

== Conditions for the emergence of the monastery ==
The Sićevo Gorge, a water gap formed by the Nišava River, remained impassable until the late 19th century, when this region was liberated from the Ottoman Empire and the Niš–Sofia railway was cut through its narrows and limestone cliffs. Within its remote recesses, it preserved for centuries—though "of modest dimensions and unassuming appearance"—material and cultural testimonies to the medieval past of Niš, the Nišava Valley, and Southern Serbia. Ever since the era of the Roman Empire, the Sićevo Gorge posed an obstacle to road builders, causing major thoroughfares, including the Via Militaris, to bypass it along its southern side across Mount Kunovica.

On this mountain, on 2 January 1444, the Serbian and Hungarian armies led by Đurađ Branković and John Hunyadi, in their attempt to halt the Ottoman army in its conquest of the Balkans, defeated and stopped the Ottoman forces in the center of Kunovica. Despite their initial successes, the Serbian and Hungarian forces withdrew from the Nišava region under the pressure of the Ottoman army, and its inhabitants came under the rule of the Ottoman Empire.

For road builders during the era of the Ottoman Empire, the Sićevo Gorge likewise remained an obstacle and stayed off the main routes, including the Tsarigrad Road, which crossed Kunovica along almost the same path as the Via Militaris. This allowed monastic life in the ravines of the Sićevo Gorge to continue in isolation, particularly during wartime and Ottoman rule.

This isolation attracted clerics from across the Balkans. In the mid-15th century, monks fleeing westward before the Ottoman advance began settling in the Sićevo Gorge. Among them were Greek, Russian, and Bulgarian monks, as well as Serbs from Mount Athos. These monks built monasteries, churches, and shrines in the secluded areas of the Sićevo Gorge, seeking shelter from the Ottomans.

Thus, the area of the Sićevo Gorge became an ecclesiastical center with 20 monasteries, churches, and church sites, and the fifth major gathering place of monastic communities—referred to as a small "Holy Mountain", in which books were written and illuminated, and churches and monasteries were restored or built from the ground up and painted with frescoes.

Among the local population, these sanctuaries gave rise to various legends about the Sićevo Gorge. According to one tradition, in retaliation against the local population, the Ottomans buried twelve girls alive in front of the doors of the Monastery of Saint Petka. During the construction of the new church, remains of jewelry and bones were unearthed at the site.

The importance of the Sićevo monastic community was also influenced by the fact that during the rule of the Ottoman Empire, Niš was an administrative and religious center that restricted non-Muslim faiths. Because the religious and cultural life of Serbs and other Christians was restricted within the city itself, monks relocated spiritual life into the remote areas of the Sićevo Gorge. Wealthier Serbs from Niš and its surroundings also supported the churches and monasteries and attended Orthodox religious rites away from the Ottoman authorities.

Throughout the period of Ottoman rule, rebellions and uprisings broke out, and insurgents and hajduks took refuge in the Sićevo Gorge and its monasteries.

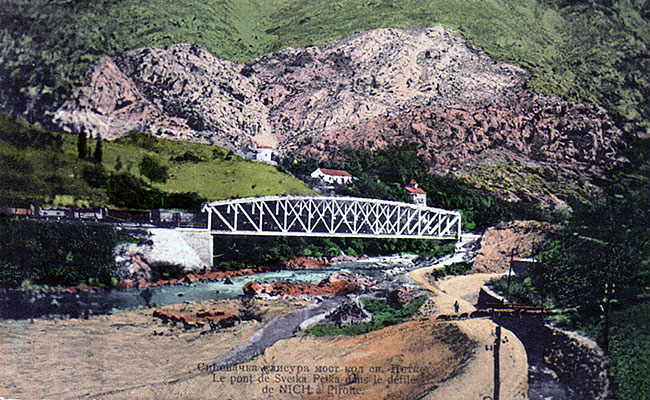
The Saint Petka Iverica monastery complex is carved into a 360 m high rock mass at the entrance to the Gradište Canyon of the Sićevo Gorge, alongside the Niš–Sofia main road and railway

== History of the original church ==
From 1886 to 1887, engineering units of the Serbian Army built the railway through the Sićevo Gorge, and alongside it the Church of Saint Petka in Ostrovica.

Commemorative plaque with inscriptions about the construction of the church

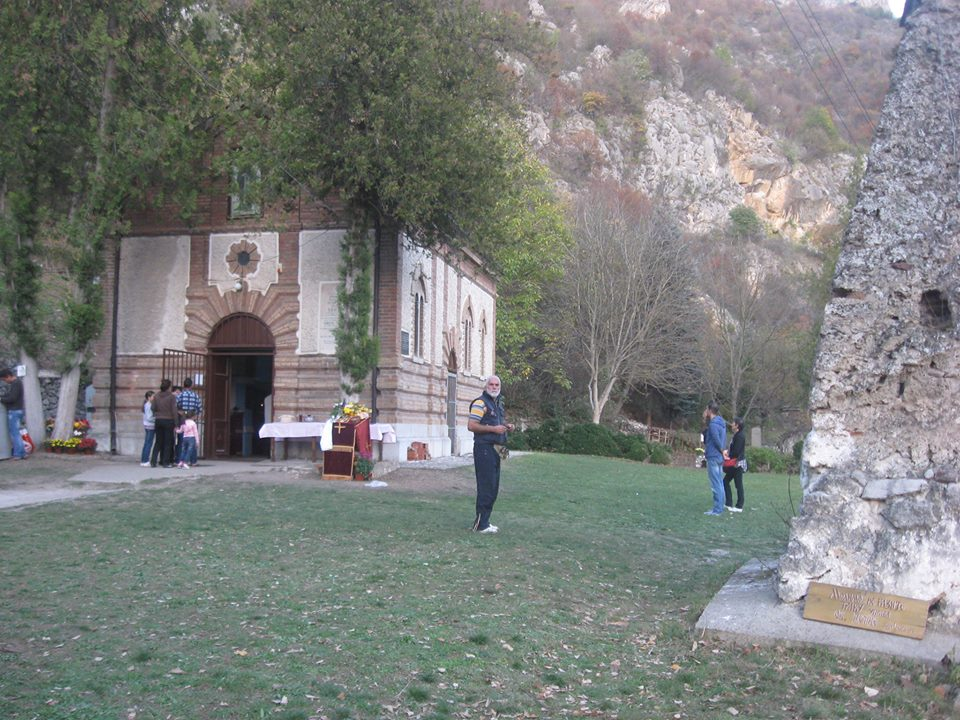
Monastery church (built by Serbian soldiers) with a conical stone chapel.

The history of the original Church of the Monastery of Saint Petka in Ostrovica has not been fully investigated. The addition of the epithet "Iverica" to the name of Saint Petka suggests that the old monastery was founded by monks from the Georgian Iviron Monastery on Mount Athos, in the late 14th or early 15th century. Fleeing the Ottoman advance across the Balkans, monks from occupied territories, including Mount Athos and the Iviron Monastery, abandoned their sanctuaries. They found refuge in the Sićevo Gorge, where, alongside several other monasteries, they founded the Monastery of Saint Petka on the remains of an older, deserted monastery whose origin and date of foundation were unknown to them.

It was one of the sanctuaries (monasteries, churches, and church sites) in the Sićevo Gorge referred to in historiography as the Colony of Russian Monks in the Sićevo Gorge. The local population preserved their memory by adding the names Iverica or Iverac to the Monastery of Saint Petka, after the Iviron Monastery.

In an Ottoman tax register (defter) from the reign of Sultan Mehmed III (1595–1603), the Monastery of Saint Petka is mentioned for the last time at the end of the 16th century "as a debtor of tithes on grain, fruit, beehives, mills, and other items in the total amount of 500 akçes." The size of the levy indicates that it was a financially active monastery at the time.

The Ottomans demolished the monastery during a popular assembly in the 16th century, and until the late 19th century, only the ruins of the old Monastery of Saint Petka were visible. Tradition holds that the Ottomans buried 12 young girls alive on the church grounds, whom the Church subsequently venerated as martyrs.

Of the original monastery, only the kitchen-chimney room (mutvak-odžaklija) of the old monastic residence (konak) and a truncated stone pyramid remain visible today. In the old foundations of the monastery church excavated in the late 19th century, three layers of construction were discovered along with artifacts from various periods—spears, arrows, armour, and coins from the reign of King Uroš I—attesting to the age and repeated destruction of the earliest churches on this site.

For the fourth and final time, the Church of Saint Petka—which still stands in that form today—was erected in 1898 on the foundations of an older church built by the Mrnjavčević family (itself built over an even older place of worship and later restored by monks from Iviron) by engineering units of the Serbian Army that were preparing the terrain for digging tunnels and passages for the road and railway through the Gradište Canyon of the Sićevo Gorge.

While working on the development of Serbia's transport network in the 19th century, the engineers of the Serbian Army received word that King Alexander I had been saved from drowning at sea near Biarritz, France, and began the restoration of the church to mark the occasion. According to the commemorative plaque of the church builders, they erected the structure:

To the glory of the fortunate salvation of the Supreme Commander of the Royal Serbian Army, His Majesty King Alexander I, they restore this church from its foundations, thanking the Almighty for preserving the precious life of the Exalted Lord of Serbia, and as a token of the warm feelings with which they are imbued toward his exalted person. Officers and soldiers of the engineering troops. The construction of the building was directed by Captain Živojin Damnjanović.

In addition to the inscription on the commemorative plaque mounted on the western wall beside the church entrance, the construction of the church is recorded in the book Lives of the Saints belonging to the Monastery of Saint Petka in Ostrovica, which Hieromonk Stefan of the Monastery of the Dormition of the Most Holy Mother of God in Veta preserved and had bound in Belgrade at the monastery's expense. In this book, which contains the only surviving handwritten note by the builder of the Church of Saint Petka in Ostrovica, Engineering Captain Živojin Damnjanović, on the first page in blue ink, written on the anniversary of the consecration of the Church of Saint Petka in 1899 in Ostrovica, it reads:

Today, 15 February 1899, we celebrated in this church of St. Petka and Royal Monastery the 700th anniversary since the first Nemanjić, Stevan, later St. Simeon the Myrrh-streaming, passed away. This was recorded by Engineering Captain Živojin Damnjanović, who this year as in previous ones (illegible) with the soldiers of this company. At this monastery and site, over three years of work, they restored it from the foundations in memory of the fortunate and miraculous salvation of His Majesty the King of Serbia Alexander I Obrenović V when he was in danger at sea in Biarritz on 19 August 1895. This church was consecrated on 14 October 1898.

The monastery church was designed by the Ministry of Construction. The chief architect of the church was Svetozar Ivačković from Belgrade. Financial support for its construction was also provided by King Alexander I.

== The only military monastery in Serbia ==
From its consecration in 1898 until 1903, the monastery was in the possession of the Serbian Army and religious services were conducted by military chaplains, as confirmed by a decree of King Alexander I dated February 19, 1901, appointing a military chaplain as head of the monastery. During this period, the monastery bore the official name Royal Serbian Military Monastery of Saint Petka Iverica. The full title appears on the monastery seal used to certify a telegram in 1903. No other such example is known in the history of the Serbian Orthodox Church.

Material evidence confirming that the Monastery of Saint Petka "Iverica" operated as a military monastery in Serbia includes:

- A preserved decree of King Alexander I Obrenović appointing "military chaplain Mr. Žunić as head of the military monastery of Saint Petka", dated February 19, 1901.
- A telegram dated May 29, 1903, notifying subordinate units of the assassination of King Alexander and Queen Draga, certified with the monastery seal bearing the full name of the monastery at the time — Royal Serbian Military Monastery of Saint Petka "Iverica".

From its consecration until the May Coup of 1903, the monastery remained the property of the Serbian Army, after which it passed into the ownership of the Eparchy of Niš.

== Architecture and fresco decoration ==
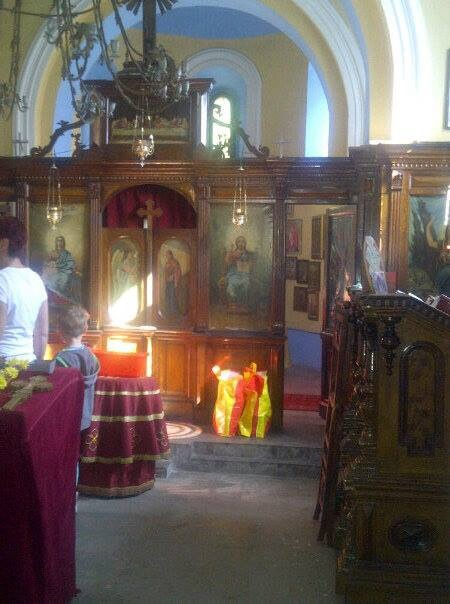
Interior of the church with the iconostasis

Architecture

The church was built according to a standard design of the contemporary Ministry of Construction in the Serbo-Byzantine style. Architecturally, it is a single-nave building with a semicircular apse to the east, whose walls, due to the alternating use of two-tone decoration, resemble courses of stone and brick. Above the nave rises a dome resting on an octagonal drum.

The church is entered from the western and southern sides through arched portals whose archivolts are radially decorated. The interior is lit through four mullioned (bifora) windows along the nave, three simple windows on the apse, and one window on each face of the drum. All window openings are arched at the top and surmounted by archivolts in shallow relief.

Next to the church stands a detached bell tower dating from 1898, housing three bells weighing 400 kilograms.

Along the southern border of the monastery courtyard, beside the fence along the Niš–Sofia main road, stands a conical structure of semi-dressed stone converted into a chapel. It is one of the few surviving remnants of the older monastery complex.

Adjacent to the church is the monastery cemetery, where several military engineers who lost their lives while boring tunnels through the Sićevo Gorge during the construction of the church are buried.

Fresco decoration

The interior of the church of the Monastery of Saint Petka "Iverica" is not frescoed; only the vault is painted as a blue sky dotted with stars. There is also a single wall painting depicting a "Storm at Sea", intended to commemorate the event that prompted the engineers of the Serbian Army to erect the monastery church. On the exterior western facade of the church, an image of Saint Petka painted on sheet metal is visible.

The iconostasis, installed upon the completion of the church, was painted by Milutin Marković, an art professor at the "King Milan I" Gymnasium in Niš. Marković modeled the iconostasis after those of Russian churches.

== Threats and vulnerability ==
A quarry opened in Ostrovica in 1886, 200 meters away as the crow flies, has threatened the monastery, its buildings, and the surrounding forest and plant vegetation for over 125 years due to stone dust, vibrations, and flying rock debris caused by blasting.

The Institute for Nature Conservation in Niš also noted the negative impact of road traffic, as the Niš–Sofia road passes directly beside the monastery, exposing the complex to vibrations and air pollution.

With the opening to traffic on 9 November 2019 of the eastern branch of the E-80 highway, which bypasses the Sićevo Gorge on the southern side, the negative impact of the old Niš–Sofia road through the Sićevo Gorge on the infrastructure of the Monastery of Saint Petka Iverica has been reduced through lower vibration levels and decreased air pollution.

== See also ==
- List of Serbian Orthodox monasteries
- Sićevo Gorge
- Ostrovica, Niška Banja

== Sources ==
- Spomenik. Naučno delo. 1991.
- Rakocija, Miša (1998). Manastiri i crkve grada Niša. Prosveta.
- Zirojević, Olga (1976). Carigradski drum od Beograda do Budima u XVI i XVII veku. Institut za izučavanje istorije Vojvodine.
- Novaković, Stojan (1893). Srbi i turci XIV i XV veka: istorijske studije o prvim borbama s najezdom turskom pre i posle boja na Kosovu. Štampano u Državnoj štampariji.
- Mijatović, Čedomilj (1882). Despot Đurađ Branković: Od prvog oslobođenja od turaka godine 1444 do smrti Đurđeve godine 1456. Štampano u Državnoj štampariji.
- Simonović, Dragoljub; Ćirić, Jovan (1995). Enciklopedija Niša: Priroda, prostor, stanovništvo. Ǵradina. ISBN 978-86-7129-156-9.
