= Balanica =

Cave complex in Serbia

Velika Balanica, Mala Balanica
- Велика Баланица, Мала Баланица
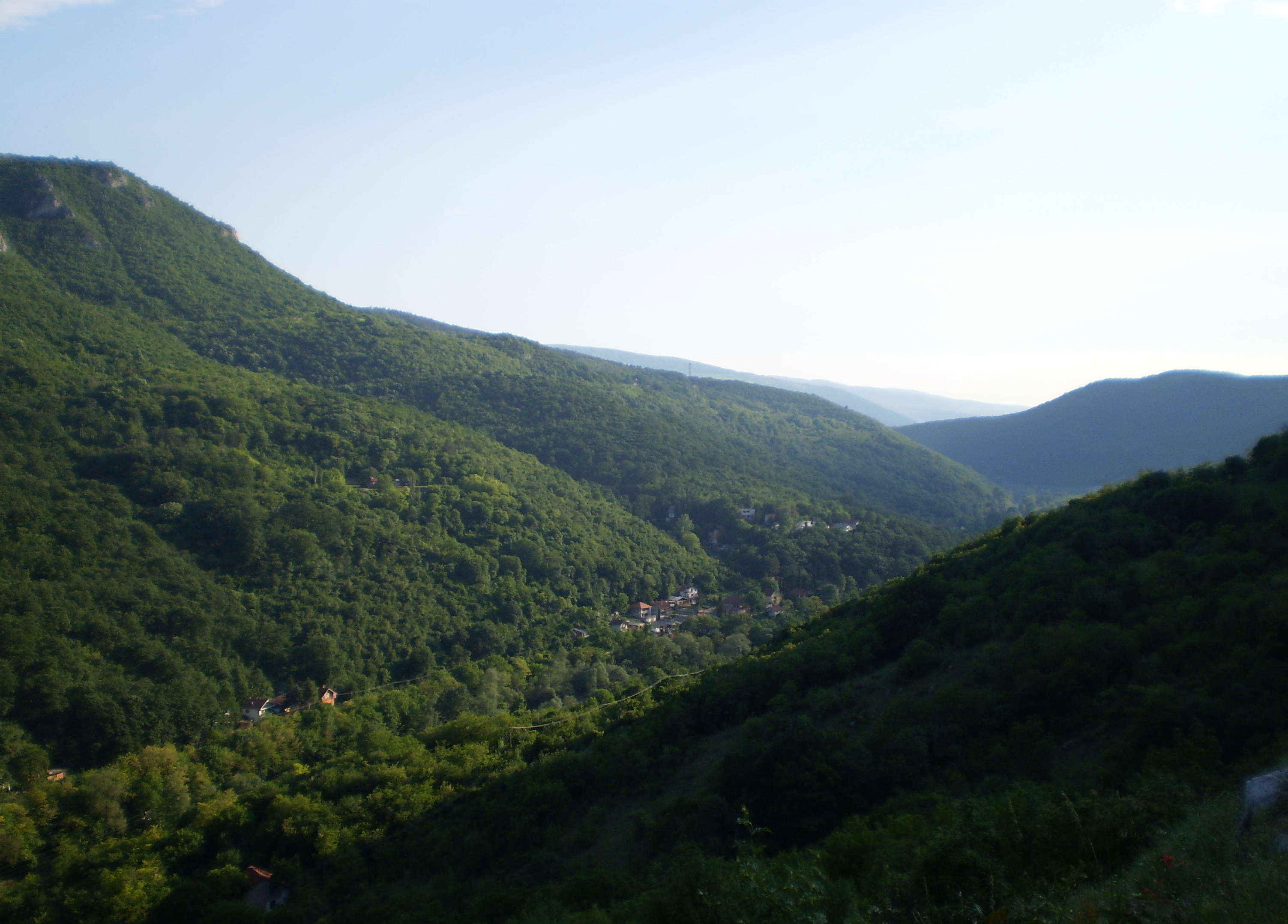
- Sićevo gorge, location of the Balanica caves

- Location within Serbia
- Coordinates: 43°20′21″N 22°05′11″E
- Depth: 25 m (82 ft)
- Discovery: 2002
- Geology: Limestone
- Entrances: 2
- Difficulty: Hard
- Hazards: Cliffs
- Access: Only for surveys
- Cave survey: Since 2004

Balanica (Serbian Cyrillic: Баланица) is a cave complex, archaeological and palentological site in the City of Niš' municipality of Niška Banja in southeast Serbia. It consists of Velika Balanica and Mala Balanica (meaning Great and Little Balanica). The entrances of two caves are 7 m (23 ft) apart, at an elevation of 329 m (1,079 ft), and form one cave system. The two Balanica caves extend parallel to each other, likely being connected at the rear.

In 2006, remains of a non-Neanderthal archaic Homo were discovered in Mala Balanica. Estimated to be up to 525,000 years old, it was the oldest hominin remains discovery in Serbia and third oldest in Europe discovered at the time.

In 2022, Neanderthal fossils were discovered in Velika Balanica. Estimated to be 300,000 years old, they represent the oldest Neanderthal remains in Eastern Europe and the second oldest hominin fossils found in Serbia to date. This makes Velika Balanica one of the oldest sites in Europe documenting the transition from the Lower to the Middle Paleolithic. The caves also confirm that the Balkan Peninsula, due to its geographical location, was always an important crossroads, and a migration corridor even for archaic humans, connecting continents already 300,000 years ago. Different hominin morphologies survived and coexisted in the area, making the Balkans a "hotspot of biodiversity".

During the Marine Isotope Stage 5 (130,000–80,000 years ago), the Neanderthals thrived. They lived all over the Balkans, including Balanica. In the wider Balanica region, evidence of the Neanderthal presence was discovered in the localities of Pešturina, Meča Dupka, Golema Dupka, and Kremenac, all in the Niš and Leskovac depressions, and on the slopes of the Radan mountain.

Due to its importance, the Balanica complex and the Pešturina cave are sometimes nicknamed Serbian Atapuerca, being compared to the Spanish Atapuerca, On 10 May 2022, the Government of Serbia designated the two Balanica caves as a protected cultural monument. They were officially declared an archaeological site under the name "Locality of Velika and Mala Balanica in Sićevo".

== Location and geography ==
The Balanica caves are located within the Sićevo Gorge, some 100 m (330 ft) away from the last houses in the Sićevo village. The caves are inaccessible by roads or paths and can be reached only via ropes. Access starts at the southern exit from the village of Sićevo, where the ropes descend below the village's football field. The caves are locked and are opened only when excavations are conducted. The entrances into the caves face south, across the gorge, but overlooking to the west, and the wide South Morava Valley. Entrance into the Mala Balanica is at an elevation of 329 m (1,079 ft), while the Velika Balanica's mouth is at 332 m (1,089 ft), or 100 m (330 ft) above the Nišava river, which carved the Sićevo Gorge. The caves represent typical karstic cavities. They are located on the Sićevo's state owned cadastre lot No. 6720/1, on the southern slope of the gorge's Brljaski Kamen section, above the right bank of the Nišava river.

== Discovery ==
The caves in the surroundings of Niš attracted archaeologists already at the end of the 19th century, few decades after science adopted theories of evolution and glaciation. However, Balanica and Pešturina caves were discovered during the survey of the terrain for the construction of the Niš-Dimitrovgrad motorway, at the beginning of the 21st century. Balanica caves were discovered in 2002. Archaeological importance of the caves came to light when the local gold rush hit the area. Gold prospectors used the caves as bivouac shelters. They were discovering abundant quantity of artefacts and various remains, which prompted paleoarchaeologists to begin surveys.

Excavations at Balanica, led by Prof. Dušan Mihailović from the University of Belgrade Faculty of Philosophy, began in 2004 Researchers from the University of Winnipeg, Canada, headed by Mirjana Roksandic, joined the Serbian team in 2009. From the beginning of the research, it was clear that the Balanica cave complex is archaeologically significant, producing numerous artefacts, faunal remains, evidence of combustion, and hominin fossils.

== Mala Balanica ==
=== Geography ===
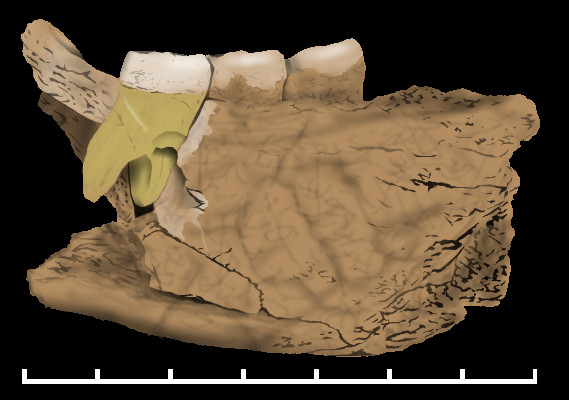
The BH-1 hominin hemi-mandible from Mala Balanica is estimated to be between 397,000 and 525,000 years old.

The entrance is 2 by 1.5 m (6 ft 7 in by 4 ft 11 in), the hall is 12 by 6 m (39 by 20 ft), with average height of 1 m (3 ft 3 in). The maximum height is 2.8 m (9 ft 2 in), while the elongated karstic chamber is 25 m (82 ft) deep.

=== Hominin remains ===
In 2006, a hominin hemi-mandible BH-1 was discovered at Mala Balanica. The CT scanning was conducted to create a 3D image of the mandible, while the U-series method of radiometric dating was originally used to determine the jaw's age. Due to the limitation of the process, and some unusual readings, it was tentatively dated to 113,000+72,000-43,000 years, as older specimen was never discovered in this part of Europe. This was set as the minimum age.

The mandible was excavated in the lower stratigraphic level of the cave, 1.5 m (4 ft 11 in) below the artifact bearing level, or 281 to 284 cm (111 to 112 in) of total depth. It was the first hominin specimen in the Central Balkans recovered through controlled excavations with firm stratigraphic context. The mandible is 6.7 cm (2.6 in) long and preserved from the posterior canine alveolus to the mesial aspect of the ascending ramus. All three molars are present in their sockets. The lower half of the mesiolingual root of the third molar is missing and the remaining roots are exposed due to the destruction of the adjacent endomandibular lamina. The mesial section of the mandible shows an old breakage filled with sediment, whereas all of the breaks on the distal end are fresh.

The presence of the alveolar planum (the distance from the frontmost tooth socket to the back of the jaw), and the overall robusticity indicated a non-modern morphology and primitive character states comparable with the Early Pleistocene. Despite relative geographic proximity and possible contemporaneity with the Krapina Neanderthals, the mandible does not share any observable derived Neanderthal traits. As it didn't appear to be Neanderthal, but more archaic, the mandible was originally described as belonging to Homo sp. Shape of the dental arcade and molar morphology placed the remains in the genus Homo, but its fragmentary nature and plesiomorphic character of its traits precluded a more precise taxonomic designation. However, the 2013 survey which included electron spin resonance combined with uranium series isotopic analysis, and infrared/post-infrared luminescence dating, provided a minimum age between 397,000 and 525,000 years. Measurements have been conducted by the University of Bordeaux in France, and Université du Québec à Montréal in Canada. Though some results, especially of the sediments where the mandible was discovered, showed results of older periods, up to 602,000 years old (582,000 in sediments above the mandible), the researchers concluded from other facts and circumstances that this is probably not the case, settling on the lower range. BH-1 represents a primitive, non-divergent hominin population outside the Neanderthal lineage, consistent with other Chibanian non-Neanderthals from the Eastern Mediterranean. Based on a detailed dental study, BH-1 was assigned to Homo heidelbergensis sensu lato. However, BH-1 was subsequently tentatively proposed as a member of the African Middle Pleistocene (Chibanian) species "Homo bodoensis".

Even the lower range places Mala Balanica among the oldest hominin fossils in the European Middle Pleistocene. Its older estimate is slightly younger than Mauer 1 in Germany (609,000 BP± 40,000). Younger minimum age limit is close to the ages of Sima de los Huesos hominins in Spain (about 430,000 years ago), Arago in France (435,000 BP± 85,000) and Visogliano in Italy (350,000–500,000). It is somewhat older than Ceprano (353,000 BP± 4,000), also in Italy. As for the surrounding region, there are only several other Middle Pleistocene sites which yielded hominin fossils—such as Petralona and Apidima, both in Greece—but these are likely notably younger.

== Velika Balanica ==
=== Archaeology ===
Velika Balanica is a relatively large cave, covering 400 m^{2} (4,300 sq ft), of which 30 m^{2} (320 sq ft) is surveyed. The entrance is 1.5 by 2 by 2 m (4 ft 11 in by 6 ft 7 in by 6 ft 7 in), while the entry hall is 9 by 2 by 2 m (29.5 by 6.6 by 6.6 ft). Originally, 160 m^{2} (1,700 sq ft) was accessible, with several buried corridors which lead into further, later uncovered, halls. A 3 m (9.8 ft) deep stratigraphic sequence is divided in 5 layers (1 to 5), which are divided into further sub-levels (2a, 2a2, 2a3, 2b, 2c, 3a-3c, 4a-4d, 5a-5d). Level 1 is sterile. Typical Mousterian artefacts are found throughout the 2nd layer, while the Charentian industries were discovered in the entire layer 3. Layers 4 and 5 are still being surveyed.

Lithic assemblages from the Charentian period in both caves, and remains of microfauna, suggest that layer 3a corresponds to the late Middle Pleistocene, probably the interglacial Marine Isotope Stages 9 or 7. Taking into the account the Proto-Charentian character of industry, and parallels with Karain Cave in Turkey, this would put the layer 3a at 330,000–300,000 BP.

=== Fauna ===
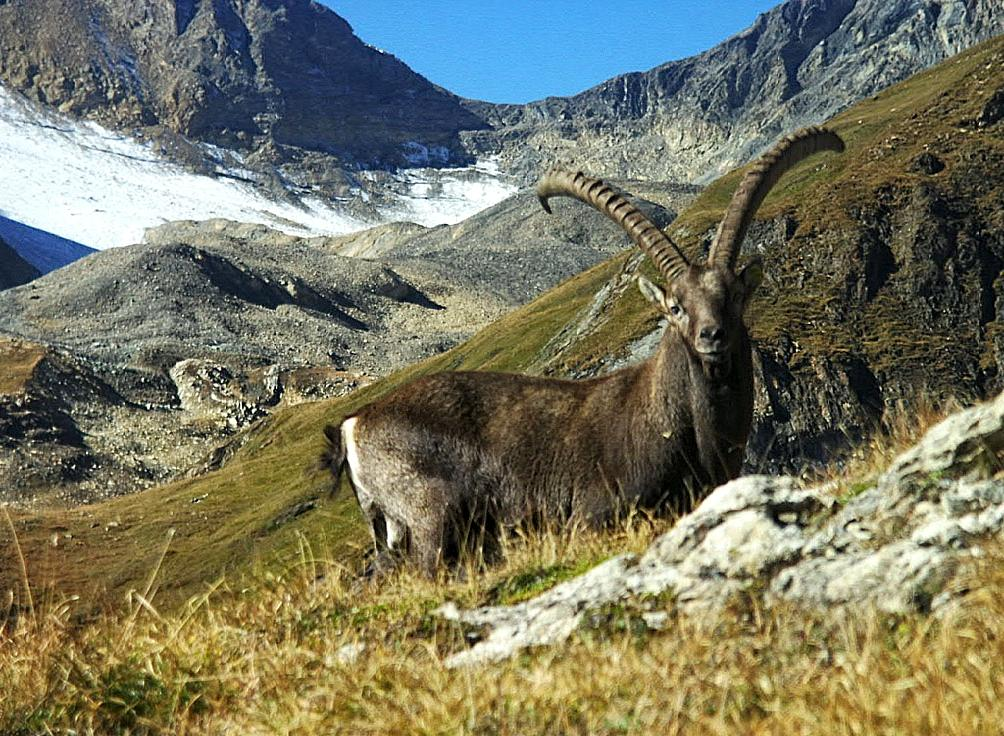
Remains of the cliff-dwelling Alpine ibex are the most abundant in the caves. The ibex has since gone extinct in this part of Europe

Until 2014, over 10,000 animal bone remains were discovered, but due to the extreme fragmentation, over 86% is non-identifiable being shorter than 3 cm (1.2 in). Among herbivores, the most represented are the remains of Alpine ibex and red deer, followed by chamois. They are present in all layers' 2 and 3 sub-layers. Bones of forest rhinoceros are found in some of the sub-levels of both layers, while wild horse, aurochs and steppe bison are represented only in the layer 3. Carnivores are much less represented, including remains of European wildcat in sub-layer 2a, cave bear in 2a and 2-b, and wolf in 3b and 3c. Remains of red fox were also found.

Based on the topographic cliff-like location of the cave, abundance of ibex and chamois remains is expected. Predators belong to the typical grassland and forested environments, which corresponds to the moderate temperatures and presumed paleo-environment in the interglacial Marine Isotope Stages 7 to 9. It is believed that primary food source were deer and ibex, while other large fauna had secondary role. This points to a certain level of specialization in hunting, with focus on more productive animals. Sub-layer 2 indicate summer use of the cave and a clearly specialized economy which included summer hunting of young deer, grazing in herds in the Morava's fluvial plain. These localities are some 5 km (3.1 mi) to the south-southwest. By contrast, ibex and chamois were living around the site, on the gorge's cliffs. This points to the low role of large mammals in diet, which is generally narrow and heavily influenced by the location of the cave.

Unlike other Neanderthal groups, the main focus of Balanica residents was not the large game, as those animals lived in the river plains, far from the cave, which caused logistic problems of transporting large carcasses back into the cave. Failure in developing efficient transportation strategy of large animals may indicate sub-optimal behavior. Consequently, the paleo-economy practiced by the inhabitants of Velika Balanica was less efficient than the one observed in other Upper Paleolithic records. Still, the logistic mobility of the settlers was apparently rather high, which points to the intense residential use of the cave.

The taphonomical analysis points towards an anthropogenic origin of the deposit—that is, the remains were brought into the cave by humans, rather than animals living and dying in the cave. Biostratinomic and diagenetic alterations in the assemblage include the abundance of butchery and breakage marks, with thermoalterations (treatment by fire) confirming this. There is abundant evidence (including fragmentation and use of fire) of marrow extraction. Long bones of red deer and ibex were particularly intensively exploited for the extraction of marrow grease.

=== Tools ===
Analysis of the skeletal assemblage—comprising 77% appendicular skeleton, 15% teeth, 14% axial skeleton, 9% heads—indicates a predominance of high-utility body parts. The tools found in association with the hominin remains are nearly identical to those from contemporaneous Middle Paleolithic sites in the Middle East, suggesting contact or even intermingling between the two populations. The Middle Paleolithic layers also yielded numerous lithic artefacts, faunal remains, and hearths. Among the tools were implements likely used for hide processing, including grattoirs de côté of the Quina type.

Stone tools from the Velika and Mala Balanica caves exhibit a distinctive combination of features, including large flakes with at least one blunt margin, characteristic scalar Quina retouch, extensive reworking of scrapers, and a marked predominance of scrapers within the assemblage. These traits are absent in contemporaneous assemblages from the surrounding region. Instead, they closely resemble the Yabrudian facies of the Acheulo-Yabrudian complex in Southwest Asia. This strong technological affinity suggests population movement and potential cultural interactions between the Levant and the Balkans during the Middle Pleistocene.

The tools were used in the butchering of animals, including skinning, dismembering, and defleshing, as evidenced by cut marks—primarily on limb bones, which comprise 90% of the modified specimens. Approximately 30% of the total bone assemblage was intentionally fractured while still fresh, resulting in oblique fracture angles and curved break profiles. Many bones display evidence of hammerstone percussion, including flake scars and splintering. Nearly one third of the bones show signs of burning. This high frequency of burnt remains may reflect intensive cooking practices or the cleaning and maintenance of living surfaces within the cave.

=== Hominin remains ===
During the summer of 2017, four hominin fossil teeth (specimens BH-2, BH-3, BH-4, and BH-5) were discovered, the first of which was found by archaeology student Ljubica Stajić. The remains belong to at least two individuals: an adult (BH-2 and BH-5) and a child (BH-3 and BH-4). Dental morphology—particularly that of the well-preserved upper first molar BH-4—indicates affinities with Neanderthals, especially with early representatives such as the 430,000-year-old hominins from Sima de los Huesos in Atapuerca, Spain. Thermoluminescence dating of burned flint samples from the layer which yielded the hominin remains provided two dates: 285 ± 34 ka and 295 ± 74 ka. Approximately 300,000 years old, the hominin remains from Velika Balanica are firmly Middle Pleistocene and represent the oldest known Neanderthal fossils outside of Western Europe, suggesting significant eastward migration—possibly into the Eastern Mediterranean region. They also constitute the second-oldest hominin remains in Serbia, after those from Mala Balanica. Contextually, the teeth were recovered in association with a hearth, within archaeological layer 3a. Morphological analysis revealed strong similarities to the 430,000-year-old early Neanderthal fossils from Sima de los Huesos in Atapuerca, Spain. Four additional hominin dental specimens (BH-7, BH-8, BH-15, and BH-16), originating from Layers 3a and 3b of the cave, were published in 2025, reinforcing the evidence for early Neanderthal presence at Velika Balanica.

== Assessment ==
Balkan Peninsula served as a transit route for humans and their ancestors since the dawn of mankind

The Middle Pleistocene is becoming increasingly recognized as an important interval in the biocultural evolution of humans. Characteristics of the period include larger brain size, controlled use of fire, temperate zone geographic dispersals, varieties of prepared core lithic reduction techniques, development of effective weaponry (both predatory and defensive), and regional differentiation of human populations. Remains in Velika Balanica make it one of the oldest localities in Europe where transition from the Lower to Middle Paleolithic is recorded. The transition was marked by the controlled use of fire, and organized hunting. This corresponds with sudden elevation of cognitive abilities of human ancestors, and the process of encephalization.

The Middle and Late Pleistocene specimens from western Europe show derived Neandertal traits, however, this is different for the eastern and the southern Europe. It appears that Mediterranean peninsulas served as areas of refuge, potentially playing an important role in maintaining the variability of hominins in the continent, by a combination of migratory pulses and in situ evolution. Hence, population of Europe in the Pleistocene may have been more complex than previously thought. Based on the fossil records, the reasons may include any number of different genetic processes including drift, founder effect, directional adaptation and hybridization.

The remains coincide with the period when humans began their permanent presence in Europe. Unlike Western European hominins, remains from Mala Balanica show no derived Neanderthal traits. It indicates that in colder periods, the Balkans wasn't isolated from the rest of Eurasia, like the western Europe was. Scientists predicted that at some point hominin remains would also be discovered in Velka Balanica, which happened in 2017. The Balkans served not only as a refugium in the ice age periods, but after the glaciers retreated, contributed to 80% of animal and plant species that repopulated Western Europe, and 100% of all the species that repopulated Eastern Europe.

The findings in both Balanica caves point to possible contact between the Balkans and Southwest Asian hominin populations some 300,000 to 240,000 years ago. A number of questions remain open: What was the exact method of dissemination of the cultural innovations? Were those migrations of people or exchange of ideas, and who was the initial carrier of the original technologies? At this moment, it is not even clear which species of hominins made contact. It could be meeting of European and Southwest Asian Neanderthals, or the meeting of regional Neanderthals with ancestors of modern humans.

The mandible from Mala Balanica is the easternmost hominin specimen in Europe dated to the Middle Pleistocene. Inferences drawn from the morphology place it outside currently observed variation of European Homo heidelbergensis. The lack of derived Neandertal traits, comparison to the contemporary specimens in Southeast Europe, like Kocabaş, Visogliano and Ceprano, and coupled with Middle Pleistocene synapomorphies, suggest different evolutionary forces shaped ancient residents in the east of the continent where isolation did not play such an important role during glaciations.

Excavations are ongoing in both caves, as the bedrock still has not been reached. The hominin remains are permanently curated at the National Museum of Serbia in Belgrade.

== Protection ==
On 10 May 2012, the Government of Serbia issued Decision No. 05 633–2762/2012, placing the caves under protection as the "Locality of Velika and Mala Balanica in Sićevo." They were officially designated as an archaeological site and immovable cultural monument. The decision was published in the Official Gazette of the Republic of Serbia, No. 50/12, on 18 May 2012. On 28 May 2012, the site was entered into the local register of the Institute for the Protection of Cultural Monuments in Niš under the designation AN 53, with the Institute assuming responsibility for managing the protected area. It was subsequently included in the national register of cultural monuments on 17 August 2012, under the designation AN 165.

== See also ==
- Pešturina

== Sources ==
- Ćosin, Jelena (23 July 2017). "Tragovi pračoveka u pećinama Sićeva" [Traces of hominins in the caves of Sićevo]. Večernje Novosti (in Serbian). Belgrade.
- Cultural monuments (2022). Локалитет Велика и Мала Баланица у Сићеву [Locality Velika and Mala Balanica in Sićevo]. Belgrade: Informational system of immovable cultural monuments.
- Marin-Arroyo, Ana B. (2014). "Middle Pleistocene subsistence in Velika Balanica, Serbia: Preliminary results". Palaeolithic and Mesolithic Research in the Central Balkans.
- Rink, William J.; Mercier, Norbert; Mihailović, Dušan; Morley, Mike W.; Thompson, Jeroen W.; Roksandic, Mirjana (6 February 2013). "New Radiometric Ages for the BH-1 Hominin from Balanica (Serbia): Implications for Understanding the Role of the Balkans in Middle Pleistocene Human Evolution". PLOS ONE. 8 (2) e54608. Bibcode:2013PLoSO...854608R. doi:10.1371/journal.pone.0054608. PMC 3566111. PMID 23405085.
- Roksandic, Mirjana; Mihailović, Dušan; Mercier, Norbert; Dimitrijević, Vesna; Morley, Mike W.; Rakočević, Zoran; Mihailović, Bojana; Guibert, Pierre; Babb, Jeff (2 August 2011). "A human mandible (BH-1) from the Pleistocene deposits of Mala Balanica cave (Sićevo Gorge, Niš, Serbia)". Journal of Human Evolution. 61 (2): 186–196. Bibcode:2011JHumE..61..186R. doi:10.1016/j.jhevol.2011.03.003. PMID 21507461.
- Roksandic, Mirjana; Radović, Predrag; Lindal, Joshua; Mihailović, Dušan (May 2022). "Early Neanderthals in contact: The Chibanian (Middle Pleistocene) hominin dentition from Velika Balanica Cave, Southern Serbia". Journal of Human Evolution. 166 103175. Bibcode:2022JHumE.16603175R. doi:10.1016/j.jhevol.2022.103175. PMID 35339947. S2CID 247688781.
- Rosić, Staša (17 April 2022). "Neandertalci sa prostora današnje Srbije: Arheološka blaga koja krije Sićevačka klisura" [Neanderthals from the area of modern Serbiq: Archaeological treasures hidden in Sićevo Gorge] (in Serbian). Belgrade: Euronews.
- Skinner, Matthew M.; de Vries, Dorien; Gunz, Philipp; Kupczik, Kornelius; Klassen, R. Paul; Hublin, Jean-Jacques; Roksandic, Mirjana (April 2016). "A dental perspective on the taxonomic affinity of the Balanica mandible (BH-1)". Journal of Human Evolution. 93: 63–81. Bibcode:2016JHumE..93...63S. doi:10.1016/j.jhevol.2016.01.010. PMID 27086056.
- Službeni List (10 May 2012). Одлука о утврђивању локалитета Велика и Мала Баланица у Сићеву за археолошко налазиште [Decision on declaring a locality of Velika and Mala Balanica in Sićevo an archaeological site] (PDF). State Gazette of the Republic of Serbia No. 50/12.
- Todorović, Toma (8 April 2022). "Praljudi živeli u Sićevačkoj klisuri" [Ancient hominins lived in Sićevo Gorge]. Politika (in Serbian). Belgrade. p. 12.
- University of Winnipeg (31 March 2022). "Neanderthals from The Balkans had cultural ties to Levant 300,000 years ago". Winnipeg.
