= Mirjana Roksandic =

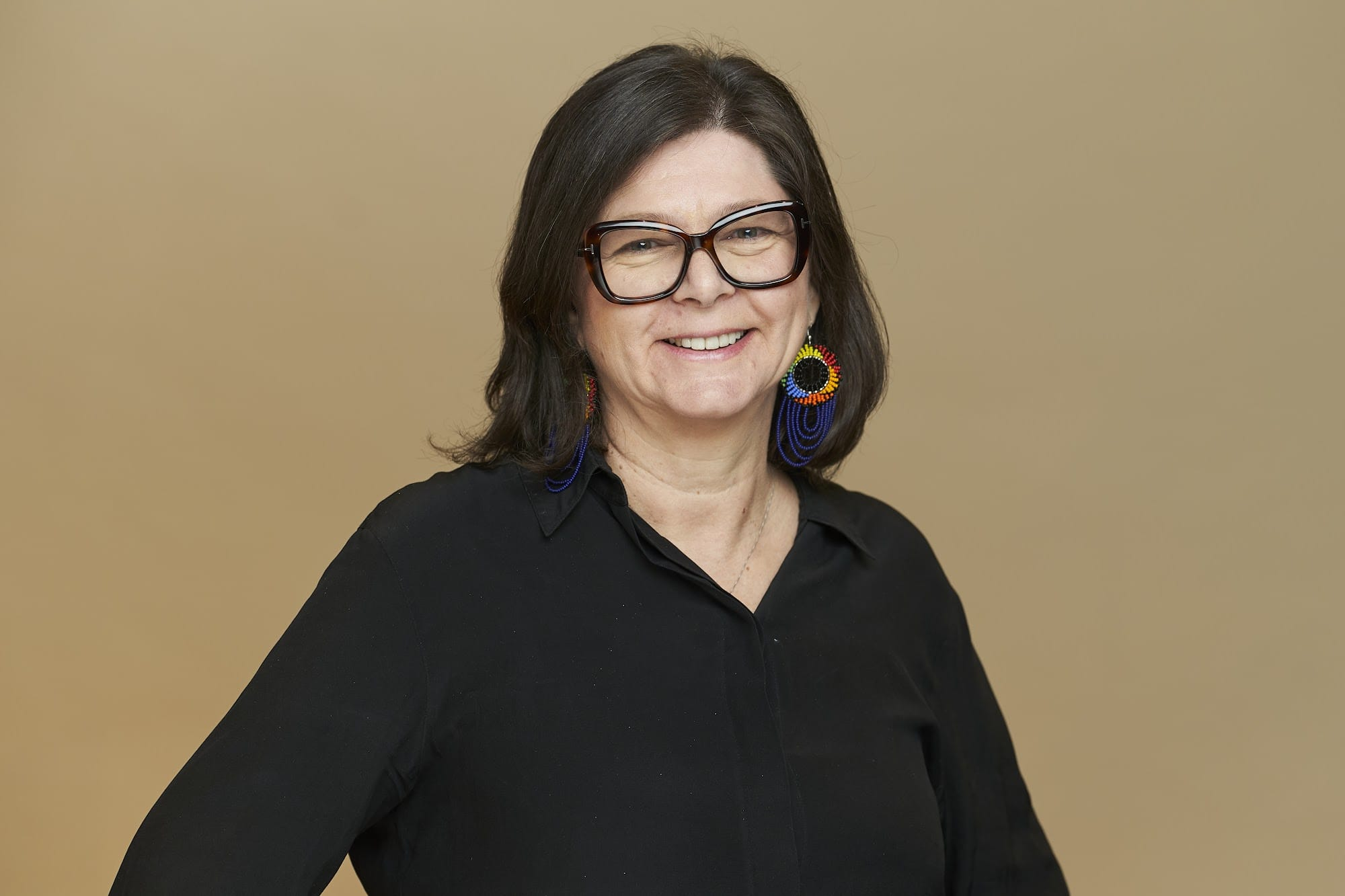
- Occupation(s): paleoanthropologist and professor
- Employer: University of Winnipeg

Mirjana Roksandic is a Professor in the Department of Anthropology and coordinator of the interdisciplinary program in Bioanthropology at The University of Winnipeg and graduate faculty at the University of Manitoba. Her main research topics include Pleistocene hominin evolution in Europe and in particular Eastern Mediterranean and mortuary ritual among sedentary and semi-sedentary archaeological hunter-gatherers. She has two active international projects: one in Serbia focusing on hominins excavated in Paleolithic caves, and the other in Cuba and Nicaragua where she is working on questions of mortuary practice and ritual continuity in the Caribbean. She is interested in when, how, and why humans have moved across continents and vast expanses of lands and sea in the context of adaptation to climatic fluctuations and social pressures. Prof. Roksandic is a recipient of NSERC and SSHRC grants, and the recipient of the Nellie McClung Foundation Manitoba Women Trailblazer Award.

== Education ==
She has a Ph.D. from Simon Fraser University.

== Academic career ==
Roksandic is a professor at the University of Winnipeg and supervises graduate students through the University of Manitoba and international collaborations. She founded the Palaeoanthropological Society of Canada/Société canadienne de paléoanthropologie and served as its first president, helping grow its membership and organize academic meetings. She is a Scientific Board member at CENIEH and has been involved in major international collaborations, including projects funded by the European Research Council and national science foundations in Serbia, Germany, and Spain.

== Research ==
Her research spans the Balkans, East Africa, and the Caribbean. Roksandic is known for naming the human species Homo bodoensis, contributing to a major taxonomic revision in paleoanthropology. She has argued for the removal of problematic historical names like Homo rhodesiensis and called for more ethical and inclusive taxonomic practices.

In 2023, she co-organized a workshop in Novi Sad, Serbia, focusing on Middle Pleistocene hominins. This event culminated in a collaborative paper addressing the complexities of hominin taxonomy during this period.

She has led several major international research projects, receiving nearly $4 million in funding from Canadian federal agencies such as NSERC and SSHRC. Her work in the Balkans uncovered some of the oldest hominin fossils in Southeastern Europe, including the BH-1 mandible from the Mala Balanica cave in Sićevo Gorge (Serbia). Her findings have reshaped views of Pleistocene human diversity in Europe.

Roksandic integrates fieldwork, 3D modeling, molecular anthropology, and geospatial technologies in her research.

== Impact and recognition ==
Her work has significantly influenced the understanding of hominin diversity and movements in Europe and has drawn attention to underrepresented research areas such as the Balkans and Caribbean. She has given keynote lectures at international conferences, delivered dozens of invited public lectures, and published widely in top journals.

In 2021, she received the Manitoba Women Trailblazer Award from the Nellie McClung Foundation. She has also been involved in creative science communication, including visual reconstructions of human ancestors and a podcast on human evolution in film.

== Publications ==
- Roksandic, Mirjana; Radović, Predrag; Wu, Xiu-Jie; Bae, Christopher J. (2021). "Resolving the "muddle in the middle": The case for Homo bodoensis sp. nov". Evolutionary Anthropology: Issues, News, and Reviews. 31 (1): 20–29. doi:10.1002/evan.21929. ISSN 1520-6505. PMC 9297855. PMID 34710249. S2CID 240152672.
- Roksandic, Mirjana. "Early Neanderthals in contact: The Chibanian (Middle Pleistocene) hominin dentition from Velika Balanica Cave, Southern Serbia". Journal of Human Evolution. 166: 103175.
