= Nišava =

Nišava (Nishava, Нишава)
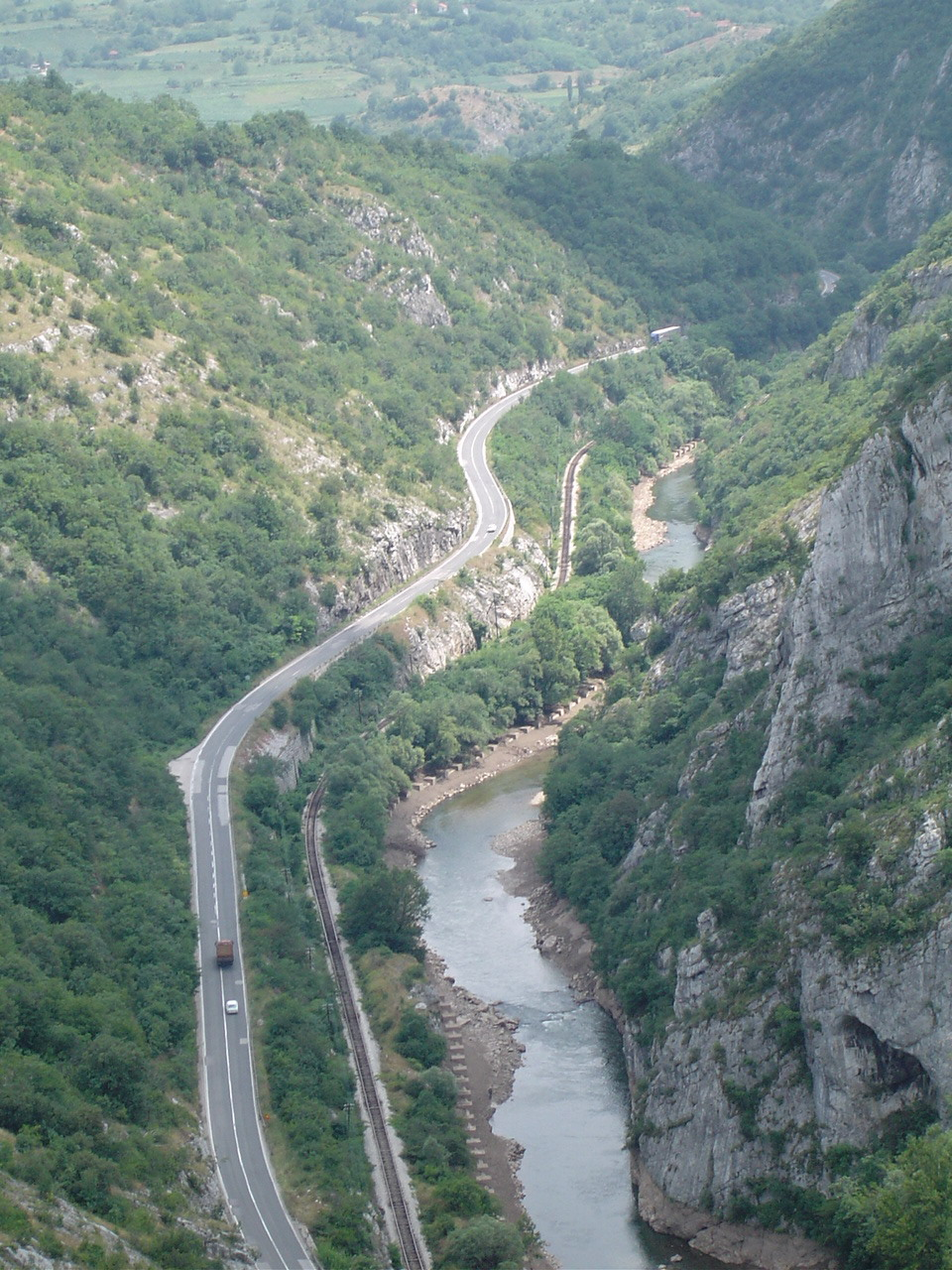
- The Sićevo Gorge, eastern Serbia

Location
- Country: Bulgaria, Serbia

Physical characteristics
- Source
  - location: Bulgaria, Stara Planina mountains
- Mouth
  - location: Južna Morava, west of Niš, Serbia
  - coordinates: 43°22′14″N 21°46′08″E
- Length: 218 km (135 mi)
- Basin size: 4,086 km^{2} (1,578 sq mi)
- Discharge
  - average: 36 m^{3}/s (1,300 cu ft/s) at the mouth

Basin features
- Progression: South Morava→ Great Morava→ Danube→ Black Sea

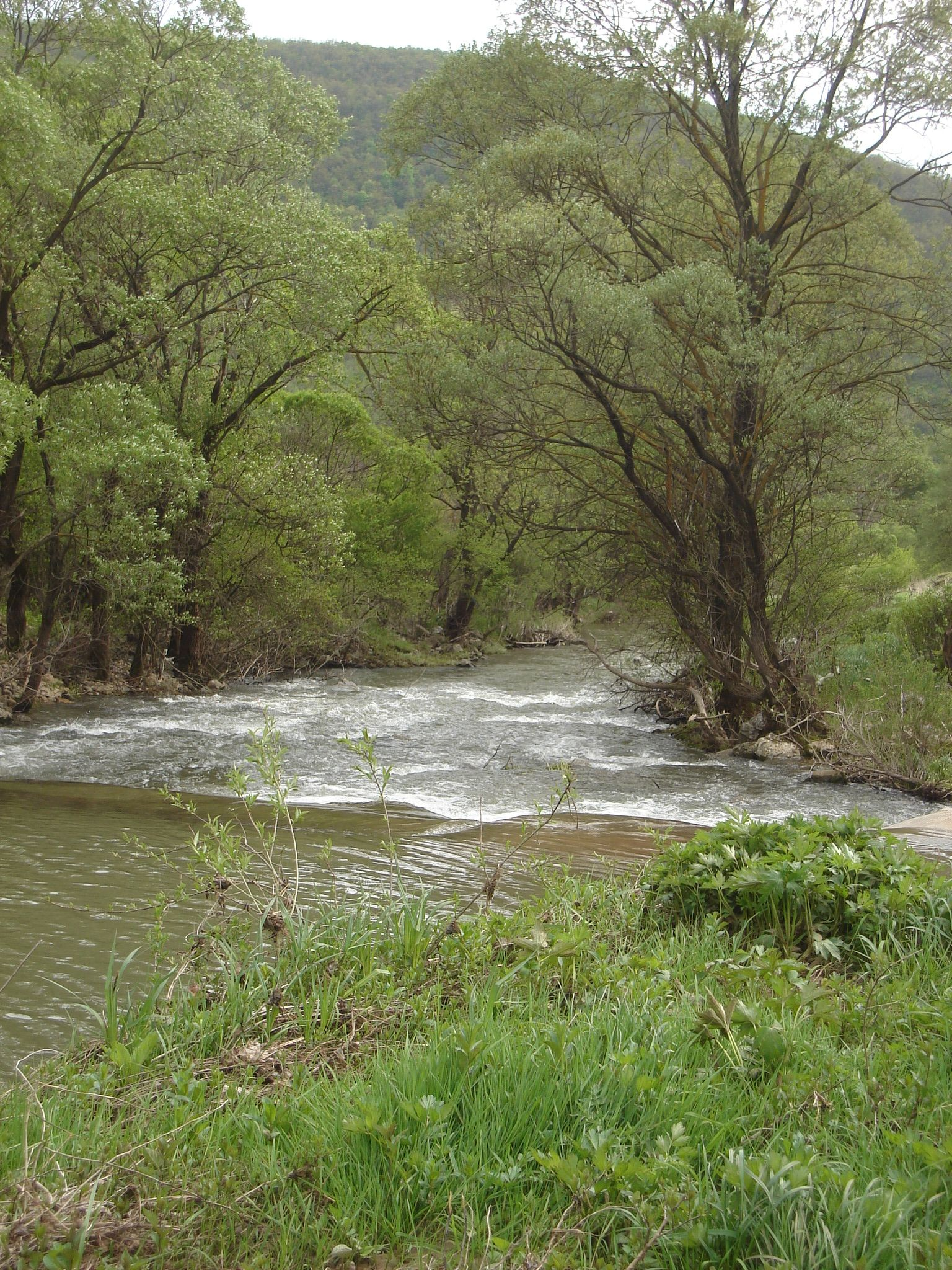
The Nišava before Kalotina in Bulgaria

The Nišava or Nishava (Bulgarian and Serbian Cyrillic: Нишава, Serbian pronunciation: [nǐʃaʋa]) is a river in Bulgaria and Serbia, a right tributary, and with a length of 218 kilometres (135 mi) also the longest one, of the South Morava.

== Course ==
=== Bulgaria ===
The Nišava originates in western Bulgaria, in the Stara Planina mountains (east of Kom Peak) near the village of Gintsi. Its source is close to the Serbian border. It enters Serbia after 67 kilometres (42 mi) of flow through Bulgaria without receiving any major tributaries.

Because it flows through Gintsi, the upper course of the river is known as Ginska (Cyrillic: Гинска). It first flows to the south, then sharply turns west into the Godech Kettle, passing through Razboishte, after which it forms a gorge. Coming out of the gorge, it reaches Kalotina, a major border crossing on the Bulgarian-Serbian border (Kalotina-Gradina), and continues west into Serbia.

=== Serbia ===
Flowing generally to the west for the remaining 151 kilometres (94 mi), it passes near Dimitrovgrad, Pirot, Bela Palanka, Niška Banja and Niš, one of the largest cities in Serbia, 10 kilometres (6.2 mi) after which the Nišava empties into the Južna Morava. With the rapid growth of Niš in previous decades and its still fast growing suburbs, the banks of the Nišava are urbanized almost to its mouth.

== Geography ==
The river belongs to the Black Sea drainage basin. Its own drainage area covers 4,086 square kilometres (1,578 sq mi), of which about 73% is in Serbia, the rest in Bulgaria. The Nišava is not navigable. It is not only the longest tributary of the Južna Morava, but also the largest one in terms of discharge (36 metres per second (120 ft/s)). It has many smaller tributaries, the most important being the Temštica from the right, and the Jerma (or Sukovska reka), Crvena reka, Koritnička reka and Kutinska reka from the left.

In its Serbian part, the Nišava has carved a composite valley with several depressions (Dimitrovgrad, Pirot (or Basara; Cyrillic: Басара), Bela Palanka and Niš). However, the most prominent geological feature the river has formed is the Sićevo Gorge. There are numerous caves in the step-like limestone cliffs, the majority of which remains unexplored.

=== Sićevo Gorge ===
The gorge is located between Bela Palanka and Niška Banja. The gorge is 17 kilometres (11 mi) long, and 350 to 400 metres (1,150 to 1,310 ft) deep. The gorge is a composite one, which means in consists of several gorges and widenings, like the Prosečka gorge, Ostrovička basin or Gradištanski canyon.

The river is quite powerful in the gorge, which is used for two power stations ("Sićevo" and "Ostrovica") used for electricity production, irrigation and fishery. The plants are old, from the first half of the 20th century. "Sićevo" was built in 1909 as "Sveta Petka", and was declared a cultural monument. In some parts canyon like-structures (like inverse valley slopes at Gradištanski canyon) were formed by the river. The gorge itself carved through the Kunovica plateau between the southern slopes of the Mountains of Svrljig and the mountain of Suva Planina, and the surrounding areas are known for their high-quality vineyards. There is also a large Ostrovica quarry in the gorge, where six villages are located, the largest one being Sićevo that gives the name to the whole gorge.

== Wildlife ==
The Oblik rise, above the Sićevo gorge, is a location where extremely rare plants Serbian ramonda and Natalie's ramonda can be found.

Trouts can be find on the entire river's course, with their number varying over the years. Over 100 bird species live only in the gorge section, including golden eagle.

== Human history ==
North of the river, in the Sićevo gorge, excavations in the Mala Balanica cave began in 2005. Mousterian stone tools from the Middle Paleolithic were discovered until 2009. Numerous animal remains were discovered in the same layer, up to 30 centimetres (12 in) deep. A hominid mandible was discovered at the depth of 1.5 metres (4 ft 11 in) in 2007. It is concluded that it belongs to a young adult person, though the sex can't be specified. Originally believed to be 200,000 to 300,000 years old, during the 2013 examination of the remains it was estimated that the lower jaw was not younger than 397,000 years, and probably older than 525,000 years, which makes it one of the oldest discovered remains of the Homo heidelbergensis in Europe. Later, only 50 metres (160 ft) further from this finding, remains of Neanderthals were discovered. Four teeth belonged to one adult and one child, and are estimated to be 300,000 years old. It was suggested that some kind of contact of different species of humans happened in the region, one group being from Europe, and the other coming from Asia Minor.

On the southern side of the river, on the Suva Planina, there is a Pešturina cave, nicknamed the "Serbian Atapuerca". Artifacts from the Middle and Upper Paleolithic were discovered since the archaeological excavations began in 2006. The remains, identified as the Mousterian culture, were dated from 102,000 BP+ 5,000 to 39,000 BP + 3,000, which makes Pešturina one of the latest surviving Neanderthal habitats. In April 2019 it was announced that the remains of the Neanderthal man have been discovered. It is the first discovery of Neanderthal remains in Serbia. All Paleolithic sites in the Central Balkans, including discoveries in the Nišava valley, have the noticeable absence of the Aurignacian layers. That points to the theory that the expansion of the early modern humans into Europe occurred via the Danube corridor, which allowed for the small Neanderthal communities to survive beyond 40,000 BP in some isolated pockets.

The Celts called it a Fairy river. The valley of the river is rich in Byzantine artefacts, and many monasteries, active, or in ruins.

The Nišava valley is part of a major natural route that from ancient times has connected Europe and Asia: the route follows the valleys of the Morava, Nišava and Maritsa and onwards towards Constantinople, present-day Istanbul. During the Roman period, the road was known as Via Militaris, and later as the Tsarigrad Road. Both the Belgrade-Sofia-Istanbul road and the railway follow this route.

== Importance ==
After being divided into districts in 1992, the Nišava District (with Niš as administrative center) is named after the river. Nishava Cove in Rugged Island in the South Shetland Islands, Antarctica is named after Nišava.

In 2008, cultivation of various aromatic and medicinal herbs began in the Serbian section of the Nišava watershed and the valleys of its tributaries. In time, lavender became the major crop, spreading on numerous hills and mountain slopes. Other herbs include Roman chamomile, dwarf everlast, lemon balm, hyssop and Damask rose. Modified Mediterranean micro-climate in the valley, spreading from Greece and North Macedonia through the Niš and Leskovac basins in the South Morava valley, suits the herbs, so as the ph-neutral limestone terrain and altitude from 450 to 550 metres (1,480 to 1,800 ft). Numerous eco-plantations and oil distilleries were built. By 2020, the region became known as Serbian Provence.

The region was famous for its vineyards, which were neglected for a long time, but by the 2020s they also experienced new boom. Planting of orchards also expanded. In some parts of the valley, lemon and banana trees are planted. The area used to be known for sirene production, too. Number of once popular breed of Svrljig sheep dwindled.

== Sources ==
- Mala Prosvetina Enciklopedija, Third edition (1985); Prosveta; ISBN 86-07-00001-2
- Jovan Đ. Marković (1990): Enciklopedijski geografski leksikon Jugoslavije; Svjetlost-Sarajevo; ISBN 86-01-02651-6
