= Pešturina =

Cave and archaeological site in Serbia

- Пештурина
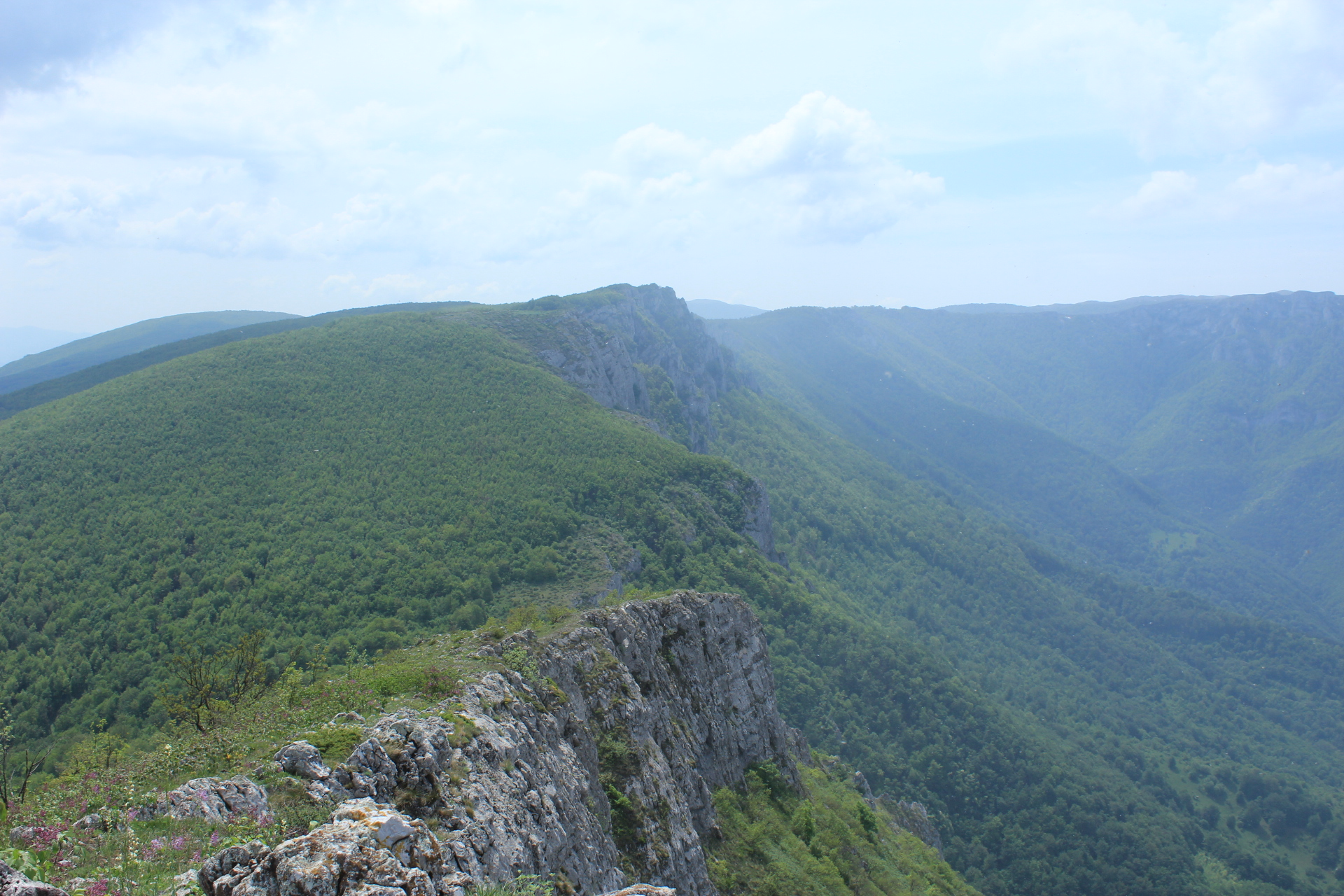
- Suva Planina, mountain on which the Pešturina cave is located

- Location within Serbia
- Coordinates: 43°10′N 21°54′E
- Length: 22 m (72 ft)
- Geology: Limestone
- Entrances: 1
- Difficulty: Hard
- Hazards: Cliffs
- Access: Only for surveys
- Cave survey: Since 2006

Pešturina (Serbian: Пештурина) is a cave in the municipality of Niška Banja in southeast Serbia. It is located southwest of Jelašnica and 20 km (12 mi) southeast of Niš. Artifacts from the Middle and Upper Paleolithic periods were discovered since the archaeological excavations began in 2006. The remains, identified as the Mousterian culture, were dated from 111,000 BP+ 5,000 to 39,000 BP + 3,000, which makes Pešturina one of the latest surviving Neanderthal habitats. The cave has been nicknamed the "Serbian Atapuerca".

In April 2019 it was announced that the Neanderthal remains have been discovered. It is the first discovery of Neanderthal remains in Serbia. With remains of anatomically modern Homo sapiens discovered soon after, Pešturina became the only site in the Central Balkans which preserved both modern human and Neanderthal remains, with associated lithic industries, highlighting the importance of Pešturina in the current discourse on hominin dispersals and migrations.

== Name ==
Coming from the archaic Serbian name for cave, peštera (cf. Pešter) means the "great cave". It is also known as the Jelašnica Cave (Serbian: Јелашничка пећина, Jelašnička pećina).

== Geology ==
The cave is located on the hillock on the northern slopes of the Suva Planina mountain at an altitude of 330 m (1,080 ft). The entrance is oriented to the west; it is 15 m (49 ft) wide and 3.5 m (11 ft) high. The cave itself is 22 m (72 ft) long. Stones are accumulated at the entrance; while the parent rock protrudes above the ground in the back part of the cave. Pešturina is the karst cave, set in the Upper Jurassic dolomites/reef limestones.

Pešturina is one of three caves in a row, the other two being Mala Balanica and Velika Balanica. All three contain hominid remains, the latter two much older: 300,000 and 500,000 years old, respectively. The caves are completely inaccessible by roads or paths and can be reached only via ropes from the village of Sićevo's southern exit. The ropes descend below the village's football field. The caves are locked and are opened only when excavations are conducted. The importance of the caves became apparent at the turn of the 21st century, when the area was engulfed in localized gold rush. Gold prospectors slept in caves, using them as bivouac shelters. They were discovering more and more abundant quantity of artifacts and various remains, which prompted paleoarchaeologists to survey the area.

== Excavations ==
Pešturina has been excavated on three occasions.

- 2006 - The back of the cave was explored, where a trench (or probe) was dug. The search yielded artifacts from later prehistory on top, rock blades and numerous bones in the central, light-brown sediment, while the lowest section, at the depth of 1.3 m (4 ft 3 in), was estimated to be from the Middle Paleolithic. At that level the parent rock was reached so the excavation stopped.
- In 2008 and 2010-2012 the remaining sections were explored. The thickest sediments are near the entrance. The depth reached so far is 2 m (6 ft 7 in) and the bedrock still hasn't been hit.

By 2020, a total of 24 m^{2} (260 sq ft) was surveyed, reaching depth of 3 m (9.8 ft).

== Layers ==
Stratigraphically, the site has been divided in four layers.

=== Layer 1 ===
Humus layer - It contains objects from later prehistory.

=== Layer 2 ===
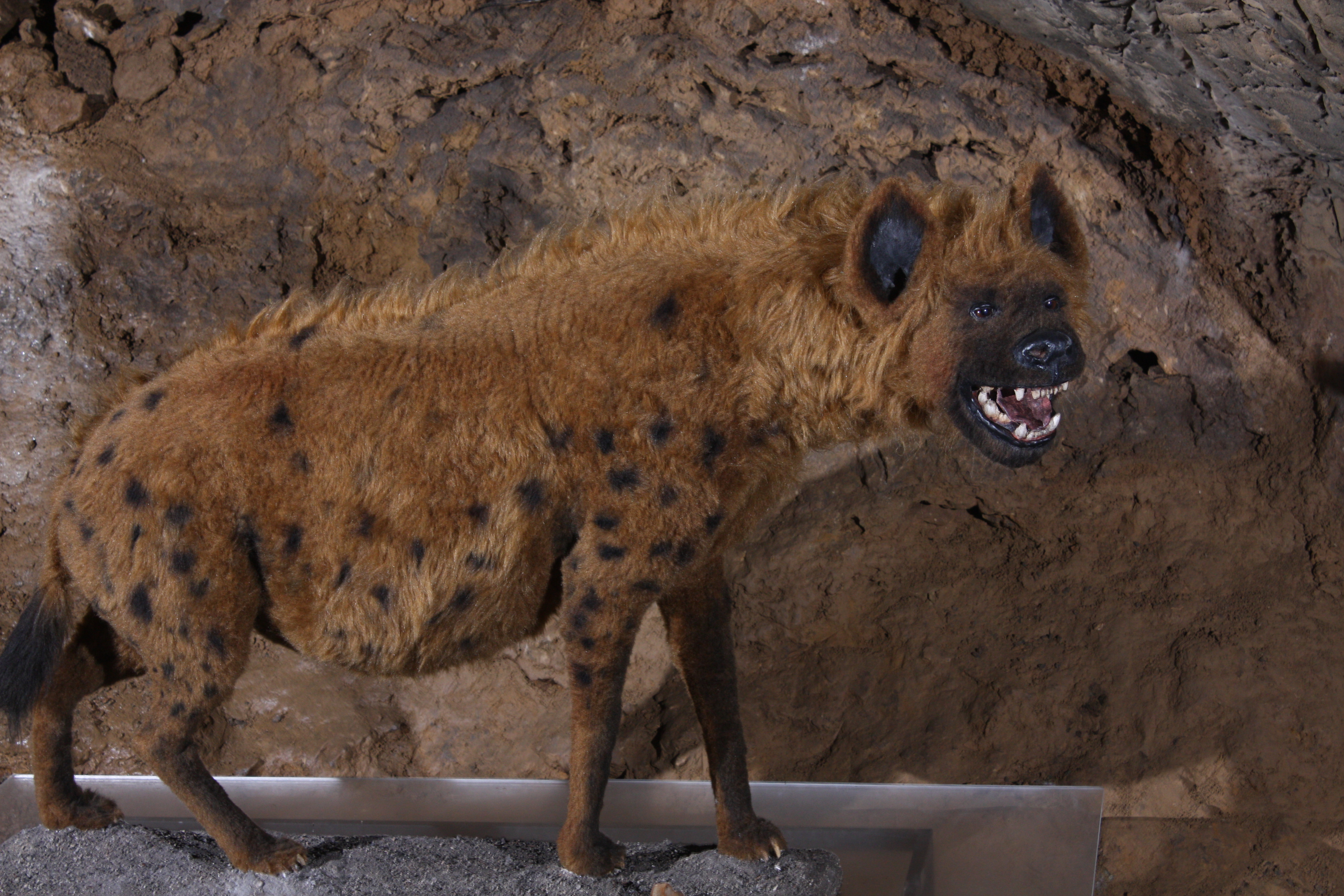
Most abundant remains of the predator species belong to cave hyena

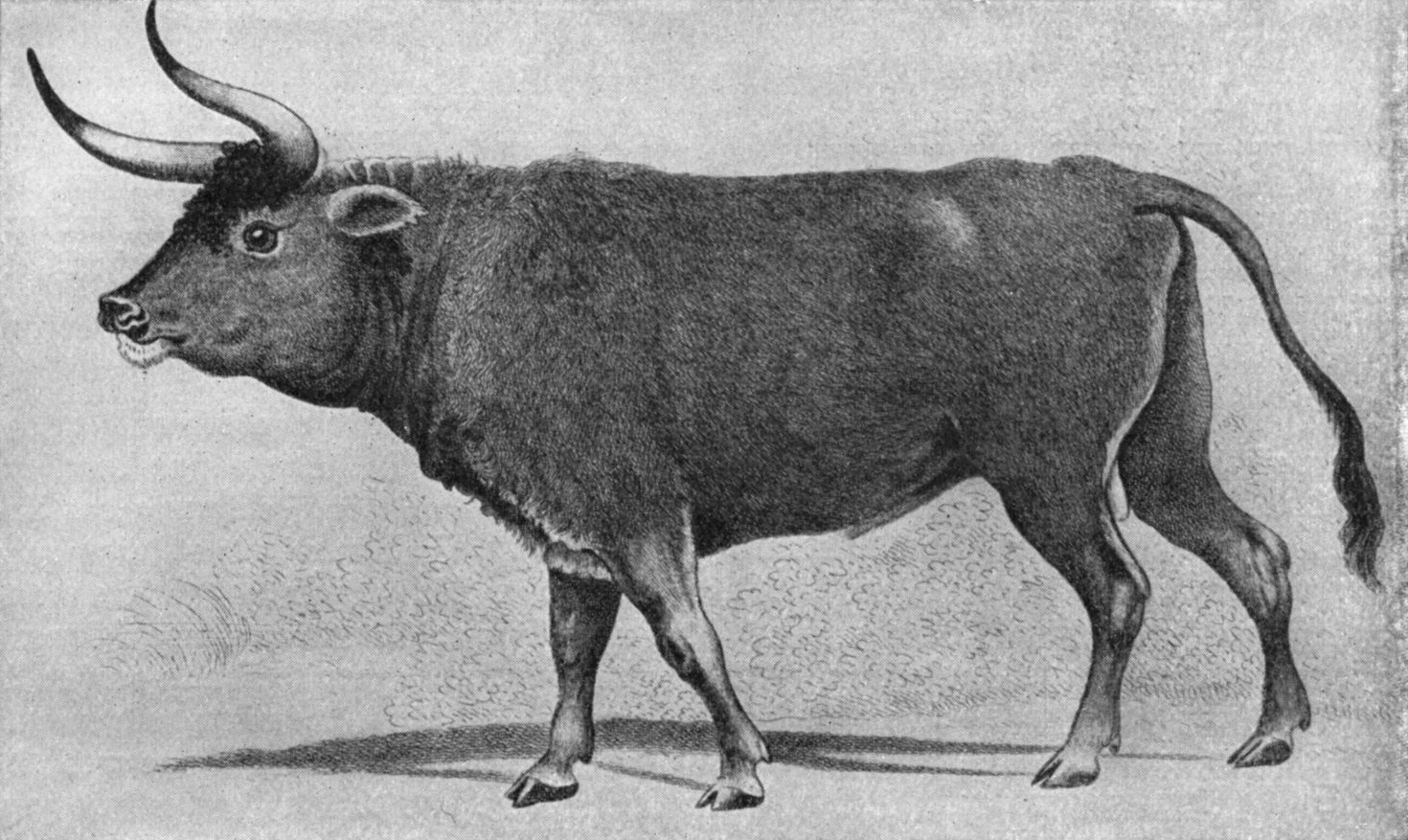
Numerous remains of aurochs were excavated in all cave strata

Made of light-brown compact sediment. Artifacts from the Upper Paleolithic were discovered: bladelets, unretouched blades, straight backed points and combined tools. They were characteristic for the Gravettian and early Epi-Gravettian periods. The layer is disturbed by the rodent activities. Later, the inhabitants leveled and dug the terrain. As a result, some Middle Paleolithic artifacts can be found but they do not originate in this layer. Fauna remains are very fragmented. Most abundant remains of the carnivorous animals belong to the grey wolf while the prey animals include aurochs, horse and Alpine ibex. Remains were also found of the hares, cave hyena, Mustelidae and red deer. Over 100 artifacts were found. They were mostly made of chalcedony and the beige and brown flint stone and their structure point to the short term habitation.

=== Layer 3 ===
It consists of brown sediment. Artifacts generally belong to the Denticulate Mousterian culture, from the Middle Paleolithic period. It is quite disturbed in the later periods, with rodent holes. Fauna remains are numerous, mostly corresponding to the one discovered in Layer 4. Most plentiful are those of horses and aurochs while the main predators found are the cave hyena. Other remains include hares, red fox, cave bear, Eurasian lynx, Mustelidae, roe deer and Alpine ibex. The structure of artifacts found in the layer for the most part also corresponds to Layer 4. Apart from chalcedony and the beige and brown flint, the grey-green flint is also used but the most common are tools made of quartz.

=== Layer 4 ===
Reddish and loose in structure, the layer consists of larger crumbs. In the back section large fragments of rock were discovered and the sediment is dark brown. Because of that, the layer is divided into Layer 4-a (reddish) and Layer 4-b (dark brown), which hasn't been fully explored yet. The assemblage is dated to the Middle Paleolithic and as part of the Charentian Mousterian period, with Quina Mousterian elements. There are many fauna remnants and they are well preserved. Predominant are the bones of horse and aurochs with red deer and Alpine ibex to the lesser extent. Bones of rhinoceros and woolly mammoth have also been found. Remains of the cave hyena, fragmentation of the bones, marks of the hyena teeth on the bones and huge amount of coprolites, points to hyenas being on top of the food chain in this period. Other animal remnants include Eurasian beaver, hare, cave bear, leopard, Mustelidae and chamois. Over 100 artifacts were discovered, which mostly made of quartz, while the flint and chalcedony were also found. Though artifacts from all three phases of the flint-knapping were discovered (blades, tools, pressure flaking), the cores were not discovered which means that the tools were most likely made somewhere else and then brought into the cave.

Mammals belonged to the different biomes (forest, mountain, steppe), with the steppe animals being more numerous in the upper layers. It suggests that savanna (with the grazing horse and aurochs herds); temperate forest (red deer, roe deer) and rocky cliffs (Alpine ibex, chamois) were all located within walking distance from the cave. Though majority of the remains were brought into the cave by hyenas, remains of large animals like rhinoceros and mammoths, so as the artifacts, show that some remains were human kills.

A major roof collapse near the entrance, or the possible bedrock which separated two caves, is later labeled the Layer 4-c. It still remains unexplored.

=== Hominin fossil material ===
Neanderthals were thriving during the last Interglacial period, 130,000-70,000 BP, and in this period, they lived all over the Balkans. In the wider Pešturina region, evidence of the Neanderthal presence was discovered in the localities of Meča Dupka, Golema Dupka, and Kremenac, all in the Niš and Leskovac depressions, and on the slopes of the Radan mountain.

All Paleolithic sites in the Central Balkans, including Pešturina, have the noticeable absence of the Aurignacian layers. That points to the theory that the expansion of the early modern humans into Europe occurred via the Danube corridor, which allowed for the small Neanderthal communities to survive beyond 40,000 BP in some isolated pockets. Based on the dating of the animal remains, and comparing it to the corresponding tools, Pešturina is the first site in the region with the quasi-continuous habitation from 102,000 BP+ 5,000 to 39,000 BP+ 3,000.

In April 2019 the discovery of the Neanderthal remains was announced by the Serbian-Canadian team and published in the Journal of Human Evolution. It was an exceptionally preserved permanent right molar (named Pes-3), found among numerous Mousterian artifacts and animal remains, typical for the Pleistocene fauna (horse, European bison, mammoth, rhinoceros), including a bone with parallel carvings. The remarkable preservation and minimal wear of the tooth enabled a detailed examination which confirmed the Neanderthal morphology. It belonged to a person in late childhood.

The specimen was recovered from strati-graphic Layer 4-b, the oldest examined layer. The finding confirmed the presence of Neanderthals in the territory of Serbia and the Central Balkans at the end of Marine Isotope Stage 5-C. Estimated age of the specimen is 102,400 BP+ 3,200, or the beginning of the last Ice Age, when the climate in the area was still relatively mild. In 2022, remains were re-dated to 111,000 BP. The tooth had calculus preserved on it. Bacterial DNA, part of person's oral microbiome, was preserved and extracted. Remains of the bacteria discovered showed that both meat and plants were used in Neanderthal diet.

Further two hominin remains were discovered and assessed by 2020. One is a fragment of radial diaphysis (Pes-2), discovered between the layers 3 and 4, and tentatively assigned to Neanderthals, based on morphology. Second is a partial atlas vertebra (C1), discovered i the lower portion of Layer 2, exhibiting modern human morphology. The atlas is probably originating from a Pleistocene and is associated with the Gravettian assemblage of Layer 2. There is no evidence of Holocene intrusion. That way, Pešturina became the only site in the Central Balkans with both modern human and Neanderthal remains preserved, highlighting the importance of the cave regarding hominid dispersal and migrations.

== See also ==
- Balanica cave complex
