= Ostrovica, Niška Banja =

Ostrovica Островица
- Village
- Location within Serbia
- Country: Serbia
- Region: Southern and Eastern Serbia
- District: Nišava
- Municipality: Niška Banja
- Time zone: UTC+1 (CET)
  - Summer (DST): UTC+2 (CEST)

Ostrovica (Serbian: Островица) is a village in Serbia located southeast of Niš, on the railroad toward Dimitrovgrad, in the municipality of Niška Banja. According to the 2002 census, the village had 603 inhabitants.

== See also ==
- List of settlements in Serbia
