= Sićevo Gorge =

Archaeological site in Serbia

- Сићевачка клисура (Serbian)
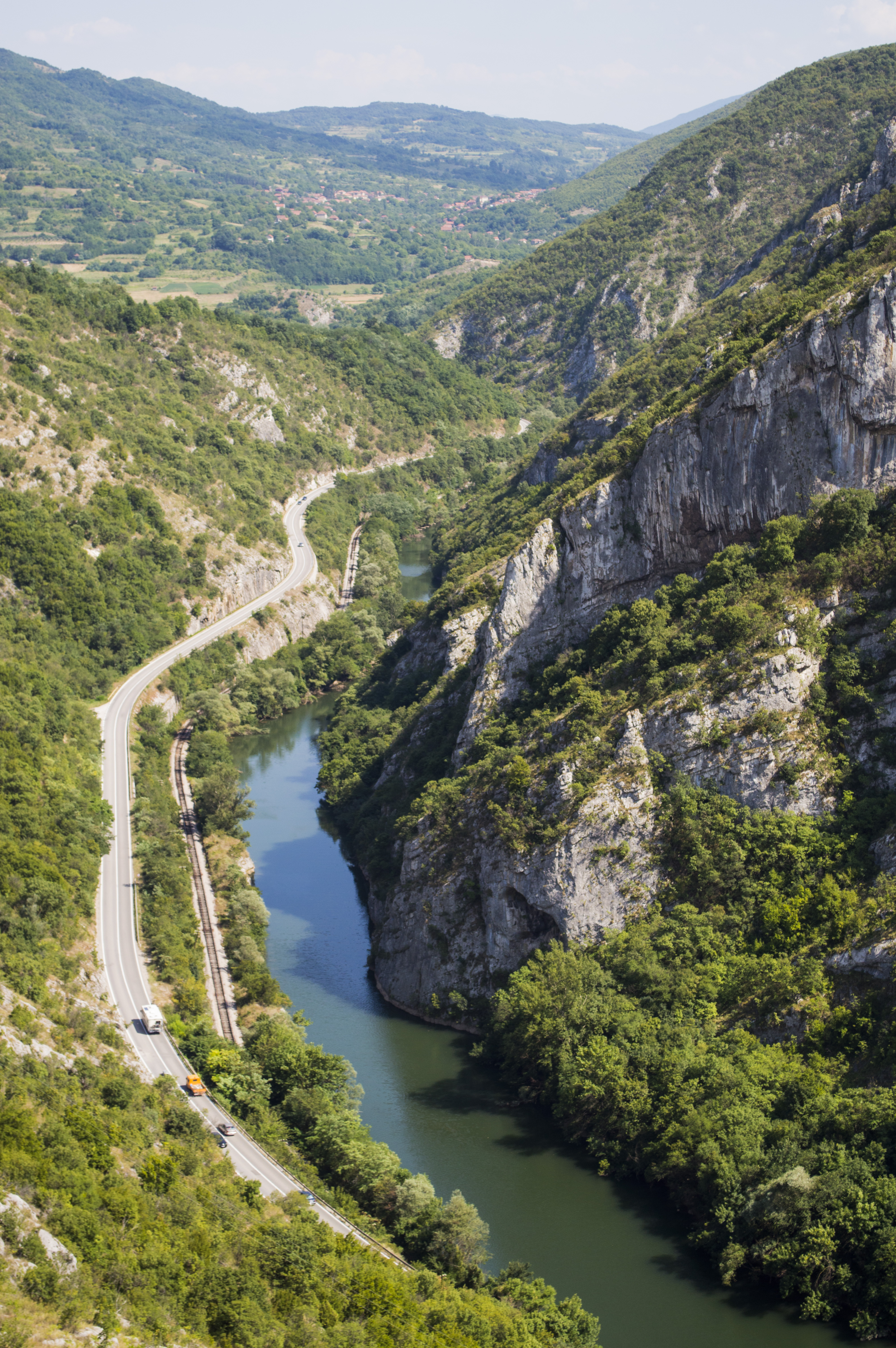
- Sićevo Gorge

- location in Serbia
- 43°18′51″N 22°8′10″E
- Location: between Bela Palanka and Niška Banja
- Region: southeastern Serbia

Site notes
- Length: 17 km (11 mi)

The Sićevo Gorge (Serbian: Sićevačka klisura; Serbian Cyrillic: Сићевачка клисура, pronounced [sîtɕɛʋatʃkaː klǐsura]), a river gorge and archaeological site in southeastern Serbia, is the locally most prominent geological and topographic feature formed by the Nišava River. The gorge is located between the towns of Bela Palanka and Niška Banja. It is 17 km (11 mi) long and 350 to 400 m (1,150 to 1,310 ft) deep, in some parts developing canyon-like structures (including the inverse valley slopes at the Gradiški kanjon). The gorge is cut into the Kunovica plateau, between the southern slopes of the Svrljig Mountains and the mountain of Suva Planina. The surrounding areas are known for their high-quality vineyards. The gorge contains a stone quarry, the Ostrovica and six villages. The largest, Sićevo is the eponym of the gorge.

== Art in the Sićevo Gorge ==
The Sićevo Gorge is also notable for its cultural heritage: it hosts the oldest art colony in Serbia, established in 1904 by the painter Nadežda Petrović, and the Sićevo Literary Colony, founded in 1991 by the Society of Writers and Literary Translators of Niš.

== Archaeological findings ==
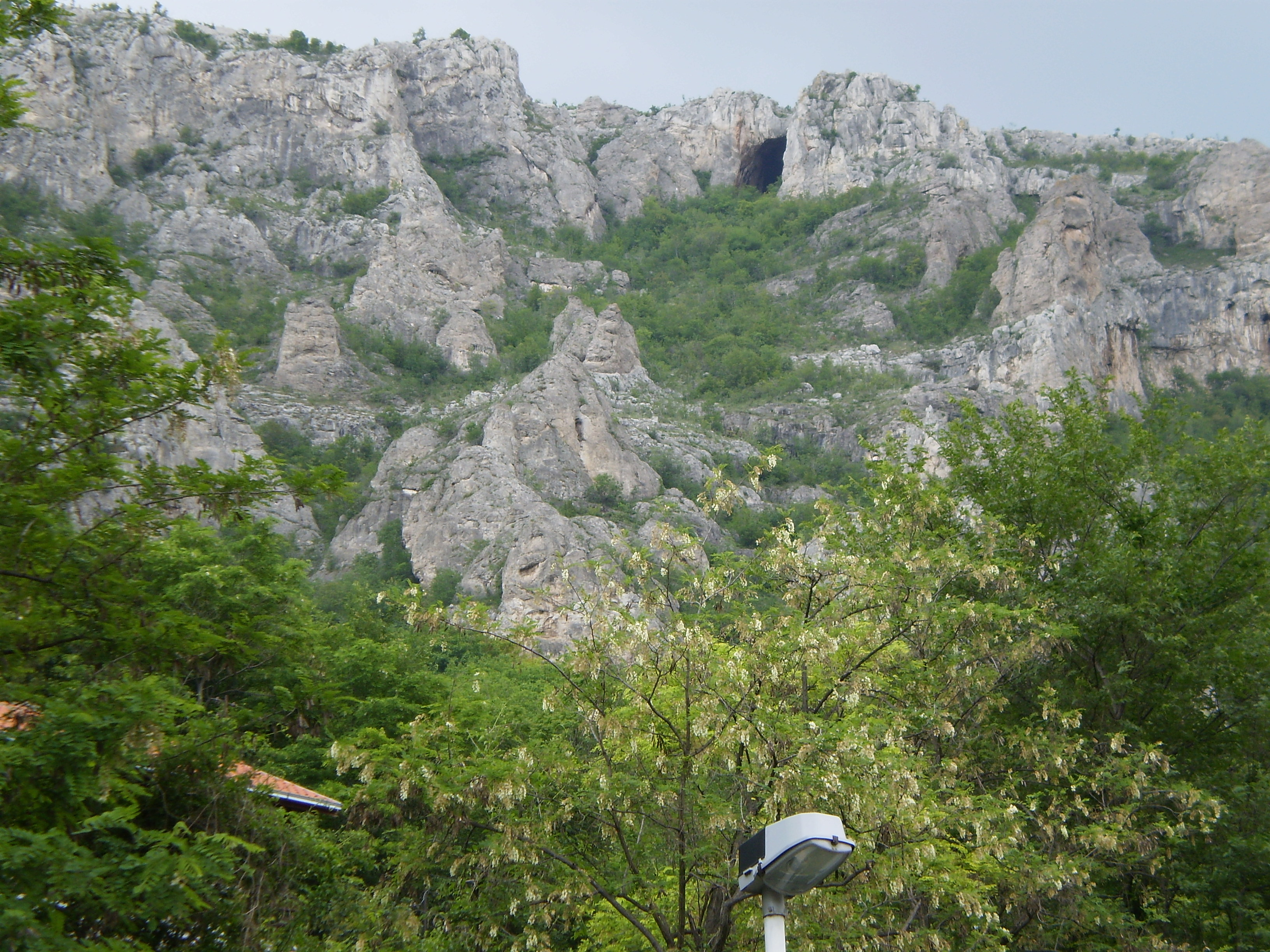
Caves in the surrounding area Sićevo

In June 2008, a lower jaw fragment was excavated in the Mala Balanica cave, one of several cave sites in the gorge. This hominin jaw bone fossil was dated to be between 397,000 and 525,000 years old on the basis of electron spin resonance in combination with uranium series isotopic analysis and infrared/post-infrared luminescence dating. The morphology of the mandible differs significantly from the more recent Homo heidelbergensis and completely lacks any prominent Homo neanderthalensis features. The jaw represents one of an increasing number of specimen discoveries in the south-eastern part of the European continent. It demonstrates plesiomorphic erectus-like traits that are coupled with synapomorphic traits common to Chibanian hominins. It was recently suggested that the fossil specimen could belong to the newly described species Homo bodoensis.
