= Suva Planina =

Mountain in Serbia

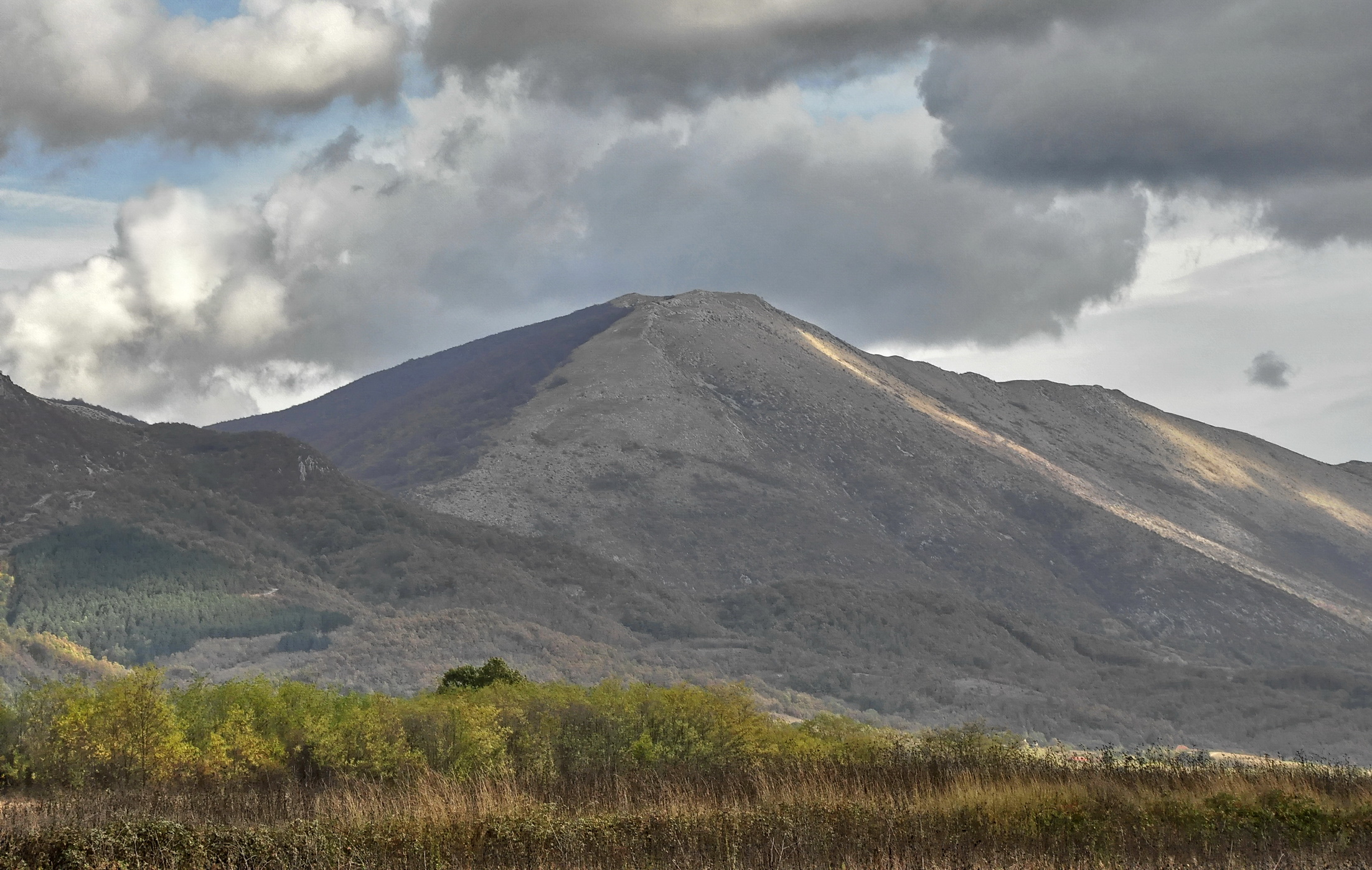

Highest point
- Peak: Trem
- Elevation: 1,810 m (5,940 ft)
- Prominence: 1,209 m (3,967 ft)
- Listing: Ribu
- Coordinates: 43°10′49″N 22°10′34″E

Geography
- Location within Serbia
- Country: Serbia

Suva Planina (Serbian Cyrillic: Сува планина, lit. "Dry Mountain") is a mountain in southern Serbia. It lies between the towns of Niška Banja to the northwest and Babušnica to the southeast, with a ridge branching towards Bela Palanka to the north. It was previously called Kunovica.

Pešturina Cave on the mountain is the location of the first discovery of Neanderthal remains in Serbia, recorded in 2019.

== Geography ==
The mountain stretches in the northwest-southeast direction. It divides two valleys, Sićevo (on the northeast) and Zaplanje (on the west). Its ridge is 45 kilometres (28 mi) long, and up to 15 kilometres (9.3 mi) wide. Its northern slope starts 13 kilometres (8.1 mi) south of Niška Banja, while in the south it ends in the Lužnica basin. Geographer Jovan Cvijić upon surveying the mountain, called it the Alps of Serbian South.

The massif has remarkable forms and phenomena karst relief, and the mountain is a treasury of sediments of different ages rich in fossil flora and fauna. The relief allows that even during the harsh winters, when winds form snowdrifts, some pastures remain uncovered by the snow. The highest peak is Trem ("porch") at 1,810 metres (5,940 ft), the second highest being Golemo Stražište at 1,714 metres (5,623 ft), as well as Litica ("cliff") at 1,683 metres (5,522 ft) on the southeast side of the mountain.

The name stems from the fact that there are only a few springs in the whole mountain. The two biggest are Bojanine Vode (near to Sokolov Kamen at 860 metres (2,820 ft)), and Rakoš Česma (on the Bela Palanka side of the mountain). At the Rakoš spring, there is a small lake, which serves as the watering hole for the mountain's feral horses.

== Wildlife ==
The mountain is known for its vegetation diversity. By 2015, 1,261 various plant species have been recorded on Suva Planina, or one third of flora represented on territory of Serbia. Large number of plans is endemic or relict. Endemic species include Serbian rose (Rosa serbica) and Pančić's columbine (Aquilegia pancicii). Deciduous forests are made of oak and beech, while the coniferous forest belt ends with the zone of mugo pine. Within the forested zones, there are numerous communities of meadows, pastures, rocks, screes and rocky glades.

Diverse fauna inhabits numerous ecosystems. Animal species include 259 species of insects (80 species of prime butterflies), 14 species of amphibians and reptiles, 13 species of fish, 139 species of birds, and 25 species of mammals. Some of the animals on the mountain include northern crested newt, Hermann's tortoise, horned viper, golden eagle, European snow vole, wolf, roe deer, wild boar, etc.

The Divna Gorica Range is known for feral horses. They also roam to the other, higher parts of the mountain, above 1,600 m (5,200 ft). For centuries, the horses were kept by the local population in stables during the winter, while with the spring, they would let the horses to roam the mountain. As number of population plummeted, horses were left outside the entire year, occasionally cared for by the some remaining denizens.

== Protection ==
The mountain is considered an exquisite nature reserve, and oasis of, in some parts, pristine and undisturbed nature. Since 2010, Suva Planina went a process of declaration of as a special nature preserve. Special Nature Reserve Suva Planina was declared in 2015. Protected area covers 181 square kilometres (70 sq mi). Highest level of protection is reserved for the areas unaffected, or slightly altered by human dwelling: it extends from the Mosor peak, further across the peaks Sokolov Kamen, Trem, Točila and Smrdan, to Ržanca and Divna Gorica. It includes cliffs below these peaks on the north side of the mountain. Second degree regime includes the areas of Valožje, the peak Golemo Stražište, and the isolated area of Rubovac-Cerje (or Rebrine). Lowest protection covers the remaining 93,5% of the reserve.

== History ==
The Pešturina cave, nicknamed the "Serbian Atapuerca", is located on the northern slopes of the mountain. Since 2006 the cave has been archaeologically surveyed and artifacts from the Middle and Upper Paleolithic periods have been discovered. The artifacts belong to the Neanderthal Mousterian culture, and are dated from 102,000 BP+ 5,000 to 39,000 BP + 3,000, making Pešturina one of the longest surviving Neanderthal habitations. In April 2019 it was announced that Neanderthal remains were discovered, which marks the first discovery of such in Serbia.

Traces of the Roman military road Via Militaris, connecting Singidunum (now Belgrade) and Constantinople (now Istanbul) are still visible from the mountain.

The traditional way of cattle breeding developed in time, so as a fruit growing and wine producing. There are also numerous characteristic ethno-architecture objects from the end of the 19th century, which represent a valuable, and recognizable, cultural heritage of the area. The stone for building houses was also dug on the mountain. By the 2020s, however, most of the economic activity stopped due to the massive depopulation, with the limepit in the village of Mali Krčimir being one of the exceptions.

The mountain remains known for the extensive husbandry, where hundreds of cattle and horses are left to freely roam over the mountain during the warm season, up to the early November. In the season of 2021 there were over 800 cattle and 200 horses on the mountain, when the only water spring on the mountain, Rakoš, completely dried out in August due to the hot summer and prolonged drought. There have been dry seasons before, so the local administration already hired military to bring water to the animals, but the contract expired and military withdrew. Herdsmen also hired private contractors to bring water, but were left without funds, plus they could provide small amount of water needed - daily needs are 50 tons, and only 6 tons could be provided. By September the situation turned dire, as there was no point to herd livestock back into the villages, as all water sources dried out there, too, and the tap water was heavily restricted.

Out of six major droughts recorded since 1990, this one was the most severe, as the mountain is getting drier. Local authorities called the situation a catastrophe, and the nationwide action was taken to help the animals with situation on the mountain becoming a national news. Activists and donors organized, but couldn't provide nearly enough water. In the end, the Ministry of agriculture stepped in, promising to pay for the water transport, and the army resumed the water transport.

However, since the 1970s, the population is dwindling, and once large herds of cattle, and especially sheep, are no more. Some family members from the households would spend entire warm season on the mountain with animals, producing cheese and wool. By the 2020s, husbandry and agriculture were exercised only for the meeds of local households.

== Tourism ==
The slopes of this mountain are popular with skiing. Every final weekend in February there is a mountaineering event, Zimski uspon na Trem ("Winter climb on Trem"), which gathers over 600 mountaineers from all parts of the Balkans. It is also the regions's biggest mountain winter event. It started in 1997 and is currently under the organization of mountaineering club Železničar, based in Niš.

== Gallery ==
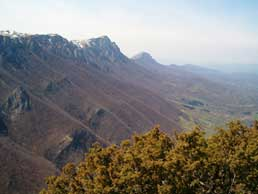

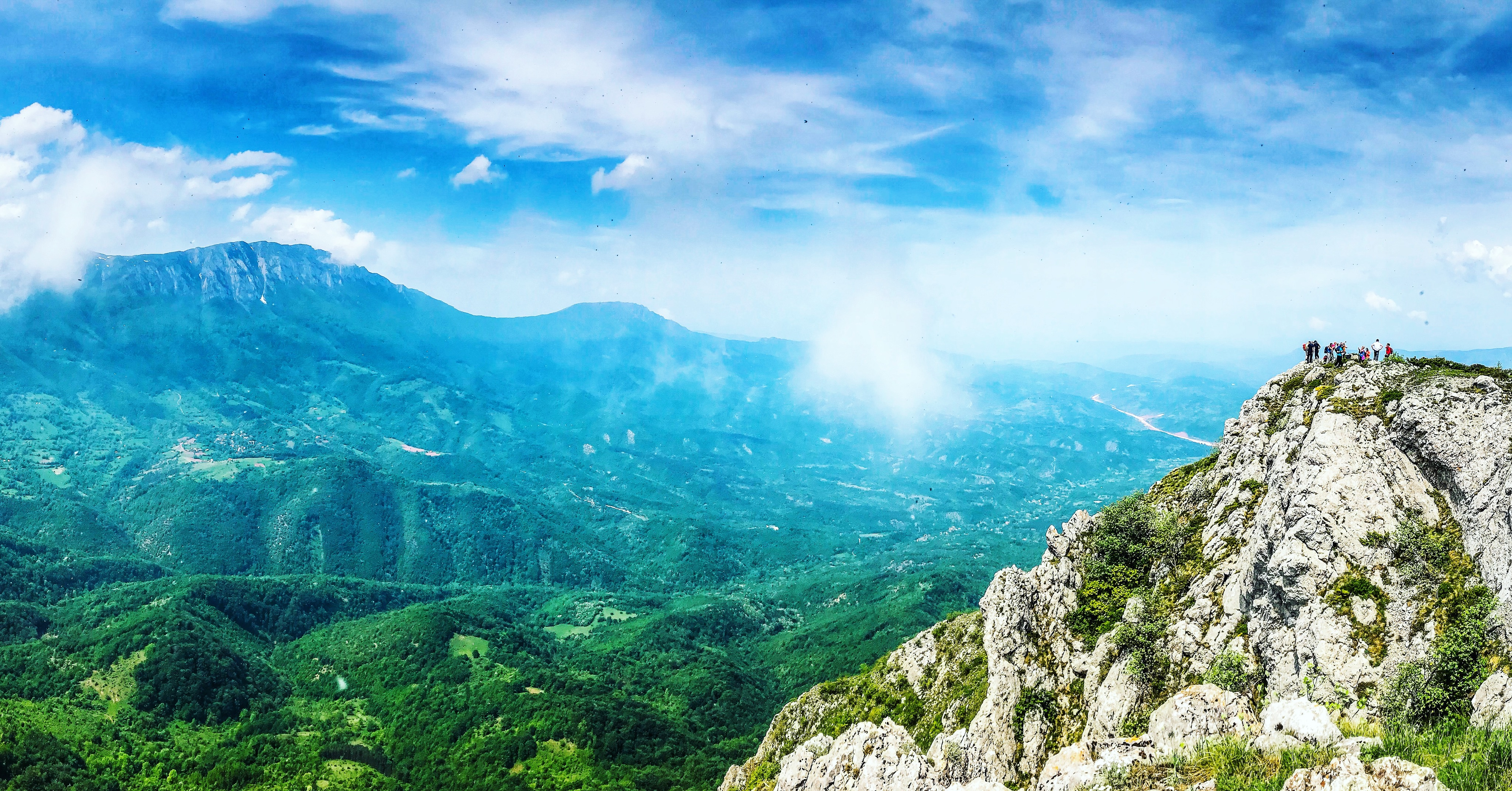

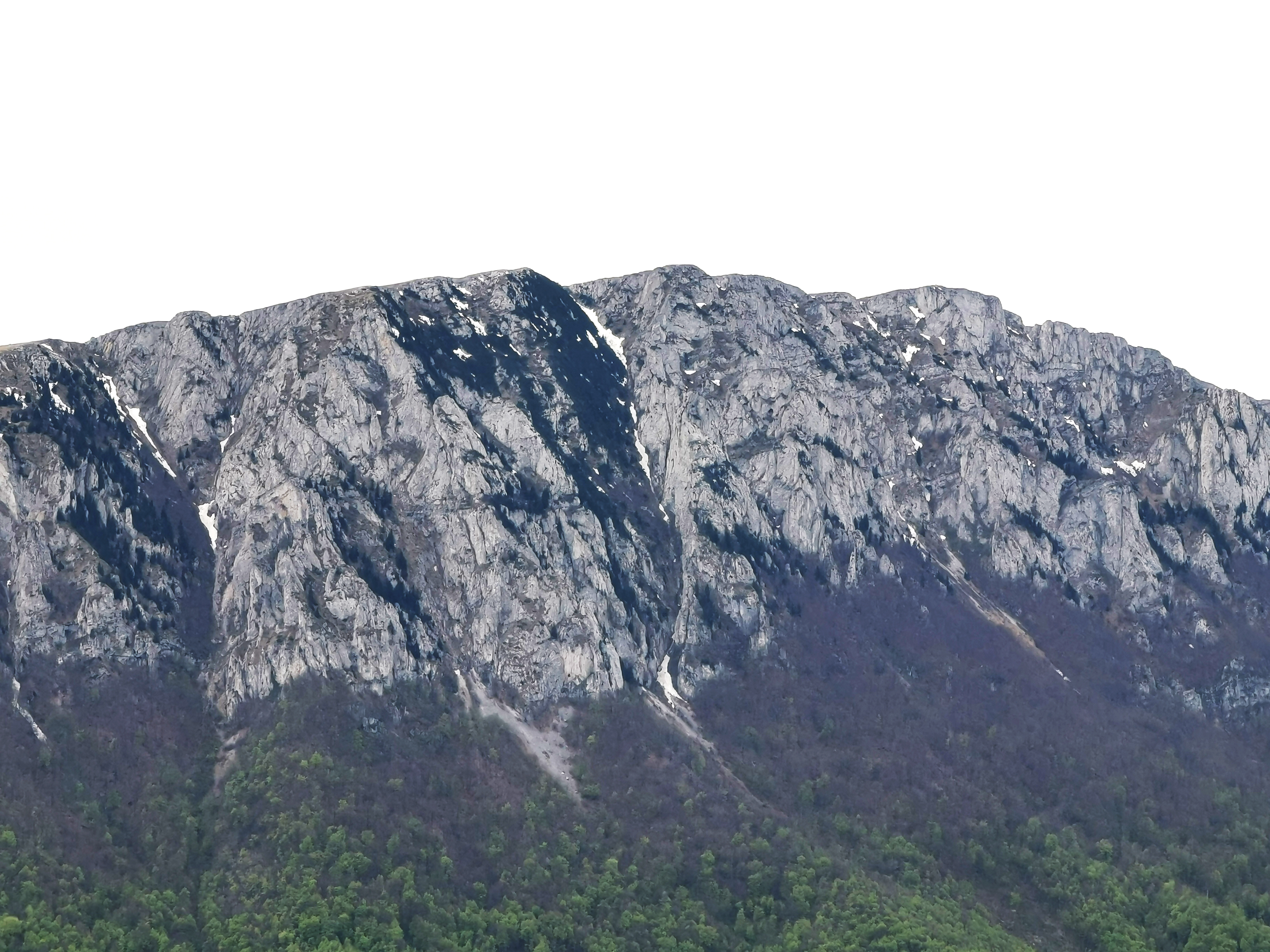

== See also ==
- List of mountains in Serbia
