= Sićevo =

Sićevo Сићево
- Village
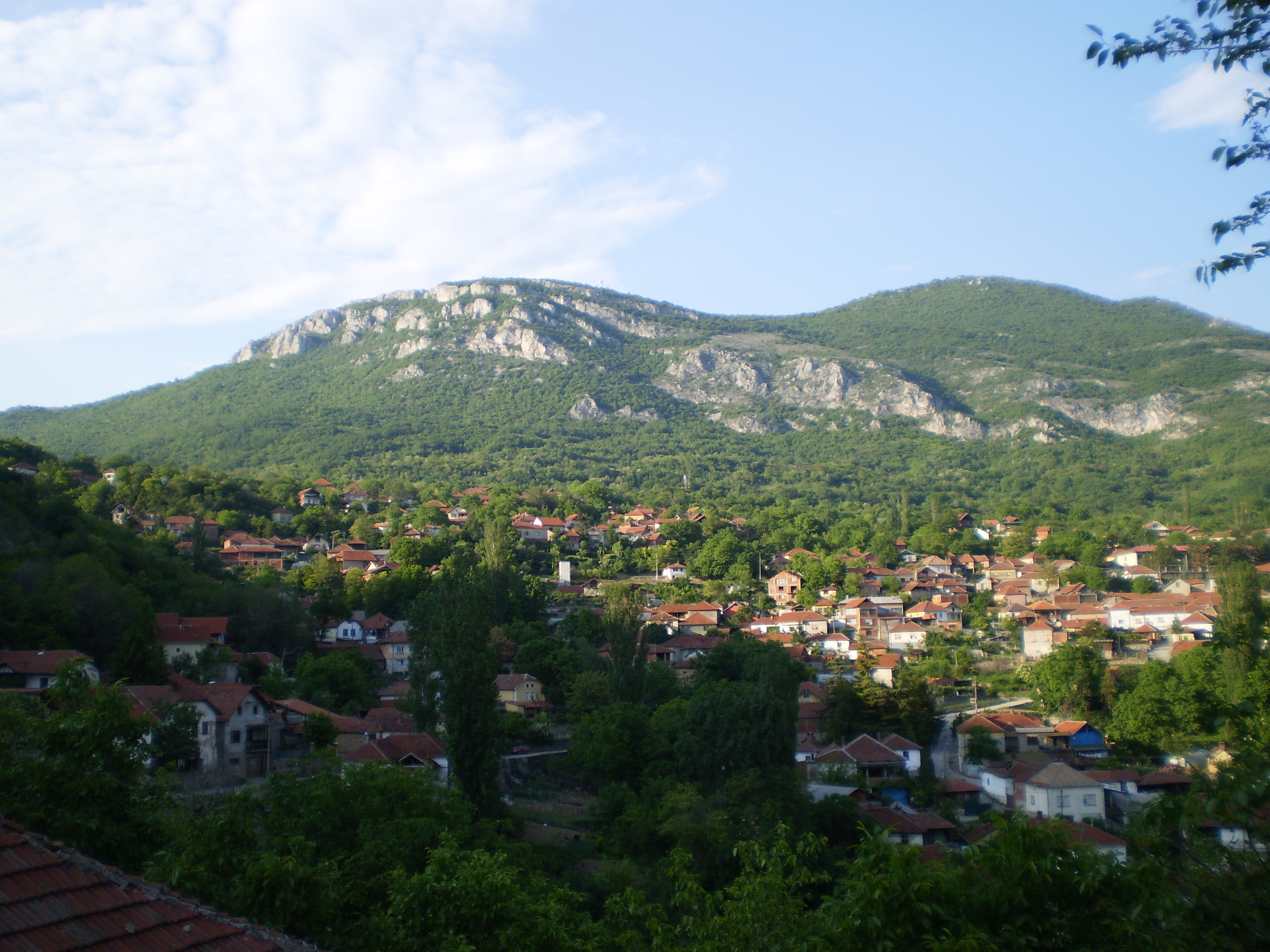

- Location within Serbia
- Coordinates: 43°20′17″N 22°05′01″E
- Country: Serbia
- District: Nišava District
- City: Niš
- Municipality: Niška Banja

Population (2011)
  - Total: 772
- Time zone: UTC+1 (CET)
  - Summer (DST): UTC+2 (CEST)

Sićevo (Serbian Cyrillic: Сићево) is a village in the administrative area of the city of Niš in southern Serbia. According to the 2011 census, the village has a population of 772 people. It lies on a hilltop above the entrance of the Sićevo Gorge of the Nišava River. It is located in Nišava district.
