= Signal, International Review of Signalist Research =

Avant-garde magazine

Signal
- Editor: Miroljub Todorović
- Publisher: Signalism, international avant-garde movement
- Founder: Miroljub Todorović
- First issue: September 1, 1970
- Final issue Number: 2004; 30
- Country: Yugoslavia / Serbia
- Based in: Belgrade
- Language: multilingual (Serbian, English, Hungarian etc)

Magazine Signal with the subtitle "International Review of Signalist Research" was the periodical of Signalism, international avant-garde creative movement. The magazine was founded in 1970 in Belgrade. Founder and editor-in-chief was Miroljub Todorović.

The movement was significantly boosted by the magazine, publishing multilingual works of neo avant-garde poets, fiction writers, essayists and visual artists from Europe, North and South America, Japan and Australia.

Nine issues of Signal appeared between 1970 and 1973, presenting a number of domestic and international artists, as well as printing bibliographical data about the avant-garde publications all around the world. From 1973 until 1995 magazine could not be published, mainly for financial reasons.

From 1995 to 2004 another 21 issues of Signal appeared. The new release of Signal revitalized the Signalist movement and brought numerous young artists into the movement in 21st century.

== Notable international contributors ==
- Marina Abramovic, sound artist, performance artist.
- Raoul Hausmann, dadaist, the founder of Berlin Dada in 1918.
- Augusto de Campos, one of the initiators of the concrete poetry.
- Michele Perfetti, mail-artist, critic and theoretician of neo-avant-garde.
- Adriano Spatola, Italian poet, editor of the experimental poetry magazine "Tam Tam".
- Clemente Padin, visual poet and theoretician, editor of the neo-avant-garde magazine "Ovum 10" in Uruguay
- Julien Blaine, visual poet, performer, mail and conceptual artist. The editor of the eminent neo-avant-garde magazines "Doc(k)s"
- Sarenco, visual poet, performer, anthologist, founder and editor of the Italian neo-avant-garde magazine "Lotta Poetica"
- Eugenio Miccini, one of the most prominent Italian visual poets and theoretician of neo-avant-garde
- Richard Kostelanetz, visual poet, theoretician of neo-avant-garde, anthologist, editor of the "Assembling"
- Guillermo Deisler, Chilean visual poet, critic and anthologist
- Bob Cobbing, English concrete poet and theoretician of sound poetry
- Eugen Gomringer, concrete poet and theoretician, one of the founders of concrete poetry
- Pierre Garnier, concrete poet and theoretician, founder of French spatialism, the spatial poetry
- Enzo Minarelli, main representative of the Italian "poesia visiva"—the visible poetry
- Keiichi Nakamura, Japanese visual and mail-artist.
- Dick Higgins, visual poet and theoretician of neo-avant-garde, editor of the publishing company "Something Else Press"
- Dmitry Bulatov, Russian visual poet, theoretician and anthologist
- Sol LeWitt, prominent American conceptualist
- Shozo Shimamoto, a member of the famous Japanese neo-avant-garde group "Gutai"
- Dr. Klaus Peter Dencker, visual poet and theoretician who put together one of the cult anthologies of visual poetry "Text-Bilder"
- Ruggero Maggi, Italian visual poet, painter and mail-artist
- Daniel Daligand, French visual poet, mail-artist and critic
- Willi R. Melnikov, Russian visual poet, mail-artist and performer
- Kum-Nam Baik, South Korean mail-artist
- On Kawara, American conceptual artist
- Klaus Groh, neo-dadaist, the founder of the neo-dadaist center in Germany and author of numerous anthologies and collections of visual poetry, mail-art and conceptual art.

== Literature ==
- Todorović Miroljub, „Povodom prvog broja Internacionalne revije Signal“, in: Planetarna kultura, Belgrade, 1995, pp. 69–71.
- Živković Živan, „Časopis Signal“, in: Signalizam – geneza, poetika i umetnička praksa, Paraćin, 1994, pp. 25–30.
- Pavlović Milivoje, „Novi sjaj Signala“, Politika, 4. oktobar 1997, str. 28.
- P. M. „Priznanje srpskom Signalu“ (Beogradski internacionalni časopis dobio nagradu na međunarodnoj književnoj smotri kao najbolja revija u 1998. za intermedijalna književno-umetnička istraživanja), Politika, 18. 3. 1999, p. 15.
- Tišma Andrej, „Ratni dvobroj Signala“, Dnevnik, Novi Sad, 7. 7. 1999, pp. 13
