= Society of Writers and Literary Translators of Niš =

Serbian cultural organization

- Друштво књижевника и књижевних преводилаца Ниша; Društvo književnika i književnih prevodilaca Niša
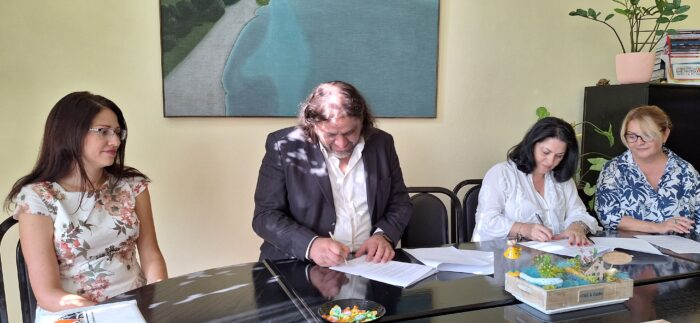
- Founded: 1952; 74 years ago
- Headquarters: Šumatovačka 4 Street; Niš
- Location: Serbia
- Key people: Dalibor Popović Pop (president)
- Website: drustvoknjizevnika.com

The Society of Writers and Literary Translators of Niš (Serbian: Друштво књижевника и књижевних преводилаца Ниша, romanized: Društvo književnika i književnih prevodilaca Niša), founded in 1952, is a professional cultural organization based in Niš, Serbia.

== Activities ==
The society cooperates with the City of Niš in awarding the annual literary prize Slaviša Nikolin Živković. It also participates in the organization of the international Literary colony Sićevo, a creative event that supports contemporary writers and promotes new literary voices.

== Notable members ==
- Branko Miljković (1934–1961) – Serbian poet from Niš.
- Velimir Živojinović Massuka (1886–1974) – Serbian poet, playwright, and translator; served as an early leader in the organization.
- Miroljub Todorović – Serbian poet, artist, and founder of the Signalism avant-garde movement.
- Branimir Živojinović (1925–2012) – Serbian poet and translator, son of Velimir Živojinović Massuka.
- Irina Antanasijević – Russian and Serbian philologist, literary critic, and translator.
- Ana Ilić – Serbian poet and philosophy student from Vladičin Han.
- Radosav Stojanović – Serbian writer, journalist, and lexicographer.
- Dimitar Anakiev – Independent filmmaker, writer, and poet.
