= Miroljub Todorović =

Serbian poet and artist

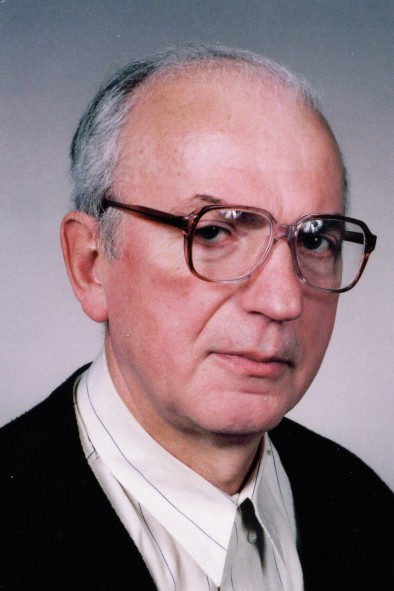
- Born: 5 March 1940 (age 86); Skoplje, Kingdom of Yugoslavia
- Education: University of Belgrade
- Occupations: Writer poet theoretician editor
- Spouse: Dinka Todorović
- Writing career
- Language: Serbian
- Genres: Experimental novel, Short story, poetry, essays
- Literary movement: Signalism
- Website: miroljubtodorovic.com

Miroljub Todorović (Serbian Cyrillic: Мирољуб Тодоровић; born 5 March 1940) is a Serbian poet and artist. He is the founder and theoretician of Signalism, an international avant-garde literary and artistic movement. He is also editor-in-chief of the International review "Signal".

== Biography ==
He was born March 5, 1940, in Skoplje. The war years he spent as a refugee with his mother (a teacher), and his sister in the areas around the Great Morava river, where he finished elementary school. In 1954 the whole family moved to Niš, where he finished high school.

He graduated from the University of Belgrade Faculty of Law in 1963. For a time he studied Public International Law at the third instance of the same faculty. A member of the editorial board of the student culture periodical “Vidici”, he participated in the student uprising of 1968. His poem "March of the Red University" was multiplied in thousands of copies and adopted by acclamation at the Student Union at the Faculty of Philosophy as the anthem of the University of Belgrade.

In 1969 he founded the neo-avantgarde literary and artistic movement Signalism, and the following year he launched the International Review “Signal” publishing most important avant-garde authors Raoul Hausmann, Augusto de Campos, Michele Perfetti, Adriano Spatola, Clemente Padin, Julien Blaine, Sarenco, Eugenio Miccini, Richard Kostelanetz, Guillermo Deisler, Bob Cobbing, Eugen Gomringer, Pierre Garnier, Enzo Minarelli, Keiichi Nakamura, Dick Higgins, Dmitry Bulatov, Sol LeWitt, Shozo Shimamoto, Klaus Peter Dencker, Ruggero Maggi, Daniel Daligand, Willi R. Melnikov, Kum-Nam Baik, On Kawara, Klaus Groh etc.

He worked as a journalist, a high school teacher, secretary of the editorial board, editor and advisor for Interstate and International Cultural Cooperation of the Ministry of Culture of the Republic of Serbia. In 1982 he retired and fully devoted himself to literary and artistic work.

Poetry, essays, and intermedia works of Miroljub Todorović have been published in several languages: in anthologies, collections, catalogs, newspapers and magazines in Europe, North and South America, Australia, South Korea and Japan.

As an artist, he had a dozen solo exhibitions and participated in more than six hundred collective international exhibitions of drawings, collages, visual poetry, mail-art and conceptual art.

He is included in the biographical dictionary “Serbs Who Have Marked the Twentieth Century” (five hundred persons), Belgrade 2006.

On the work of Miroljub Todorović and Signalism movement that he had founded, three doctoral dissertations have been defended: Dr. Julian Kornhauser, Jagiellonian University in Kraków, Poland, 1980; Dr. Živan Živković, Faculty of Philology in Belgrade, 1991 and Dr. Milivoje Pavlović, University of Kosovska Mitrovica, 2002. Twenty monographs have also been published on the same subject.

In the holdings of the Library of the Serbian Academy of Arts and Sciences there is a "Special Miroljub Todorović library", and in the Historical Archives of Belgrade there is a Legacy “Miroljub Todorović”.

He is a member of the Society of Writers and Literary Translators of Niš.

== Awards and recognitions ==
- 1995: "Pavle Marković Adamov" for poetry and life work
- 1998: "Oskar Davičo" for best book published in (Star's Trowel)
- 1999: "Todor Manojlović" for modern artist's sensibility
- 2005: "Vuk Award" for exceptional contribution in Serbian cultural space
- 2007: “Vuk Legacy“ Award for art, for poetry book “Blue Wind”,
- 2008: “Golden Letter“ Award for book ‘Slang Stories“
- 2010: “Krleža Award” for life work
- 2010: Diploma for life work of Writers Association of Serbia,
- 2011: “Golden link” by Cultural-educational community of Belgrade, for perpetual contribution to the capital's culture

== Works ==
=== Poetry books ===
- Planet (Planeta / Планета, 1965)
- Signal (1970)
- Kyberno (1970)
- Trip to Astroland (Putovanje u Zvezdaliju / Путовање у Звездалију, 1971)
- The Pig is an Excellent Swimmer (Svinja je odličan plivač / Свиња је одличан пливач, 1971)
- Staircase (Stepenište / Степениште, 1971)
- Gift-parcel (Poklon-paket / Поклон-пакет, 1972)
- Certainly Milk Flame Bee (Naravno mleko plamen pčela / Наравно млеко пламен пчела, 1972)
- Thirty Signalist Poems (English 1973)
- Bumpkin Shows off (Gejak glanca guljarke / Гејак гланца гуљарке, 1974), slang poetry
- TV Set to Stare at, (Telezur za trakanje / Телезур за тракање, 1977), slang poetry
- Insect on the Temple (Insekt na slepoočnici / Инсект на слепоочници, 1978)
- Algol (1980)
- Textum (Tekstum / Текстум, 1981)
- Brain Soup (Čorba od mozga / Чорба од мозга, 1982)
- Chinese Erotism (1983)
- Knock-out (Nokaut / Нокаут, 1984)
- A Day on the Hymen (Dan na devičnjaku / Дан на девичњаку, 1985)
- I Become Silent Horror Language Core (Zaćutim jeza jezik jezgro / Заћутим језа језик језгро, 1986)
- I Mount Rosinante Again (Ponovo uzjahujem Rosinanta / Поново узјахујем Росинанта, 1987), selected poems
- Water-snake Drinks Rainwater (Belouška popije kišnicu / Белоушка попије кишницу, 1988)
- Soupe de cervau dans l'Europe de l'Est (1988)
- St. Vitus Day (Vidov dan / Видов дан, 1989)
- Rzav River Neighs Happily (Radosno rže Rzav / Радосно рже Рзав, 1990)
- His Thorn Red and Black (Trn mu crven i crn / Трн му црвен и црн, 1991)
- Ambassador Dustbin (Ambasadorska kibla / Амбасадорска кибла, 1991), slang poetry
- Grill from Srem (Sremski ćevap / Сремски ћевап, 1991)
- I Breathe, I Talk (Dišem. Govorim / Дишем. Говорим, 1992)
- Rosy Lizard Runs Across the Rain (Rumen gušter kišu pretrčava / Румен гуштер кишу претрчава, 1994)
- Striptease, (Striptiz / Стриптиз, 1994), slang poetry
- Loud Frog (Glasna gatalinka / Гласна гаталинка, 1994)
- Virgin Byzantium (Devičanska Vizantija / Девичанска Византија, 1994)
- Storm Spittle (Ispljuvak oluje / Испљувак олује, 1995)
- Tsar Trojan's Goat Ears (U cara Trojana kozje uši / У цара Тројана козје уши, 1995), gestual poetry
- Planet (Planeta / Планета, 1996)
- Stink bug (Smrdibuba / Смрдибуба, 1997), slang poetry
- Electric chair (Električna stolica / Електрична столица, 1998 ), slang poetry
- Stars' Trowel (Zvezdana mistrija / Звездана мистрија, 1998)
- Prescription for liver inflammation (Recept za zapaljenje jetre / Рецепт за запаљење јетре, 1999)
- Azure Dream (Azurni san / Азурни сан, 2000)
- Shot into Shit (Pucanj u govno / Пуцањ у говно, 2001)
- Speech Burning (Gori govor / Гори говор, 2002)
- Phonets and Other Poems (Foneti i druge pesme / Фонети и друге песме, 2005)
- Parallel Worlds (Paralelni svetovi / Паралелни светови, 2006)
- Blue Wind (Plavi vetar / Плави ветар, 2006)
- Wound, Word and Poem (Rana, reč i pesma / Рана, реч и песма, 2007)
- Golden Fleece (Zlatno runo / Златно руно, 2007)
- Pig is Excellent Swimmer and Other Poems (Svinja je odličan plivač i druge pesme / Свиња је одличан пливач и друге песме, 2009)
- Storm Lover (Ljubavnik oluje / Љубавник олује, 2009)
- Hunger for Unspeakable (Glad za neizgovorljivim / Глад за неизговорљивим, 2010)
- Кyborg (Kiborg / Киборг, 2013).

=== Prose books ===
- I Just Opened my Mail (Tek što sam otvorila poštu / Тек што сам отворила пошту, 2000), epistolary novel
- Walked Into my Ear (Došetalo mi u uvo / Дошетало ми у уво, 2005), slang stories
- Diary 1982 (Dnevnik / Дневник, 2006)
- Window (Prozor / Прозор, 2006), dreams
- Slang Stories (Šatro priče / Шатро приче, 2007)
- Bark at My Sole (Laj mi na đon / Лај ми на ђон, 2007), slang stories, internet edition
- Shocking Blue (Šoking blu / Шокинг блу, 2007), slang novel
- Soaked in Henhouse (Kisnem u kokošinjcu / Киснем у кокошињцу, 2008), slang rants
- Hurts my Dick (Boli me blajbinger / Боли ме блајбингер, 2009), slang novel
- Osier Bag (Torba od vrbovog pruća / Торба од врбовог прућа, 2010), short stories
- Diary of Signalism 1979-1983 (Dnevnik signalizma 1978-1983 / Дневник сигнализма 1978-1983, 2012)
- The Diary 1985 (Dnevnik 1985 / Дневник 1985, 2012)
- Apeiron (Internet edition 2013)

=== Essays and polemics ===
- Signalism (in English, 1973)
- Signalism (Signalizam / Сигнализам, 1979)
- Zipper for Morons (Štep za šumindere / Штеп за шуминдере) (1984), note: a settlement with false avant-garde
- Cocks from Baylon Square (Pevci sa Bajlon-skvera / Певци са Бајлон-сквера, 1986) note: a settlement with Serbian traditionalism
- Diary of Avant-garde (Dnevnik avantgarde / Дневник авангарде, 1990)
- Liberated Language (Oslobođeni jezik / Ослобођени језик, 1992)
- Play and Imagination (Igra i imaginacija / Игра и имагинација, 1993)
- Chaos and Cosmos (Haos i Kosmos / Хаос и Космос, 1994)
- Towards the Source of Things (Ka izvoru stvari / Ка извору ствари, 1995)
- Planetary Culture (Planetarna kultura / Планетарна култура, 1995)
- Grammatology Thirst (Žeđ gramatologije / Жеђ граматологије, 1996)
- Signalism Yugoslav creative movement (in English, 1998)
- Miscellanea (2000)
- Poetics of Signalism (Poetika signalizma / Поетика сигнализма, 2003)
- Courses of Neo-Avant-garde (Tokovi neoavangarde / Токови неоавангарде, 2004)
- Language and Unspeakable (Jezik i neizrecivo / Језик и неизрециво, 2011)
- The time of Neo-Avant-garde (Vreme neoavangarde / Време неоавангарде, 2012)
- Reality and Utopia (Stvarnost i utopija / Стварност и утопија, 2013)
- Spaces of Signalism (Prostori signalizma / Простори сигнализма, 2014)
- Nemo propheta in patria (2014)

=== Books for children ===
- Mouse in Kindergarten (Miš u obdaništu / Миш у обданишту, 2001)
- Crazymeter (Blesomer / Блесомер, 2003).

=== Book-works ===
- Fortran (1972)
- Approaches (1973)
- Signal-Art (1980)
- Zlatibor (1990)
- Forest Honey (Šumski med / Шумски мед, 1992).

=== Anthologies (editor) ===
- Signalist Poetry (“Signal”, 1971)
- Concrete, Visual and Signalist Poetry, ("Delo", 1975)
- Mail Art - Mail Poetry, ("Delo", 1980).

=== Solo exhibitions ===
- Trip to Astroland (Belgrade 1969)
- Trip to Astroland-Hotbed (Niš 1969)
- Kyberno (Belgrade 1969)
- Drawings, Signalist and Computer Poetry (Novi Sad 1969)
- Signalist explorations 1. (Communication, Eye) (Belgrade 1973)
- Mail Art (Belgrade 1981)
- Think About Signalism (Belgrade 1983)
- Signalist Research, Visual Poetry, Mail Art, (Vršac 1983)
- Signal Art (Retrospective Exhibition, Belgrade 1984)
- Conquered Space (Belgrade 1994/95)
- Signalism (San Francisco, 1997)

=== Some works in English ===
- Manifestos and other Essays
- Courses Of Signalism
- Poetry
- Poetical Diaries (1959–1968.)
- Fragments on Mail Art
- Planetary Communication (My mail art activities from 1970 to 1987)
- The Russian Neo-Avantgarde: Visual Poetry and Mail Art
- Third millennium spirituality
