= Ignjat Job =

Serbian painter

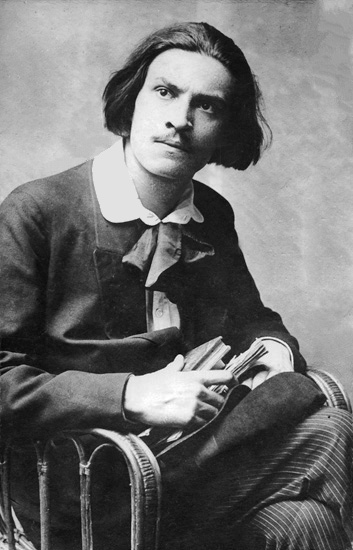
- at age 20
- Born: 28 March 1895; Dubrovnik, Austria-Hungary
- Died: 28 April 1936 (aged 41); Zagreb, Yugoslavia
- Known for: painting

Ignjat "Ignjo" Job (Serbian Cyrillic: Игњат Јоб; 28 March 1895 – 28 April 1936) was an important representative of colour expressionism in the art scene of Yugoslavia during the 1930s. Job's landscapes of Dalmatia are reminiscent of the style of Van Gogh. He is best known for his series of paintings inspired by life on the island of Brač. Job said that “the beneficial influence of the Brač landscape can be felt, the hot sun, blue sea, and green branches of olive trees swayed by the breath of the maestral”. His paintings depicted the Mediterranean landscape, motifs of the town of Supetar, fishing themes, and more rarely portraits and nudes.

== Life and career ==
Ignjat Job was born in Dubrovnik on 28 March 1895. His family hailed from Udine, modern-day Italy, but came to identify first as Catholic Serbs and then as Croats; Job himself identified as a Serb. Job's father died when Job was 5 years old. He attended school in Dubrovnik until 1910. An important influence on his early intellectual and artistic development was his older brother Cvijeto (1892–1915), whose art studies in Belgrade and Munich came to an end when he went off to fight in the First World War for the Serbian Army.

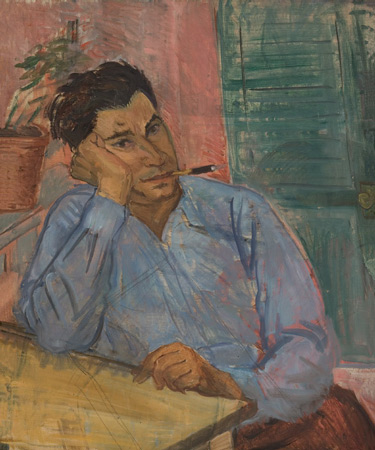
Self-portrait (Autoportret), oil on canvas, 1931

As an active supporter for independence from Austria-Hungary, the young Ignjat Job was arrested in 1912 along with other young nationalists and sentenced to one month in prison. In 1913, when Job was 18, his daughter, Marija, was born. Arrested again in 1914, he spent time in Šibenik prison, then removed to a mental hospital, thanks to good connections, until September 1916. Traumatic experiences from his two-year stay in the mental hospital oppressed Job in the years that followed, and left a mark on his work, most notably on Madmen in the Yard, a drawing thought to have been made between 1916 and 1919.

In 1917 Job moved to Zagreb with his mother and younger brother Nikola, where he enrolled in the Arts and Crafts College (Viša škola za umjetnost i umjetni obrt). Job fell in love, and married Viktorija Oršić. After spending the summer in Dubrovnik and on Lopud, the couple moved back to Zagreb for the autumn. However, the relationship was not to last, and they divorced in 1920. In that same year, Job's mother died, and due to irregular attendance, he lost his place at college. The family fortune had been used up in enforced war loans, the purchase of the flat in Zagreb, and the education of the children. Job now found himself dependent on the goodwill of friends, and increasingly prone to bouts of depression and ill-health.

In December 1920, Job went to Italy, visiting Rome, Naples and Capri. Travelling back through Dubrovnik and Zagreb, he went on to Belgrade, spending time there with local modernist artists - most notably Petar Dobrović. There also, in 1923, Job met and married his second wife, Živka Cvetković, and their daughter Cvijeta was born in the summer of 1924.

In the spring of 1925 Job was diagnosed with tuberculosis, and spent the summer being treated at Ovčar-Kablar Gorge, after which the family moved to the village of Kulina, near Kruševac. There he painted his memories of the coast, mostly on small panels. Job converted to Orthodox Christianity and married his second wife in the Church of Saint Sava in Belgrade. Job's son Rastko, named after his godfather the writer Rastko Petrović, was born in October 1925. He soon fell ill and died in March of the following year. The death of his infant son left a deep impression on Job's mental and emotional state.

In the summer of 1927 the family moved to Vodice, near Šibenik, and from 1928 they lived in Supetar on the island of Brač. There, Job embarked on the most creative time of his artistic career, and his style began to resemble that of Van Gogh. Job's focus was on recording the impulse of his personal feelings, and strong expressiveness became a feature of his work. The following year, 1929, he held his first solo exhibition in Split, which was well received by public and critics alike. By his next solo exhibition at the Salon Galić in Split, Job's style had developed more toward expressionism.

Between 1934 and 1935, Job lived in Belgrade and Zagreb, then returned to Supetar. He died of tuberculosis in a Zagreb clinic on 28 April 1936.

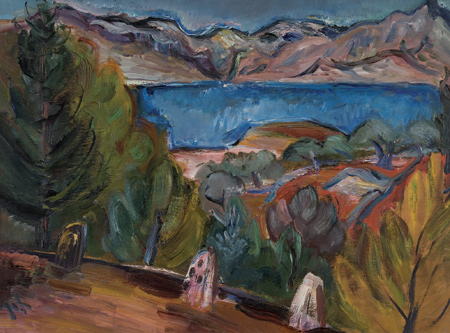
Landscape (Pejzaž), oil on panel, 1935

== Style ==
Ignjat Job's best, most creative and expressive work was produced in a very short period of time. In the early 1920s, his painting still shows the influence of the Spring Salon, with rounded forms in more muted colours. However, inspired by the scenes of his native Dalmatia, and driven by his own personal demons, Job went on to become one of the most expressive painters in the Croatian modern art scene of the 1920s and 30s. In his later works he demonstrated fauvism techniques and strong, expressive use of colour. Job saw landscape as a symbol, and used colour as an expression of his emotions, his personal experience of life and his reaction to the environment and its native people. His art was grounded in the earthy island lifestyle, and he pursued his own personal vision. As the critic Igor Zidić says "All of the content in Job's work, from 1928 to his death, are locally and regionally marked, always concrete, borrowed from the real world and the little towns of Dalmatia in which he scrimped and lived, full of ambiental tone and colour, melodies, events and figures... He was a careful observer, with a lot of sense for humour, for the comic and tragicomic, for the mad, the ridiculous, the fantastic and the drunk."

== Legacy ==
Job's works have been included in the anthologies of Croatian, Serbian, and Yugoslav art.

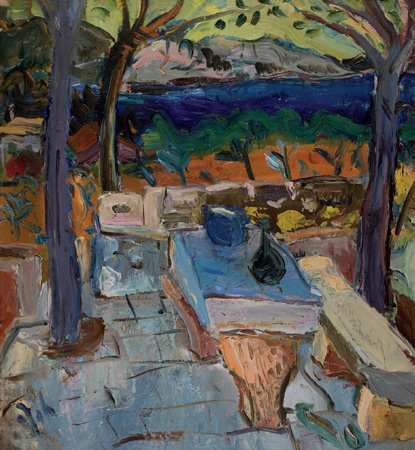
Job's 1935 oil on canvas Stone Table (Kameni stol) appeared in a series of stamps of Croatian Modern Art issued by the Croatian Post.

== Works ==
Images of Ignjat Job's paintings can be seen online at the Adris Group website, Arte Galerija, Galerija Remek-Djela and Branislav Dešković Gallery in Bol.

- Santa Maria, 1921
- Coastal Village (Primorsko selo), 1925
- Mountain Landscape (Planinski pejzaž), 1927
- Fish Market (Riblja Piaca), 1927
- Prayer (Molitva), 1927-8
- Self-portrait with Hat (Autoportret sa šeširom), 1928-9
- My House in Supetar (Moj dom u Supetru), 1929
- Madmen (Ludaci), 1929
- Mr. Bepo (Šjor Bepo), 1929
- Fields (Polje), 1930
- Village (Selo), 1930
- Landscape (Pejzaž), 1930
- After Harvest (Poslije berbe), 1930
- Landscape with the Artist's House (Pejzaž sa umetnikovim domom), 1930
- Minčeta with Palm (Minčeta s palmom), 1931
- Self-portrait (Autoportret), 1931
- Landscape Through Pines and Olives (Pejzaž kroz bore i maslina), 1931
- Innocent (Bezazleni), 1931
- Female Nude (Ženski akt), 1931
- Portrait of Liza Križanić (Portret Lize Križanić), 1931
- Landscape with House (Pejzaž s kućom), 1932
- Landscape with Church (Pejzaž s crkvom), 1932
- Grouper (Škarpina), 1932
- House Beneath the Hill (Kuća pod bregom), 1932
- Fighting in the Bar (Tučnjava u gostionici), 1932
- On the Terrace (Na terasi), 1932
- Courtyard (Dvorište), 1932
- Return from the Harvest (Povratak s berbe), 1932-3
- Gripe, 1933-4
- Vela Glavica I, 1933
- Vela Glavica II, 1933
- Sunday (Nedelja), 1933
- Primorski Landscape (Pines) (Primorski pejzaž (Borovi)), 1933
- Courtyard with Flowers (Dvorište sa cvećem), 1934
- Reclining Nude (Ležeći akt), 1934
- Fishermen Before the Storm (Ribari pred oluju), 1934
- Landscape (Pejzaž), 1935
- Sea and Trees (More i borovi), 1935
- Inn (Krčma), 1935
- Wine Pressing (Turnanje vina), 1935
- Olives I (Masline I), 1935
- Stone Table (Kameni stol), 1935

== Exhibitions ==
During his lifetime, Ignjat Job held exhibitions of his work in Split, Zagreb and Belgrade.

=== Solo exhibitions ===
Recent exhibitions of his work include:

- 2007 Adris Gallery
- 1997 Ignjat Job, Art Pavilion in Zagreb
- 2013, National Museum of Serbia

=== Group exhibitions ===
- 2009 100 Godina Srpske Umetnosti, National Museum, Belgrade
- 2007 and 2008 From the holdings of the museum - Museum of Modern Art Dubrovnik, Dubrovnik

=== Public collections ===
His work can be found in the following public collections:

Croatia

- Modern Gallery, Zagreb, Croatia
- Gallery of Fine Arts, Split
- Gallery of Fine Arts, Zadar
- Galerija umjetnina Branislav Dešković, Bol, island of Brač, Croatia
- Museum of Modern Art Dubrovnik, Dubrovnik

Serbia

- Pavle Beljanski Memorial Collection, Novi Sad
- Museum of Contemporary Art (Muzej Savremene Umetnosti), Belgrade
- National Museum of Serbia
- Parliament of Serbia
- Belgrade City Museum

== Gallery ==
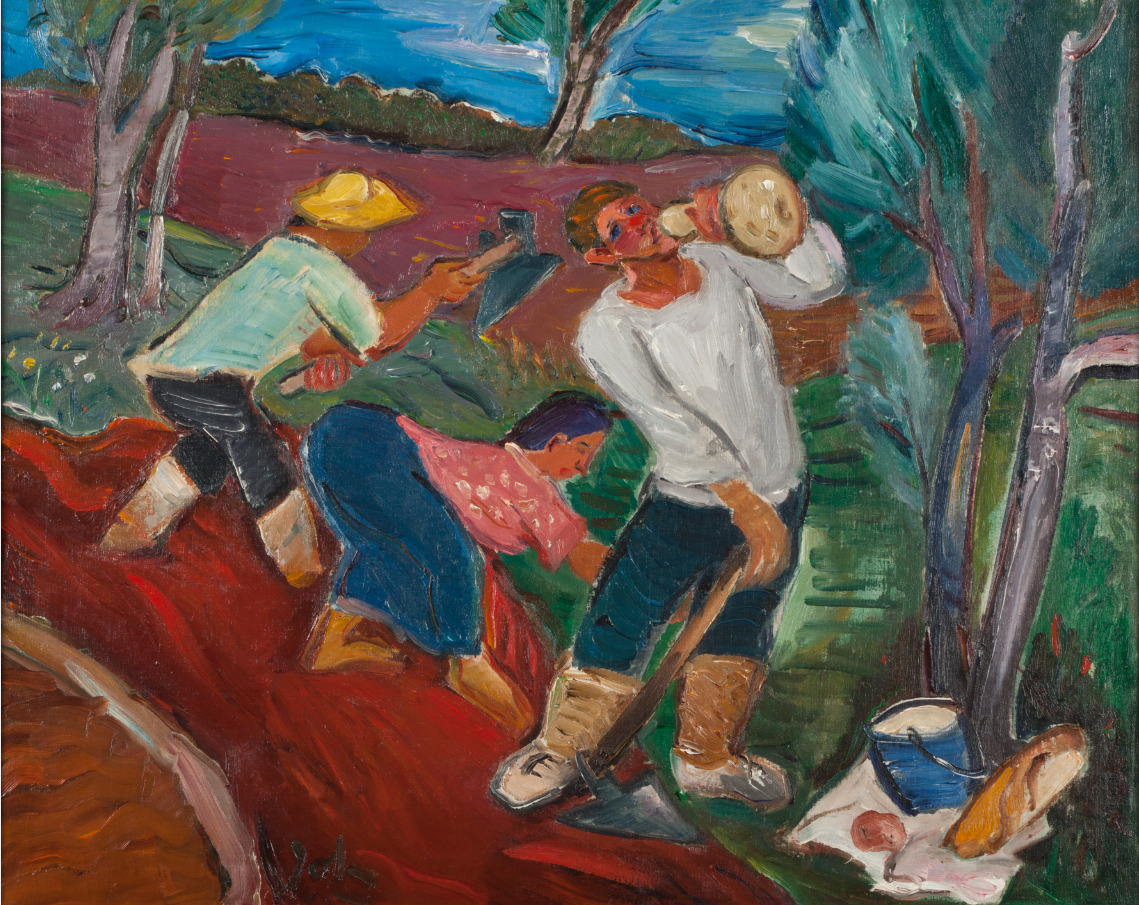
Kopači ("Diggers")

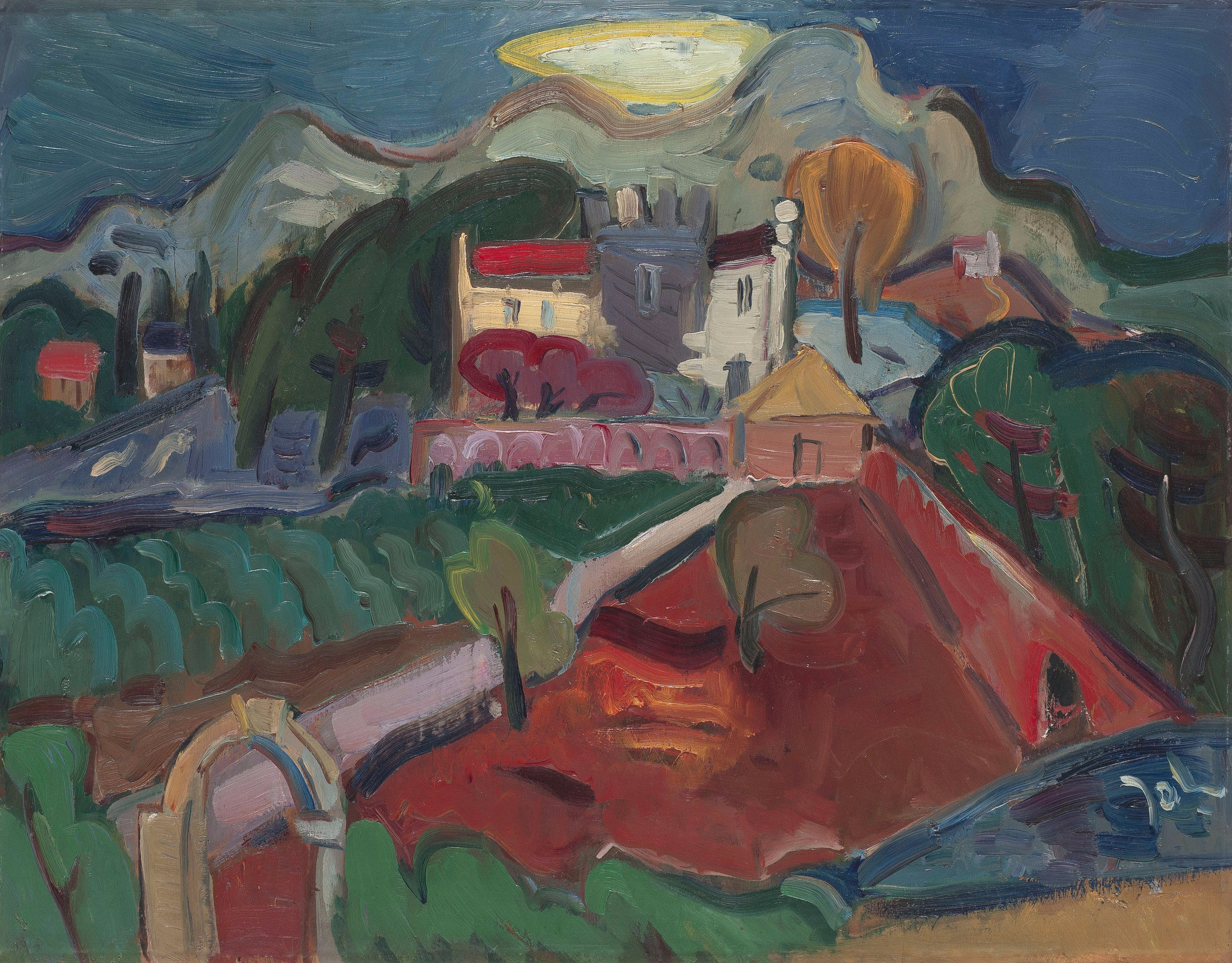
Lumbarda ("Countryside in Lumbarda")

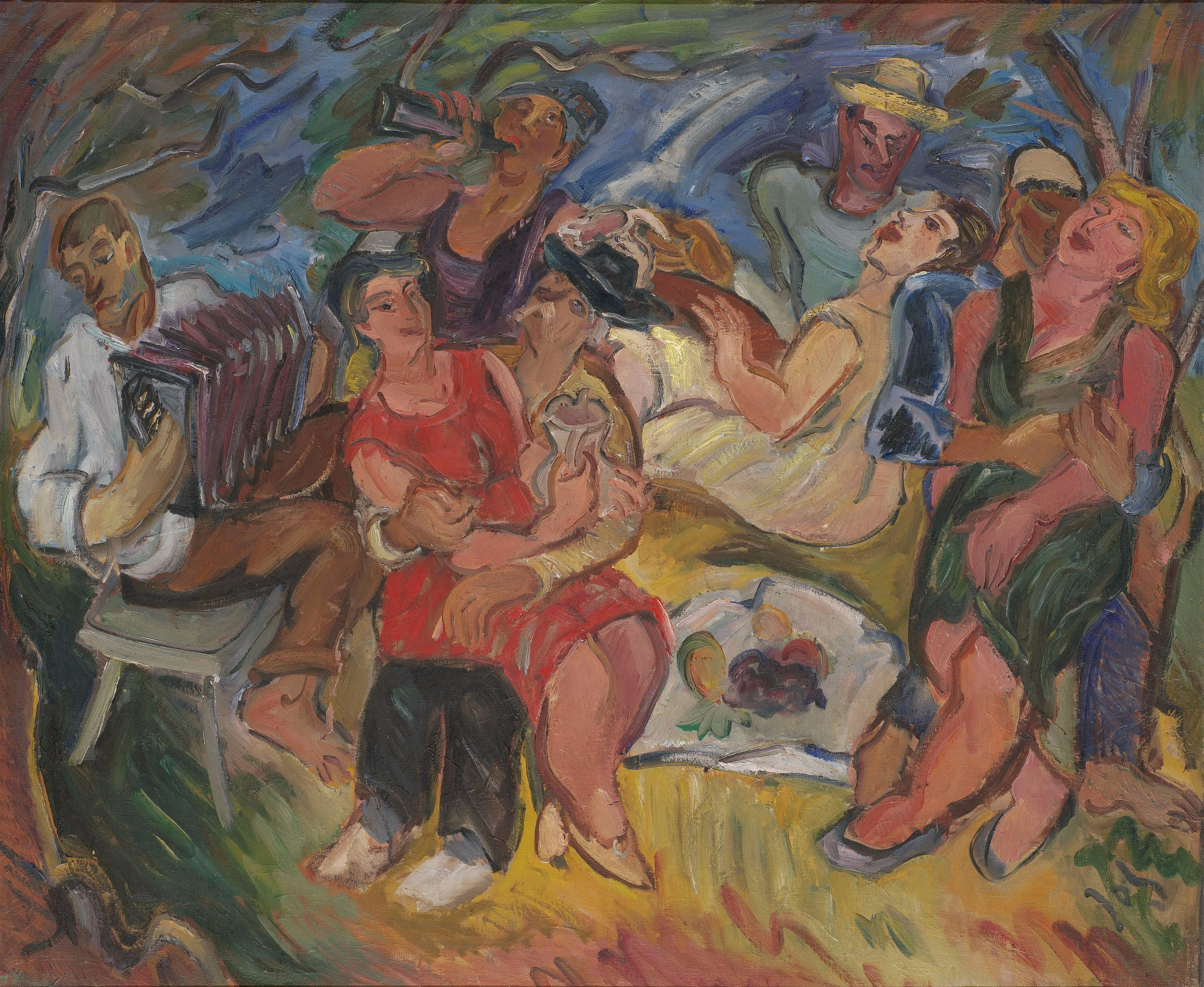
Sunday

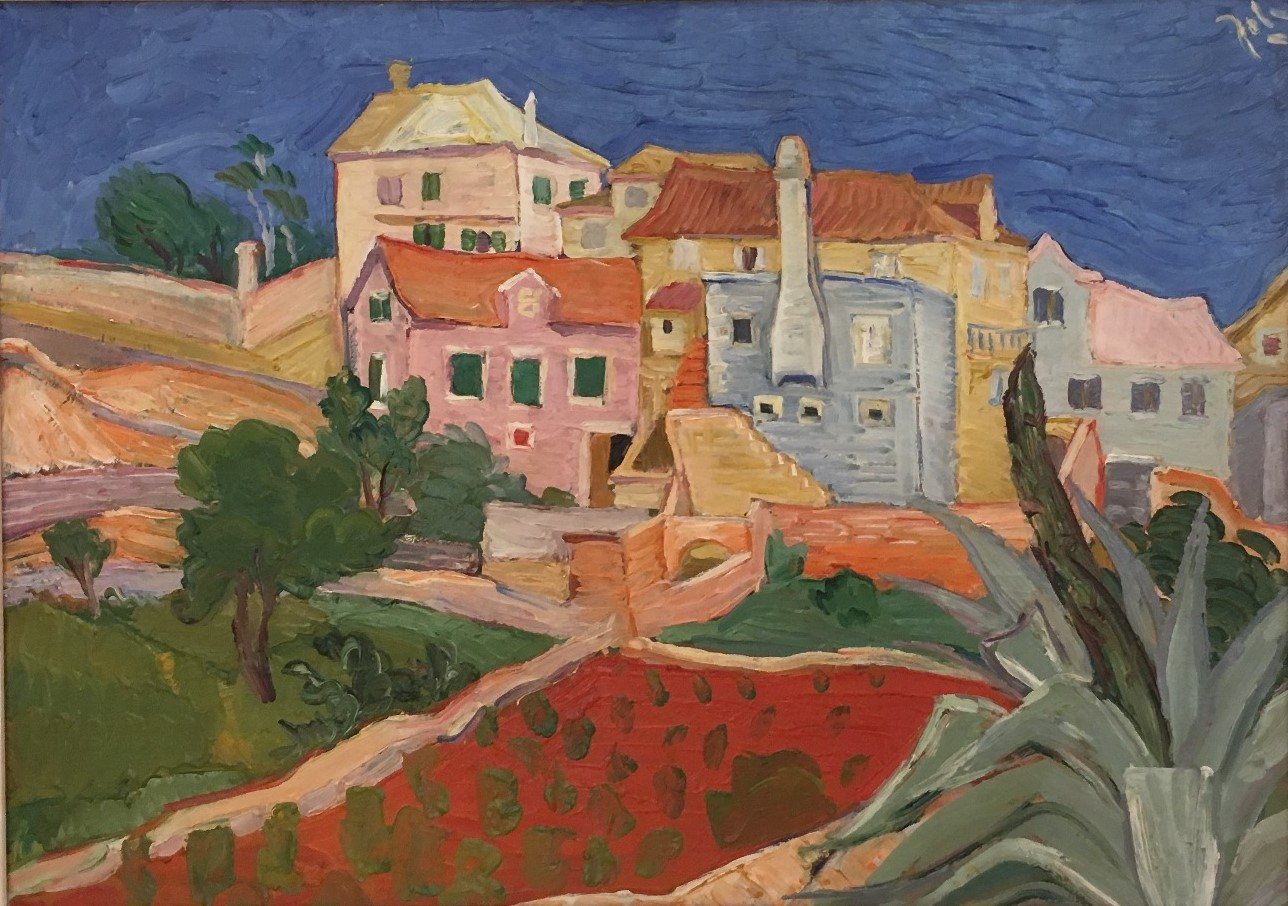
Moj dom u Supetaru, 1929 ("My home in Supetar")

== See also ==
- Marko Murat
