= Deisler =

Deisler is a surname. Notable people with the surname include:

- Guillermo Deisler (1940–1995), Chilean stage designer, visual poet, and mail artist
- Sebastian Deisler (born 1980), German footballer
