= Signalism =

Neo-avant-garde literary and art movement

Symbol of Signalism

Signalism (Serbo-Croatian: Сигнализам, Signalizam; from Latin: signum, lit. 'sign, signal') represents an international neo-avant-garde literary and art movement. It gathered wider support base both in former Yugoslavia and the world in the late 1960s and the beginning of the 1970s.

== The origins and methods of Signalism ==
The beginning of Signalism dates back to 1959 when its founder and main theoretician Miroljub Todorović started with his linguistic experiments. His main belief was that there can be no significant leap forward in poetry without revolutionizing its main medium – the language.

The birth of Signalism in Serbian literature and culture, with its tendency to revolutionize other arts as well (visual, theater, comics, music and movies), came from the need to eliminate the spent models carried on by poetic and cultural traditions, as well as from the necessity to take on the challenges and spirit of the modern technological and electronic civilization. In its program ("Manifesto" and other guiding texts) as well as in its art pieces, Signalism made a clean break from the principles of neoromantism and late symbolism still governing Serbian literature. Its goal was set to radically change poetry both through content and form, and make it compatible with the contemporary times.

Revolutionizing of the poetic language started with the introduction of the symbols, formulas and linguistic forms of the "hard" sciences (physics, biology, chemistry, mathematics, biochemistry and astronomy). Furthermore, the language was made visual by dispersing words and sentences into syllables and letters forming visually recognizable patterns, as well as by introducing non-verbal symbols into the text (drawings, photographs, graphs.) for the purpose of creating a collage of verbal and visual elements. This first phase of Signalism is often referred to as Scientism, with the most prominent examples including the books "Planeta" (Planet, 1965) and "Putovanje u Zvezdaliju" (A trip to Starland, 1971) as well as poetry cycles "Belančevina" (Protein), "Kiseonik" (Oxygen), "Ožilište" (Nursery) and others in which the topics are Space, Time and Matter.

In there for decade long research and creative pursuit that followed, Signalists significantly expanded cognitive boundaries and genre profile of modern Serbian poetry. Signalist poetry can be divided into two main forms: verbal and non-verbal. Verbal poetry consists of scientist, aleatoric (random), stochastic, technological, phenomenological, slang and apeironistic poetry. Non-verbal poetry subtypes include visual, object, sound and gestual poetry.

Signalism made significant advances in prose (experimental novel and short story). There is also a number of significant Signalist children literature accomplishments. In visual art strides are made in body art, mail art, performance and conceptual art.

Three manifestos helped define Signalism as a neo-avant-garde movement that negates literal, artistic and cultural heritage, poetic and aesthetic conventions and canonical ways of creativity by insisting on creative experimentation – "Manifesto of scientific poetry" (1968), "Signalist manifesto (Regulae poesis)" (1969) and "Signalism" (1970).

The movement was significantly boosted by the international magazine "Signal", inaugurated in 1970. Nine issues of "Signal" appeared between 1970 and 1973, presenting a number of domestic and international artists, as well as printing bibliographical data about the avant-garde publications all around the world. From 1973 until 1995 magazine could not be published, mainly for financial reasons. From 1995 to 2004 another 21 issues of "Signal" appeared. The new release of "Signal" revitalized the Signalist movement and brought an army of young artists into the movement in 21st century.

On the work of Miroljub Todorović and Signalism movement that he had founded, three doctoral dissertations have been defended: Dr. Julian Kornhauser, Jagiellonian University in Kraków, Poland, 1980; Dr. Živan Živković, Faculty of Philology in Belgrade, 1991 and Dr. Milivoje Pavlović, University of Kosovska Mitrovica, 2002. Twenty monographs have also been published on the same subject.

== Important international contributors of the "Signal" magazine ==
- Raoul Hausmann, dadaist, the founder of Berlin Dada in 1918.
- Augusto de Campos, one of the initiators of the concrete poetry.
- Michele Perfetti, mail-artist, critic and theoretician of neo-avant-garde, wrote about Signalism on numerous occasions.
- Adriano Spatola, Italian poet, editor of the experimental poetry magazine "Tam Tam".
- Clemente Padin, visual poet and theoretician, wrote about "Signalism" numerous times, editor of the neo-avant-garde magazine "Ovum 10" in Uruguay)
- Julien Blaine, visual poet, performer, mail and conceptual artist. The editor of one of the best neo-avant-garde magazines "Doc(k)s"
- Sarenco, visual poet, performer, anthologist, founder and editor of the Italian neo-avant-garde magazine "Lotta Poetica"
- Eugenio Miccini, one of the most prominent Italian visual poets and theoretician of neo-avant-garde
- Richard Kostelanetz, visual poet, theoretician of neo-avant-garde, anthologist, editor of the "Assembling"
- Guillermo Deisler, Chilean visual poet, critic and anthologist
- Bob Cobbing, English concrete poet and theoretician of sound poetry
- Eugen Gomringer, concrete poet and theoretician, one of the founders of concrete poetry
- Pierre Garnier, concrete poet and theoretician, founder of French spatialism, the space poetry
- Enzo Minarelli, main representative of the Italian "poesia visiva"—the visible poetry
- Keiichi Nakamura, Japanese visual and mail-artist.
- Dick Higgins, visual poet and theoretician of neo-avant-garde, editor of the publishing company "Something Else Press"
- Dmitry Bulatov, Russian visual poet, theoretician and anthologist
- Sol LeWitt, one of the most prominent American conceptualists
- Shozo Shimamoto, a member of the famous Japanese neo-avant-garde group "Gutai"
- Dr. Klaus Peter Dencker, visual poet and theoretician who put together one of the cult anthologies of visual poetry "Text-Bilder"
- Ruggero Maggi, Italian visual poet, painter and mail-artist
- Daniel Daligand, French visual poet, mail-artist and critic
- Willi R. Melnikov, Russian visual poet, mail-artist and performer
- Kum-Nam Baik, South Korean mail-artist
- On Kawara, American conceptual artist
- Klaus Groh, neo-dadaist, the founder of the neo-dadaist center in Germany and author of numerous anthologies and collections of visual poetry, mail-art and conceptual art.

== International anthologies containing works of Signalists ==
- Maurizio Spatola «Poesia Sperimentale», Turin, Italy, 1970
- Guillermo Deisler «Poesia Visiva en el Mundo», Antofagasta, Chile, 1972
- Klaus Peter Dencker, «Text-Bilder Visuele Poesie International Von der Antike bis zur Gegenwart», Koln, Germany, 1972
- Klaus Groh, «Visuel-Konkret-International», Gersthofen, Germany, 1973
- Fernando Millan and Jesus Garcia Sanches, «La escritura en libertad», Madrid, Spain, 1975
- Alan Riddel, «Typewriter Art», London, England, 1975
- G. J. De Rook, «Historische anthologie visuele poezie», Brussels, Belgium, 1976
- Josep M. Figueres and Manuel de Seabra, «Antologia da poesia visual Europeia», Lisbon, Portugal, 1977
- Sarenco, «Poesia e prosa delle avangardie», Brescia, Italy, 1978
- Julien Blaine, «Mail Artists in the World», Paris, France, 1978
- Julian Kornhauser, «Tragarze zdan», Kraków-Wroclaw, Poland, 1983
- Enrico Marscelloni and Sarenco, «poesia totale 1897-1997: Dal colpo di dadi alla poesia visuale», Mantua, Italy, 1998
- Dmitry Bulatov, «Точка зрения. Визуальная поэзия: 90-е годы / Točka zrenija. Vizualnaja poezija. 90-e godi", Kaliningrad, Russia, 1998

Three anthologies were also published in Serbia: "Signalist poetry" (1971), "Concrete, visual and signalist poetry" (1975), "Mail-Art Mail-Poetry" (1980), as well as several collections and almanacs.

== The most important authors and works of Signalism ==
Many poets, writers and painters accepted the basic concepts of Signalism, further developing and spreading the ideas of this Serbian (Yugoslav) neo-avant-garde movement.

Besides the founder of Signalism Miroljub Todorović (Kyberno, 1970; The Pig is an Excellent Swimmer, 1971; Bumpkin Shows Off, slang poetry, 1974; Insect on the Temple, 1978; Algol, 1980, Textum, 1981; Chinese Erotism, 1983; Knock-Out, 1984; I Mount Rocinante Again, 1987; Water-Snake Drinks Water, 1988; The Diary of Avant-Garde, 1990; Electric Chair, slang poetry, 1998; I’ve Just Opened my Mail, 2000; It Walked Into my Ear, slang stories, 2005; Blue Wind, 2006; Slang Stories, 2007;) important contributors to the theory and practice of Signalism include Marina Abramović, Vlada Stojiljković, Zvonimir Kostić Palanski, Slobodan Pavićević (Flowers’ Silicates, 1973; Roadworks, 1984), Milivoje Pavlović (White Book, 1974; The World In Signals, 1996), Zoran Popović, Ljubiša Jocić (Moonshine in Tetrapack, 1975; What’s the Time, 1976: Essays on Signalism, 1994), Jaroslav Supek, Zvonko Sarić (Overcoat until the Dawn, 2001; Soul Catcher, 2003), Bogislav Marković (Altai Dust, 2006), Ilija Bakić (Prenatal Life, 1997; New Babylon, 1998; Protoplasm, 2003; The Autumn of Gatherers, 2007; To be Continued, 2009), Slobodan Škerović (Indigo, 2005; All Colors of Arcturus, 2006; Chimera or Borg, 2008), Žarko Đurović (The World of Signalism, 2002), Dušan Vidaković, Dobrivoje Jevtić, Dejan Bogojević, Andrej Tišma, Dobrica Kamperelić, Milivoj Anđelković, Zoran Stefanović and others.

== Critical reception ==
Numerous domestic and international critics and theoreticians hold Signalism in high regard:

Prof. Miloš Bandić: "Signalism is – after Zenitism, Surrealism and the movement of social literature – the next and autochthonous literary and artistic movement in Serbian literature of 20th century. At the same time, in contemporary Yugoslav literature and culture, Signalism is confirmed as an exclusive modern dimension and a separate artistic form and production. Without it all would probably be poorer and who knows how deprived."

Oskar Davičo, famous writer: "For the first time from the appearance of Surrealism in the twenties, we can joyfully confirm that with exploration of Miroljub Todorović, Serbian poetry can again catch up with the genuine worldwide avant-garde explorations."

Zoran Markuš, visual arts critic: "Signalism is our parallel phenomena within the brackets of the most extreme avant-garde and that explains its international expansion, approval and importance in certain artistic and intellectual circles."

Dave Oz, Canadian multimedia artist: "True essence of Signalism is that it expects appearance of planetary consciousness."

Gillo Dorfles, Italian arts theoretician: "Signalism means a step forward, in relation to concrete poetry, visual poetry and the art of the sign."

Prof. Milivoje Pavlović: "Thanks to Miroljub Todorović and the group that follows him, Signalism with its mainstream represents the arc which connects in a creative manner avant-garde aims from the period between wars with the contemporary epoch, bringing valuable innovations and connecting Serbian art with the modern world’s processes." (From the book The Keys of Signalist Poetics)

== See also ==
- Art of Yugoslavia
- Zenitism
