= Sićevo Literary Colony =

- Founded: 1991
- Founder: Mihajlo Ignjatović; Society of Writers and Literary Translators of Niš
- Headquarters: Sićevo, Serbia
- Website: kolonija.drustvoknjizevnika.com

The Sićevo Literary Colony is an international creative event in Serbia, established in 1991 by the Society of Writers and Literary Translators of Niš and Mihajlo Ignjatović. It is held at the Art Colony building in the village of Sićevo, near the Sićevo Gorge, about fifteen kilometers east of Niš.

Today, the event is organized by the Cultural Center of Niš under the patronage of the City of Niš and the Ministry of Culture of Serbia, with the Society of Writers and Literary Translators of Niš as co-organizer.

The colony gathers writers, literary critics, translators, publishers, and other participants from Serbia and abroad. Its mission is to foster literary creativity, exchange ideas, and strengthen the connection between authors and readers. Participants may work on their own projects or simply gather inspiration and notes during their stay.

Since 2005, the event has been recognized as a public city manifestation, organized by the Cultural Center of Niš under the patronage of the City of Niš and the Ministry of Culture of Serbia.

== Awards ==
The colony presents several literary awards:

- Ramonda Serbica Award – for lifetime achievement in Serbian literature.
- Mikina Čaša Award – in memory of the colony's founder, Mihajlo Ignjatović.
- Sićevo Vision Recognition – awarded to an outstanding domestic or international participant for their contribution to the colony.

== Mission ==
The Sićevo Literary Colony aims to provide a supportive and inspiring environment for literary creation, encourage intercultural dialogue, and promote Serbian literature internationally. Through literary evenings, book presentations, debates, and excursions, it fosters closer interaction between authors and audiences.
