= Dalibor Popović Pop =

- Далибор Поповић Поп
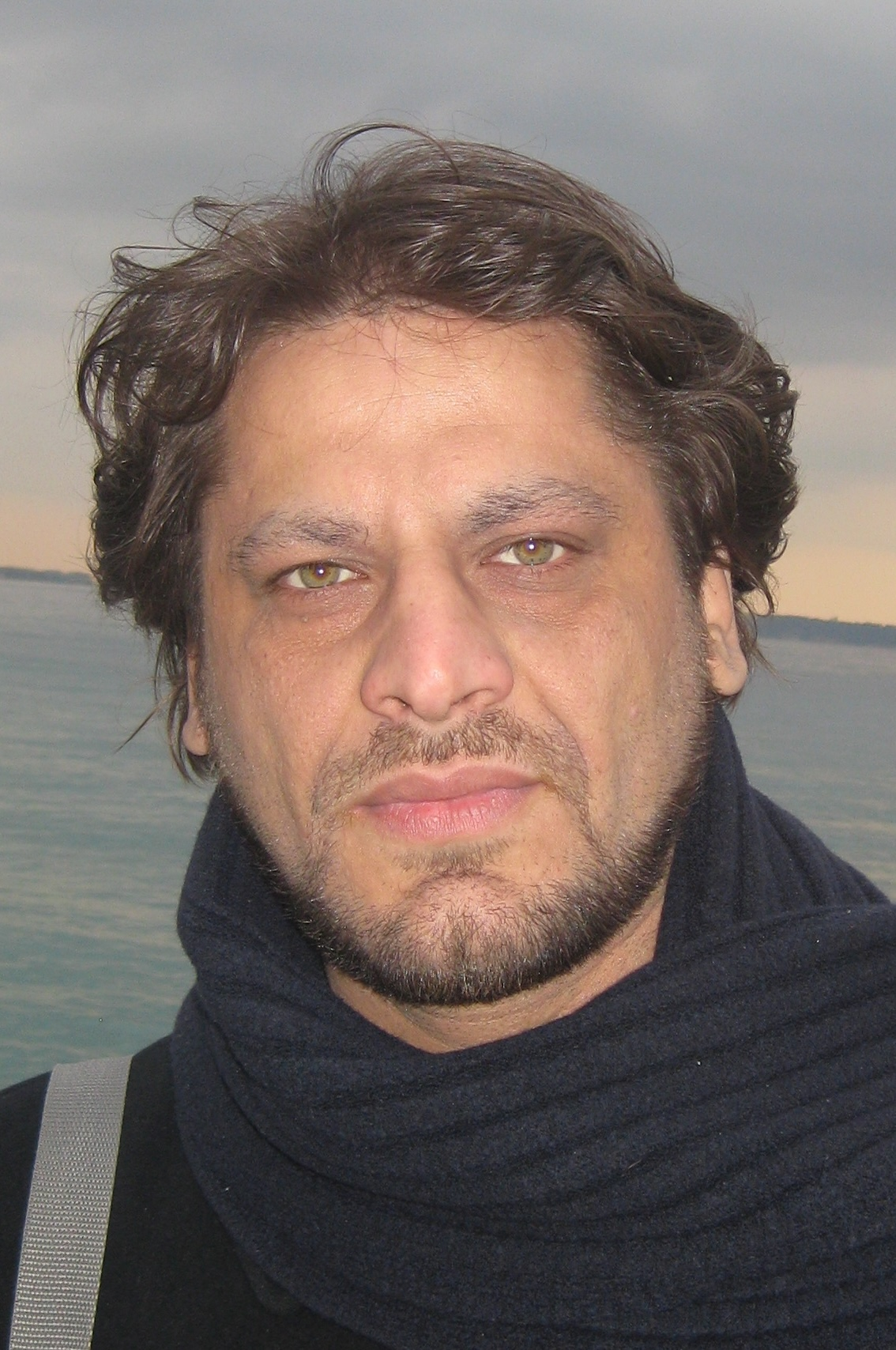
- Popović in 2012
- Born: February 18, 1979 (age 47); Niš, SFR Yugoslavia (now Serbia)
- Occupations: Poet, cultural manager, producer
- Writing career
- Language: Serbian
- Period: 2009–present
- Genre: Poetry
- Notable work: Između reči (Between the Words)
- Notable awards: Dejan Mančić Award (2009)

Dalibor Popović Pop (Niš, February 18, 1979) is a Serbian poet, cultural manager, and humanitarian.

== Career ==
He is a prominent figure in the cultural life of Niš, known for his work in literature, music production, and the promotion of the arts through unconventional projects.

Popović has held several key positions within the Serbian cultural and literary scene. He served as the president of the Society of Writers and Literary Translators of Niš and was the Editor-in-Chief of the literary and social issues magazine Gledišta.

In the field of music and performing arts, he was the long-time executive producer of the Nišville Jazz Festival. He also served as the vice president of the "Music Center Niš" (an association of professional musicians). As a film producer, he worked on the poetic documentary Dystrophy Blues – Diary of an Unusual Life, focusing on the life of Serbian poet Aleksandar Vojinović.

== Notable Projects ==
Popović is recognized for blending art with nature and cultural promotion:

- Mountain Concert: He is credited as the first person to transport a Steinway & Sons grand piano to a Serbian mountaintop for a performance, a project realized in collaboration with the internationally acclaimed jazz-fusion band Eyot for the "Concert for Nature".
- Vino i Grad: In 2009, he founded the "Vino i Grad" (Wine and the City) club, which focuses on promoting artists and popularizing wine culture and viticulture.

== Bibliography ==
- Između reči (Between the Words), poems, Dejan Mančić Foundation, Niš (2009). ISBN 978-86-83387-12-0.
- Propovedanje vatre (Preaching the Fire), audio recording/multimedia work dedicated to the 90th anniversary of poet Branko Miljković, Niš (2024). ISBN 978-86-80942-13-1.

== Awards ==
- In 2009, he received the "Dejan Mančić" award for his poetry collection Između reči.
