= Irina Antanasijević =

Russian-Serbian philologist (born 1965)

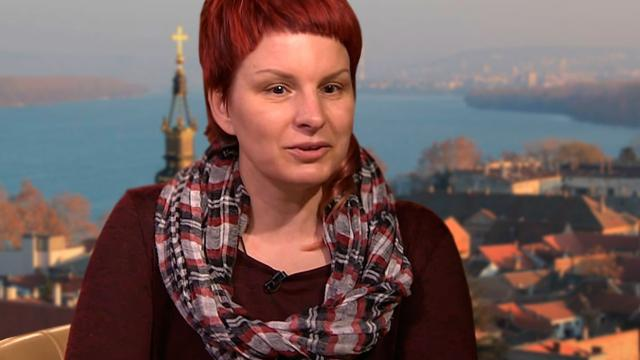
- Born: 27 June 1965 (age 61); Sievierodonetsk, Ukrainian SSR, Soviet Union
- Occupations: philologist, literary critic, translator

Irina Antanasijević (Russian: Ирина Антанасиевич, Serbian: Ирина Антанасијевић; born 27 June 1965) is a Russian and Serbian philologist, literary critic, and translator. She received her Doctor of philological sciences degree in 2002 and has been a professor of Russian literature at Philology Faculty of University in Belgrade since 2004. Her scholarly interests include folklore and post-folklore, visual literature and visual text, poetics of comics, illustration, children's literature, and history of Russian emigration studies.

== Biography ==
Born in the city of Sievierodonetsk, Luhansk Oblast, Ukrainian SSR, USSR. After arriving to Yugoslavia she lived in Split, and since 1991 till 1999 in Priština. She worked as lecturer, and then as an assistant for Russian literature at Philology Faculty in Priština. She defended her thesis "Landscape in Russian and Serbian Epic" during the NATO bombing of Yugoslavia in 1999.

She left Priština after the signing of Kumanovo Agreement (June 1999) and moved to Niš. She worked as professor of Russian literature at Philosophy Faculty in Niš and continued to work at Philosophy Faculty in Priština (with the seat in Kosovska Mitrovica). In 2002 she defended doctoral thesis Poetics of Dirge. She initiated opening of the Department for Slavistics with Balcanistics at Philology Faculty in Niš (since 2002 Department for Russian language and literature).

Professor of Russian literature at Philology Faculty of University in Belgrade. Member of Editorial Board of journal Gradina until 2009. Member of Editorial Board of periodical Facta universitatis until 2010. Member of Editorial Board of periodical Научный результат, Серия Социальные и гуманитарные исследования (Scientific Result, Series of Social and Humanitarian Studies).

She is a member of the Society of Writers and Literary Translators of Niš.

== Awards ==
- Medal of Pushkin (Russian Federation, November 24, 2021) – for a great contribution to the promotion of the Russian language and Russian culture in Serbia.

== Bibliography ==
Monographs

1. Landscape in Russian and Serbian Folk Epics (Пејзаж у руској и српској народној епици), Prosveta, Niš, 2005, ISBN 86-7455-658-2, 126 p.
2. Poetics of Russian Dirges (Поетика руских тужбалица), Prosveta, Niš, 2003, ISBN 86-7455-601-9, 210 p.
3. Folklore and Avant-garde: symbols and phenomena (Фольклор и авангард: символы и явления), Niš, Gradac: Despot Book, 2011, ISBN 978-86-88877-04-6, 253 p.
4. Russian Comics in the Kingdom of Yugoslavia (Русский комикс Королевства Югославия), Novi Sad, Komiko, 2014, ISBN 978-8687-919-36-5, 340 p.
5. Russian Classic in Pictures (Русская классика в картинках), Belgrade: Philology Faculty of University of Belgrade, 2015 (Belgrade: Belpak), Библиотека Язык и литература. Серия Русская эмиграция в Белграде ; кн. 7, ISBN 978-86-6153-322-8

Dictionaries

1. Dictionary of general words and expressions (Лексикон општих речи и израза), Budva, Kuća knjige, 2007 ISBN 978-9940-519-01-8, 753 p.
2. Dictionary, Russian-Serbian Serbian-Russian (Речник руско-српски српско-руски), Budva, Kuća knjige, 2007 ISBN 978-9940-519-00-1, 832 p.
3. Phrase book, Russian-Serbian Serbian-Russian (Разговорник руско-српски српско-руски), Budva, Kuća knjige, 2007 ISBN 978-9940-519-00-1, 192 p.

Textbooks and manuals

1. Russian for students of biology and ecology (Руски језик за студенте биологије и екологије), Niš — Srpsko Sarajevo, 2002, ISBN 86-83481-04-2, 190 p.
2. Russian for students of physics (Руски језик за студенте физике), Niš — Srpsko Sarajevo, 2001, UDK: 808. 2:53(075. 8), 185 p.
