= Dimitar Anakiev =

Serbian filmmaker and writer

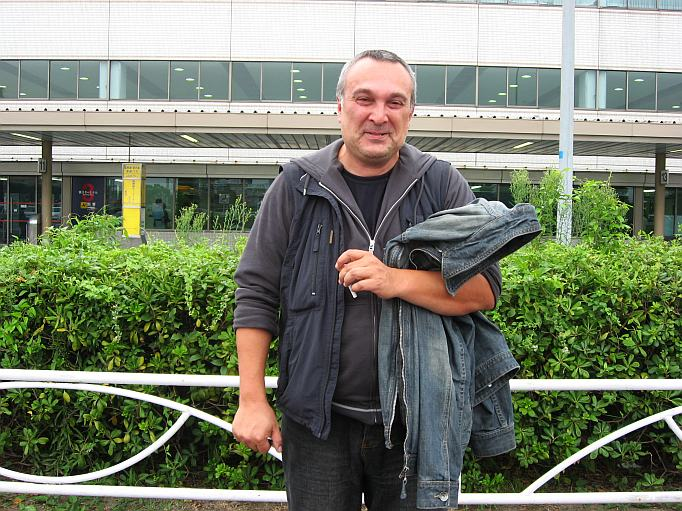
Dimitar Anakiev at Fukuoka Airport in 2007. Photo: Richard Gilbert

Dimitar Anakiev (Dimitar Grigorov Anakiev) is an independent filmmaker, writer and poet, who was born in Belgrade in 1960.

== Biography ==
He completed his medical training at the Faculty of Medicine at University of Niš in Niš, Serbia, in 1986 and worked for seven years as a medical doctor. He resided in Slovenia, beginning in 1987, but shortly thereafter and without warning found himself among the victims of administrative ethnic cleansing ("Erased"), the result of secret illegal action enacted 26 February 1992 by the democratic Slovenian government one year after the disintegration of the state of Yugoslavia. For 10 years Anakiev was compelled to live without personal documents (such as passport or personal identification), rendering him an invisible prisoner of the Slovenian democracy. At this point he purchased a small video camera and began his film career, in an attempt to make himself and other marginal Balkan people visible. The success of his films (including winning the Slovenian national film award) has made it possible for Anakiev to continue filmmaking as a producer, director and writer. His company, Dimitar Anakiev Films s.p.-DAF (now Anakiev Production) specializes in socially engaged films of the Balkans in the post-communist era. Anakiev is a founding member of the Slovenian Director Guild, and a member of the Slovenian Filmmaker Association.

He is a member of the Society of Writers and Literary Translators of Niš.

== Selected films ==
Title	Year	Length	Format	Production company	Production location
Amigo	2003	36 min	DV	KDZ Tolmin-AFC Beograd	
Rubbed Out	2004	45 min	DV	Dimitar Anakiev Films	Tolmin
Ti si jedini gazda ove kuće	2006	15 min	35 mm	DAF	Tolmin
Srpski ekseri	2007	50 min	DV	DAF-Film Fokus	Radovljica-Niš
Poslednji Žilnik	2007	61 min	DV	DAF-Film Fokus	Radovljica-Niš
Državljan A.T.	2010	60 min	HDV	Anakiev Production	Radovljica
Slovenija moja dežela	2012	51 min	HD	Anakiev Production	Radovljica
Normalno življenje	2012	86 min	HD	Anakiev Production	Radovljica
Not Allowed	2018	45 min	UHD	Anakiev Production	Radovljica

== Film awards ==
- Vesna National Award for Documentary Film, Celje, 2003
- High Artistic Achievement Golden Knight, Moscow Film Festival, 2003
- Best Documentary, DokMa 2007, international competition, Maribor, 2007
- Bronze Horseshoe 2008, Asterfest, Strumica, 2008

== Artistic credo: Life tattooed on the skin ==
"The truth is at the bottom. To find out the truth you have to go among the people of the lowest social classes. To them, life is tattooed on the skin. The more you climb the social ladder, the less truth, the more lies. People from the upper classes are usually not good for a movie camera (they are good for a TV camera) ..." (Dimitar Anakiev, from the conversation with Zdravko Duša, Lukatelce, Volče, 2019)

== Tributes ==
"Destiny of the erased people is for Mr. Anakiev an individual and collective tragedy that should actually never happen. The ultimate purpose of the film is to eliminate reasons, that caused this film to be made".

- Dr. Nikolai Jeffs, critic, University of Ljubljana

"Although Mr Anakiev is telling the story through the personal stories, he manages to show the lives of the erased through many different dimension and therefore offers a holistic picture".

- Nataša Posel, director, Amnesty International Slovenia

"Mr. Anakiev is a compassionate artist who seeks to improve life for his subjects and bring attention to the neglected, and in this, he is a rare and vital talent... Anakiev is in possession of personal methodology of documentary filmmaking which will enable him to follow destinies of his heroes with different ethnic backgrounds but at the same time to present the realities in social, political and economic circumstances..."

- Želimir Žilnik, Serbian film director

"As an erased person, Anakiev’s radical ethical act was to give up practicing medicine to become a film-maker. He helped educate a generation of Slovenians through powerful films that juxtaposed the actions of politicians and rightwing nationals with the day-to-day privations of erased people. His use of montage reflects Eisenstein’s revolutionary dialectics and, ironically, Anakiev’s film practices raise awareness of the brutal imperialism that is sometimes embedded in what we have come to think of as democracy."

- Stuart C. Aitken, anthropologist, San Diego State University

"Dimitar Anakiev has been a filmmaker from the social margin for three decades - by subject matter and by the circumstances in which he creates. He was one of the first who treated the problem of erased people in Slovenia – he also was erased for ten years himself -. His first documentary, Amigo, a portrait of Walter Dragosavljević Rutar, won the award for best documentary at the Slovenian Film Festival in Celje in 2003. He also receives awards from international festivals. He is not only independent in production, but also in film format choices: everything from a few minutes to a feature film can be found. If his films are bound by any red thread, this is the loyalty to the documentary style of work and stubborn engagement for the benefit of all possible sidekicks."

- Zdravko Duša, Slovenian screenwriter, dramaturg, translator and editor

"Dimitar Anakiev's documentaries are based on the social reality, and Anakiev uses certain procedures that are distinctly original and which help us understand the people portrayed not only as social beings, but as individuals within society.... Using filmic means, he also gives his own commentary, on the other hand, it offers viewers the feeling that the people portrayed have revealed themselves to them in some fundamental personal dimension. Perhaps this is the moment when an activist documentary can appeal to anyone, regardless of how close or far away certain topics are."

"About the film language of Dimitar Anakiev", Robert Kurent, Slovenian film base

== Poetry and essays ==
Anakiev is also an internationally renowned haiku poet, editor and essayist. Anakiev began writing haiku in 1985, and is considered the "grandfather" of many Balkan haiku projects such as Haiku novine (Haiku Newspapers, Serbia 1993), Prijatelj (Slovenia 1996) and Apokalipsa haiku edition (1996 Slovenia). He is the co-founder of the World Haiku Association with Jim Kacian and Ban'ya Natsuishi. One of the best known haiku by Anakiev was broadcast on BBC London in August 2000:

Spring evening.
The wheel of a troop carrier
crushes a lizard.

== Selected books ==
- Ptičija staza, 1995, Prosveta, Niš (in Serbian)
- Pticha pateka, 1996, Matom, Sofia (in Bulgarian)
- Lastovke, 1998, Ljubljana (in Slovenian)
- At the Tombstone, 2003, Red Moon Press, Winchester, VA (in English)
- Balcony, 2006, Red Moon Press, Winchester, VA (in English)
- Kosovo Peony, 2008, Red Moon Press, Winchester, VA (in English)
- Rustic, 2010, Red Moon Press, Winchester, VA (in English)
- Spontaneous Mind, 55 tanka poems from Boulder, Colorado, 2013, Kamesan Books, Charleston, SC, USA (In English and Japanese)
- San Francisco Haiku, 121 haiku by Dimitar Anakiev, 2015, Kamesan Books, Charleston, SC, USA (In English)
- Hiroshima Day, 21 Haiku by Dimitar Anakiev, 2015, Kamesan Books, Charleston, SC, USA (In English and Japanese)
- Xenophobic Mosquitoes, 21 haiku from an asylum center 2017, Kamesan Books, Charleston, SC, USA (In English, Chinese, Russian, German, Persian, Italian, Portuguese and Slovenian)

Literary awards

- European Award: Medal of Franz Kafka, 1999, Prague
- The Museum of Haiku Literature Award, 2000, Tokyo
- Haiku Society of America Annual Merit Book Award, 2003
- Shamrock Haiku Journal Readers' Choice Award, 2009, Dublin
- Ginyu Haiku Award 2013, 2013, Saitama, Japan
- Genyuan Haibun Contest: An Cottage Prize, Kyoto, 2017

Editor (periodicals)

- Haiku Novine, 1993–2018, Niš, Serbia
- Prijatelj 1996–98, Tolmin, Slovenia

Editor (books)

- Knots: An Anthology of Southeastern European Haiku, 1999, Prijatelj, Slovenia (co-edited with Jim Kacian, English)
- Pound of Silence, anthology of Slovenian haiku, 2005, Apokalipsa, Ljubljana
- Encyclopædia Britannica Yearbook editor of SouthEastern European Literature, 2000–2001
- Kamesan World Haiku Anthology on War, Violence and Human Rights Violation, 2013, Santa Cruz, CA, USA

E-novine Anakiev was also regular contributor of E-novine (E-news), regional news portal in Serbian-Croatian-Bosnian-Monenegrian.

== Interviews ==
Dimitar Anakiev interviewed by Špela Raspotnik ("Kings of the Road" No.6/2006):

Video interview with Dimitar Anakiev by Igor Mašera (Slovenian, 2008)

== Films online ==
- "Poslednji Žilnik / Last of the Žilniks"
- "Zradirani / Rubbed Out (2004)"
- "Moj ljubi geto"
- "Moj ljubi geto / My Dear Ghetto (2008)"
