= Ana Ilić =

Serbian poet, philosophy student (born 1995)

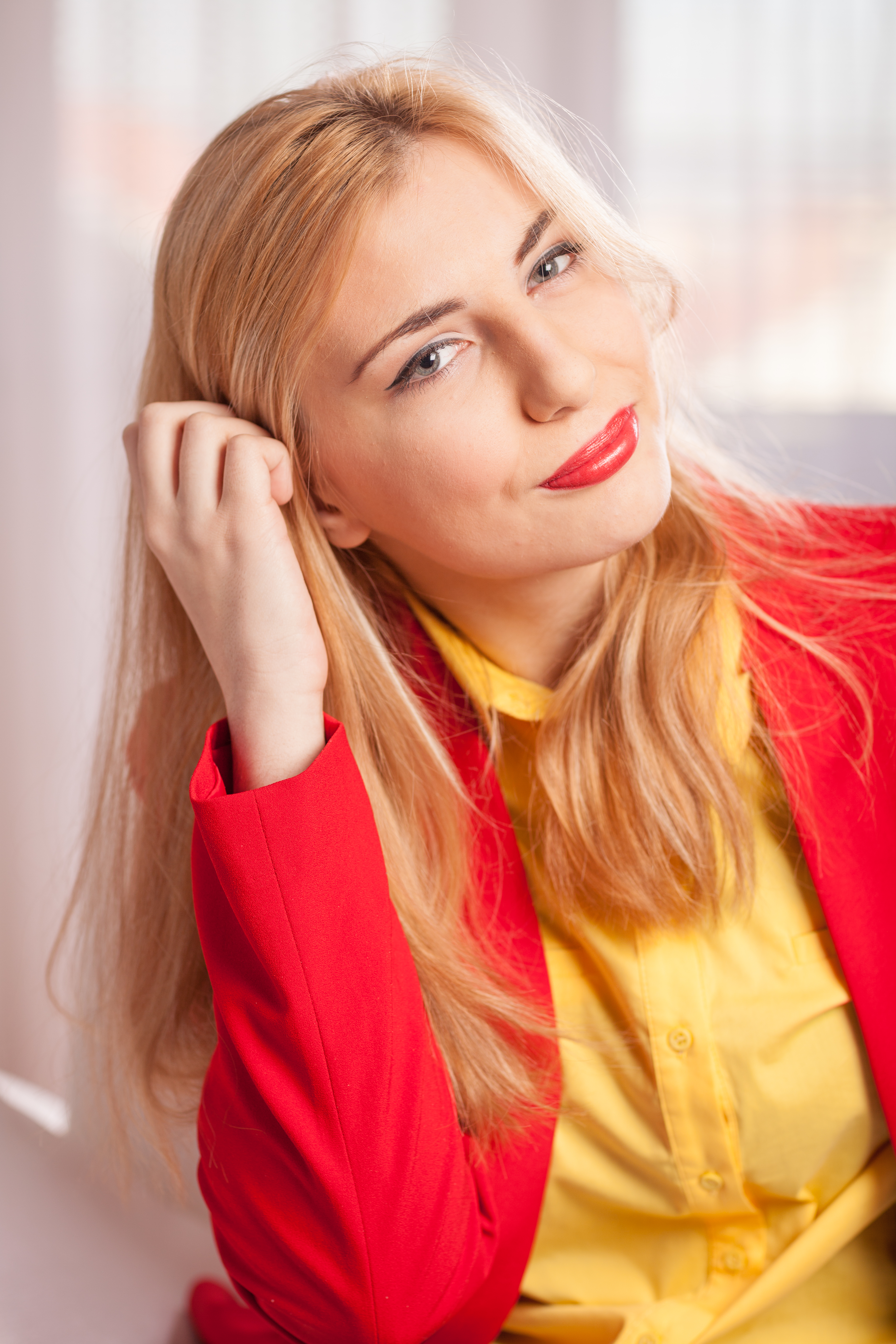
- Born: 25 December 1995 (age 30); Vranje, FR Yugoslavia
- Occupations: Poet, writer
- Writing career
- Period: 2011–
- Genre: Poetry

Ana Ilić (Serbian Cyrillic: Ана Илић; born 25 December 1995) is a Serbian poet and student of philosophy from Vladičin Han. She is one of the rare people in Serbia who suffers from Friedreich's ataxia.

By selling and promoting her poem collections, Ana is drawing public attention to people suffering from rare diseases as well as people with disabilities and collecting funds for much-needed medications for disease control.

== Biography ==
Ana Ilić was born on 25 December 1995 in Vranje. She finished primary and secondary education, despite her illness, in Vladičin Han and is now a student at the Faculty of Philosophy in Niš. Until the age of nine, she did not differ in any way from other children, but then she was diagnosed with Friedreich's ataxia at the Children's Neurology Center in Belgrade. It is a rare and serious incurable disease. In a short time, Ana became unable to walk and a series of serious secondary diagnoses followed the basic: serious cardiomyopathy, skeletal deformities, fatigue, muscular weakness, diabetes.

She presented her poetry collections from 2012 to date on promotions in Belgrade, Vladičin Han, Vranje (during the Week of Goodness and the Vranje Cultural Year), Los Angeles, Toronto, Niš, as well as at the October Diaspora Writers' Meetings in Frankfurt.

As part of the activities organized by the National Organization for Rare Diseases of Serbia in 2013, dedicated to the International Rare Disease Day, on 27 February, the Big scene of Atelje 212 Theater hosted aLiterary Evening with Ana Ilić. Her verses were recited by: Ivana Kuzmanović, writer, Ivana Dimić, playwright and director of Atelje 212 Theater at the time, as well as actors: Milan Caci Mihailović, Ivan Jevtović, Nenad Ćirić, Jakov Jevtović, Tanja Petrović and Vladislav Mihailović.

She is a member of the Society of Writers and Literary Translators of Niš.

== Poem collections ==
- Pod svetlom istine – (Under the Light of Truth), independent publication, 2011.
- One zvezdane oči – (Those Starry Eyes), independent publication, 2014.
- Utrnule reči – (Numb words), independent publication, 2018.

Ana's first poem collection Pod svetlom istine was created between her tenth and sixteenth year, and was published on her 16th birthday as a gift from a group of authors from the publishing house Laguna and as the beginning of the humanitarian action under the coordination and patronage of writer Ivana Kuzmanović. The collection was presented to the readers at the International Book Fair 2012 in Belgrade in 2013, and with the help of the Association of Writers Sedmica, Frankfurt at the largest book fair in the world in Frankfurt.

== Representation in anthologies and collections ==
- In the anthology The most beautiful love poems by Serbian female poets (99 Serbian poets through centuries ‒ from nun Jefimija to the youngest Ana Ilić)
- In the anthology of contemporary poets of the 21st century in the edition Poetry Thoughts: Dreams sprinkled with frost, published on the 120th anniversary of the birth of Sergei A. Yesenin,
- In the anthology of the literary works from Vladičin Han,
- In the jubilee edition of the influential magazine for literature, art and culture Gradina
- In the edition Iskra ljubavi (Spark of Love), with which the organization ″Dr Saša Božović″ marked the 100th anniversary of the birth of Dr. Saša Božović, war doctor, humanist and author of the novel "Tebi, moja Dolores" (To you, my Dolores)
- In the magazine for art and culture "Zvezdani kolodvor" (Starry Station)
- In the Independent Journal of Literary History and Future in Bosnia and Herzegovina "Naslijeđe" (Heritage) and international collections: "Između dva sveta (Between Two Worlds), "Poetsko ćoše" (Poetic corner), "Osmeh život krasi (A smile adorns life), "More na dlanu (Sea on the palm" (Croatia), "Osvetljavanje (Lighting).

Ana's story Sakupljanje ljubavi (Collecting Love) was published in the fifth book Ne ostavljaj me (Don't Leave Me) of the bestseller series O psima i ljudima (About Dogs and People) by Professor Dr. Ratko Božović and Marijana Rajić.

== Translated poems ==
- Nine poems, translated into English, were published in the oldest Serbian newspaper in the US "American Srbobran", which was founded in Pittsburgh in 1905, where it is still published once a week. The poems were translated by Mira Matarić, Doctor of Linguistics and World Literature.
- Ana's poems were translated into Polish and along with her biography, published on the site: "Poetry, Poetry" which introduces artists from countries that constituted former Eastern Europe.

== Prizes and awards ==
- Award at the literary competition Reč u boji (Word in color) organized by the Youth Office Vranje,
- Winner of the First Annual Award of the National Organization for Rare Diseases of Serbia for contributing to spreading awareness of rare diseases,
- Winner of the Svetosavski Award (2013) and the Prize of Prince Lazar (2014) ‒ for the promotion of cultural creativity in the municipality of Vladičin Han,
- Holder of "Vuk's diploma" for the school year 2013/14. in High School "Jovan Skerlić",
- From April 2015, a newly founded literary club in Vladičin Han is named after the young poet ‒ "Ana Ilić Literary Club".
