= Yugoslav Art Exhibitions =

Yugoslav Art Exhibitions (Serbo-Croatian: Jugoslovenske umetničke izložbe) were a series of South Slavic art exhibitions held in the early 20th century and during the interwar period. Six exhibitions were held in total, with the first one held in Belgrade in 1904, followed by Sofia in 1906, Zagreb in 1908, Belgrade in 1912, Belgrade in 1922 and Novi Sad in 1927.

The first exhibition was held in 1904 on the occasion of the 100th anniversary of the beginning of the Serbian Revolution and coronation of the king Peter I of Serbia who wanted to improve his country's international standing after the May Coup. 17 prominent individuals from the Great School (University of Belgrade) were members of the first exhibition's board including Marko Leko, Jovan Cvijić, Mihailo Valtrović, Simo Matavulj, Steva Todorović, Đorđe Jovanović and Miloje Vasić. The first exhibition collected about 500 works from Vlaho Bukovac, Ivan Meštrović, Robert Auer, Branimir Šenoa, Josif Bauer, Robert Frangeš, Anton Ažbe, Paja Jovanović, Uroš Predić, Đorđe Jovanović, Nadežda Petrović, Beta Vukanović, Rista Vukanović, Marko Murat, Ivan Mrkvička and other artists from the region.

The second Yugoslav exhibition in Sofia was marked by disagreement between the proponents of the integral Yugoslavism and proponents of preservation of specific category for each South Slavic nation as it was held in Belgrade in 1904. The third exhibition in Zagreb showed intense cultural proximity between Serbian and Croatian artists which was closer than their proximity to other South Slavic national cultures. While the fourth exhibition was originally planned to be hečd in Ljubljana, the Annexation Crisis forced the organizers to move it to Belgrade once again.

== See also ==
- Art of Yugoslavia
