= Massuka Živojinović =

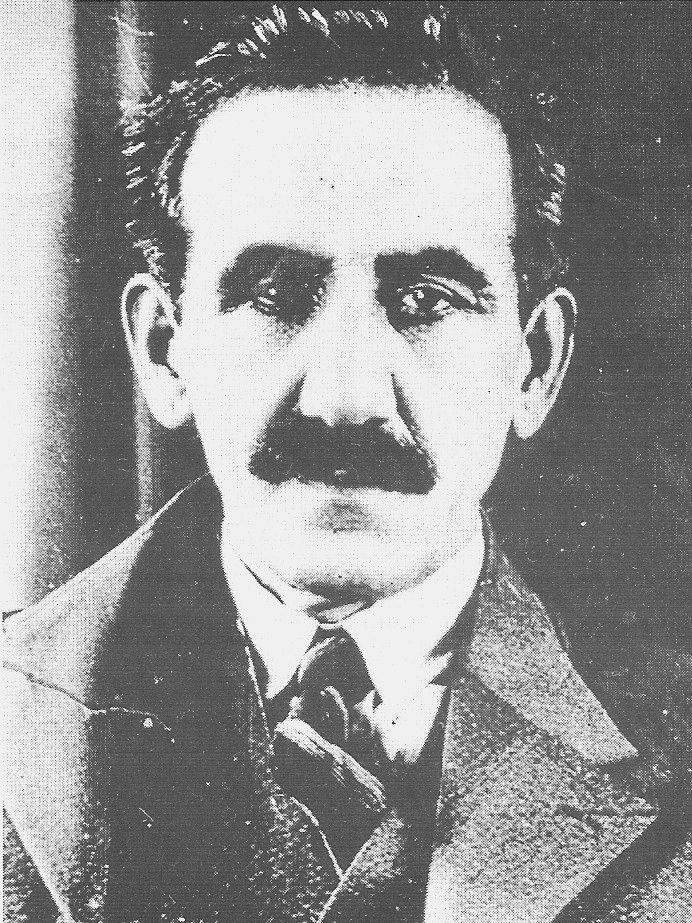
- Born: 1886.
- Died: 1974.

Velimir Živojinović Massuka (1886–1974) — also sometimes written as Masuka (Serbian Cyrillic: Масука), in a wrong transliteration from Serbian Cyrillic, as he used Massuka in Latin alphabet alongside his name in Cyrillic, namely "Велимир Живојиновић Massuka" — was a Serbian poet, playwright, literary critic, and translator. Most of his activities were devoted to the theater. He was active as a theater director in Belgrade, Skopje, and Niš.

== Biography ==
He was born in Velika Plana, lost his mother at the age of one and his father when he was ten. He read German at the University of Belgrade and Leipzig University and finished his studies in 1914. During the First World War he was in the Serbian army and caught pneumonia in San Giovanni in 1916, was captured in Ulcinj and transferred to camp Boldogasszony (today Frauenkirchen, Austria) until 1918.

After the war he worked as a teacher in Belgrade. From 11 November 1924 to 21 August 1925 he was the director of the National Theatre in Belgrade. From 1925 until 1934 he translated various works from English and German, including William Shakespeare's The Winter's Tale and Romeo and Juliet. After the end of World War I, he married Danica Radmilović (born in 1893), a French teacher. Their son Branimir Živojinović (1930–2007) was also a poet and German literature scholar.

He was also the first president of the Society of Writers and Literary Translators of Niš, contributing to the establishment of its early organizational structure and activities.
