= Art of Yugoslavia =

The art of Yugoslavia is the visual art created by a number of painters, sculptors and graphics artists in Yugoslavia.

== Origins ==
Visual arts in the territories that later became Yugoslavia were primarily limited to religious arts until the 19th century. At that time Yugoslav art was still attached to baroque tradition and, along with romanticism in Yugoslav literature, secular motives were establishing very slowly. First romantic, Biedermeier and classicist painters were all schooled abroad and painted mostly portraits. At the turn to 20th century with the influence from western metropoles secession came to Slovenia and Croatia. Vlaho Bukovac organized a painters society in Zagreb with many exhibitions, while in Belgrade Kirilo Kutlik set up the first school of art in 1895. Secession artists Hinko Smrekar and Maksim Gaspari produced mostly graphics, while Ivan Meštrović became known as a sculptor. A series of six Yugoslav Art Exhibitions were organized between 1904 and 1927, displaying works from many prominent individuals from the region.

== Kingdom of Yugoslavia ==
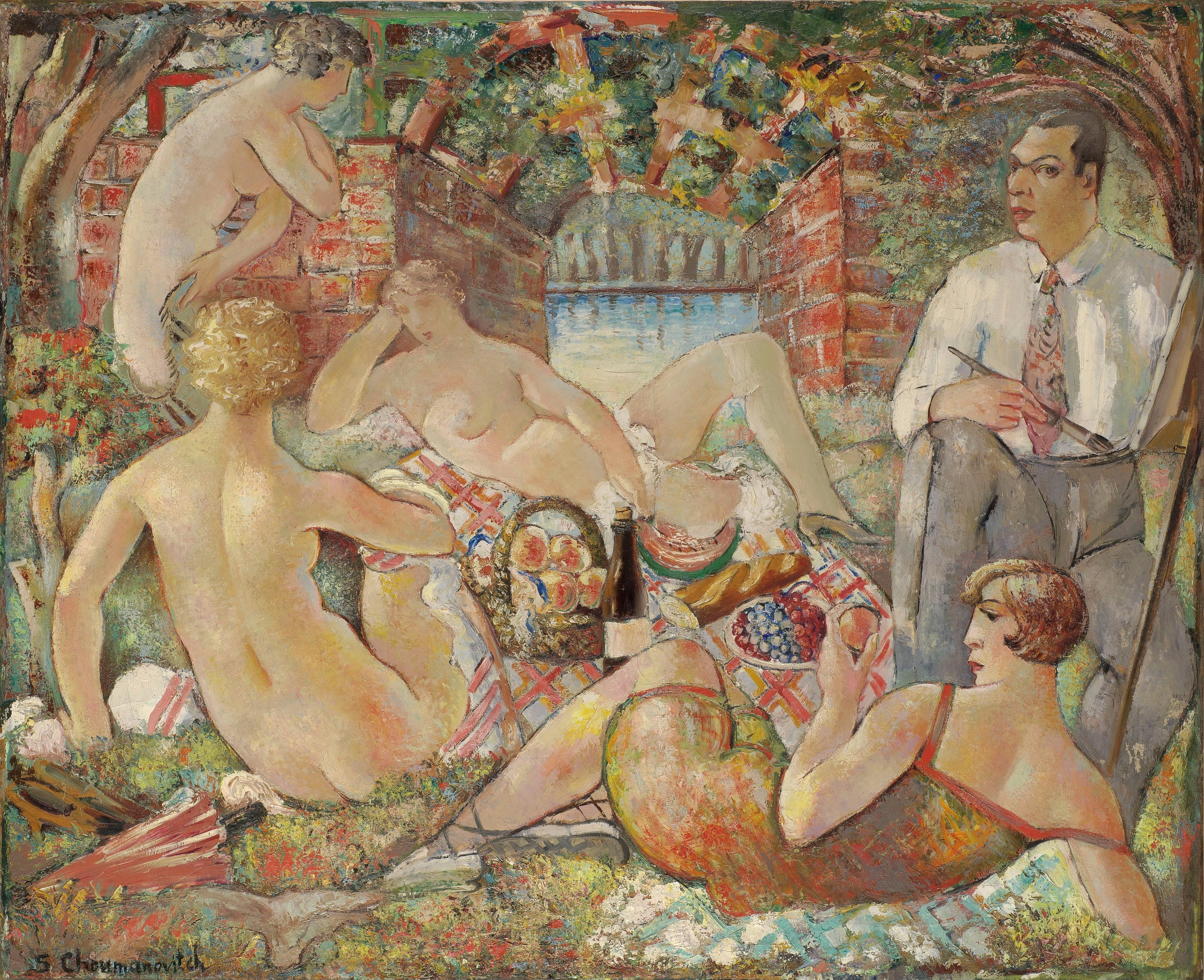
Luncheon on grass by Sava Šumanović, 1927

With the formation of Kingdom of Serbs, Croats and Slovenes Avantgarde took primacy in Yugoslav arts. Modern currents of expressionism, cubism and surrealism emerged with new young artists like Petar Dobrović, Jovan Bijelić, Milo Milunović, Sava Šumanović, Stane Kregar and Gojmir Anton Kos. Later, with the political crisis in the 1930s, social themes emerged with critical attitude to old forms. Mirko Kujačić wrote a A Manifesto of Zenitism, while Krsto Hegedušić founded a radical group Zemlja in Zagreb. In Trieste, constructivism was strong with the Slovenian painter Avgust Černigoj leading the style. Institutionally, Yugoslav art was supported by the new Academy of Fine Arts at the University of Zagreb and Belgrade School of Painting. Sculpturing was not as developed as painting and it stayed mostly under the old influence of Ivan Meštrović. Other notable sculptor of this era was Antun Augustinčić.

== Socialist Federative Republic of Yugoslavia ==
Little art was produced during World War II in Yugoslavia, with mostly partisan graphics being preserved.

After the war, old styles and techniques persisted until esthetic utilitarism and socialist realism were introduced with the new socialist system. While lasting for only a couple of years notable socialist realist artwork and sculptures include Boža Ilić's "Exploratory drilling in New Belgrade", Antun Augustinčić's Batina memorial (1945–1957) and the monument to the fallen soldiers at Iriški Venac by Sreten Stojanović in 1951. At the 1952 Ljubljana Congress of the Association of Writers of Yugoslavia, Miroslav Krleža criticized Soviet realism in painting which he denounced as a revival of bourgeois academic forms.

In the 1950s, new avantgarde and fantastic elements emerged once again with the esthetics of shock. Socialist Yugoslavia was an important exception among the communist countries, because after the Tito–Stalin split in 1948, it abandoned socialist realism along with other elements previously imported from the Soviet system and allowed greater artistic freedom. Following the rejection of the Soviet inspired dominance of socialist realism Yugoslav artists enjoyed relatively high levels of artistic autonomy short of freedom to produce anti-Tito art while at the same time enjoying significant levels of state support. There was no single dominate style with many new institutions and societies being formed in Ljubljana, Zagreb, Belgrade and other large cities. Tolerance or the outright official support for the abstract art, local Bauhaus traditions and Russian constructivism was used for political representation by the regime nurturing an image of Yugoslavia as a modern and independent country.

A phenomenon, also recognized abroad, was the self-taught school in Hlebine with Ivan Generalić.

On the other side, academic approach became prevalent, forming many courses and experimenting with geometry, magic, colors, photographic realism and other elements. The most famous groups were New tendency from Zagreb, Group 69 from Ljubljana and December from Belgrade. Famous artists of this period include Miodrag B. Protić, Branko Miljuš, Miljenko Stančić, Vladimir Veličković, Vjenceslav Richter, Ivan Picelj, Miroslav Šutej, Janez Bernik, Jože Ciuha and Adriana Maraž. In 1955 Belgrade based Cvijeta Zuzorić Art Pavilion hosted the highly anticipated exhibition of Henry Moore. New tendencies, diverse movement deeply intertwined with western European art, opened its first exhibition in Zagreb on 3 August 1961 with the event and subsequent exhibitions until 1973 emphasising the role of new technologies and video art, bio-art and robotics while providing particular local twist on the issues of social role of art against l'art pour l'art tendencies in the west.

Along with painting there was also a huge flourishing of graphics, while sculpture in SFR Yugoslavia was less diversiform and mostly soc-realist, resembling Yugoslav architecture.

== See also ==
- Architecture of Yugoslavia
- Yugoslav World War II monuments and memorials
- Signalism
- Croatian art of the 20th century
- Gallery of the Non-Aligned Countries "Josip Broz Tito"
