= Eyot (band) =

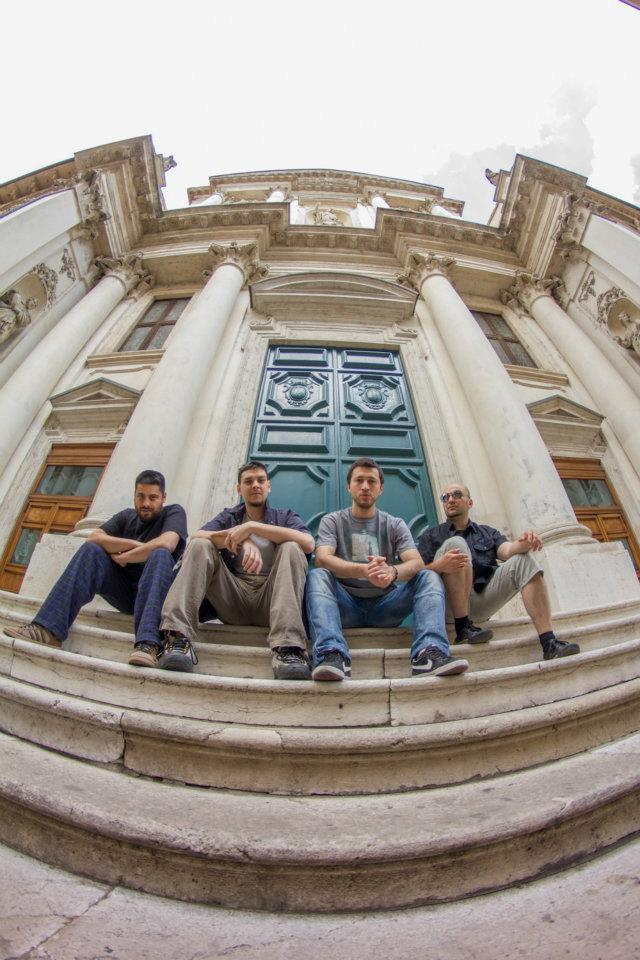
- EYOT - Vicenza 2012

Background information
- Origin: Niš, Serbia
- Genre: Jazz
- Years active: 2008 – present
- Label: Ropeadope Records
- Members: Dejan Ilijić; Slađan Milenović; Miloš Vojvodić; Marko Stojiljković
- Website: eyotmusic.net

Eyot is a jazz fusion band from Niš, Serbia that formed in 2008. The group won the MIDEM OFF Competition in 2012.

== Style ==
Their music style is a blend of jazz, classical piano, East European folk music, and smooth electronic fusion.

== Members ==
- Dejan Ilijić – piano
- Slađan Milenović – guitar
- Miloš Vojvodić – drums
- Marko Stojiljković – bass

== Discography ==
- Horizon (2010)
- Drifters (2013)
- Similarity (2014)
- Innate (2017)
- 557799 (2020)
