= Miljenko Stančić =

Croatian painter and graphic artist

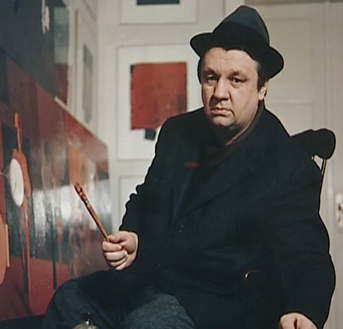
Miljenko Stančić

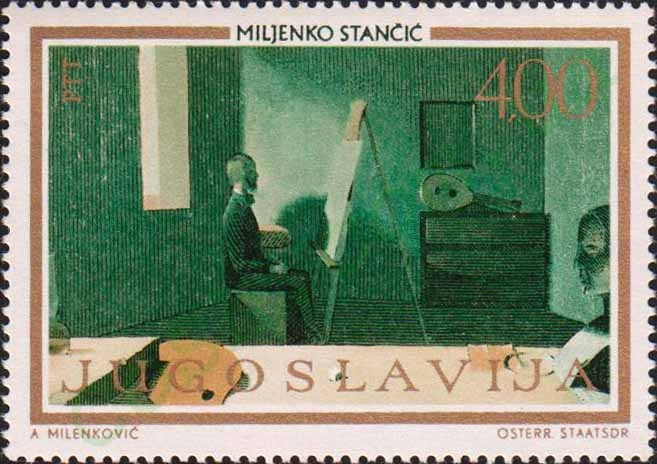
Painting by Stančić on a 1973 Yugoslav stamp

Miljenko Stančić (1 March 1926 – 13 May 1977) was a Croatian painter and graphic artist born in Varaždin. He is famous for his vast painting oeuvre of Varaždin cityscapes.

Along with Ljubo Ivančić, Ivan Kožarić, Valerije Michieli and Josip Vaništa, he was a member of the Grupe Petorice (Group of Five) which was active in the 1950s in Zagreb. Besides painting, he also did illustrations for newspapers, books and magazines, as well as scenography (he was a scenographer for In Agony, a play by Miroslav Krleža, 1959). He was an assistant professor at the Academy of Fine Arts, University of Zagreb (1961), and was appointed full professor in 1970 (where he worked until 1977). Three documentaries about Stančić have been made to date: Miljenko Stančić (directed by Ante Viculin, TV Zagreb, 1960), Figures of Children in Miljenko Stančić’s Paintings (directed by Eduard Galić, TV Zagreb, 1963) and Miljenko Stančić (directed by Mira Wolf, TV Zagreb, 1987).

He exhibited at many shows in Croatia and abroad, including: Group of Five, Museum of Arts and Crafts (Zagreb, 1955), Modern Yugoslav Painting (Edinburgh, Coventry, Manchester, Leicester, 1957), 60 Years of Croatian Painting and Sculpture, Art Pavilion (Zagreb, 1961), Studio 65, Galerie (Bruxelles, 1967), Museum of Arts and Crafts, (Zagreb, solo exhibition, 1971), Croatian Cityscape Painters from Bukovac to the Present Day, Art Gallery (Dubrovnik, 1981). Several retrospective exhibitions of Stančić's work have been organized to date at the Museum of Contemporary Art (Belgrade, 1966), HAZU – Croatian Academy of Sciences and Arts (Zagreb, 1970), and in the Town Museum of Varaždin, Miljenko Stančić – Retrospective Exhibition: Paintings, Drawings, Graphics 1942–1977,(1996) and Hommage – Miljenko Stančić 1977–2007, (2007–2008).

He received many awards for his work, including the City of Zagreb Award (1959), the Award for Painting at the 2nd Fine Arts Triennial, (Belgrade, 1964), and the annual Vladimir Nazor Award (1971).

The Miljenko Stančić Collection belongs to the Town Museum in Varaždin, Croatia.

== Published works on Miljenko Stančić ==
- Zidić, Igor – Miljenko Stančić, (Matica hrvatska, Zagreb, 1979).
- Maroević, Tonko, Krleža, Miroslav & Waldberg, Patrick – Miljenko Stančić, (Maritimo design and the City of Varaždin, 2008).
