= Branimir Živojinović =

Branimir Živojinović (Belgrade, 10 June 1930 – Belgrade, 20 August 2007) was a Serbian poet and translator.

== Biography ==
His parents were Velimir Živojinović Masuka, a theatre director, and Danica (née Radmilović), a French teacher. Živojinović studied philosophy at the University of Belgrade, graduated in 1957, and later also taught there. He translated various literary works from German to Serbian, including Goethe's Faust and poems by Rainer Maria Rilke.

== Bibliography ==
- Dopiranje, Nolit, Belgrade 1972
- Označavanja, Matica Srpska, Novi Sad 1972
