= Cultural Center of Niš =

Cultural Center of Niš or NKC (Serbian Cyrillic: Нишки културни центар or НКЦ) is a cultural institution in Palilula in Niš, which organizes public performances of creators and artists, and festivals, literary events, concert performances, exhibitions, lectures, film screenings, holiday celebrations and anniversaries, publishing books and magazine editing the work of galleries and amateur sections, related not only to the city of Niš, but also in whole Serbia south of Belgrade. The current director of "NKC" is a master of historical sciences Bojana Simović.
