= Kulina, Aleksinac =

Kulina Кулина
- Village
- Location within Serbia
- Coordinates: 43°25′N 21°36′E
- Country: Serbia
- District: Nišava
- Municipality: Aleksinac

Population (2002)
  - Total: 731
- Time zone: UTC+1 (CET)
  - Summer (DST): UTC+2 (CEST)

Kulin (Serbian Cyrillic: Кулин) is a village in the municipality of Aleksinac, Serbia. According to the census of 2002, there were 731 people living in the village. In the census of 1991, there were 764 inhabitants. The village has 81 households, and the average number of persons per household is 2.69.
