= Milivoje Pavlović =

- Born: 1947 (age 78–79); Medveđa, PR Serbia, FPR Yugoslavia
- Education: Faculty of Philology in Belgrade
- Occupations: writer; journalist; literature, culture and media scholar

Milivoje Pavlović (Serbian Cyrillic: Миливоје Павловић; Medveđa, 1947) is an awarded Serbian writer and university professor, as well as literature, culture and media scholar.

== Biography ==
He studied Serbian language and Yugoslav literature at the Faculty of Philology in Belgrade. He has MA and PhD in Literature Studies.

From 1987 to 1991 he was the director of Serbian Cultural and Educational Community (Kulturno-prosvetna zajednica Srbije). From 1991 to 1994 he was elected twice for the Republic Information Minister. From the end of 1994 to February 2001 he was the director of Radio Belgrade. From 1998 worked as a university lecturer – first at the Art Academy in Belgrade, and afterwards on the Faculty of Business Studies and the Faculty of Culture and Media. Currently he is a professor and the Dean of the Faculty of Culture and Media and the Pro-rector of the University "Megatrend" in Belgrade.

His works are in national and foreign literary and multimedia anthologies. He edited a book on the radio medium The Epoch's Ear on Duty (2000), and books by Аleksandr Solzhenitsyn and Miroljub Todorović, as well as a number of collection of works on Signalism, international neo-avant-garde movement originated in Serbia in the late 1960s.

He is a member of the Journalists' Association of Serbia and the Association of Writers of Serbia.

== Bibliography ==
Monographs

- Bela knjiga (The White Book, 1974)
- Kultura od do (The Culture From To, 1980)
- Kulturni frontovi i pozadina (The Culture Fronts and Background, 1984)
- Knjiga o himni (The Book on Anthem, 1984, 1986, 1990)
- Svet u signalima (The World in Signals, 1996)
- Himna – sto pitanja i sto odgovora (The Anthem – One Hundred Questions and Answers, 1998)
- Ključevi signalističke poetike (The Keys of Signalistic Poetics, 1999)
- Avangarda, neoavangarda i signalizam (The Avant-garde, Neo-Avant-garde and Signalism, 2002)
- Srpske zemlje i dijaspora licem prema Hilandaru (Serbian Countries and Diaspora Facing Chilandar, 2003)
- Srpska znamenja (Serbian Insignia, 2007)
- Ogledalo Dobrice Ćosića (Dobrica Ćosić's Mirror, 2014)
- Venac od trnja za Danila Kiša (A Wreath of Thorns for Danilo Kiš, 2016, 2017)
- Pisma s dvostrukim dnom (Double-Sided Letters, 2018)

Text books

- Odnosi s javnošću (Public Relations)
- Poslovna korespondencija Business correspondence)
- Oglašavanje u medijima (Advertising in the media)

== Awards and recognitions ==
- Annual award of the Journalists' Association of Serbia (1980, 2003; Godišnja nagrada Udruženja novinara Srbije)
- International Book Fair in Belgrade: "Publishing venture of the year" for The Book on the Anthem (1986; Izdavački poduhvat godine za "Knjigu o himni" na Međunarodnom sajmu knjiga u Beogradu),
- Golden Ring of Beograde (1989; Zlatni beočug Beograda),
- Vuk's award (1999; Vukova nagrada),
- Charter of Saint Sava (2006; Svetosavska povelja),
- International regional award "Alpe-Adria" for contribution to promoting the culture of communication (2011; Međunarodna nagrada regiona „Alpe-Adrija“ za razvoj odnosa s javnošću),
- Taboo magazine Award for the development of business publicity and public relations (2012; Nagrada časopisa Tabu za unapređenje PR),
- “Ivo Andrić" Academy Award for Dobrica Ćosić's Mirror (2015; Nagrada Akademije "Ivo Andrić" za Ogledalo Dobrice Ćosića)
- "Teodor Pavlović" Award for the contribution in information development in Serbia and Diaspora (Hungary, 2017; Nagrada "Teodor Pavlović" za doprinos unapređenju informisanja u Srbiji i rasejanju, Mađarska, 2017)
- Belgrade Book Fair: "Publishing venture of the year" award for the book on Danilo Kiš (2016; Nagrada za izdavački poduhvat za knjigu o Danilu Kišu na Sajmu knjiga u Beogradu)
- Vuk's Foundation Art Award (2018)
- "Matija Ban" Award (2019)
