= Klaus Groh =

German weightlifter

Personal information
- Nationality: German
- Born: 30 August 1954 (age 70); Pirmasens, Germany

Sport
- Sport: Weightlifting

Klaus Groh (born 30 August 1954) is a German weightlifter. He competed in the men's middleweight event at the 1976 Summer Olympics.
