= Guillermo Deisler =

Guillermo Deisler (15 June 1940–21 October 1995) was a stage designer, visual poet and mail artist. In his country of birth, Chile, as well as during his long and difficult exile (since 1986 in the German Democratic Republic) his rich and imaginative work constituted the centre of his life.

== Life ==
Deisler was born in Santiago, Chile as the son of a family that had immigrated around 1900 from Prussia. He studied art and became, in 1967, a teacher of graphic art at the University of Chile in Antofagasta. When Pinochet came to power, he (like many of his colleagues) was arrested and sacked. With the help of friends, he was able to leave prison and go into exile in Europe. After staying in France for a year, he volunteered to work in the German Democratic Republic. From there, however, he was sent on to Bulgaria, where he and his family stayed for almost 12 years. In 1986, he was allowed to return to the German Democratic Republic, where he worked as a stage designer at the provincial theatre in Halle (Saale) until his untimely death.

== Work ==
Deisler has produced a large body of visual poetry and contributed to the movement of mail art. But most of this work, exhibited and published in the different countries of his exile, is little known and remains to be rediscovered. He is largely remembered as a promoter of his fellow artists. As early as 1963 to 1973 he published mimbre (willow rod), a periodical of graphic arts and visual poetry, presenting the avantgarde of Latin American artists. In 1987, he started a similar project, this time of an international scope: the Peacedream project UNI/vers(;), publishing original mail art works from artists like Hans Braumüller, Theo Breuer, David Chikladze (Georgia), Pedro-Juan Gutierrez (Cuba), Joseph Huber (Germany), César Figueiredo (Portugal), K. Takeishi-Tateno (Japan), Spencer Selby (USA) and many others. In 1990, just after the unification of Germany, he edited (together with the designer Jörg Kowalski) the anthology wortBILD (wordPICTURE), documenting avant-garde visual poetry in the now defunct German Democratic Republic.

Today his collection of more than 5,000 works of mail art is preserved in the archives of the Academy of the Arts, Berlin.

== Selected exhibitions ==
- 1964 Galeria Vanguadia, Santiago de Chile
- 1967 Galeria Kraft, Buenos Aires, Argentina
- 1970 Casa de Cultura, Ministerio de Educación, Santiago de Chile
- 1971 Galeria U, Montevideo, Uruguay
- 1979 Gráficas, Viejo Plovdiv, Bulgaria
- 1983 Sociedad de Escritores de Chile, Santiago de Chile
- 1987 Galerie des Kulturbundes, Hainichen, Alemania
- 1990 Galerie Gallus, Frankfurt/Oder, Alemania
- 1991 Galerie Sophienstrasse, Berlin
- 1991 Marché de la Poesie, Paris, France
- 1992 Museum für Kunsthandwerk, Frankfurt/Main, Alemania
- 1993 Kunsthalle, Kühlungsborn, Alemania
- 1994 Kunsttrienale, Frankfurt/Main, Alemania
- 1996 Sala Juan Egenau, Universidad de Chile, Santiago de Chile
- 1997 Centre Internationale de Poesie, Marseille, Francia
- 1999 Museo Kitami, Japon
- 2002 Casa Cultura Mexicana, Viejo Plovdiv, Bulgaria
- 2004 Galeria Stelzer und zaglmeier, Halle, Alemania
- 2006 Sala Extensión Cultural, Universidad de Talca, Chile.
- 2007 Sala Puntángeles, Universidad de Playa Ancha, Valparaíso, Chile. "Exclusivo hecho para usted" curatoría de Francisca García B.
- 2008 Sala Juan Egenau, Universidad de Chile, Santiago de Chile. "Poetry Factory" curatoría Francisca García B. y gestión de Verónica Troncoso
