= Čukljenik =

Čukljenik may refer to:

- Čukljenik (Niška Banja), a village in Serbia
- Čukljenik (Leskovac), a village in Serbia
