= Kutina (disambiguation) =

Kutina is a city in central Croatia. It may also refer to

- Kutina, Ravno, a village in Bosnia and Herzegovina
- Marina Kutina, a village in Serbia
- Prva Kutina, a village in Serbia
- Kuteena or Kutina, a village in India
- Kutina (volcano) in Kamchatka, Russia, best known as Spokoyny
- Joe Kutina (1885–1945), American baseball player
