= Kutyna =

Kutyna is a surname. Notable people with the surname include:

- Marty Kutyna (born 1932), American baseball player
- Donald Kutyna (born 1933), United States Air Force general

== See also ==
- Kutina (disambiguation)
