= Flag of Niš =

Niš
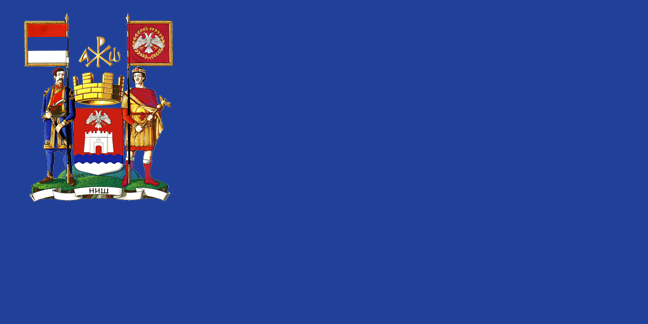
- Use: National flag
- Proportion: 1:2 (officially) or 2:3
- Adopted: 1996
- Design: Coat of arms of Niš in the upper left corner on a dark blue background
- Designed by: Dragomir Acović

The flag of Niš is a rectangular flag consisting of a dark blue field with the coat of arms of Niš in the upper left corner. The flag has an official proportion of 1:2, but 2:3 is also used. The coat of arms should take up 1/6 of the flag's area. It's used together with the flag of Serbia. It was adopted in 1996. The design of the flag was confirmed on 6 June 2002, in article 9 of the City of Niš statute.

== Other flags ==
Flag of Niš Municipality
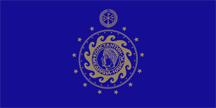
- Use: National flag
- Proportion: 1:2
- Adopted: 2002
- Relinquished: 2005
- Design: Blue background and municipality seal at the centre

Until 2005 city of Niš consisted of two municipalities, Niš and Niška Banja. Municipality of Niš had its own flag, a rectangular 2:1 flag with blue background, and municipality seal at the centre.
