= Ravni Do =

- Village
- Location within Serbia
- Coordinates: 43°17′27″N 22°08′43″E
- Country: Serbia
- District: Nišava District
- Municipality: Niška Banja
- Time zone: UTC+1 (CET)
  - Summer (DST): UTC+2 (CEST)

Ravni Do is a village situated in Niška Banja municipality in Serbia.
