= Bancarevo =

Bancarevo Банцарево
- Village
- Location within Serbia
- Coordinates: 43.2717°N 22.1133°E
- Country: Serbia
- Region: Southern and Eastern Serbia
- District: Nišava
- Municipality: Niška Banja

Area
  - Total: 6.98 km^{2} (2.69 sq mi)
- Elevation: 567 m (1,860 ft)

Population (2011)
  - Total: 66
  - Density: 9.5/km^{2} (24/sq mi)
- Time zone: UTC+1 (CET)
  - Summer (DST): UTC+2 (CEST)

Bancarevo (Serbian Cyrillic: Банцарево) is a village situated in Niška Banja municipality in Serbia.
