= Vojislav V. Jovanović =

Serbian modernist writer of prose and poems

- Born: Vojislav V. Jovanović; 28 June 1940; Niška Banja, Niš, Kingdom of Yugoslavia
- Died: 5 March 2018 (aged 77); Belgrade, Republic of Serbia
- Occupations: writer, poet, novelist

Vojislav V. Jovanović (28 June 1940 – 5 March 2018) was a Serbian novelist and writer of short stories, prose, and poems.

== Biography ==
Vojislav V. Jovanović was born in Niška Banja, Niš, Serbia (then part of the Kingdom of Yugoslavia). He published 28 books of novels, prose and poetry. His works are included in various Serbian literature anthologies and have been translated into English, French, Dutch, Romanian and Catalan. Jovanović also published numerous articles in literary journals and magazines including Književne novine, Književna reč, Književni list, Književni magazin, Reč, Politika, Priča, Beogradski književni časopis, Gradina, Gradac (as a translator), Poezija, Letopis Matice srpske, Raška, Slava among others.

From 1984 to 2000, Jovanović served as a member of the editorial board of Književne novine. He did not receive major literary awards during his lifetime. He died in Belgrade on 5 March 2018.

== Works ==
- Dajmonion I, novel, Prosveta, Belgrade, COBISS.SR-ID 109184775, 1971
- Samoubistvo, short stories, M. Josić, Belgrade, V. V. Jovanović, Belgrade, Biblioteka G. 1, 1981
- Smrtovnica, poetry, Radiša Timotič, Belgrade, COBISS.SR-ID 13186055, 1984
- Teskoba, poetry, Grafos, Beograd, ISBN 86-7157-008-8, 1986
- Sion, novel, Beogradski izdavačko-grafički zavod, Belgrade, ISBN 86-13-00096-5, COBISS 43420167, 1987
- Dvoglava kornjača, short stories, Filip Višnjić, Belgrade, ISBN 86-7363-176-9, 1996
- Sionski soneti, poetry, Društvo Istočnik, Belgrade, COBISS.SR-ID 139449095, 1997/98
- Mrtva priroda, poetry, Umetničko društvo Gradac, Čačak/Belgrade, COBISS.SR-ID 1024007607, 1998
- Pesme za mrtvu, poetry, Umetničko društvo Gradac, Čačak/Belgrade, ISBN 86-83507-06-8, 2001
- Crv u rani, poetry, Društvo Istočnik, Belgarde, ISBN 86-84351-00-2, 2003
- Groblja, poetry, Gradac, Čačak/Belgrade, ISBN 86-83507-24-6, 2003
- Sedam pesama, poetry, Društvo Istočnik, Belgrade, ISBN 86-84351-05-3, 2005
- Poreklo crva, poetry, Društvo Istočnik, Belgrade, ISBN 86-84351-08-8, ISBN 978-86-84351-08-3, 2006
- Stanični bife, short stories, Gradac, Čačak/Belgrade, ISBN 86-83507-43-2, 2006
- Istinite priče o čoveku zvanom Veliki Mao, short stories, Gradac, Čačak/Belgrade, ISBN 86-83507-46-7, ISBN 978-86-83507-46-7, 2006
- Bolest bogova, long poem, Matična Biblioteka "Svetozar marković", Zaječar, ISBN 978-86-86305-05-3, 2007
- Priča za Roberta Valzera, short stories, Medijska knjižara Krug, Belgrade, ISBN 978-86-83507-54-2, 2007
- Sokrat, krčmar i krčmarev sin, prose, Gradac, Čačak, ISBN 978-86-83507-65-8, 2009
- Pesnička grba, poetry, Društvo Istočnik, Belgrade, ISBN 978-86-84351-10-6, 2009
- Metak u leđa, short stories, Gradac. Čačak/Belgrade, ISBN 978-86-83507-68-9, 2010
- Neljudske priče, short stories, Gradac, Čačak, ISBN 978-86-8350-77-88, 2011
- Sokratova smrt / Epimenid, prose, Biblioteka "Lađa" Gradac K, Čačak, ISBN 978-86-83507-84-9, 2012
- Jutarnji grob, poetry, Društvo Istočnik, Belgrade, ISBN 978-86-84351-19-9, 2012
- Mrtav, poetry, Biblioteka "Lađa" Gradac K, Čačak, ISBN 978-86-83507-93-1, 2013
- Smrt jednorukog čoveka, short stories, Biblioteka "Lađa" Gradac K, Čačak, ISBN 978-86-83507-99-3, 2014
- Bolest i njen vlasnik, poetry, Društvo Istočnik, Belgrade, ISBN 978-86-84351-24-3, 2014
- Venezia, Riva degli Schiavoni, poetry and prose, Biblioteka "Lađa" Gradac K, Čačak, ISBN 978-86-89901-16-0, 2016
- Mrtve reči, poetry, Biblioteka "Lađa" Gradac K, Čačak, ISBN 978-86-89901-25-2, 2017

== Sources ==
- National Library of Serbia
- Cultural Centre of Belgrade
