= Rautovo =

Rautovo Раутово
- Village
- Location within Serbia
- Coordinates: 43°16′40″N 22°02′28″E
- Country: Serbia
- Region: Southern and Eastern Serbia
- District: Nišava
- Municipality: Niška Banja
- Elevation: 1,870 ft (570 m)

Population
  - Total: 12
- Time zone: UTC+1 (CET)
  - Summer (DST): UTC+2 (CEST)

Rautovo is a village situated in Niška Banja municipality in Serbia.

It has an estimated population of 12 people.

It sits at 570 m (1,870 ft) above sea level.
