= Radikina Bara =

- Village
- Location within Serbia
- Coordinates: 43°16′24″N 22°03′00″E
- Country: Serbia
- District: Nišava District
- Municipality: Niška Banja
- Time zone: UTC+1 (CET)
  - Summer (DST): UTC+2 (CEST)

Radikina Bara is a village situated in Niška Banja municipality in Serbia.
