= Jelašnica, Niška Banja =

Jelašnica Јелашница
- Village
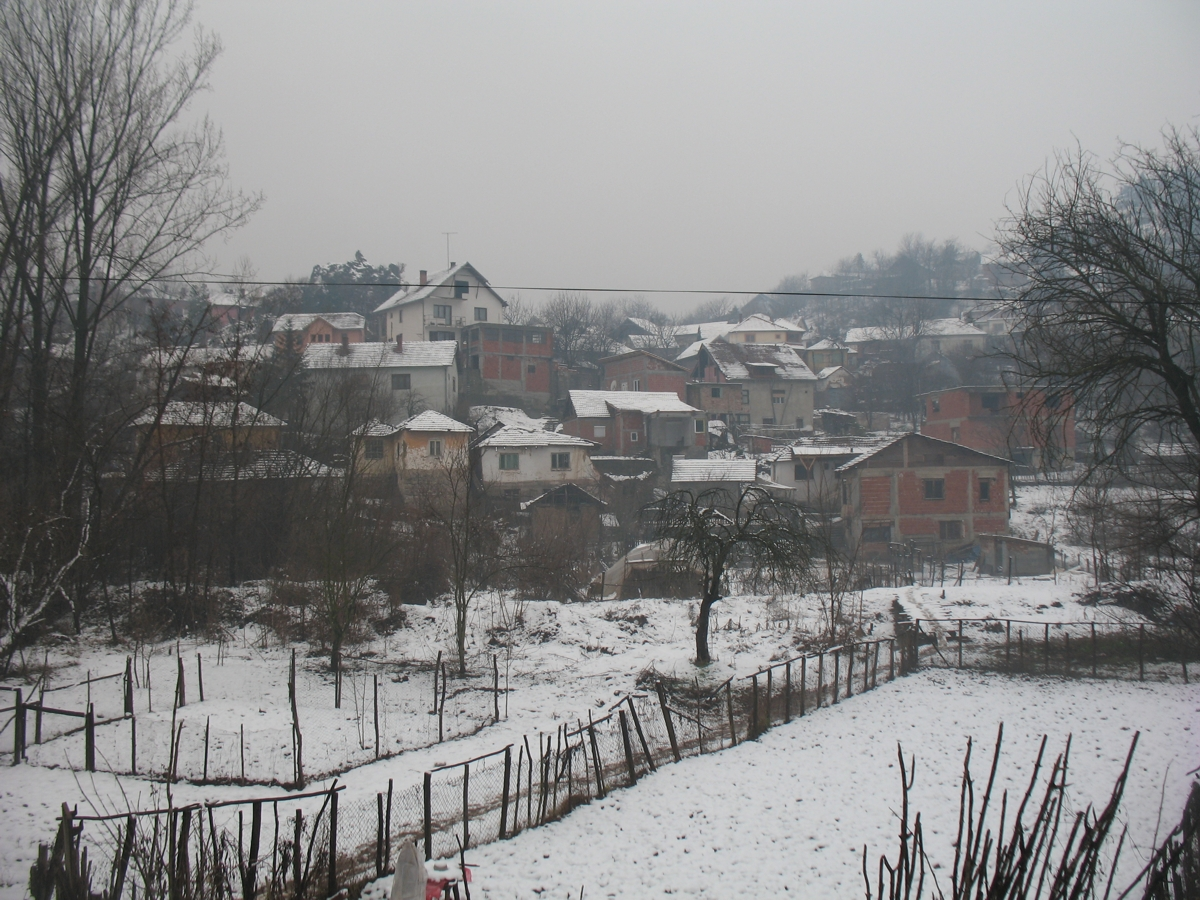

- Location within Serbia
- Country: Serbia
- Region: Southern and Eastern Serbia
- District: Nišava
- Municipality: Niška Banja
- Time zone: UTC+1 (CET)
  - Summer (DST): UTC+2 (CEST)

Jelašnica is a village situated in Niška Banja municipality in Serbia.

South of the village is the protected area of the Jelašnica Gorge, while southwest of it is the Pešturina cave, one of the latest surviving Neanderthal habitats.

== Rock climbing in Jelašnica ==
Jelašnica gorge is one of the largest rock climbing destinations in Serbia, with over 230 bolted routes, graded from 5a to 8c, and around 150 boulders, graded from 4 to 7b+.

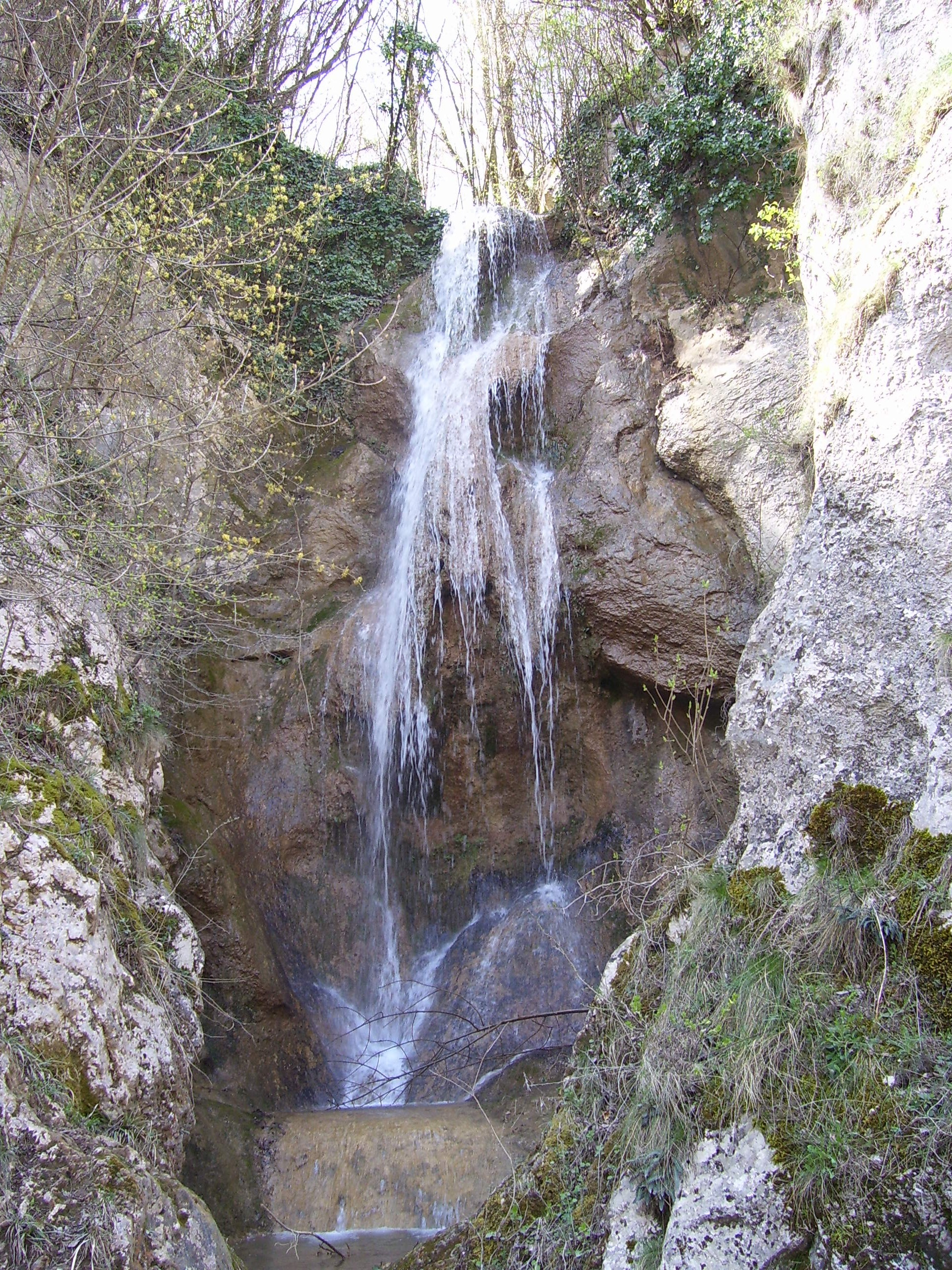
Jelašnica waterfall in Jelašnica Gorge

== Notable people ==
- Ljubiša Samardžić
