= Gornja Studena =

Gornja Studena Горња Студена
- Village
- Location within Serbia
- Country: Serbia
- Region: Southern and Eastern Serbia
- District: Nišava
- Municipality: Niška Banja
- Time zone: UTC+1 (CET)
  - Summer (DST): UTC+2 (CEST)

Gornja Studena is a village situated in Niška Banja municipality in Serbia.
