= Prosek, Niška Banja =

Prosek Просек
- Village
- Location within Serbia
- Coordinates: 43°18′38″N 22°03′05″E
- Country: Serbia
- District: Nišava District
- Municipality: Niška Banja

Area
  - Total: 3.32 km^{2} (1.28 sq mi)
- Elevation: 386 m (1,266 ft)

Population (2011)
  - Total: 599
  - Density: 180/km^{2} (467/sq mi)

Prosek (Serbian Cyrillic: Просек) is a village in the municipality of Niška Banja, within the city of Niš, Serbia. According to the 2011 census, the village had 599 inhabitants.

According to the Ottoman Empire census of 1516, the village was one of the 111 within the Niš district, with 5 households, 3 widowed households, and 2 single households.
