= Kuteena =

Village in Rajasthan, India

- village
- Location in Rajasthan, India Kuteena (India)
- Coordinates: 28.043°N 76.456°E
- Country: India
- State: Rajasthan
- District: District.Kotputli -behror
- Elevation: 367 m (1,204 ft)

Population (2008)
  - Total: 5,500

Languages
  - Official: Hindi
- Time zone: UTC+5:30 (IST)
- PIN: 301708
- ISO 3166 code: RJ-IN
- Vehicle registration: RJ02-

Kuteena is a village in the Neemrana subdistrict of the Alwar District in the state of Rajasthan in India. It is located in the foothills of Aravali.

Currently this village in kotputli - behror district.(from..7aug.2023)

== Location ==
Kuteena is located 10 km from Rajasthan's northeastern border with Haryana and 10 km from National Highway number 8 (NH-8) at Shahajahanpur. The nearest railway station (Bawal) is 20 km away. Kuteena is surrounded by Siryaani to the south, Gugalkota to the west, Giglana to the east, and Kaankar & Rajgarh to the north. It is in a valley amidst the Aravalli Range. The region of Neemrana (including Kuteena) and Behror was earlier entitled as Rath are due to their culture and language was named Rathi after that, with their tag line as - Kath Nave Par Rath Nave Na.

== Temples ==
Kuteena has many temples: Chauganan Mata, Jugni Mata, Durga Mata, Hanumanji, Thakur ji, Gogaji Maharaj, Santoshi Mata, Baba Kundan Das. The Temple of Dadi Jagni is also situated in village Kuteena, and also a temple of 1008 Baba Mohan Das is situated in village Kuteena.The temple of Saint Baba Kundandas and the Durga Mata Temple are located on a hilltop. Durga mata temple is being beautifully constructed into a complex. After completion it will contain a gufa, temple and park.

A memorial, Nau-Gaja was also built by the villagers in memory of the martyrs of a short time war of 1880s, held between them and the Maharaja of Neemrana at that time.

== Economy ==
In the past, the economy of Kuteena was based mainly on agriculture but now it is also on Defence, paramilitary and police services. However, it has also now shifting towards business and industry. Nearby industrial hubs like Gurgaon, Shahajahanpur, Neemrana, Behror, Bhiwadi, Khushkhera, ghiloth Japanese zone 2 and Alwar employ many of the residents, leading to higher family incomes and living standards.

== Culture ==
Due to its location, the village culture has been influenced by Haryana. Rath is the main spoken language. The village has a diverse culture with a strong impact of Rajput culture. Most of the Hindu festivals are celebrated here. Holi, Deepawali, Gangaur are the major festivals. Baba Kundandas fair celebrated annually in the village along with sports events. Nowadays the marriages are done with the residents of Haryana which has also brought the culture of Haryana here.

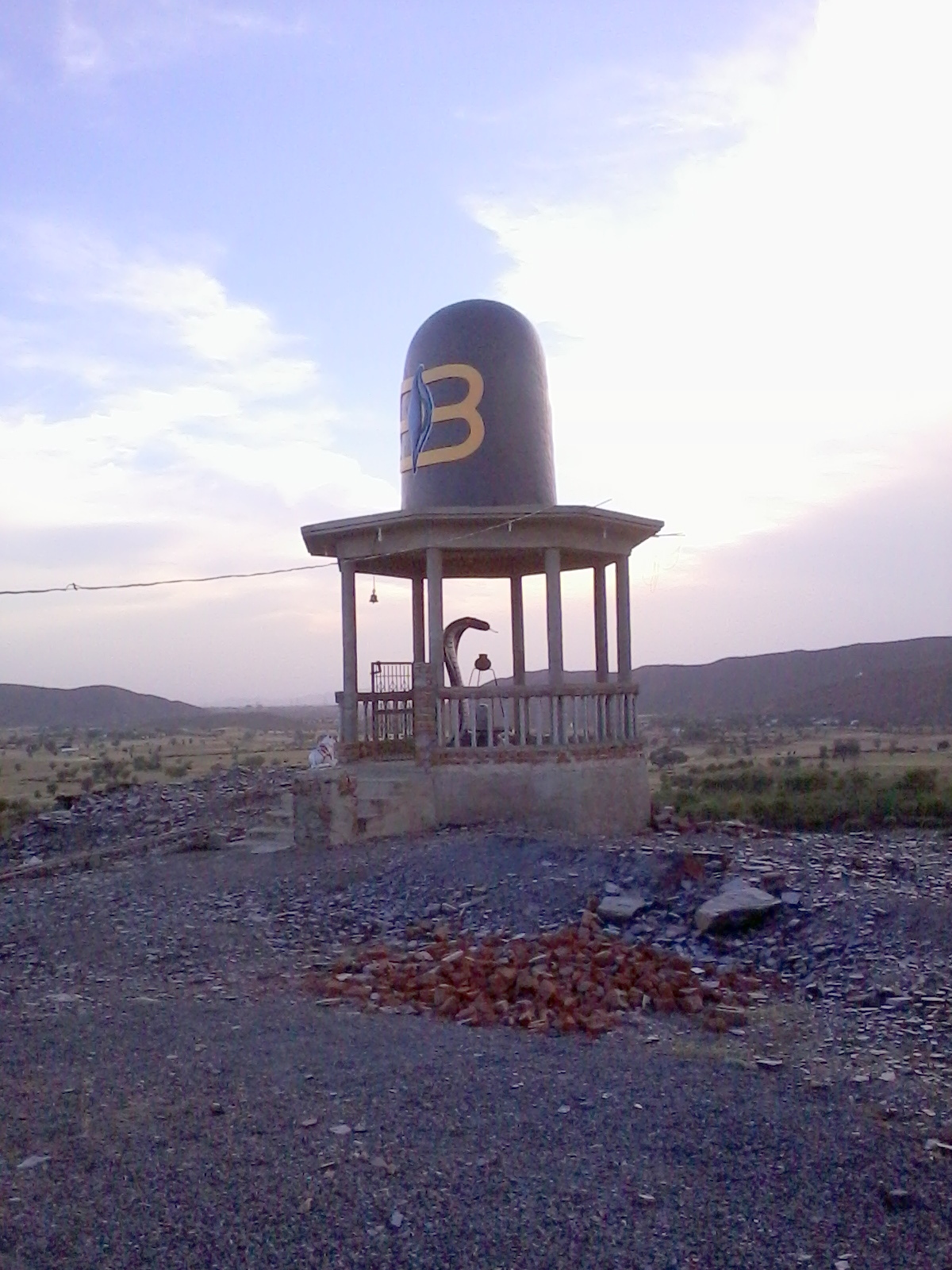
THE SHIVLING

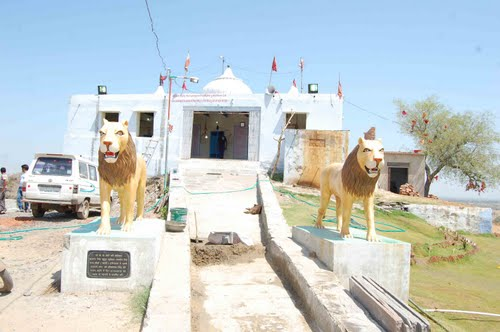
Mata ka darbar temple at Kuteena

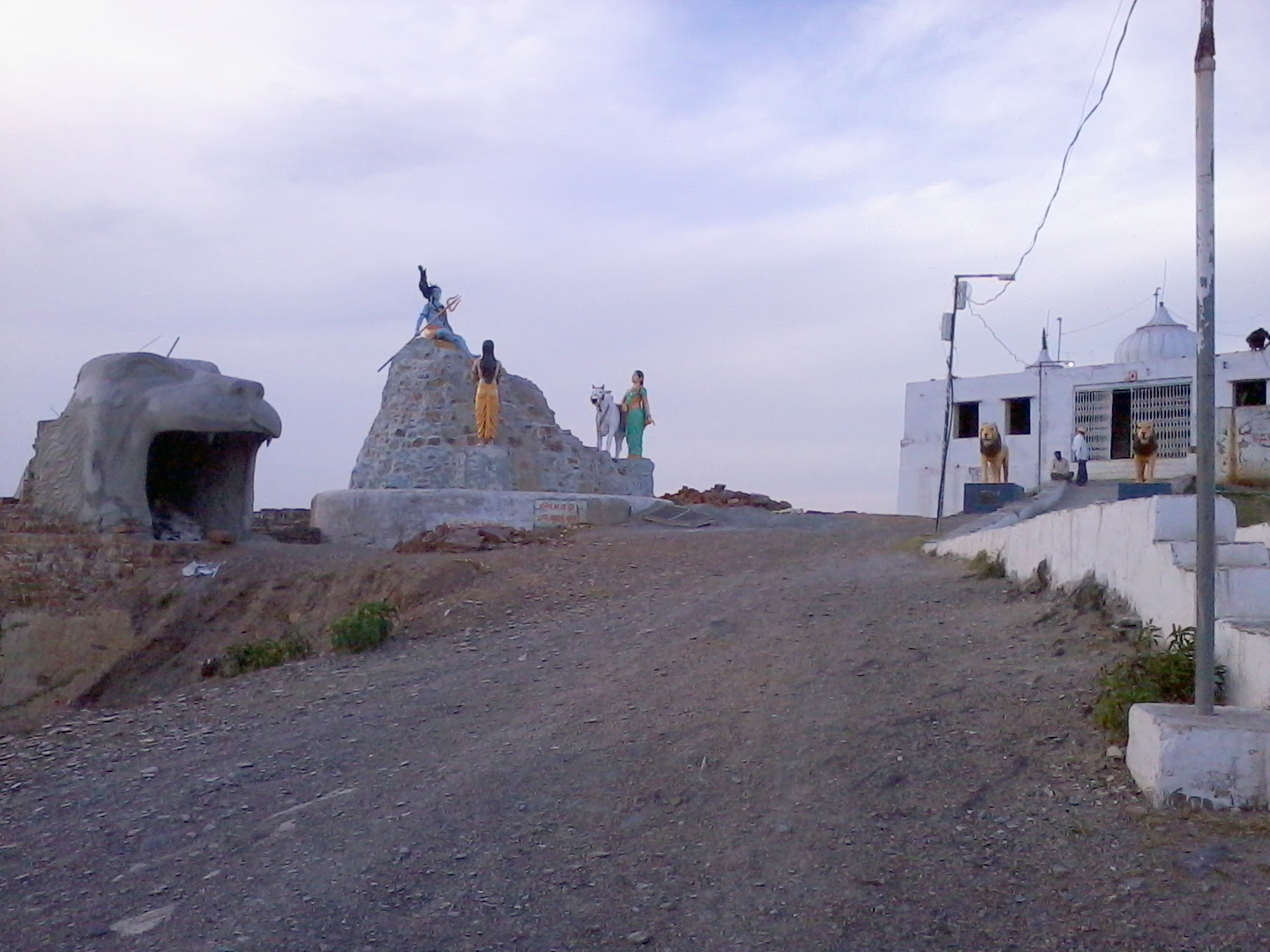
temple dham

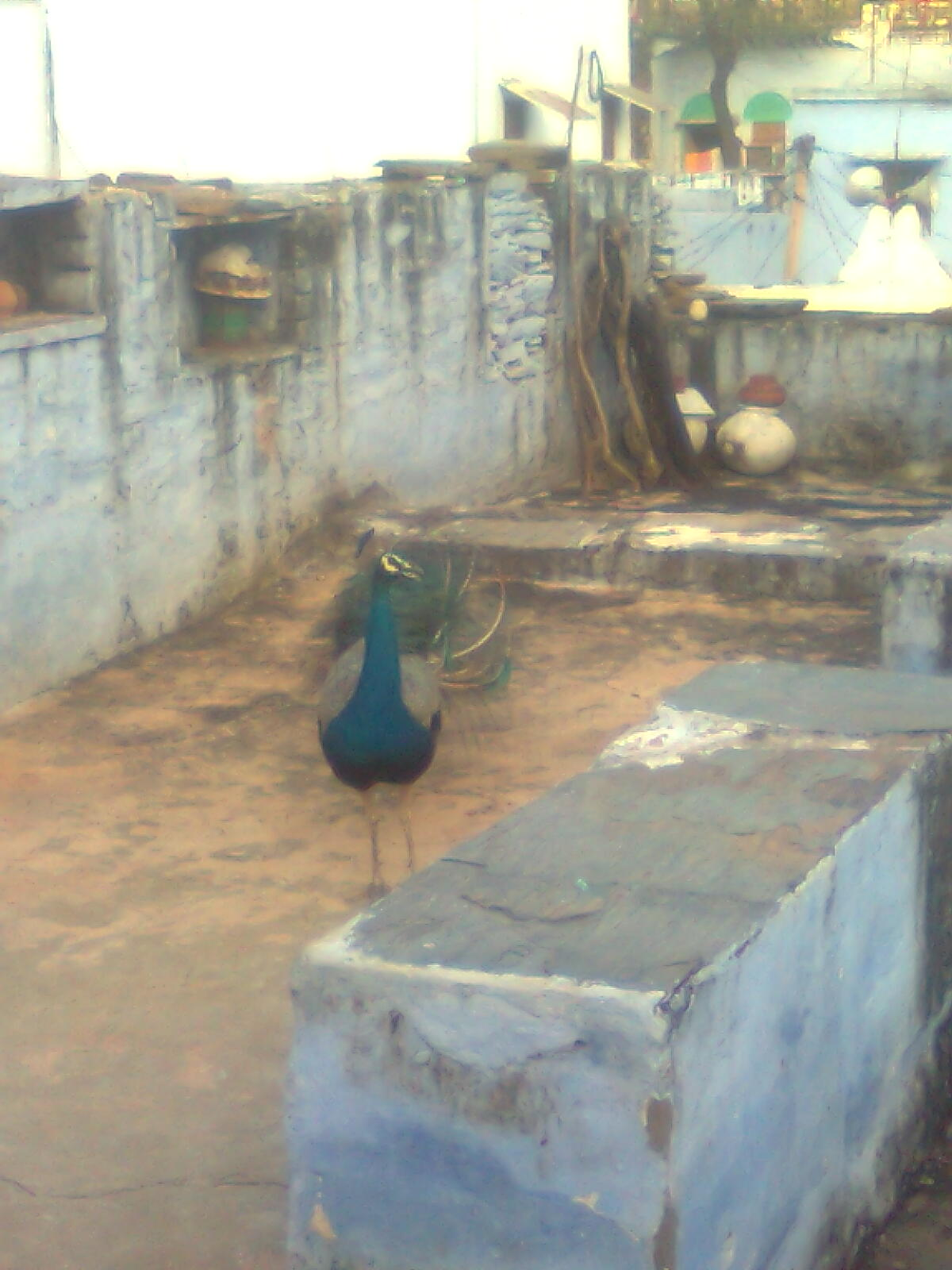
Peacock at kutina

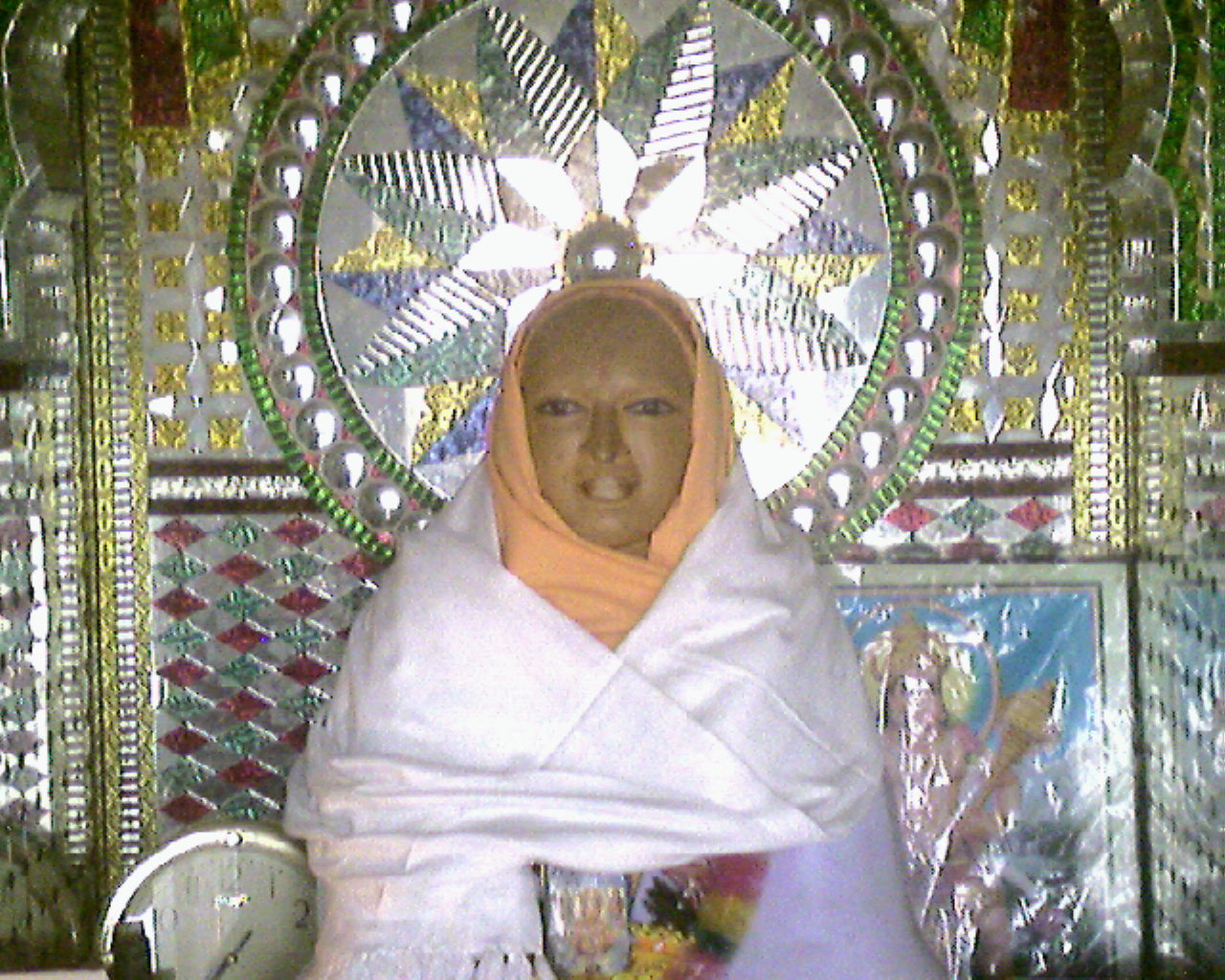
Baba Kundandas

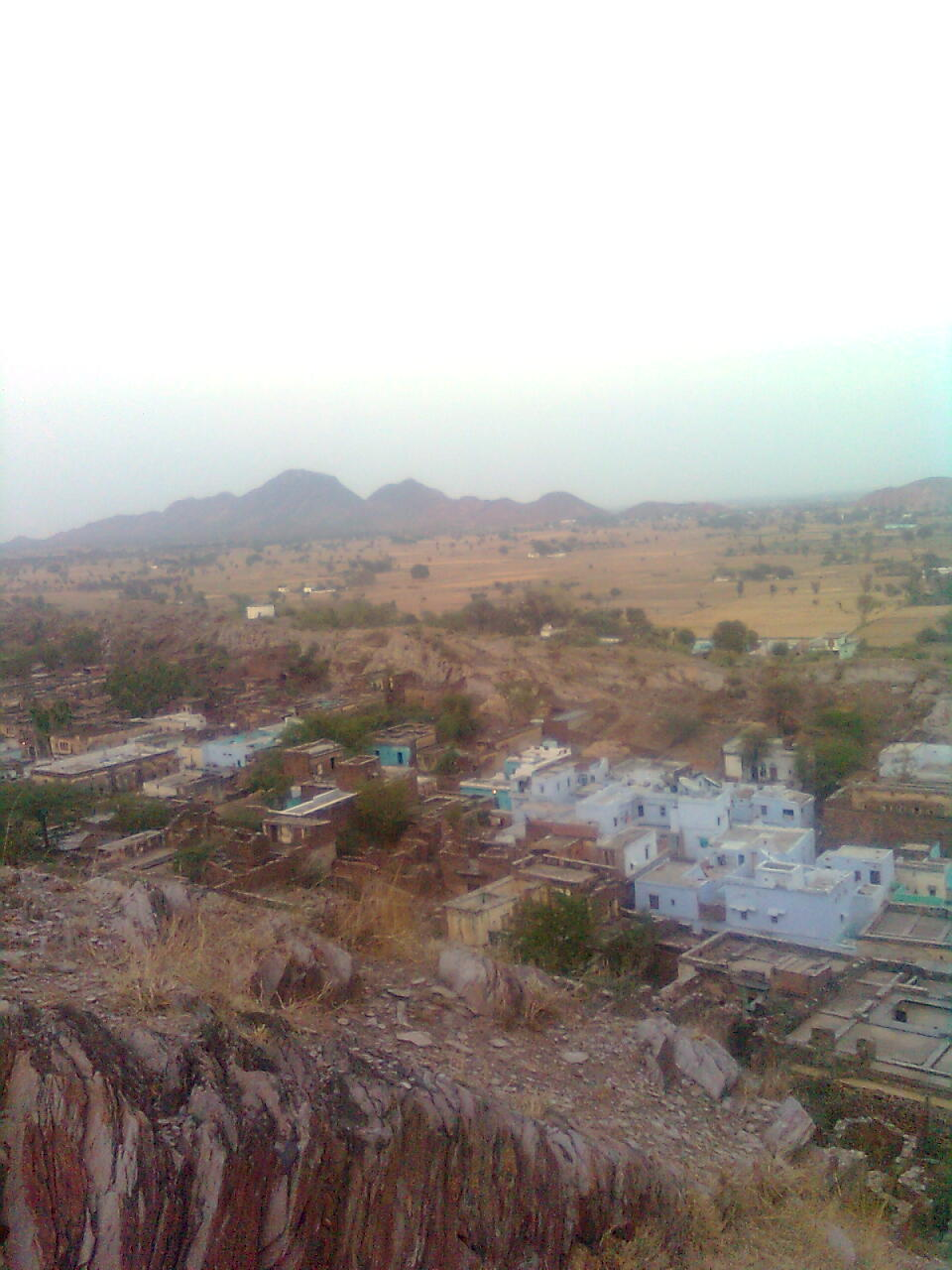
hill view
