= Čukljenik (Leskovac) =

Čukljenik Чукљеник
- Village
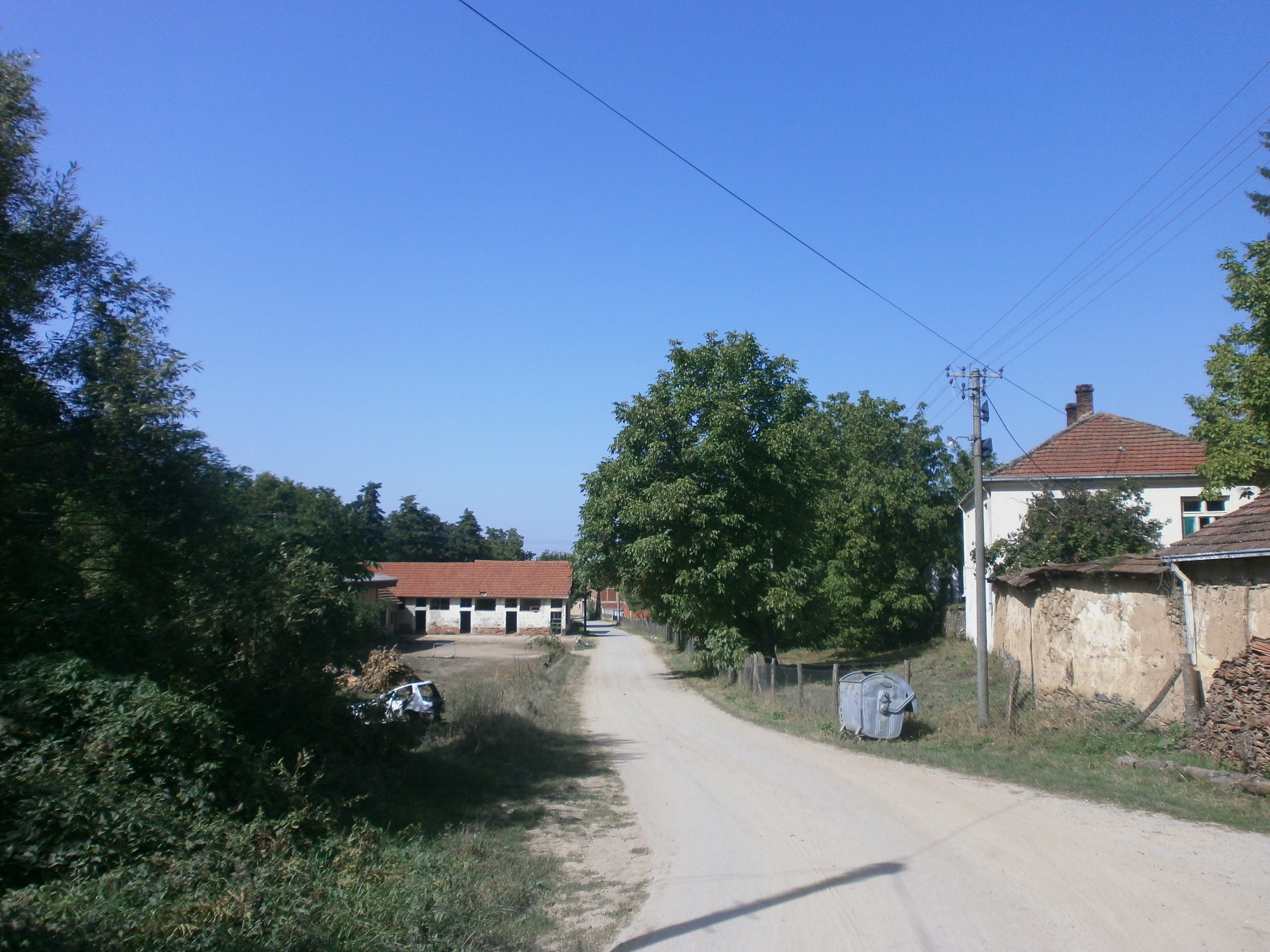
- A main street.

- Location within Serbia
- Coordinates: 42°52′09″N 21°57′33″E
- Country: Serbia
- District: Jablanica District
- Municipality: Leskovac

Population (2002)
  - Total: 636
- Time zone: UTC+1 (CET)
  - Summer (DST): UTC+2 (CEST)

Čukljenik is a village in the municipality of Leskovac, Serbia. According to the 2002 census, the village has a population of 636 people.

== Gallery ==
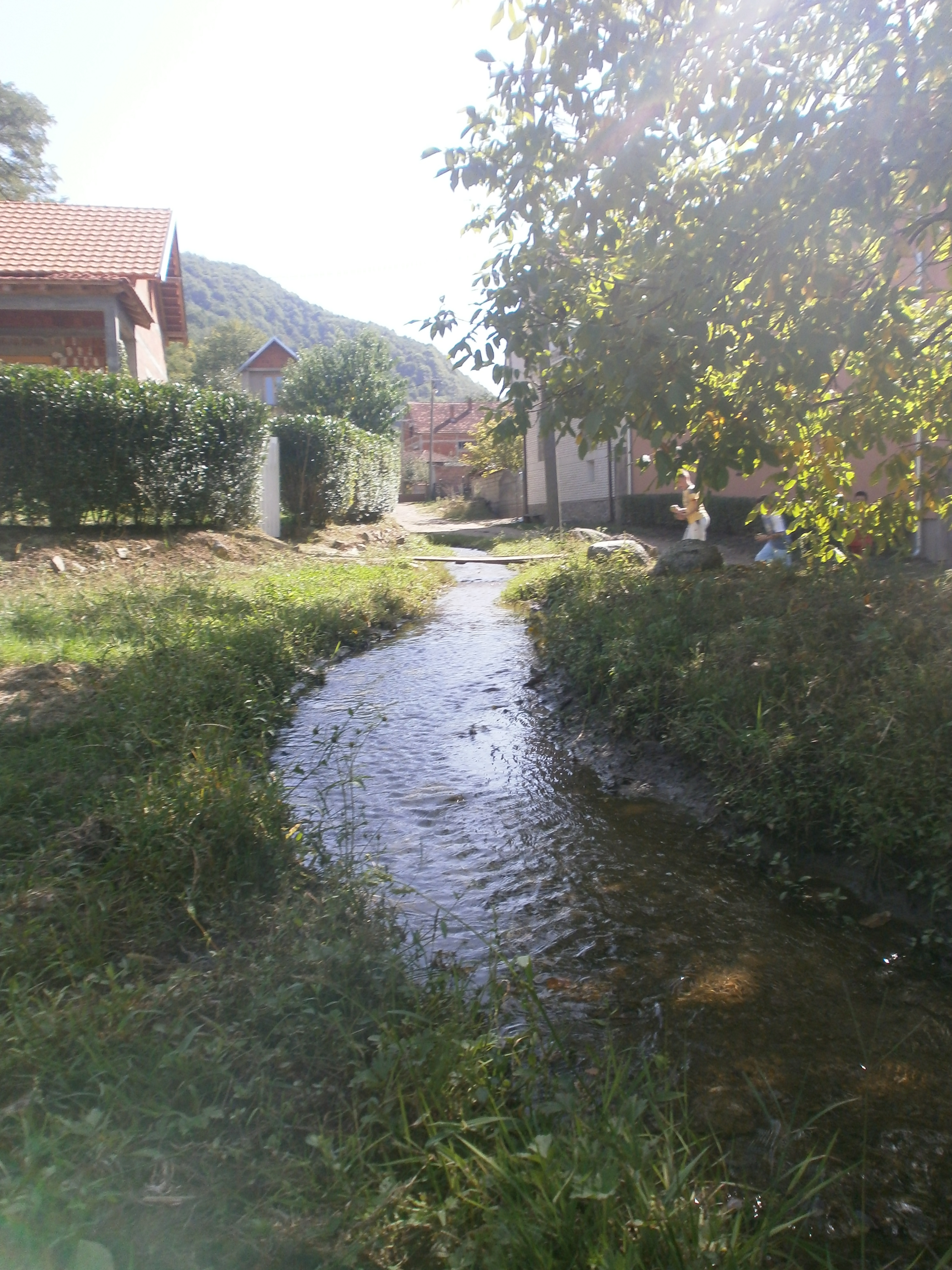
The Mala river.

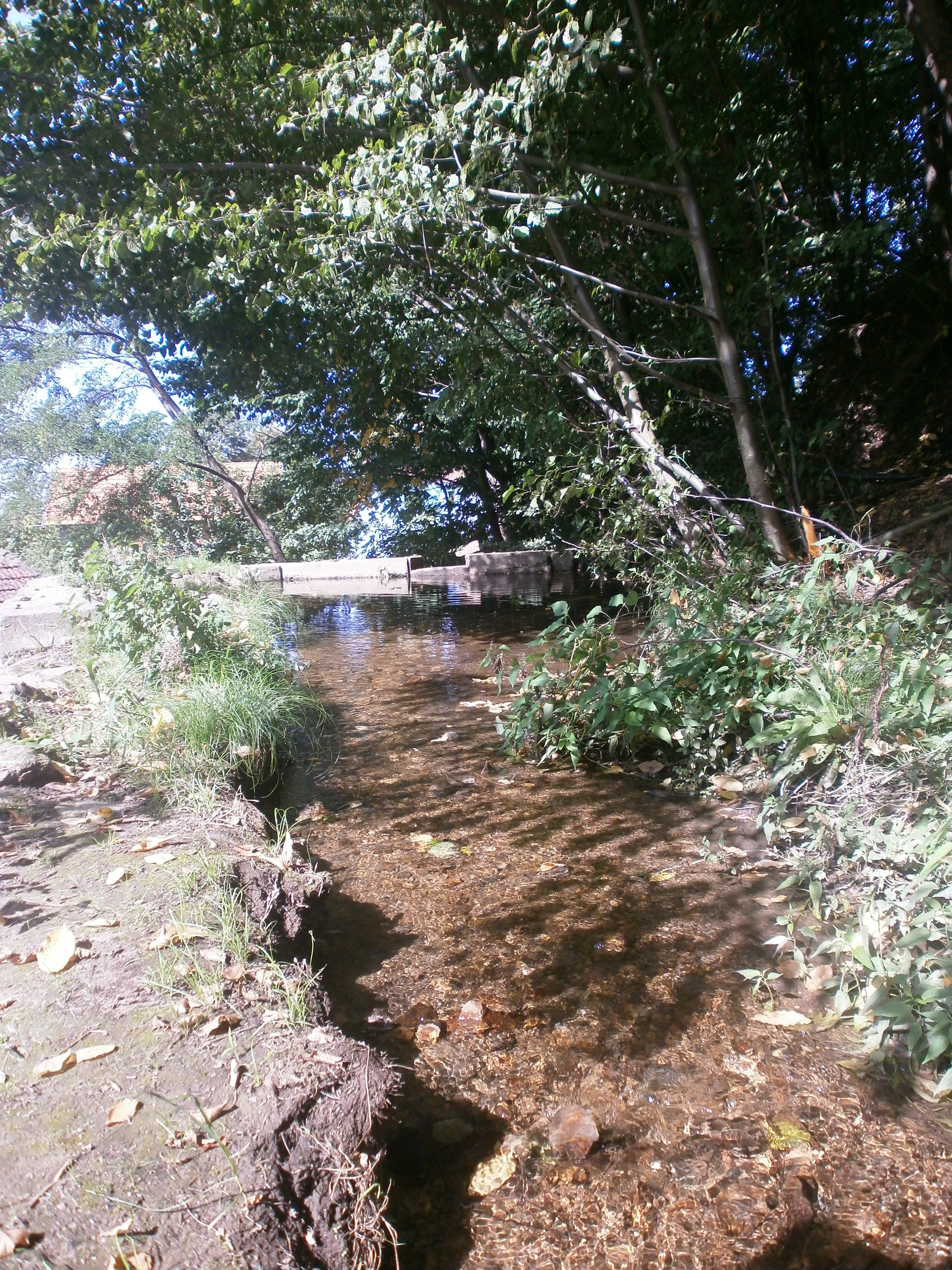
The Mala river.

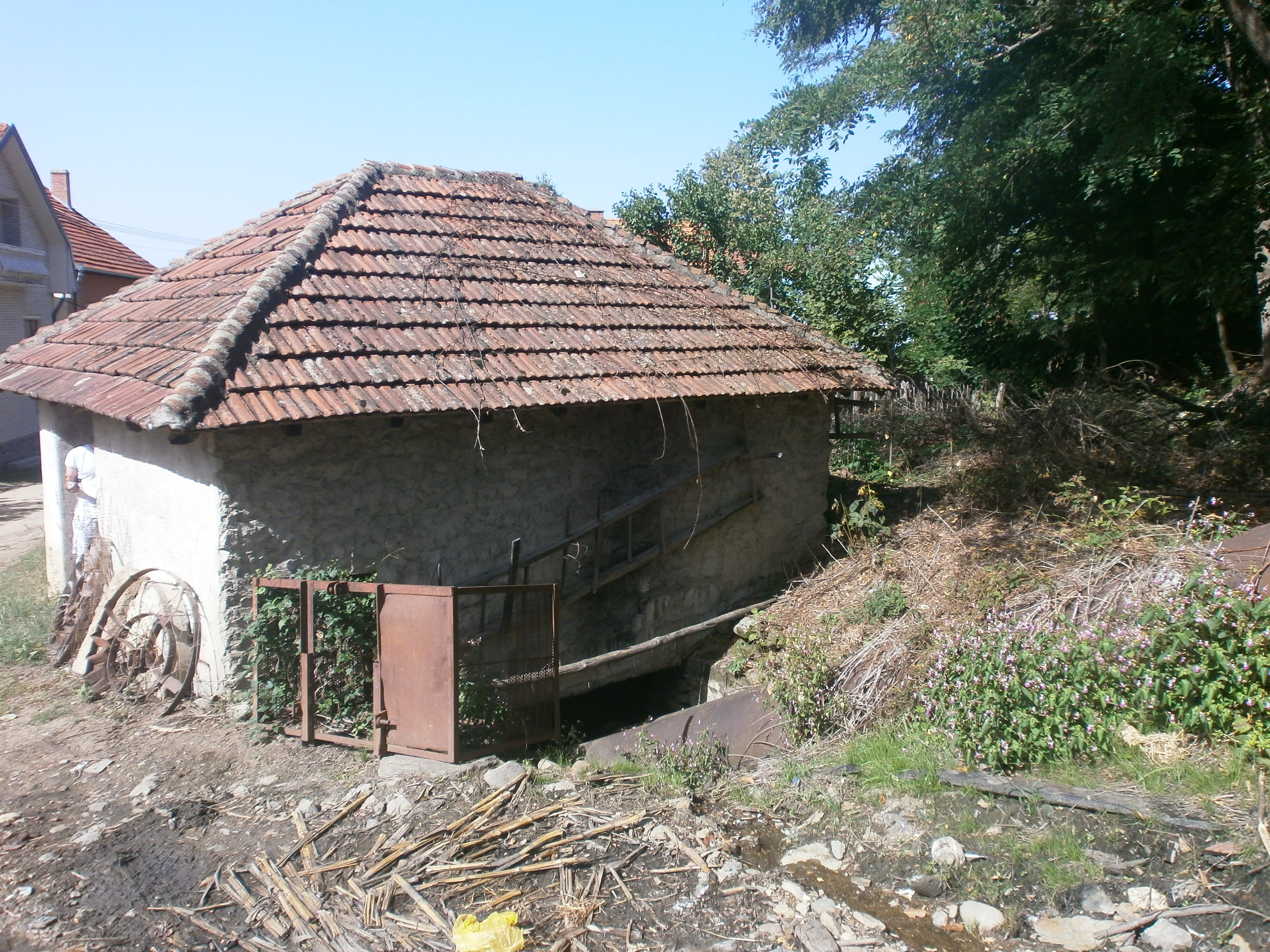
A water mill.

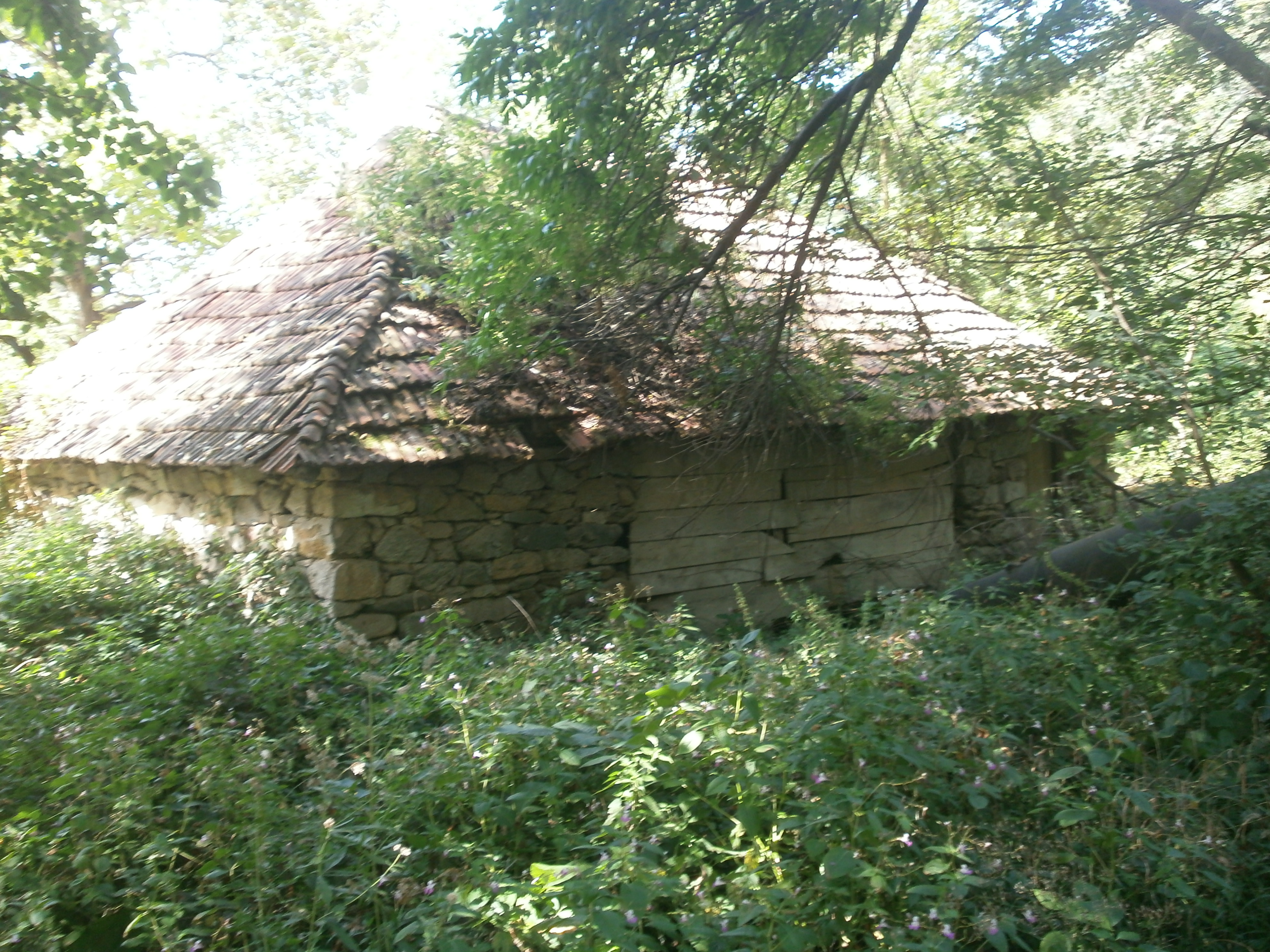
A water mill.

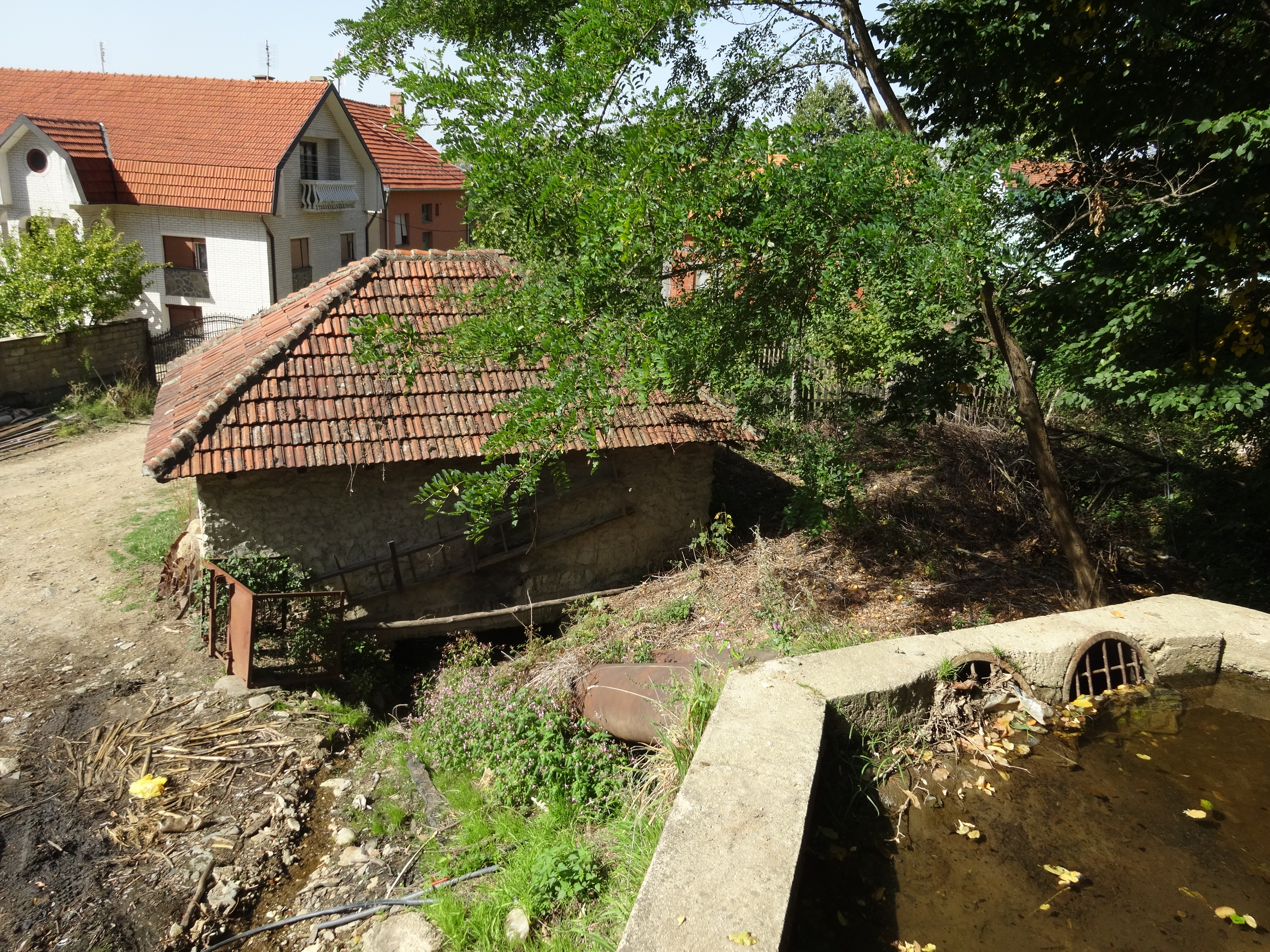
A water mill.

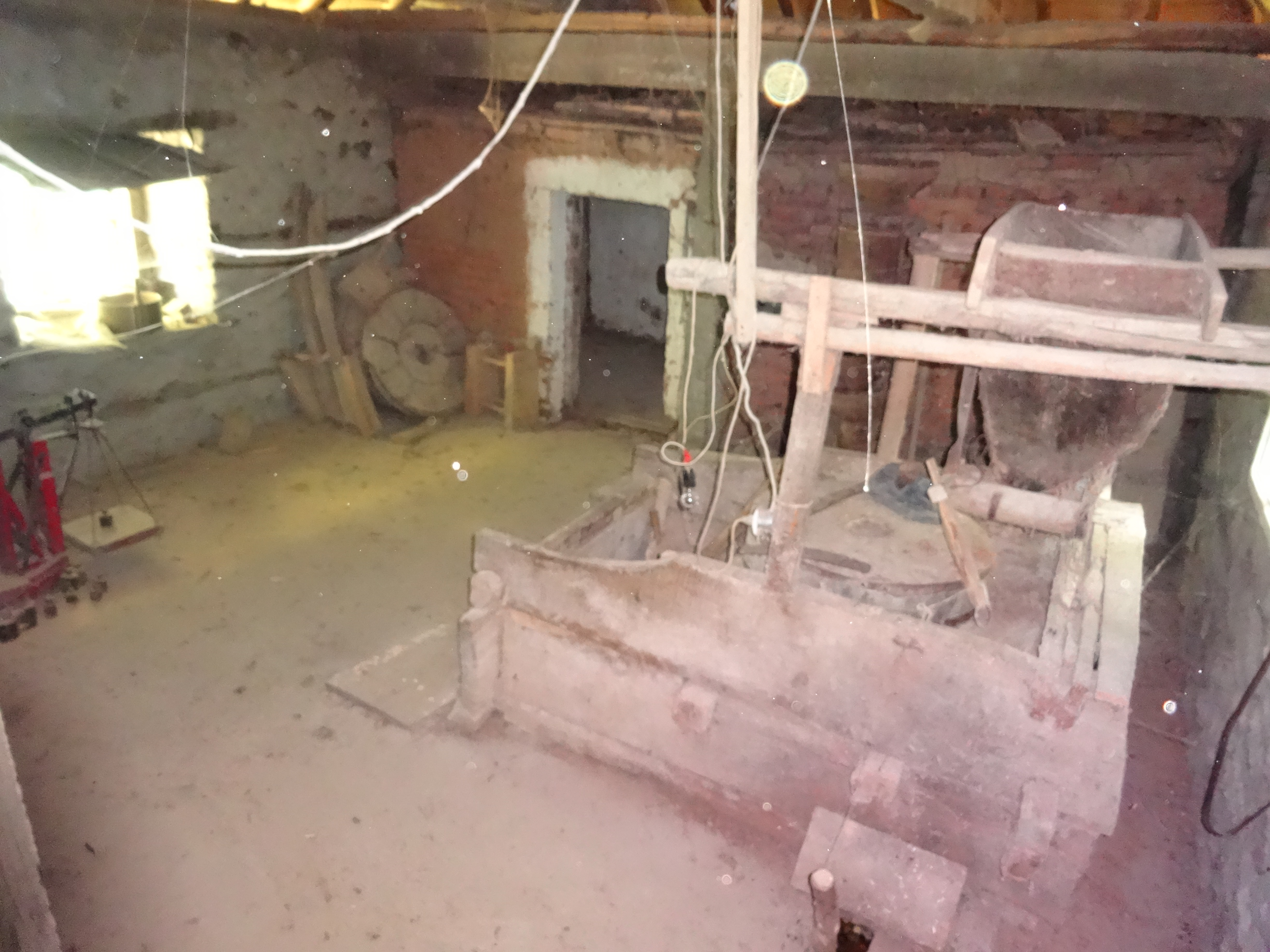
A monastery's water mill.

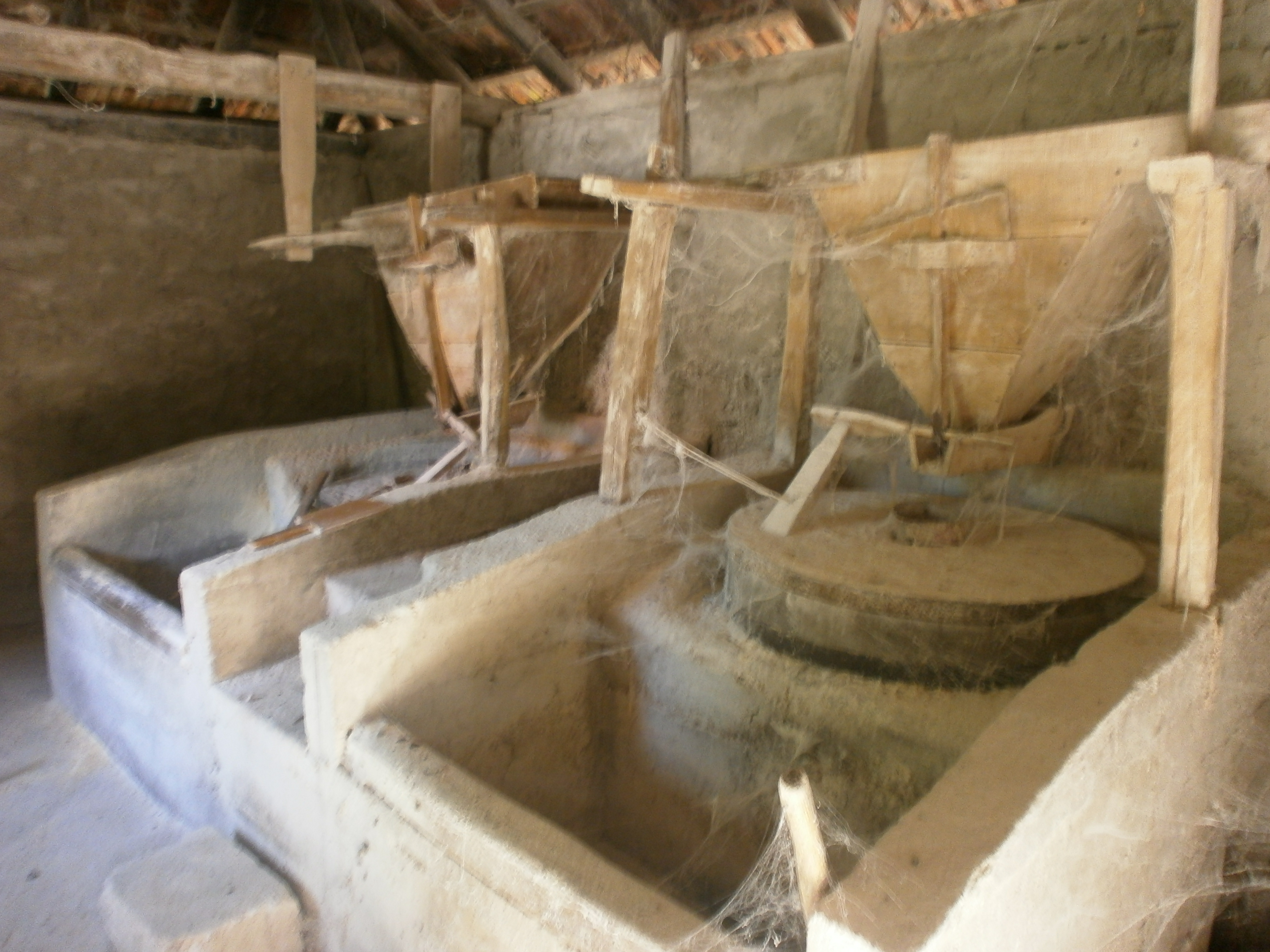
A water mill.

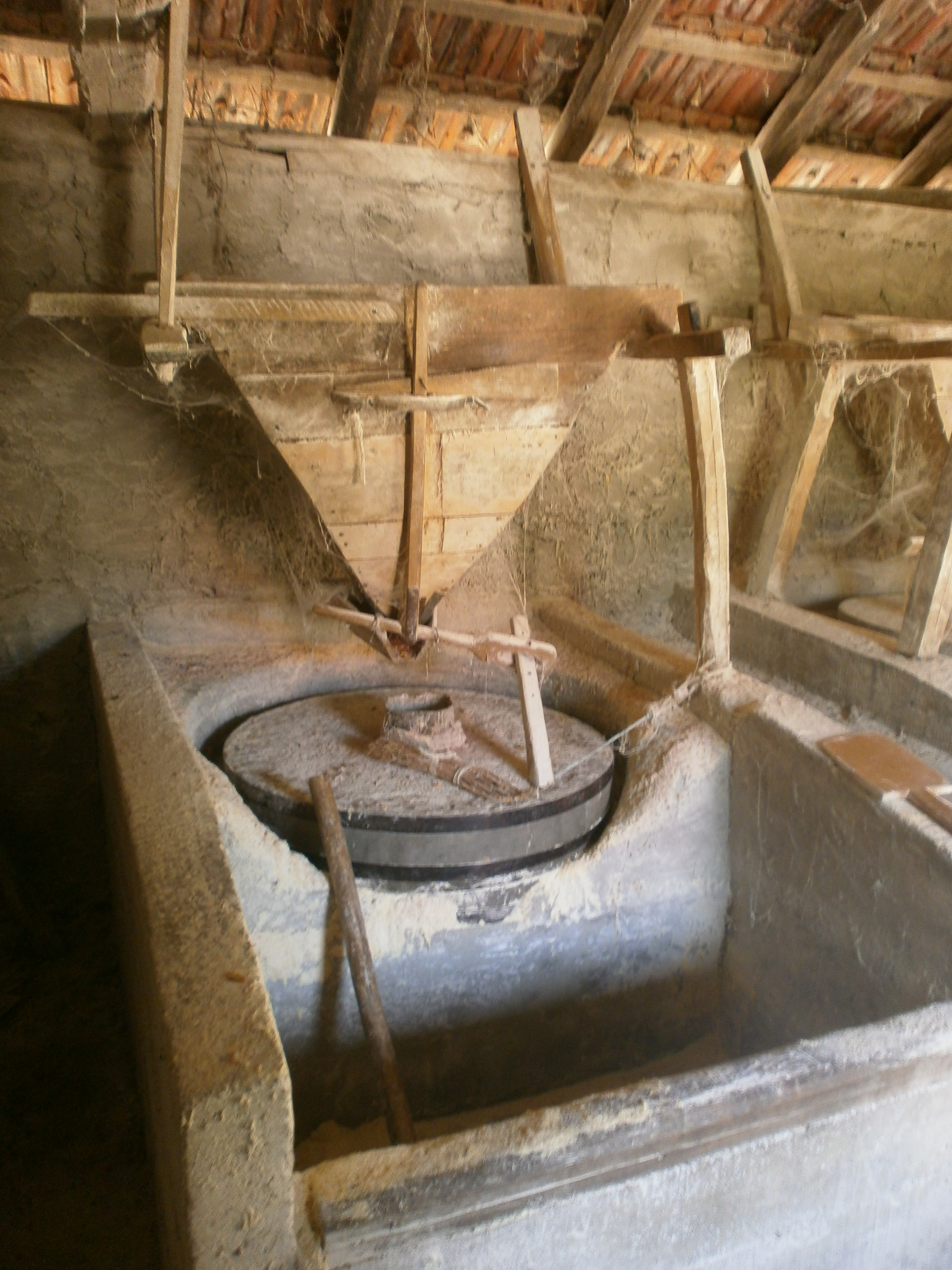
A water mill.

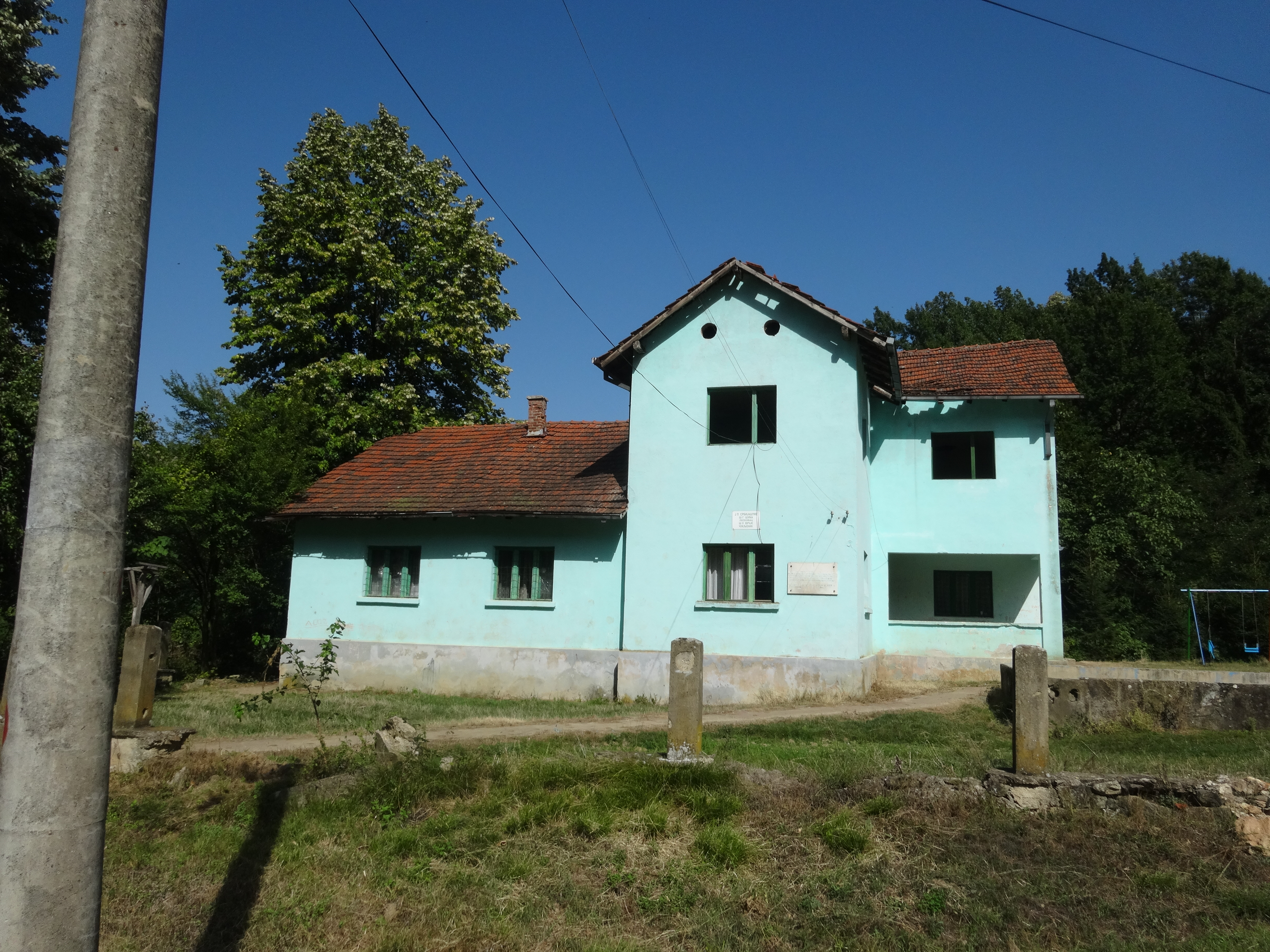
A primary school.

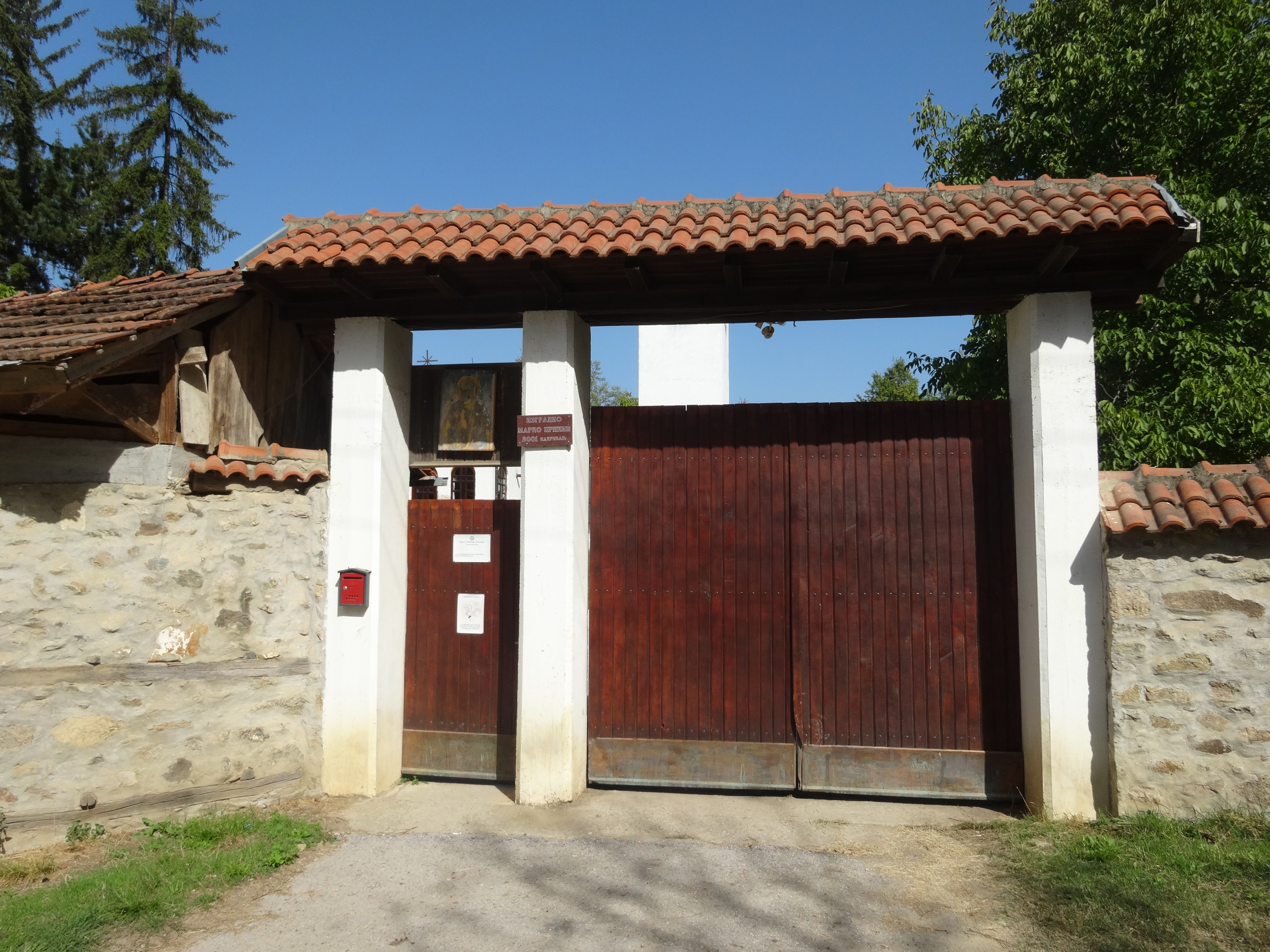
An entrance to the church.

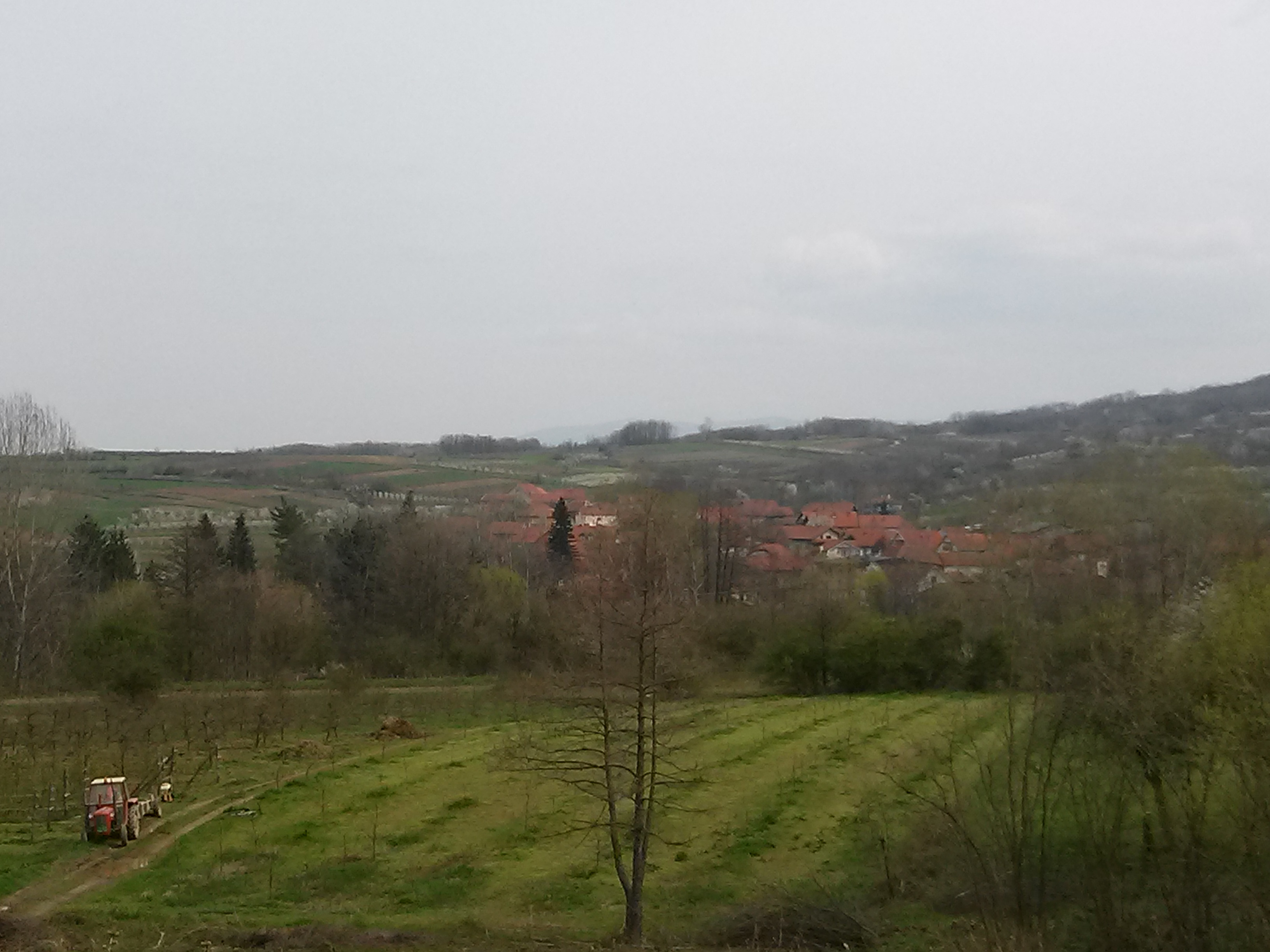
Panorama of the village.
