= Giglana =

Giglana is a village situated at 12 km (7 mi) distance from Neemrana in North Direction, Rajasthan, India. This village is covered With two sides by hills.
