= Niška Banja =

Niška Banja Нишка Бања
- Town and city municipality
- City municipality of Niška Banja; Градска општина Нишка Бања
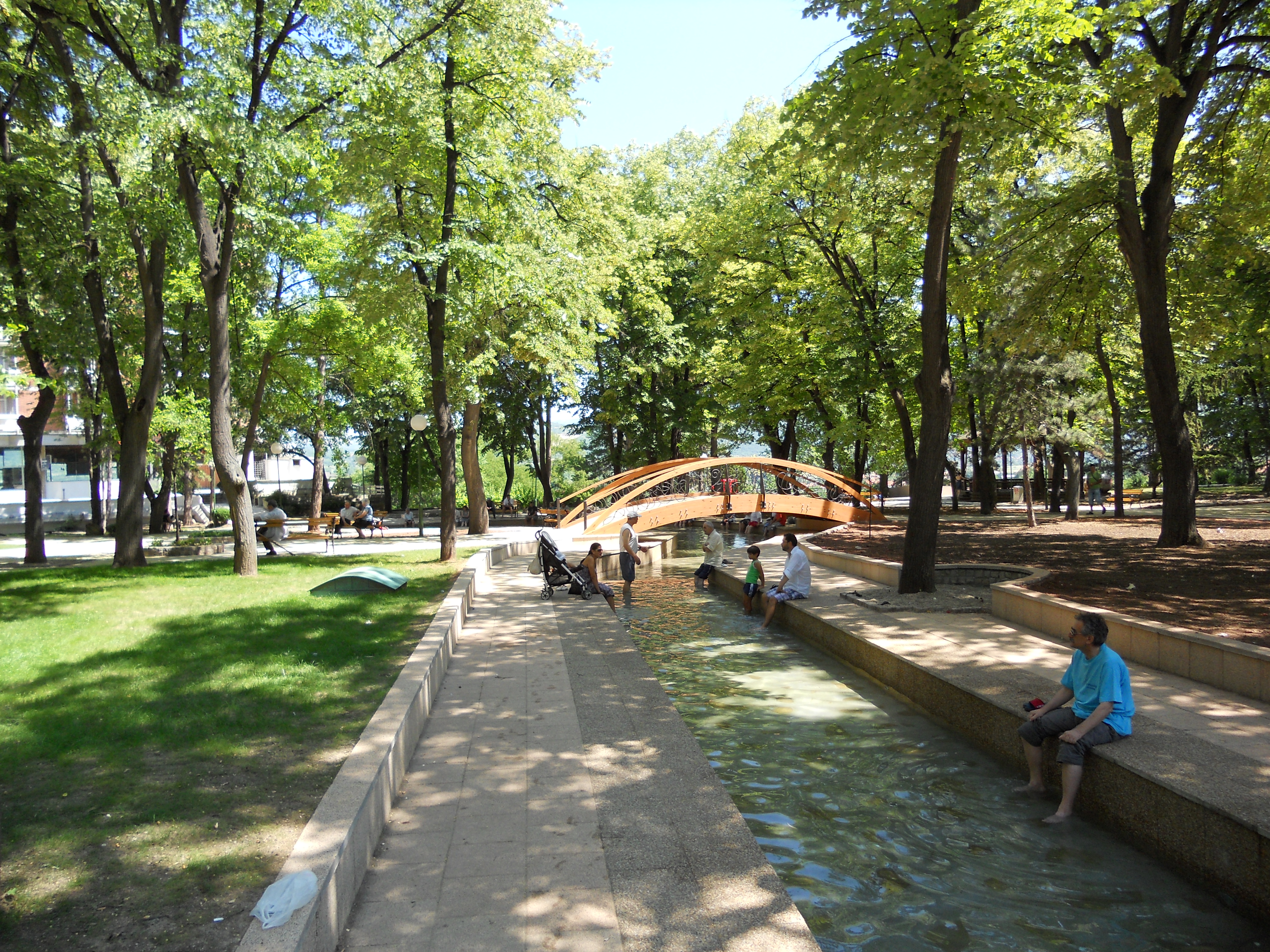
- Public channel of thermal water

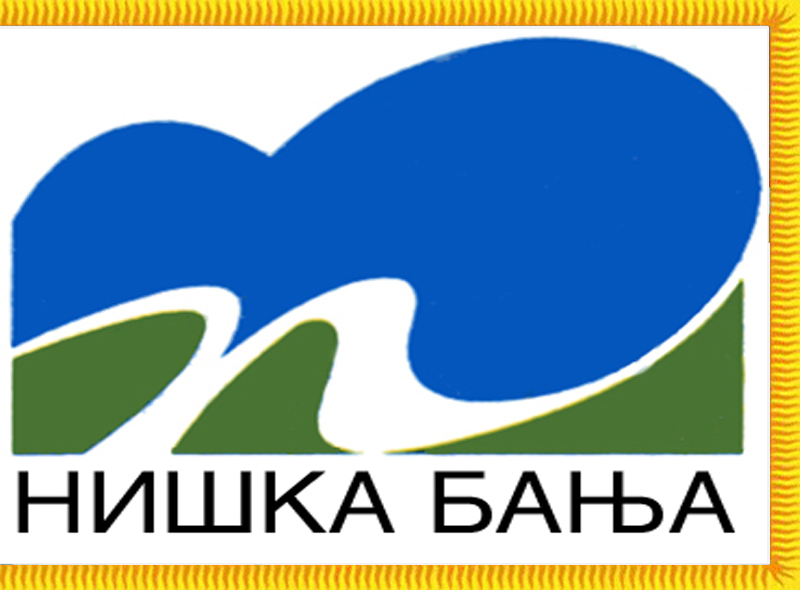
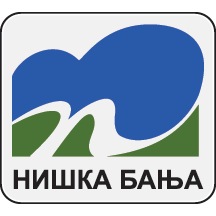
- Flag Coat of arms

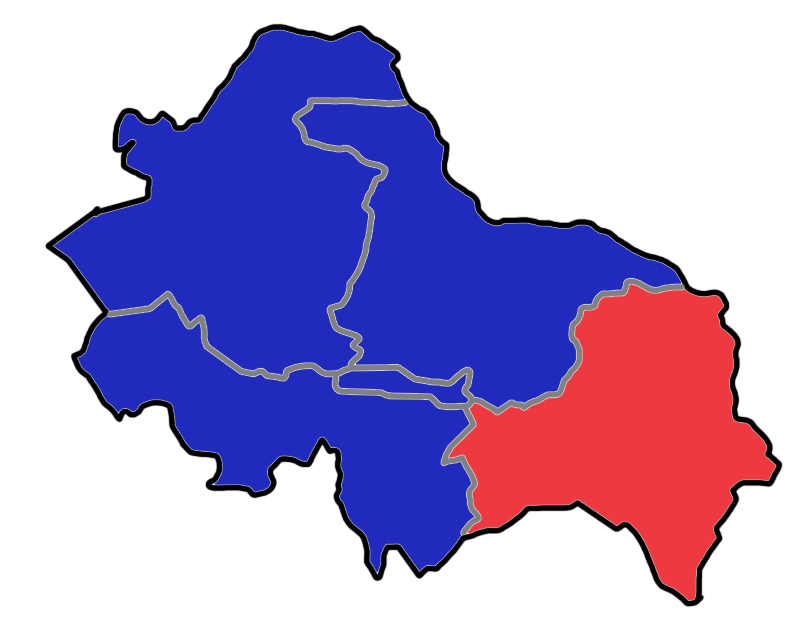
- Location of the municipality of Niška Banja within City of Niš
- Coordinates: 43°17′36″N 22°00′22″E
- Country: Serbia
- Region: Southern and Eastern Serbia
- District: Nišava
- City: Niš
- Settlements: 18

Government
  - Mayor: Dušan Živković (SNS)

Area
  - Municipality: 146.28 km^{2} (56.48 sq mi)

Population (2011 census)
  - Urban: 4,380
  - Municipality: 14,098
- Time zone: UTC+1 (CET)
  - Summer (DST): UTC+2 (CEST)
- Postal code: 18205
- Area code: +381(0)18
- Car plates: NI

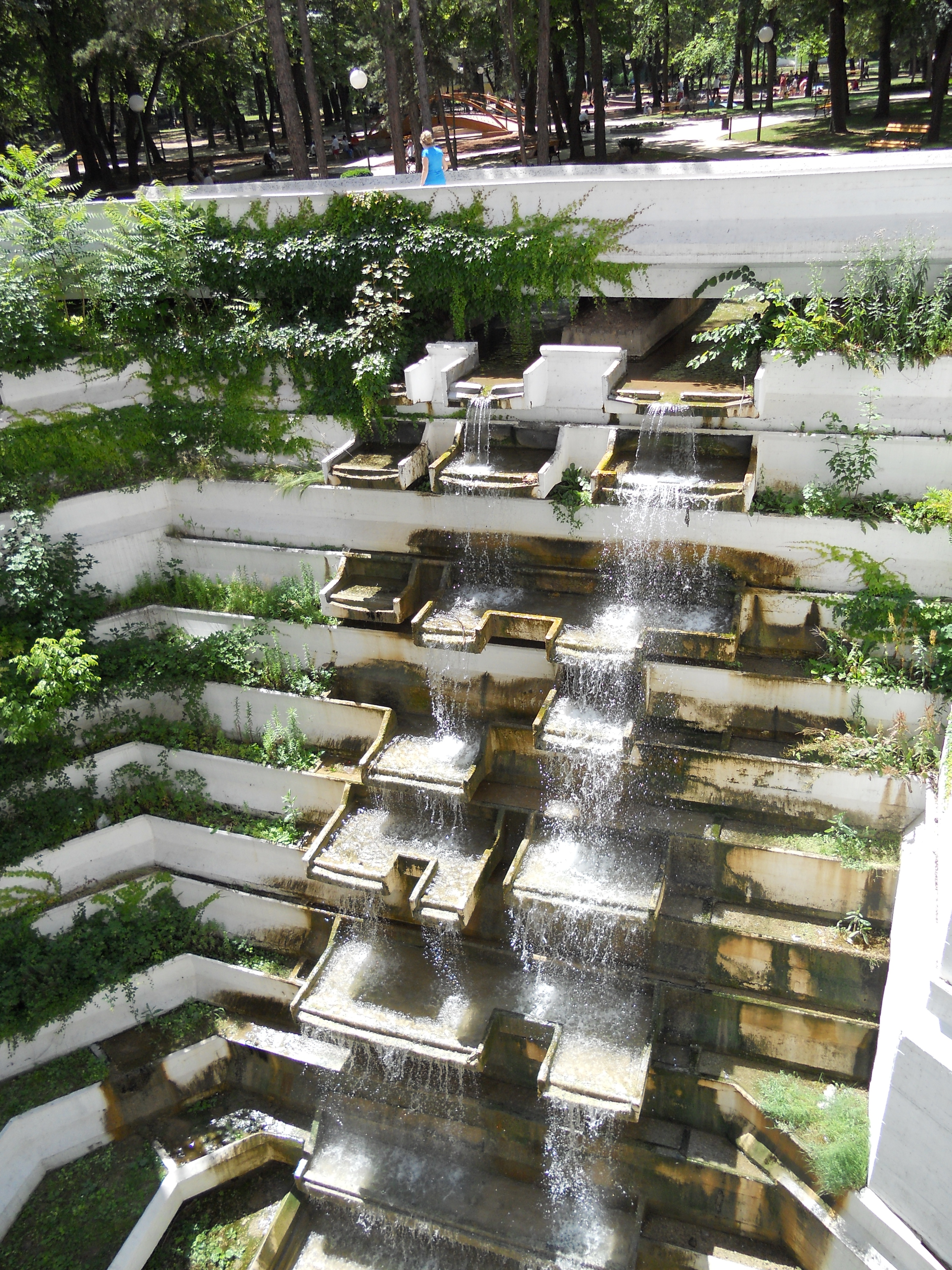
Cascade waterfall.

Niška Banja (Serbian Cyrillic: Нишка Бања) is a town and one of five city municipalities which constitute the city of Niš. It is also one of the spa resorts in Serbia. It is located 9 kilometres (6 mi) east of Niš.

According to the 2011 census, the population of the town is 4,380, while the population of the municipality is 14,098.

== Geography ==
Niška Banja is situated 9 kilometres (5.6 mi) from Niš, just south from the main Niš–Sofia motorway. The municipality borders Palilula and Medijana municipalities in the west, Pantelej municipality in the north-west, Svrljig municipality in the north, Bela Palanka municipality in the east, and Gadžin Han municipality in the south. Niška Banja is situated at the bottom of Suva Planina Mountain. The closest airport is Niš Constantine the Great Airport.

== Demographics ==
As of 2022 census, the municipality has a population of 12,940 inhabitants, with 4,380 in the eponymous settlement.

=== Settlements ===
- Bancarevo, population 66
- Gornja Studena, population 322
- Donja Studena, population 290
- Jelašnica, population 1,590
- Koritnjak, uninhabited
- Kunovica, population 49
- Lazarevo Selo, population 149
- Manastir, population 6
- Nikola Tesla, population 4,651
- Niška Banja, population 4,380
- Ostrovica, population 475
- Prva Kutina, population 956
- Prosek, population 599
- Ravni Do, population 56
- Radikina Bara, population 60
- Rautovo, population 12
- Sićevo, population 772
- Čukljenik, population 247

== Tourism ==
Niška Banja spa is one of the best known centers of health tourism in Serbia and it is the third most popular spa in Serbia after Vrnjačka Banja and Sokobanja. It is well known for its hot, radio-active water containing radon. The spa is home of a Summer cultural festival. There are several hotels in Niška Banja: Partizan, Radon, Srbija, Ozren, and Terme. Also, numerous villas are available.

== History ==
Niška Banja is situated at the bottom of Suva Planina Mountain. It was first mentioned centuries ago, in 448, and with the remains and traces of antique (thermae - public baths ll cent.) and early Byzantine period it has been keeping its tradition and uniqueness. Saint Proust noted once down in 1768 that its bathroom in open was like the one in Budim. Even rice was grown here once.

During the 1920s, Banja started to develop intensively and methodically. Lights appeared in 1925, many famous people built their villas, promenades and parks were arranged, comfortable hotels were built and trams came from Niš all the way there in 1929. Today the spa is served by frequent buses instead of trams.

== Health ==
In Niška banja, there are 3 main springs that are used in the treatment of diseases. "Main Spring" ("King's Spring") provides 35-40l/s of water. It belongs to the most generous springs in Serbian spas, and the water temperature is from 38.2 to 38.9°C. It is counted among the radioactive homeotherms. Water from this spring in Niška banja contain microelements and small amounts of radioactive Radon and Kalium. Radioactivity is 425±31 mBq/l if we talk about Alpha particles and 702±37 mBq/l from Beta particles.

"Suva banja" is the second most important spring in Niška Banja. Gives 14-42 l/s of water. The water temperature varies from 12°C to 37°C. According to balneological classification, it belongs to radioactive hypothermia. It is characterized by considerable variability in temperature, yield and radioactivity.

At the "School Fountain" spring, the water temperature is from 17°C to 19°C, and the yield is about 2.5 l/s. It is used for drinking treatment. It belongs to radioactive hypothermia, with a significant content of calcium, magnesium, hydrocarbons, aluminum oxide, iron oxide and silicon dioxide.

The institute uses water from the natural spring "Glavni izvor" ("The King's Spring"). The water from this source is properly captured in the "Stari Kupatilo" building. Thus captured, a larger amount of water is piped to the different facilities of the Institute (pool "Staro Kupatilo" - 28.8m3, pool "Therme" - 36m3, pool "Zelengora" - 33m3, pool "Radon" - 500m3 and a larger number of tubs in all facilities). Niška Banja is thought to heal coronary and blood vessels diseases, increased blood pressure and rheumatic disorders. It also offers the treatment of orthopedic injuries, body weight control, anti-cellulite treatments and postoperative rehabilitation. The Institute of Niška Banja is equipped with modern amenities.

== International relations ==
=== Twin towns — Sister cities ===
Niška Banja is twinned with:

- Sofades, Greece

== Notable people ==
- Ljubiša Samardžić, grew up in Jelašnica
- Vojislav V. Jovanović, Serbian novelist and writer of short stories, prose and poems.

== Gallery ==
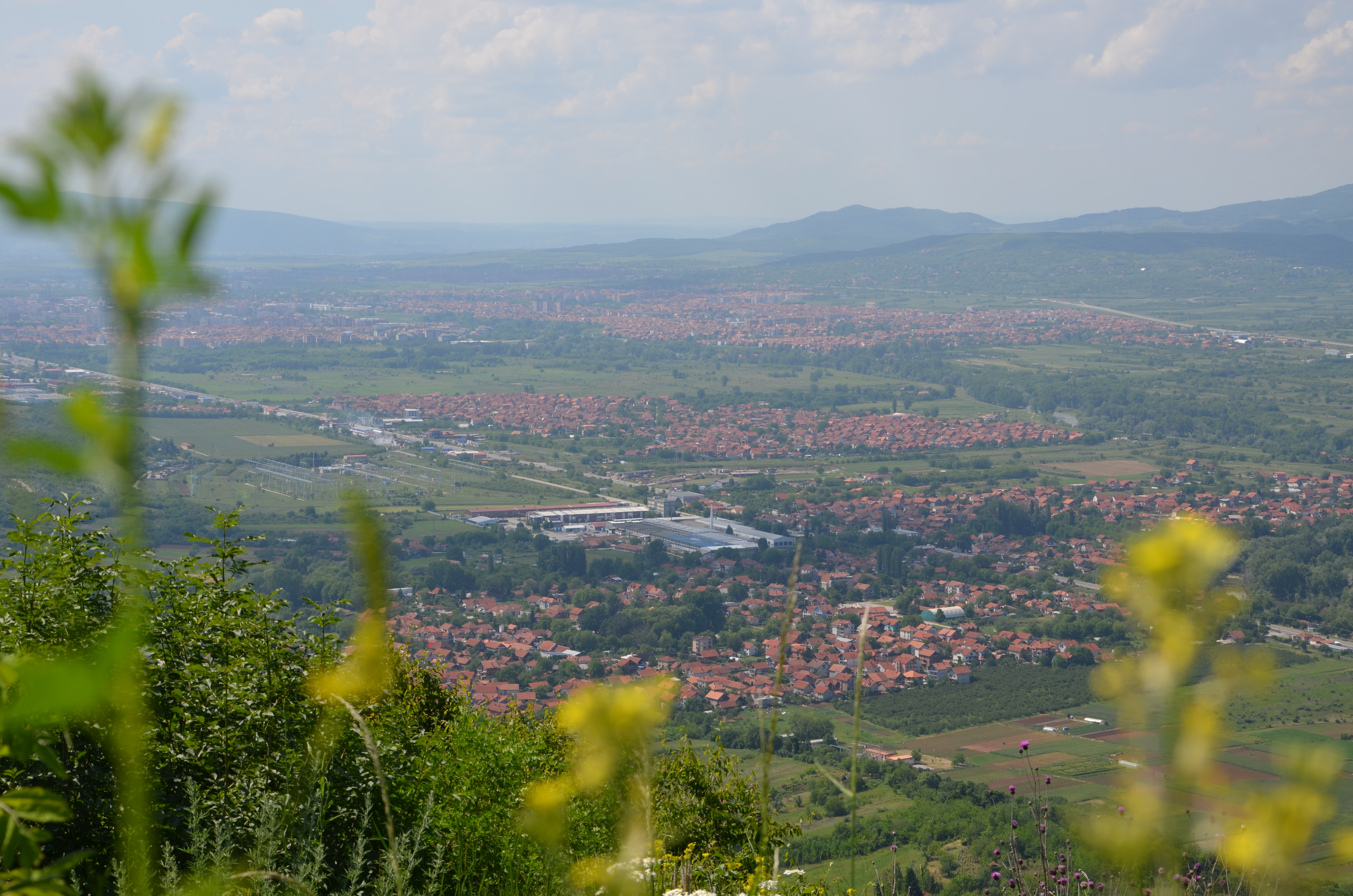
A look at the Niska banja from the hill.

== See also ==
- List of spa towns in Serbia
