= Belgrade University Library =

Academic library in Serbia

- Универзитетска библиотека Светозар Марковић
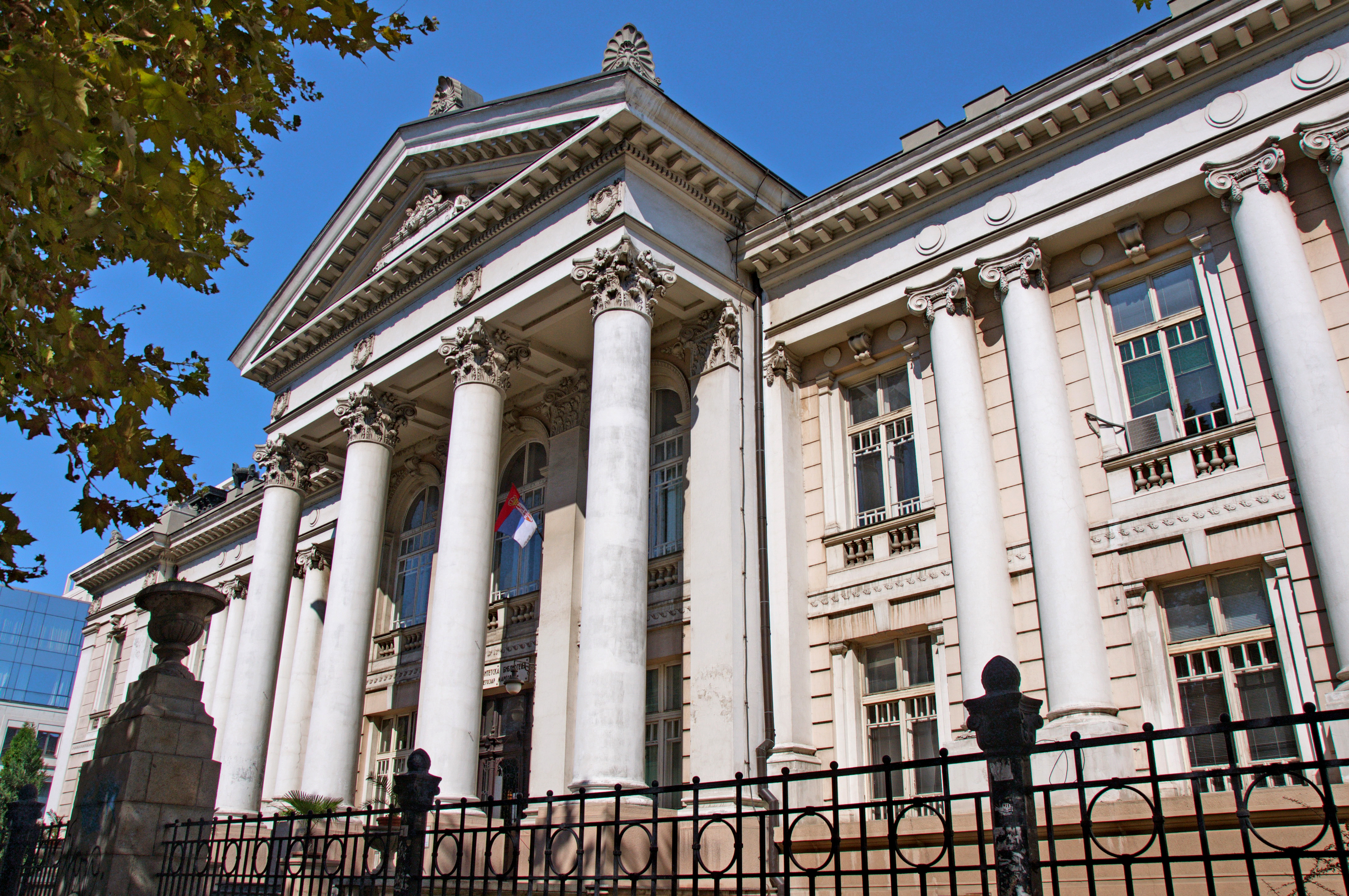
- Façade of the library
- 44°48′22.13″N 20°28′29.24″E
- Location: Belgrade, Serbia
- Type: Academic library
- Established: 1844 (182 years ago)

Collection
- Items collected: Books, journals, newspapers, magazines, maps, prints and manuscripts
- Size: 1.5 million items (approx.)

Access and use
- Population served: University of Belgrade and worldwide
- Members: University of Belgrade and other groups on application

Other information
- Director: prof. dr Aleksandar Jerkov
- Website: www.unilib.bg.ac.rs

The University Library Svetozar Marković (Serbian: Универзитетска библиотека Светозар Марковић, romanized: Univerzitetska biblioteka Svetozar Marković) is the main library in the University of Belgrade system, named after Svetozar Marković, a Serbian political activist in the 19th century. It is located on King Alexander Boulevard, close to the Faculty of Law and adjacent to the Faculties of Civil Engineering, Electrical Engineering, and Architecture. Serves the educational and scientific needs of students, academics, and scientists. Library Day is 24 May, a day commemorating Slavic educators St. Cyril and Methodius. At the founding of the library, the collection contained 57,254 publications consisting of monographs and serials. Today, the library contains roughly 1,700,000 publications.

The library holdings include seminal works from all scientific fields, a large collection of local and foreign encyclopedias, bibliographies, dictionaries, professional and scientific journals, university publications, textbooks, and a significant collection of doctoral dissertations. The library also includes a collection of rare objects where manuscripts, old printed books, old magazines and newspapers, archival collections, as well as a collection of maps, doctoral, master's and specialist works are housed. In particular in the library's manuscript collection, there are several invaluable Cyrillic and oriental books.

== History ==
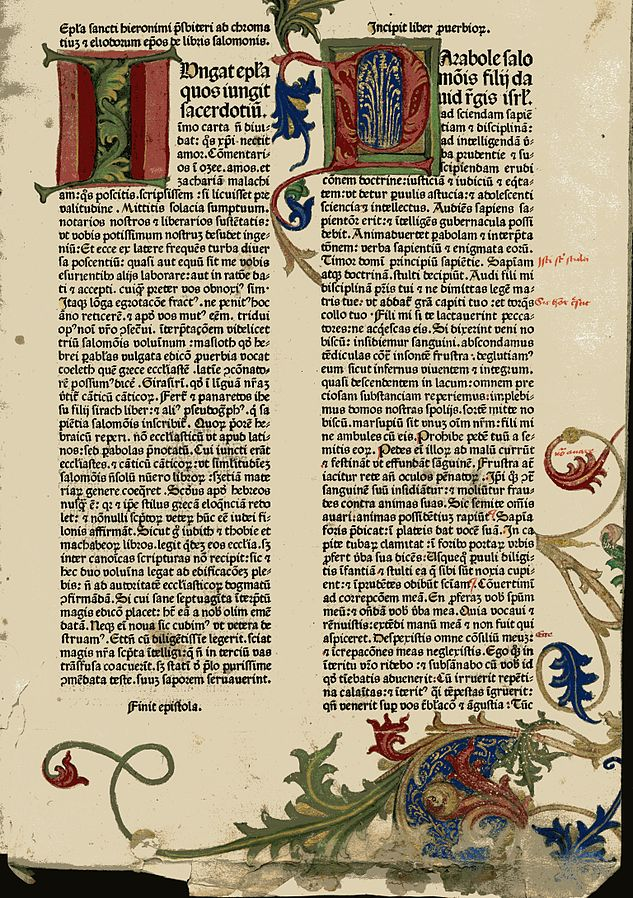
Old manuscripts

The University Library, one of the largest research libraries in the Balkans serving the educational and research needs of its academic population, originates from the library of the Lyceum of the Principality of Serbia. Established in 1838, the Lyceum was considered the best school in Serbia at the time and had a library that was used by its professors and students as well as by students of the Belgrade Higher School. Its funds were made up of gifts from local and foreign donors, and a sample copy of the Principality of Serbia. According to the provisions for establishing the Lyceum, the librarian had to be one of its teachers, the first of which was Dr. Janko Šafarik (1814–1876), philologist and professor of history. The Library in 1850 had 927 volumes.

Belgrade Lyceum of the Principality of Serbia was converted into the Belgrade Higher School by the law of 24 September 1863. The school's library kept only professional publications, while other publications were handed over to the National Library. When in 1905 the Belgrade Higher School became the university library, the library was disbanded. The funds, according to scientific fields, were divided by the appropriate faculty seminars. The most valuable part of the collection went to the library of Serbian seminars. Soon it was realized that the university required a general scientific library, but the outbreak of World War I delayed its establishment. Part of this fund was received after establishing the University Library.

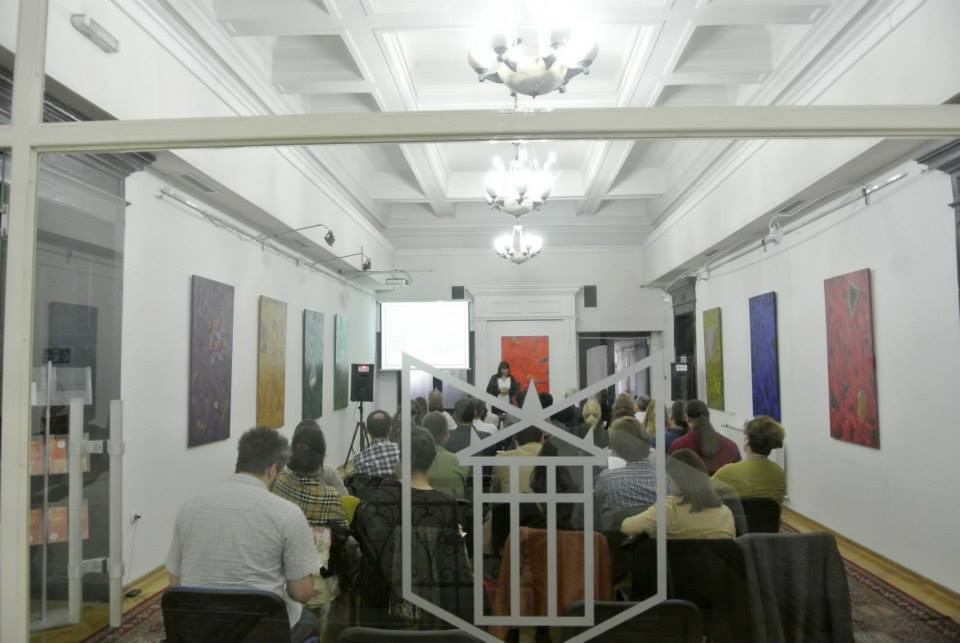
Art center in the Library

After the war, because of the great suffering of Serbian libraries, from abroad books began to arrive in large numbers to the address of the University Library, although she was only established since January 1921. Since the proposal for a decision of the Faculty of Philosophy, adopted by the University Senate, came from professor Pavle Popović who was appointed head of the Commission for the establishment of the University Library. Shortly thereafter, in May 1921, professor Uros Džonić was appointed trustee of the University Library, who was temporarily given an office at the Faculty of Philosophy.

On the initiative of Serbian delegates in Washington, D.C., Dr. Slavko Grujić, Carnegie Endowment for International Peace, who had already built a series of libraries in the world, approved a $100,000 gift to the Serbian government to build and equip a library in Belgrade. After World War I, Belgrade was one of three "front-line" cities, badly damaged in the war, which were given a Carnegie Library; the other two were Reims in France (which received a city library) and Leuven in Belgium (which received a university library). Belgrade's university library is the only Carnegie library in Central and Eastern Europe. Professor Slobodan Jovanović, former Rector of the university, managed personal commitment to the material means increase by government loans, in order to build a larger library, to meet the needs of the university. The city of Belgrade donated land, and the project was designed by university professors, architects Dragutin Đordjević and Nikola Nestorović. So was built the first and then the only building in Serbia purpose-built as a library.

The library in a new building was officially opened on St. Cyril and Methodius, 24 May 1926. Professor Uroš Džonić remained the Administrator until the beginning of the Second World War. In this work, Džonić was assisted by a committee whose president was professor Dr. Pavle Popović. The main task of this institution was that "as an independent university institution helps cultivate the science and in the capacity of research libraries serve not only students and faculty of Belgrade University, but also to all those involved in science." During World War II, under German occupation, the library did not work with the audience, and part of the building was occupied by the German army. Through the efforts of the staff of the library, its collections are still preserved. After liberation, the trustee was Milica Prodanović, former librarian of the University Library. To celebrate the centenary of the birth of Svetozar Marković in 1946, this institution received its present name of the University Library "Svetozar Marković".

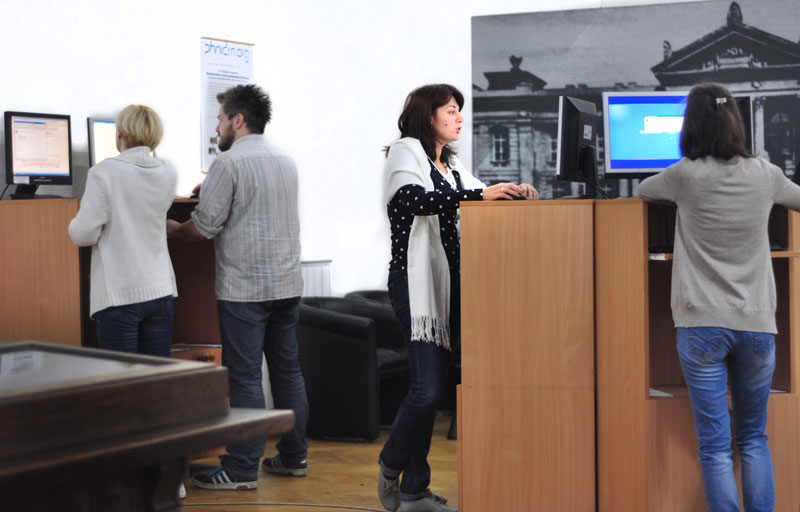
Hall of the library

In the period after the Second World War began the application of modern methods in the organization and processing of funds. A public professional directory was formed, in collaboration with the National Library of Serbia made a rule book for cataloging by the Association of Librarians of Serbia, which marked the beginning of equalization processing of library materials in the library of Serbia. Contacts were established with university and national libraries in the country and abroad. It also embarked on an aggressive work-sharing and interlibrary loan publications. A service for information was formed and cooperation with the universities, seminaries, institutes and other libraries of the University of Belgrade was expanded.

== Department of Scientific Information and education ==
Department for Scientific Information was transformed in 2008 into the Department of scientific information and education. This section traces the development of the system of scientific information and communication, browsing databases from all scientific fields. The main activity of the department is information literacy, particularly undergraduate and graduate students, preparing materials for different types of education tailored to specific user groups, work on continuous professional development, professional organization of librarians of university libraries in Serbia, academic libraries as well as library research institutes and institutions. The department prepares informants, guides and other informational materials about the library, preparing informational materials for the library website; engaged in the research and analysis within the field of information science, in accordance with the requirements and needs of universities and other users; collaborating on the development of library and information systems and scientific and technological information on universities in Serbia and in the system of coordinated procurement publications in print and electronic form; developing international cooperation.

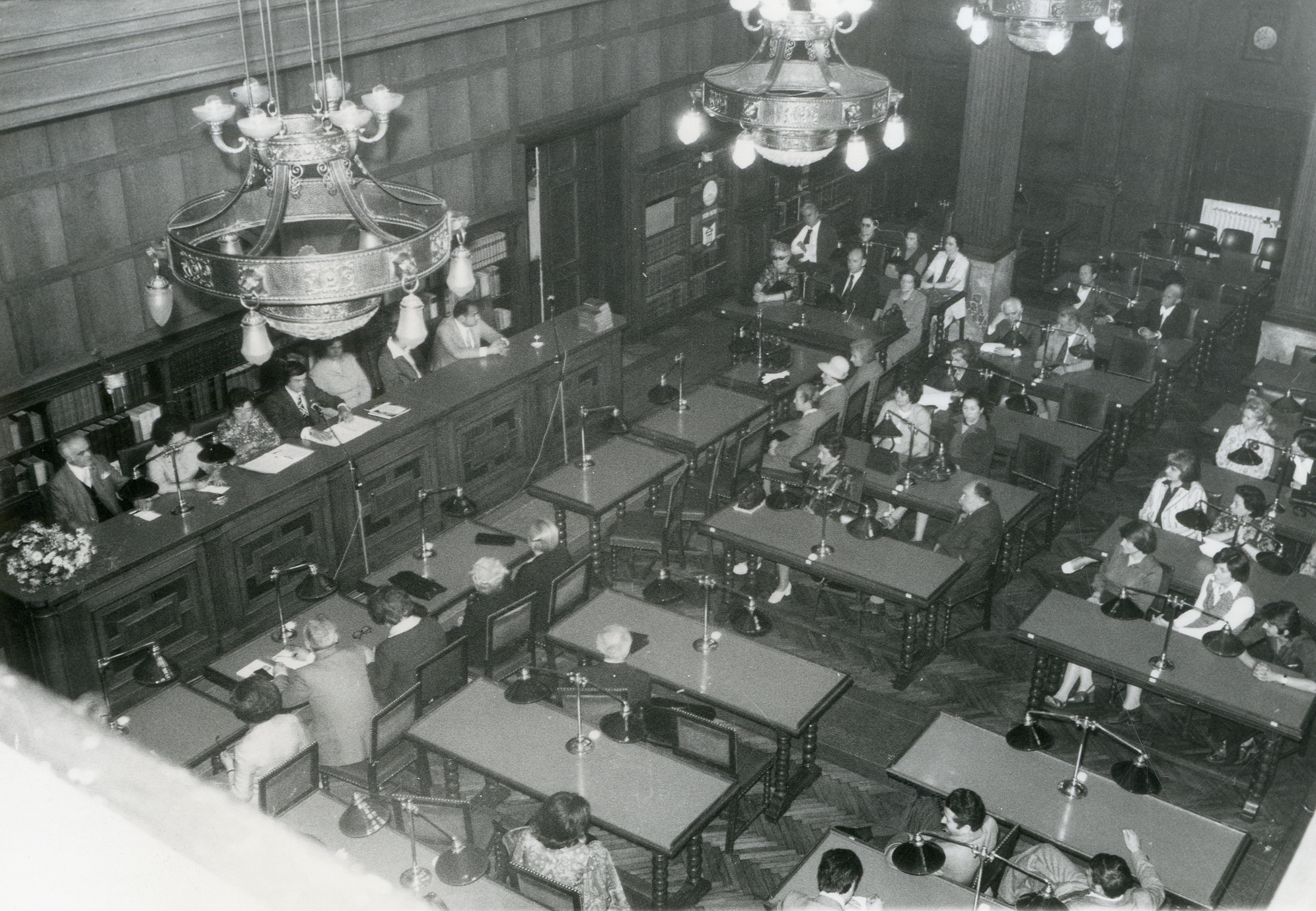
Reading Room

The Library has developed an educational program that organizes and implements department for scientific information and education, and library specialists from other departments. As a parent institution organizes special workshops for librarians, faculty, and research institutions. Particular attention is paid to the education of young researchers at master's and doctoral studies. Education is organized in the library, as well as abroad, at universities and institutes, members of the University of Belgrade, but also in universities and research institutions throughout Serbia. Thanks to this, the number of downloaded articles from electronic services available through CoBSON-a (Serbian Library Consortium for Coordinated Acquisition) each year is increasing, and the number of examined and partially downloaded e-books. Educational programs are varied and adapted to the learners.

The library organizes lectures by prominent international scholars and professionals dedicated to the scientific community of Serbia and librarians academic library network. Organized by the Library, in collaboration with other institutions of the University of Belgrade, has been held for more than 20 of these lectures via video link or live, with speakers from the EU, the US and the region.

=== Education ===
Department of Scientific Information and education by 2002 trained individual users, but has since started an organized training users in the form of group training such as presentations, lectures, interactive workshops and so on. The first group training were within the TEMPUS project, the target population consisted of academic librarians in the organization of the Community of Libraries of the University of Serbia. Within the Community over the years have been organized various lectures and workshops on the themes established by the interest and needs of the user, and from 2014 to maintain accredited course "Information Literacy in Libraries: commercial and non-commercial electronic information sources," in accordance with the Regulations of the Ministry of culture and Information of the Republic of Serbia that contribute to the evaluation of the librarian, and thus the improvement of the profession. The establishment CoBSON one of the most important activities of the department were a number of presentations and lectures are held at most colleges and institutes of the University of Belgrade as well as institutions throughout the country.

Most of the presentations and lectures are available on the website of the University Library.

=== Guides for scientific field – LibGuides ===
LibGuides is a type of multimedia, interactive web guide to all scientific fields. What was formerly called the reference links are in a much clearer, more organized, meaningful and attractive way to achieve this library guides.

It is a web service that enables authorized users, librarians, without prior knowledge of web design to successfully and easily create, organize and update Web pages. The main objective of this is to provide in one place access to reliable electronic sources – commercial and those in open access. For each scientific discipline, in addition to texts, images, video recordings, are available and useful links to associations, conferences and other current information. LibGuides uses about 50,000 librarians in over 3,700 libraries worldwide. Created about 300,000 guides. Also, this guide allows users to download already existing guides from all over the community and work together more librarians in making guides.

=== Interlibrary loan ===
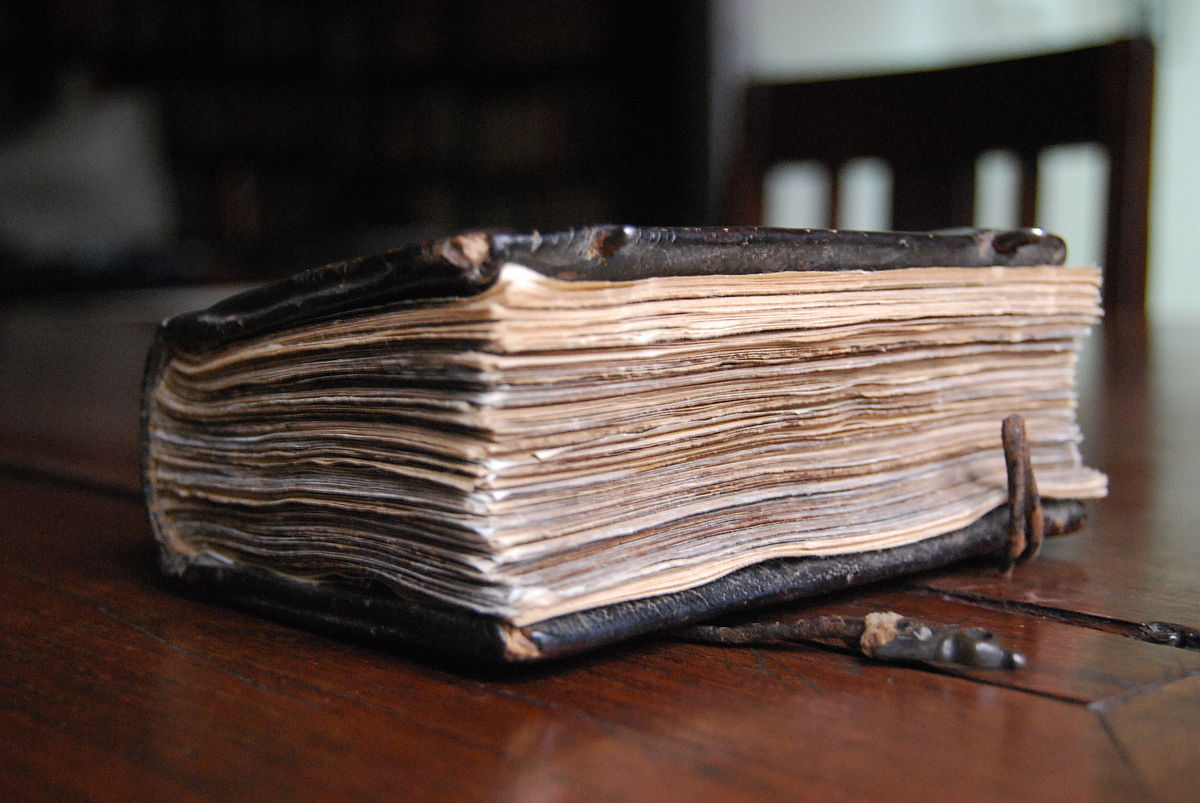
An example of a rare book from library collection

The tendency in the development of modern librarianship is that the prospective user of a library in the country, at the same time become a user of all public libraries in the world.

The purpose of local interlibrary loan identified primarily in meeting the demands and needs of the user – library, both for information and for their sources in different fields of science, culture and art. In addition, it is necessary to understand the needs and structure of the user to be in line with the dynamics of providing information, which again must be the result of more efficient activities of the department that deals with interlibrary loans. Changes in the expectations, requirements and user type affected the interlibrary loan in the University Library "Svetozar Marković", which represents the connection between classical or physical and digital lending, reflecting both the dual nature of the modern library.

== Catalogs ==
=== Electronic catalog ===
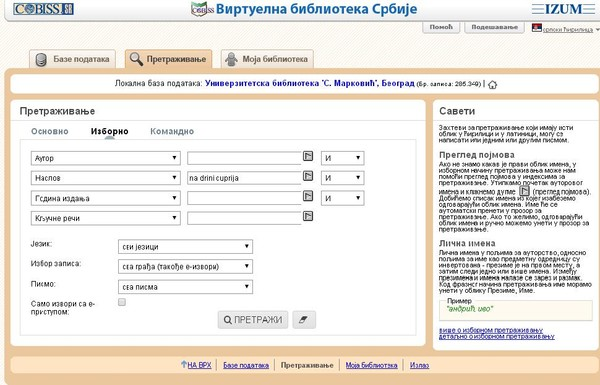
Electronic catalog

The University Library "Svetozar Marković" in Belgrade can be searched by publication of an electronic catalog (OPAC).OPAS is an acronym of English words Online Public Access Catalog. OPAC at the library is used since 1989 along with card catalogs. Since 1998 card catalog is no longer updated, but new data is entered only in the electronic catalog. The loan was automated. It is available 24 hours a day via the Internet.

There are three types of search an electronic catalog: basic, intermediate and advanced.

=== Card catalog ===
Author catalog of books from the fund of the University Library "Svetozar Marković" is divided into:

- Alphabetical catalog of books from the fund of the University Library "Svetozar Marković" until 1963
- Alphabetical catalog of books from the fund of the University Library "Svetozar Marković" from 1963 to 1998 (Cyrillic and Latin editions)
- Cyrillian catalog of books from the fund of the University Library "Svetozar Marković" until 1963
- Professional catalog of books divided by areas of expertise from the fund of the University Library "Svetozar Marković"
- Catalog doctoral dissertation is divided by areas of expertise from the fund of the University Library "Svetozar Marković"

Special catalogs are:

- Central catalog of books Belgrade University – since 1930
- Alphabetical and chronological catalog of old and rare books
- Library catalog of House of Vojislav Jovanović Marambo
- Catalogue illustrations in old books and periodicals
- Catalog archives and pseudonyms

== Legacies of the University Library ==
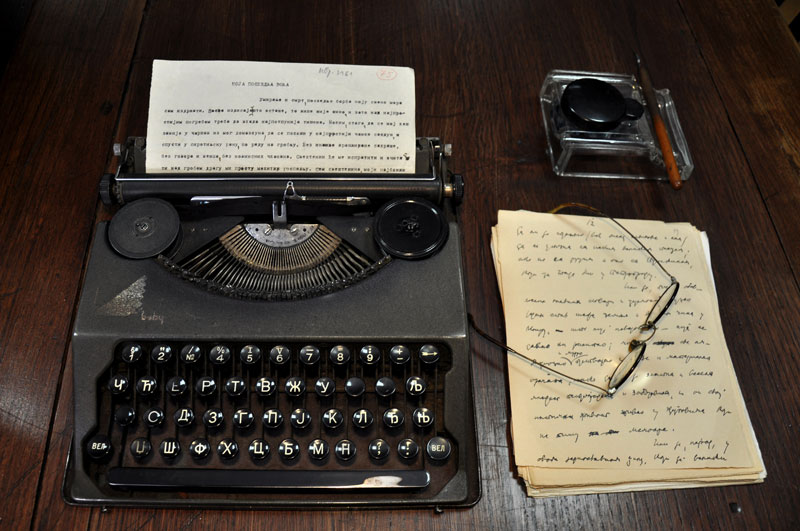
Stationery of Isidora Sekulić

The University Library in its funds has over 30 separate libraries (legacies), which are stored as separate entities. They are very different in size and importance, but they are a great value, both in terms of content, as well as testimony about the characters to whom they belonged.

Among these, the libraries that have a special value are: Library of Joca Vujić, one of the richest libraries of the Serbian national and cultural history and literature, which contains mostly books from the 18th and 19th centuries, as well as very valuable manuscripts, documents and letters. Donated in 1932. Library of Gideon Dunđerski is in fact a library of famous Serbian collector of old books, bibliophile, Petar Stojadinovic from Novi Sad. These are mostly from the history and literature of the Serbian people. The library is significant to the study of Serbian national and cultural history. Donated in 1929. Library of Miroslav Premru obtained from the Ministry of Foreign Affairs in 1927. Contains old and rare books, sources for the history and literature of the Renaissance and the Reformation. Library of Dimitrije Mirtinović, who lived and died in London, contains literature in philosophy, ethnology, anthropology, and Oriental art. The library was bequeathed to the University Library in 1956 and received Isidora Sekulić Library that contains books on literature and literary criticism, as well as manuscripts. The legacy consists of paintings, furniture and personal belongings. Memorial room is located in the reading room of the Department of rarities.

The full list of the legacies is:

- The Library of Petar Budmani
- The Library of dr Svetozar Marković
- The Library of Miroslav Premru
- The Library of Oto Karmin
- The Library of Hajnrik Kristensen
- The Library of Gedeon Dunđerski
- The Library of Luka Ćelović
- The Library of Božidar Karađorđević
- Carnegie's Library
- The Library of Dimitrije Ruvarac
- The Library of Joca Vujić
- The Library of Slobodan J. Jovanović
- The Library of Branimir Ćosić
- The Library of Jovan Aleksijević
- The Library of Živojin Simić
- The Library of Stojan Novaković
- The Library of Aleksandar Stojanović
- The Library of Manojlo Nikolić
- The Library of Rudolf Sardelić
- The Library of Dimitrije Mitrinović
- The Library of Isidora Sekulić
- The Library of Aleksandar Belić
- The Library of Vojislav Jovanović – Marambo
- The Library of Momčilo Milošević
- The Library of Mihajlo Pupin
- The Library of Radoslav Perović
- The Library of Vojin Milić
- The Library of Miroljub Todorović – the legacy of signalism

== Gallery ==
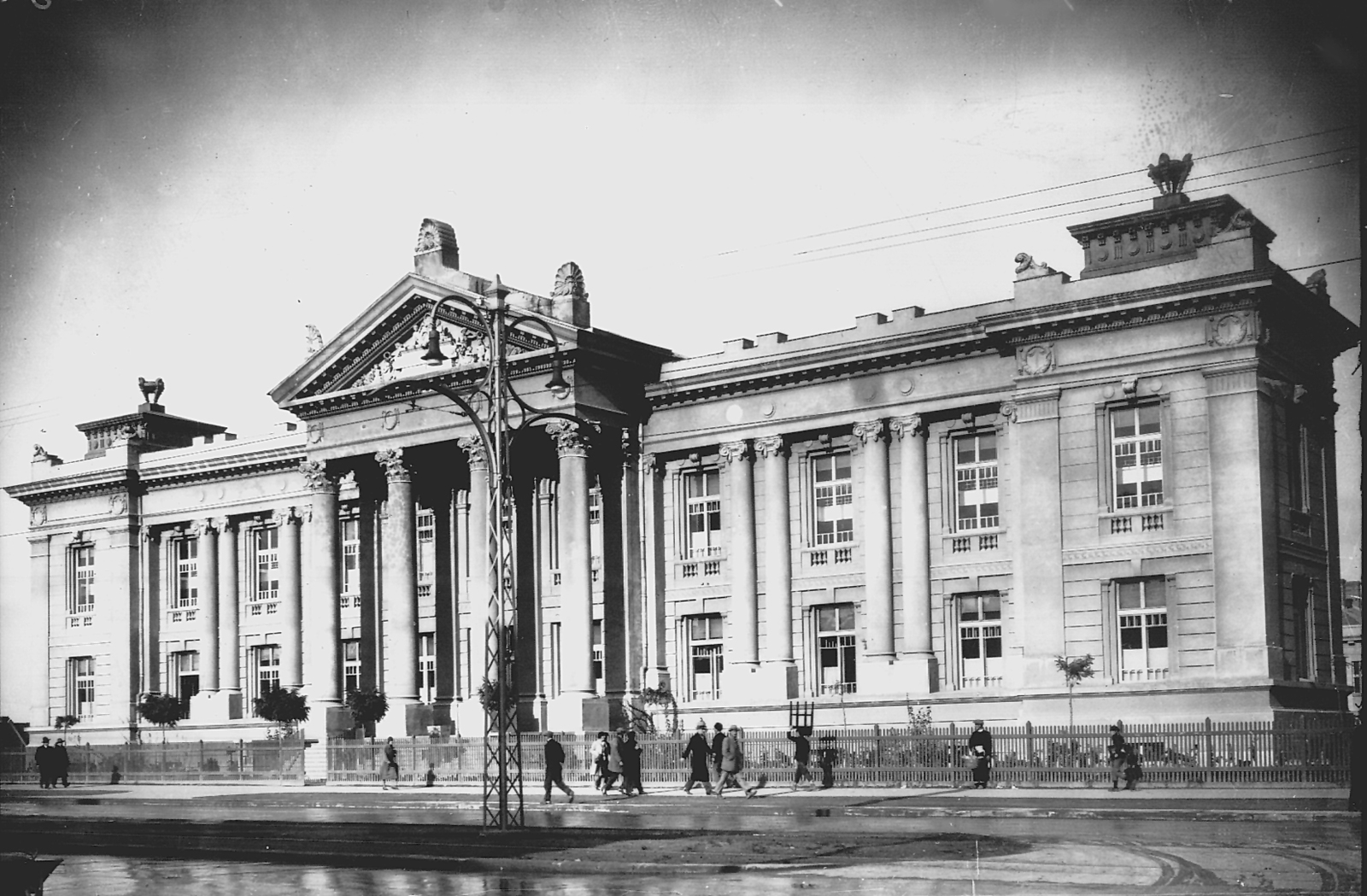
Former look of the Library

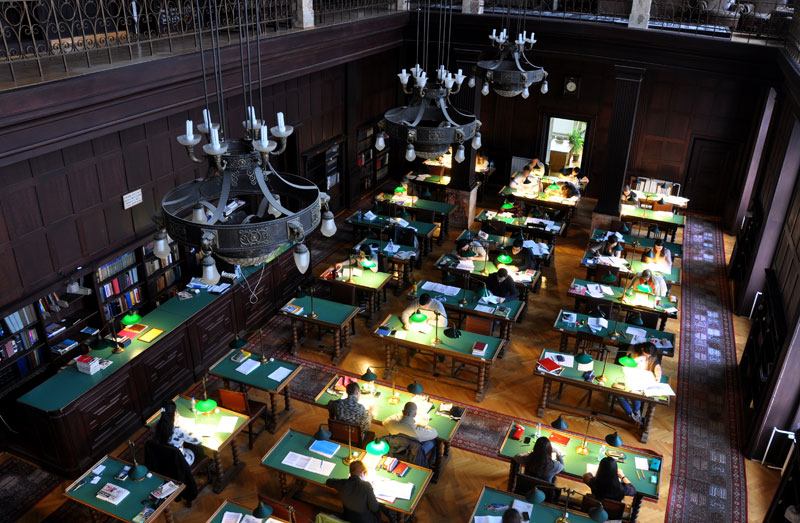
Reading room

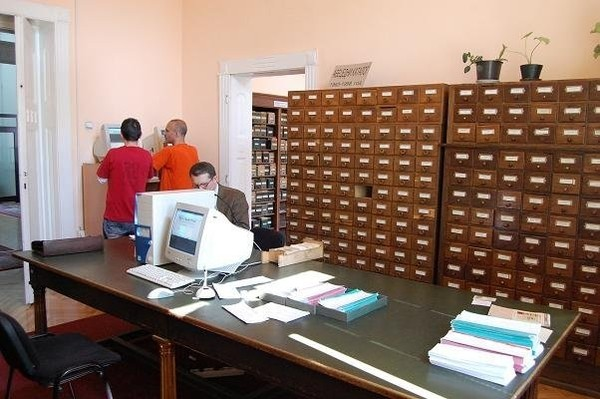
Card catalogue section

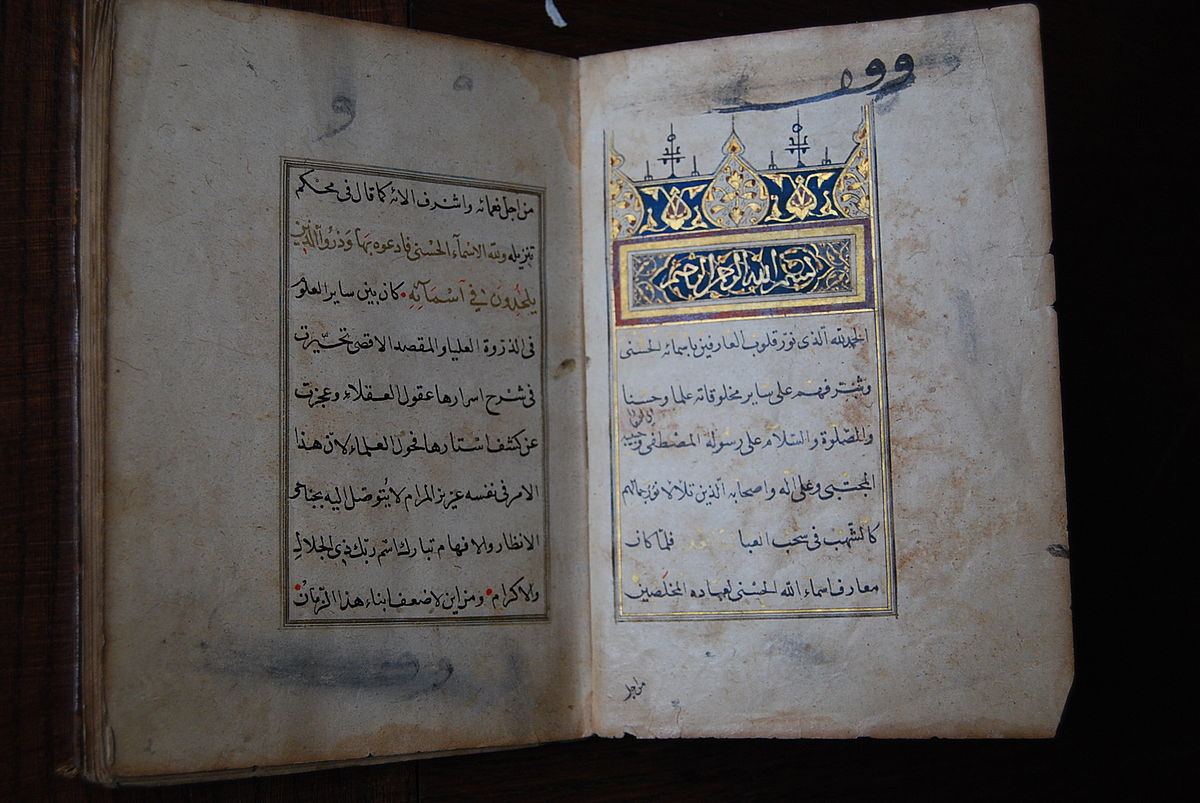
A Qur’an manuscript

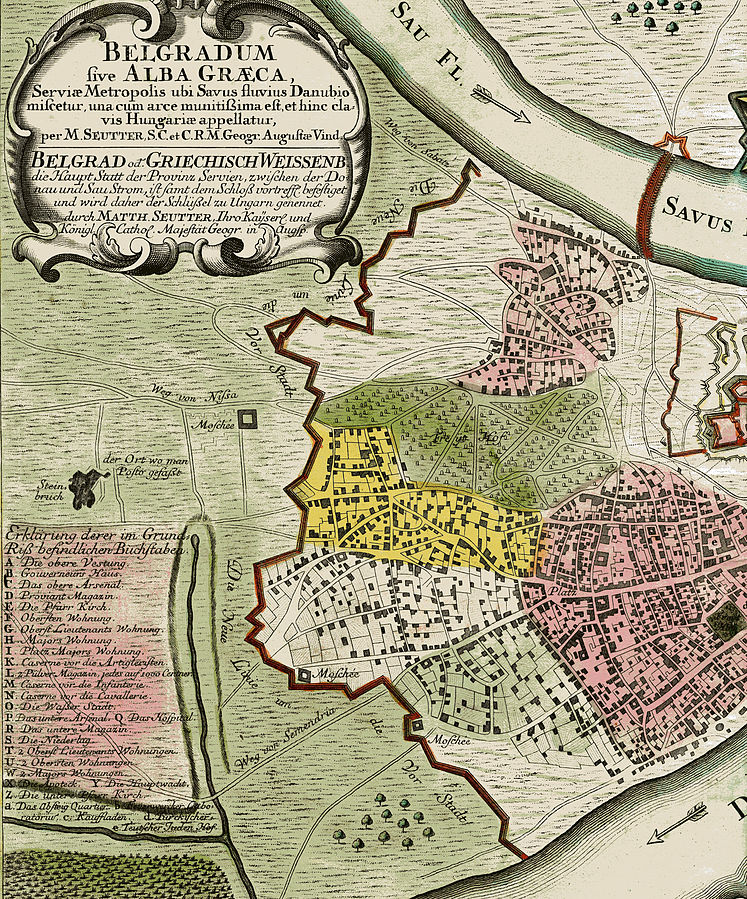
Old map of Belgrade

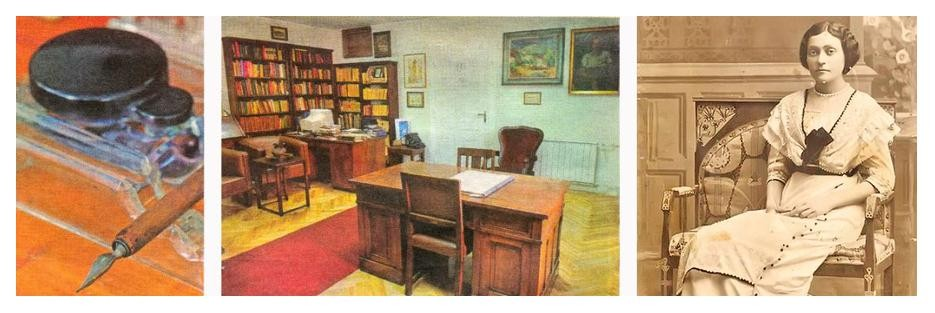
Memorial room of Isidora Sekulić

== Literature ==
- Dr Stela Filipi-Matutinović :„Научне информације у Србији“ .
- Dr Radosav Marković : "Универзитетска библиотека у Београду (1921–1945)", (1968), Institute for Textbooks of Socialist Republic of Serbia, Belgrade, Serbia.
- A Guide to the "Svetozar Marković" Univerzitety Library, (2001), Univerzitety Library "Svetozar Marković", Belgrade, Serbia.
- Uros Džonić : Изградња Универзитетске библиотеке у Београду : 1919–1925 : дневници Уроша Џонића, (2011), Универзитетска библиотека "Светозар Марковић", Belgrade, Serbia.
- Website of the University Library "Svetozar Marković", Belgrade, Retrieved 7 November 2014.
- University Library "Svetozar Marković" – Treasury of knowledge, Retrieved 7 November 2014.
- University Library "Svetozar Marković" – Education Retrieved 7 November 2014.
- University Library "Svetozar Marković" – LibGuides – Guides of scientific fields Retrieved 7 November 2014.
- Aleksandra Pavlović, Antonić Sanja, Šujica Vesna, Krinulović Oja, Kavaja-Stanišić Dejana: Department for Scientific Information of University Library "Svetozar Marković" in Belgrade – respond to customer demands, (2008), Librarian, 50 (3/4), 111–122nd.
- Aleksandra Popovic, Antonić Sanja, Stolić Dragana: Education, digital repositories and open access, (2012), Digitization of Cultural and Scientific Heritage, University Repositories and Distance Learning: a thematic anthology in four books. Vol. 2, ctr. 323–334.
- Basic search – guide.
- Electoral search – guide.

== See also ==
- Andrew Carnegie
- Carnegie library
- List of Carnegie libraries in Europe
- List of libraries in Serbia
