= Joca Vujić =

Serbian socialite

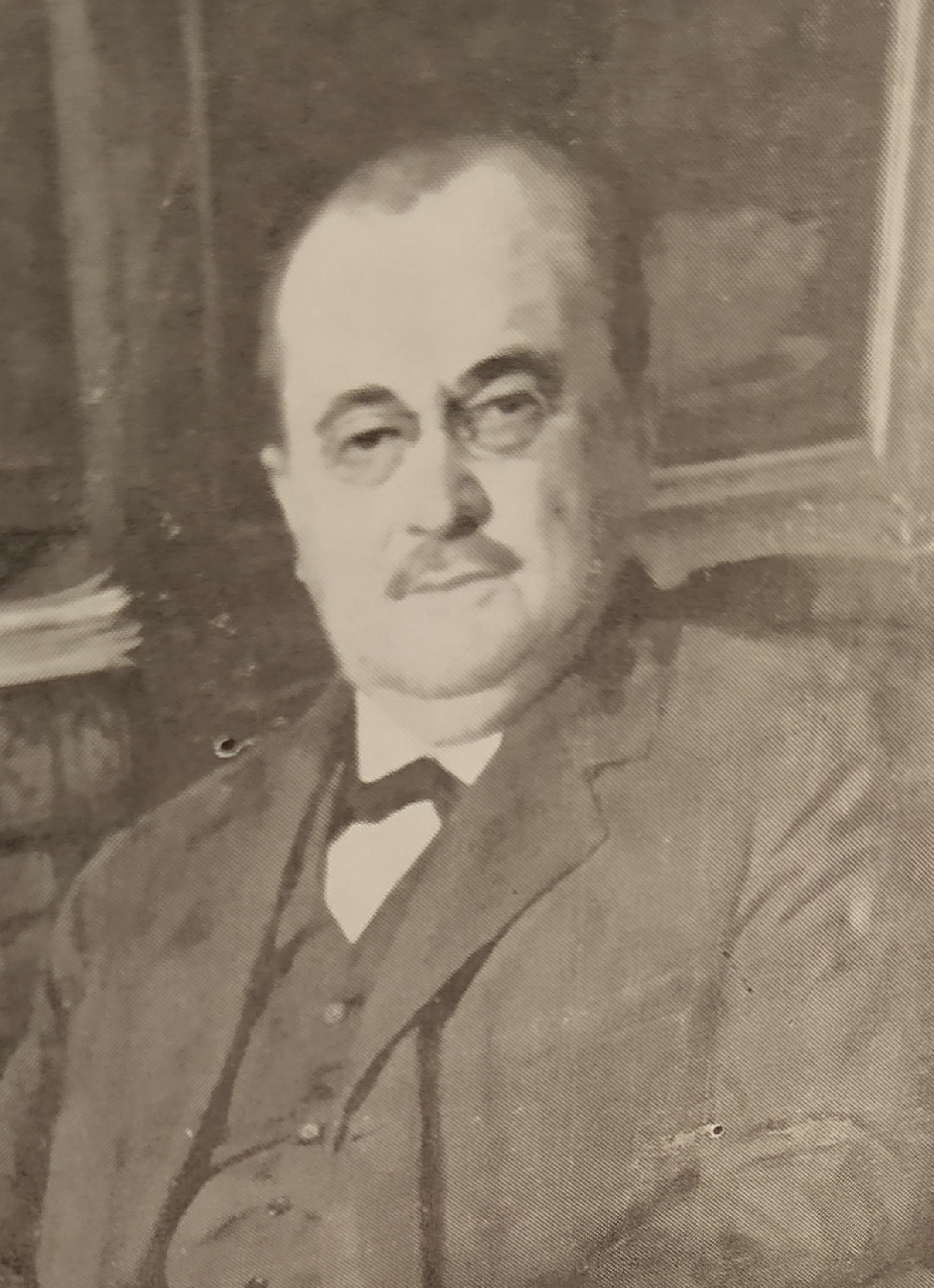
Portrait of Joca Vujić

Jovan Joca Vujić OBO, OJK, OSvS (13 July 1863 – 12 September 1934) was a Serbian art collector, socialite, bibliophile and landowner. Vujić was the owner of the first private Serbian museum, and his legacy can be found in the City Museum of Senta, Matica srpska, Belgrade University Library and Adligat.

== Biography ==
=== Childhood and schooling ===
Joca Vujić was born on 1 July 1863, according to the old calendar, and on 13 July, according to the new calendar, in the city of Senta in the Austrian Empire, as the youngest of six children of Sava Vujić, a lawyer and landowner, and mother Terezija, née Mudrić. His name at birth was Jovan, but during the years of his life, he accepted his nickname "Joca" as a name.

From an early age, he had a penchant for learning, and the loss of his mother in early childhood, when he was seven, had a great influence on his early independence. He had outstanding results in his education, especially standing out in the bill. He was educated first in a Serbian primary school in his hometown, and since he lived in a multinational environment, after four grades of Serbian school, he enrolled in a Hungarian primary school to learn the Hungarian language. In 1873, he enrolled in the civic high school in Senta and finished three classes there, learning German and Latin. He finished the fourth grade of high school with a publicist in Szeged. In addition to mathematics, he also studied religious studies diligently and excelled in that. He later considered his religious teacher Isa Zubin to be responsible for his good education and upbringing.

In September 1877, he enrolled in the grammar school in Požun (today's Bratislava). Joca Vujić wrote in his diaries about the influence this city left on him: "Požun has left a mark on my future life. There I learned about cultural, sober civic life, there I saw how people live in German civic families, there was no family life at all at our house in Senta. In Požun, I got the will to collect antiquities and the love for antiquities and the past, that Požun is in itself a museum of antiquities. In Požuna, my excessive Serbian nationalism developed in me, my love for Serbia and my unspoken aspiration to work and use all my strength for the cultural progress of my backward Serbia in every way". The awakening of nationalism in Joca was also influenced by important historical events of this period, such as the Nevesinje Uprising, the Serbian-Turkish War and the Russian-Turkish War.

=== Studies ===
He enrolled in 1881 at the Faculty of Philosophy of the University of Vienna. During his short stay in the Austrian capital, at one exhibition, he later met the famous painter Uroš Predić, with whom he remained a friend throughout his life, and who portrayed him in 1926. He continued his studies in Altenburg in 1882 at the Academy of Agriculture. This decision was influenced by the death of his sister Ida, because of which Joca decided to dedicate himself to economics and his father's property.

In addition to taking care of the property and studying, Joca Vujić travelled throughout Europe, and in 1883 he visited Belgrade for the first time, during a one-month tour of Serbia with his brother. This journey further deepened his love for antiquities, but also for the study of national history and the preservation of Serbian national treasures, and represents the beginnings of his long-term collecting. After the end of 1885, he returned to Senta, to a part of the family property that he received from his father.

=== Social engagement ===
From the moment he started to run the estate on his own, Joca also took part in the public life of Senta. At the age of only twenty-six, he was elected president of the Serbian Orthodox Church and School Municipality in Senta, and he remained in that position for twenty years. During the two decades, he significantly improved the church community, all church buildings were renovated, and special attention was paid to religious schools.

For years, he was a member of the Board of Directors of Matica Srpska and the Association for the Serbian Theater in Novi Sad, which he helped morally and financially. During his lifetime, he donated 50 paintings to the Matica Srpska, which later formed the basis for the opening of the Matica Srpska Gallery. During the First Balkan War in 1912, Joca Vujić donated goods and food worth 20,000 gold crowns to the Serbian army and the Red Cross. Later, because of this gesture, he was awarded the high Serbian decoration of the War Memorial from the Balkan Wars and the decoration of the Red Cross. He was the initiator of the founding of the Serbian Club in Sombor, which fought for a better life for Serbs in Bačka, even before the beginning of the First World War.

During the Great War, due to disagreements with the Hungarian authorities, he took refuge from Senta in Pest and remained there until the end of the war. After returning to his hometown, he was elected a delegate of the Senta and participated in the work of the Great National Assembly in Novi Sad, which in November 1918 declared the secession of Vojvodina from Austria-Hungary and unification with the Kingdom of Serbia. He was then elected a member of the delegation that was supposed to announce the decision to the Serbian government in Belgrade. In 1926, he was elected People's Deputy of Senta. For his deserving national work, Vujić was awarded several times, including the Orders of Saint Sava IV, III and II order, as well as the Orders of the Yugoslav Crown and the White Eagle.

=== Private life ===
Joca Vujić was married to Valerija Vince, with whom he had two children, Darinka and Jovana. At his request, out of love for his wife, the grandchildren were given the surname Vince. His son Jovan had three children - Ida, Vasilija and Darinka. The grandson of Vasilija Vince Vujić, with his wife Tanja Kragujević, founded the Joca Vujić Collection as part of the family legacy in the "Adligat" Association.

He died in Belgrade, on 31 August, according to the old calendar, or on 12 September, according to the new one, and he was buried three days later in Senta.

== Legacy ==
On several occasions during his life, Joca Vujić tried to transfer his rich museum treasury to Belgrade or Novi Sad and form a significant institution, in a separate building or house that he would acquire himself, but in those plans, he was repeatedly prevented by the then policy and agrarian laws. who did not allow such an endeavour of the individual at that time. His proposals, driven by the desire to bequeath the treasure he collected to his people and make it publicly available, were met with unacceptable conditions or rejected, and never materialised.

=== Library and archive of Joca Vujić in the University Library "Svetozar Marković" ===
After years of unsuccessful negotiations, Joca Vujić decided at the end of 1931 to bequeath his entire library and collection of archival material, except for items he considered not important for Serbian science and those he wanted to keep in Senta, to the University Library. Svetozar Markovic ”. He did that through a will, and the library and archives were transferred to Belgrade at the end of 1932. To this day, Vujić's collection is the most important collection of archival material in the Library, but despite its value, it is rarely used in scientific research.

Until the Second World War, the library was kept, under his name, in a special department, and later it was transferred to the general warehouse. In May 2012, the Joca Vujić Library was returned to a separate room of the University Library.

=== Joca Vujić's collection in the Association "Adligat" ===
Joca Vujić's collection in the Association for Culture, Art and International Cooperation "Adligat" in Belgrade was founded by Joca's grandson Vasilije Vince Vujić with his wife Tanja Kragujević, and is part of the family legacy of Tanja Kragujević and Vasilije Vince Vujić. The association was presented with a large number of important items that were previously part of the Joca Vujic Museum, including the belt of Princess Ksenija Petrovic Njegos, weapons used in the First Serbian Uprising, various documents from Joca Vujic's personal archive, such as decrees and more. The collection also includes two gold printed rings with the initials of Joca Vujić. One ring, in addition to the initials, also contains a symbol of justice, and the other is a ring with a gold frame and a ruby plate.

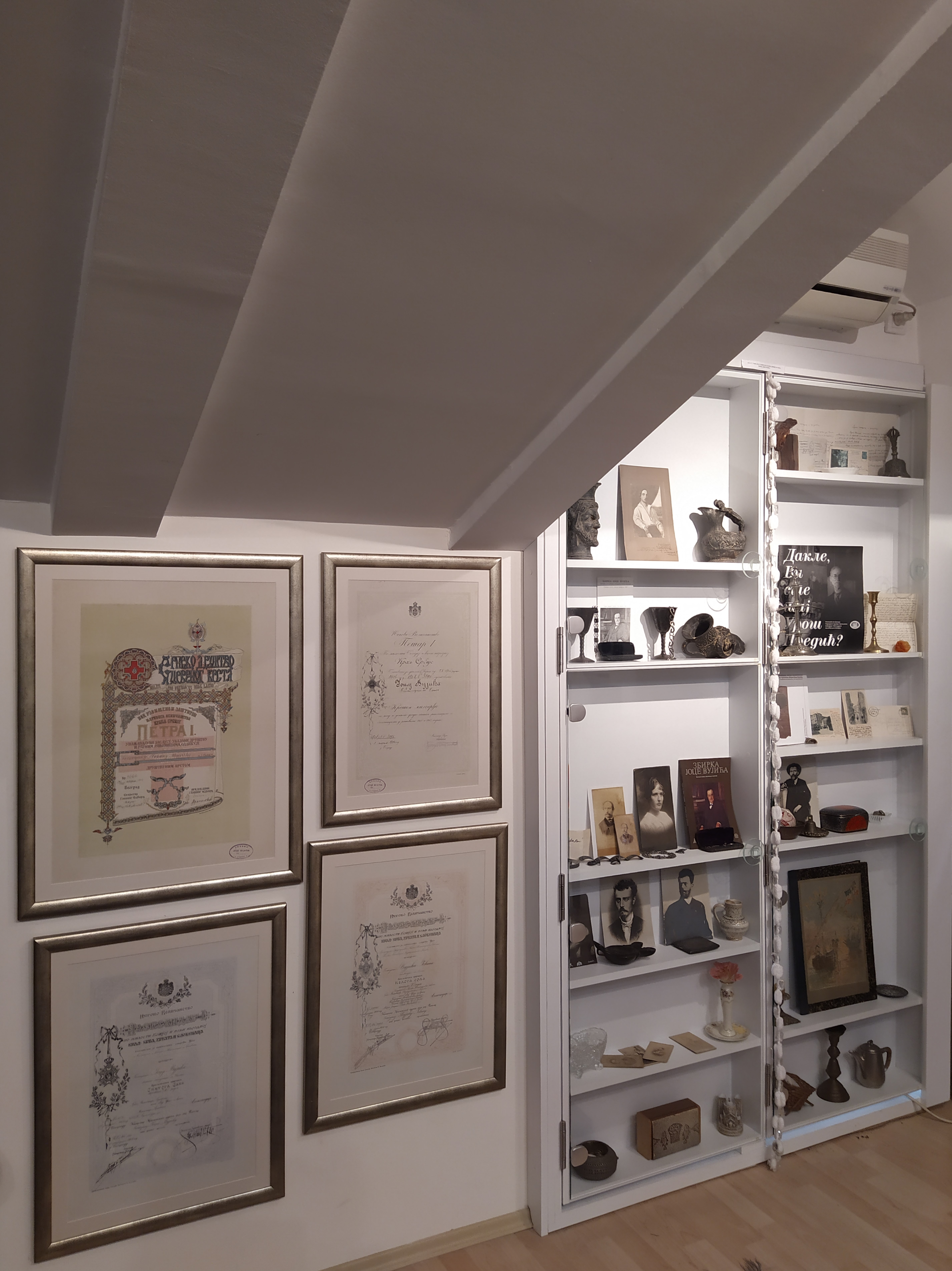
Joca Vujić's collection in the Association "Adligat"; on the left side of the charter on awarded orders to Joca Vujić, with the seal of his archive.

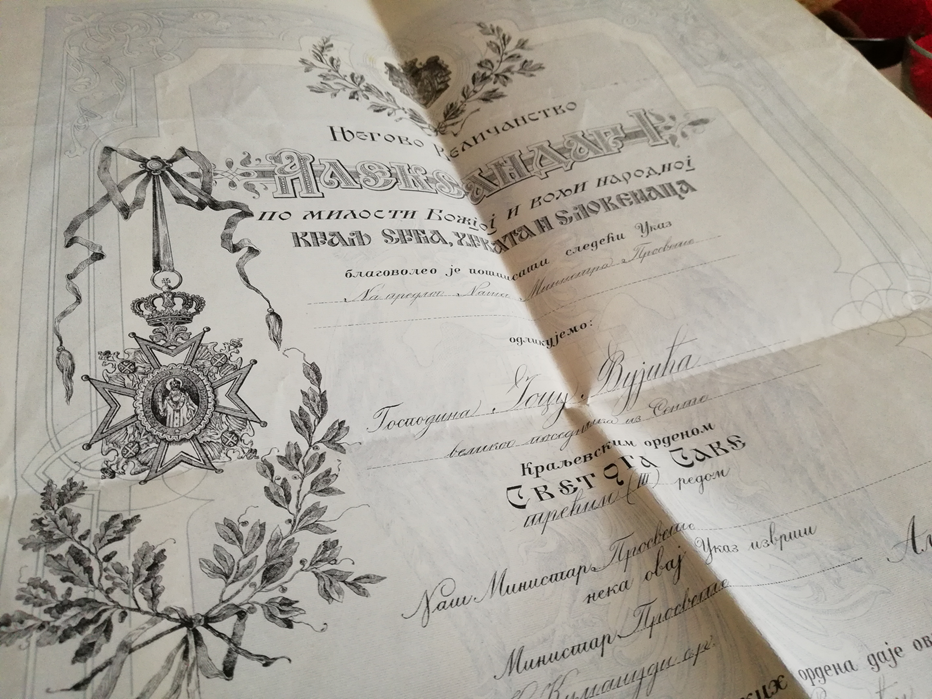
Charter on the decoration of Joca Vujić, the Royal Order of St. Sava of the third order, 1928.

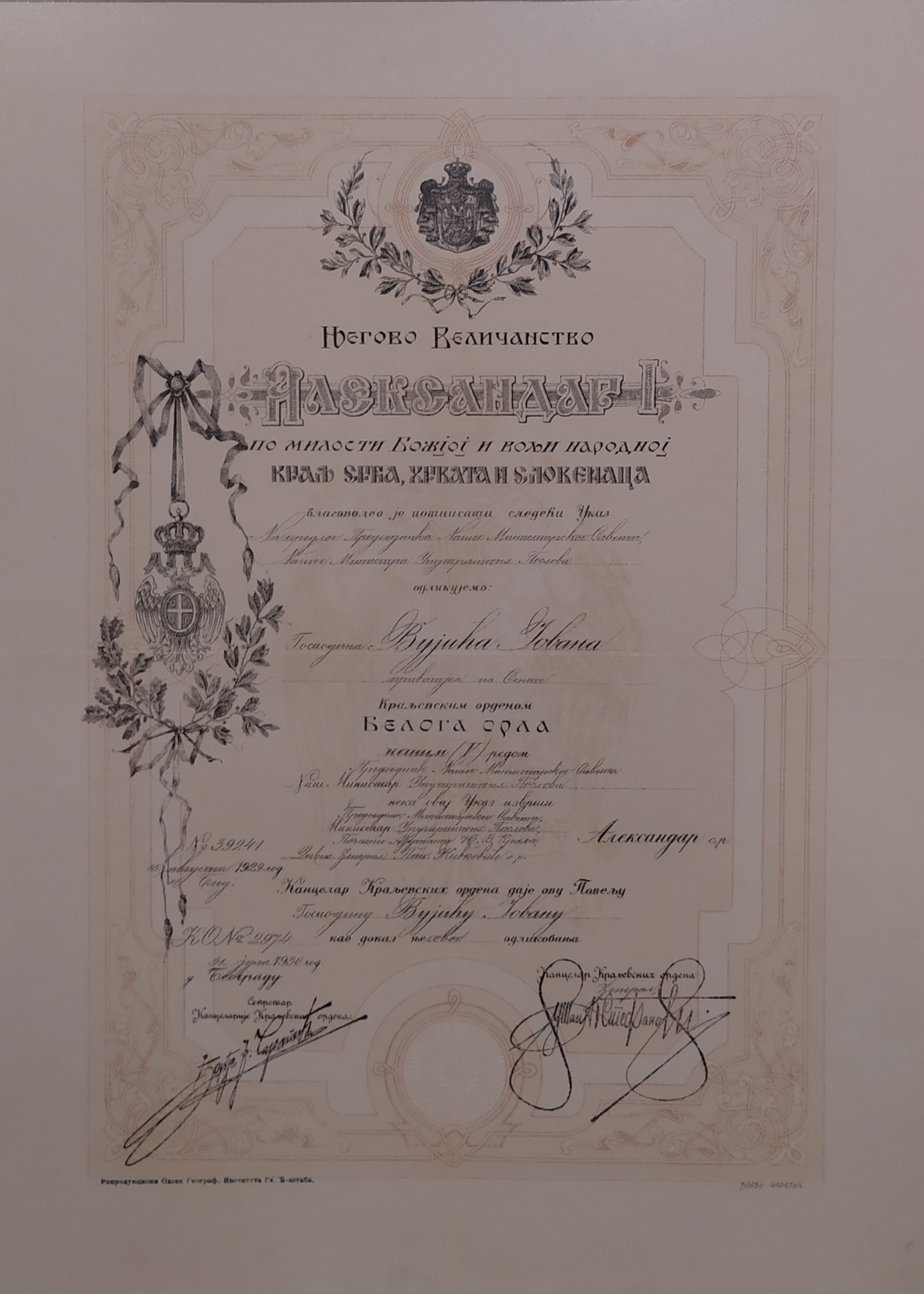
Charter of the Royal Order of the White Eagle Mr. Joce Vujić in 1929

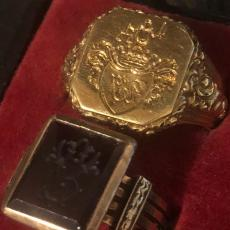
Gold printed rings by Joca Vujić with his initials

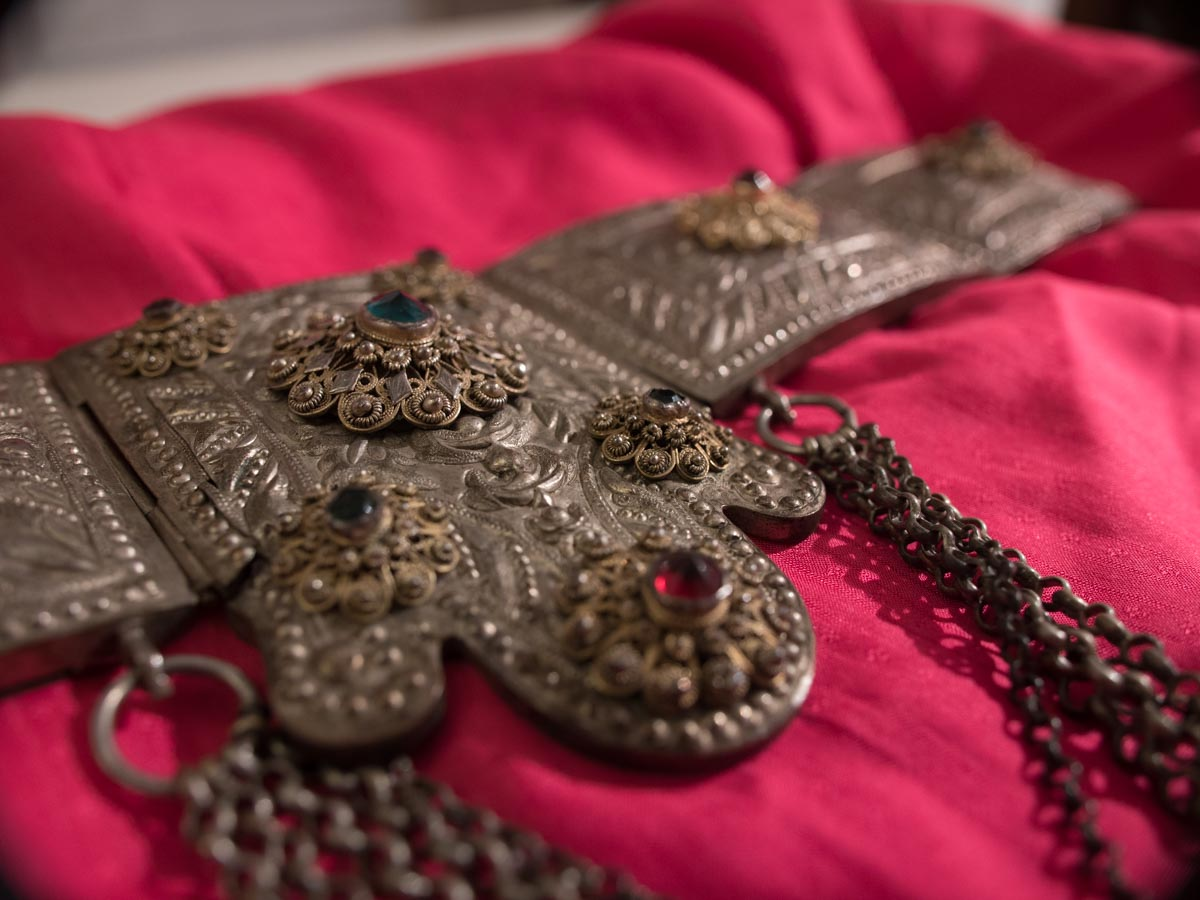
Silver filigree belt from the 19th century, by Princess Ksenija Petrović Njegoš

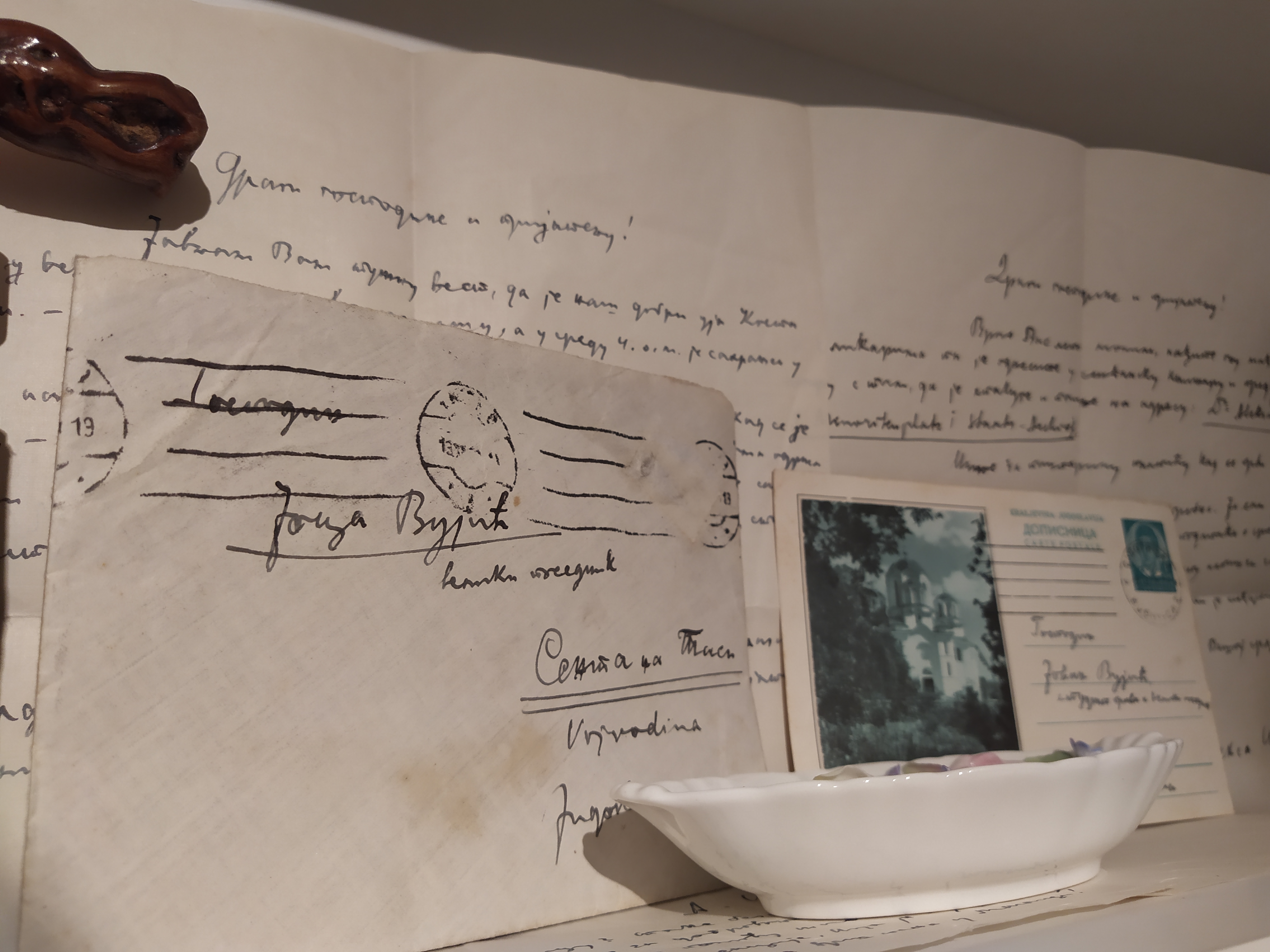
Letters from Joca Vujić

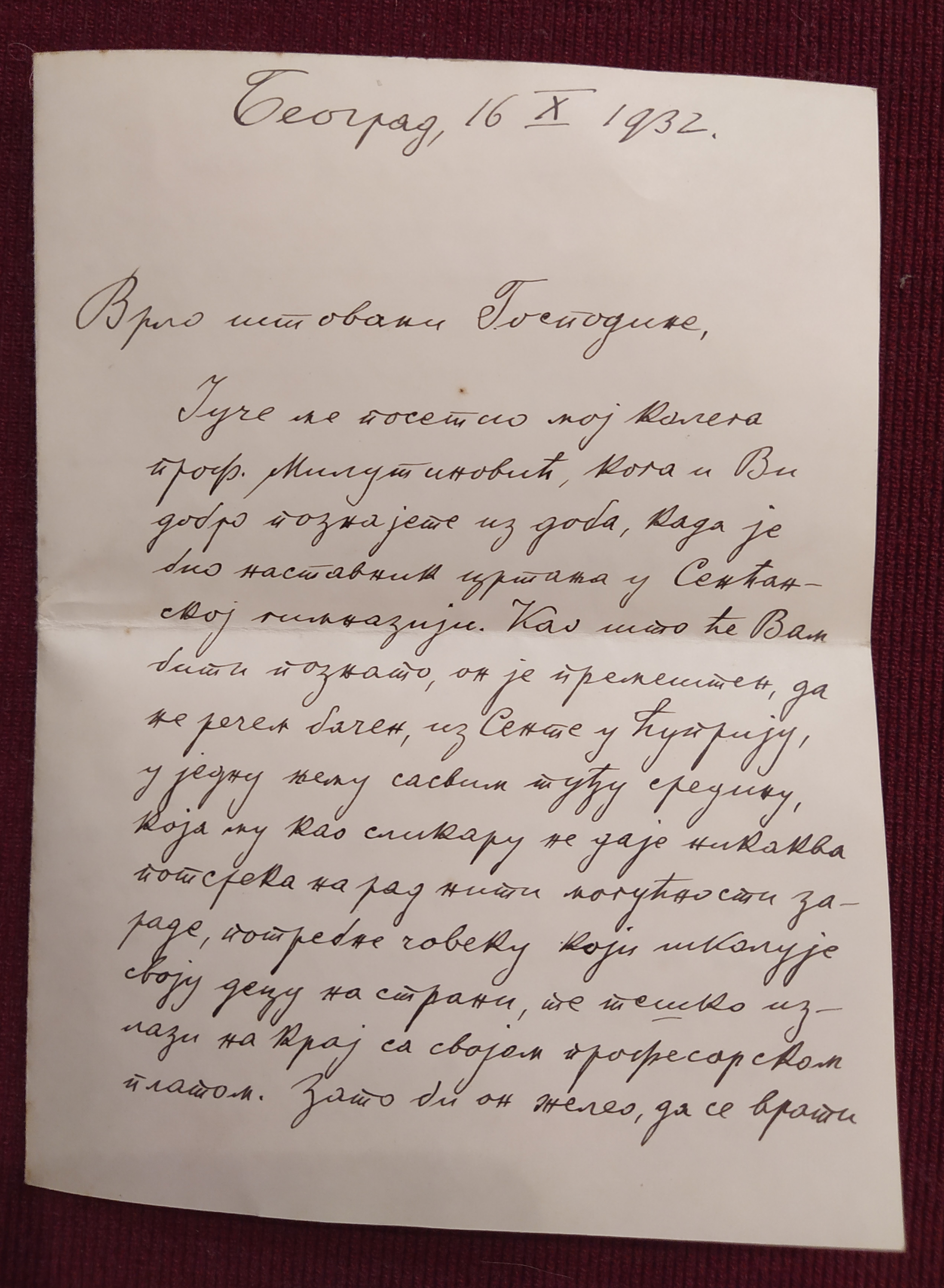
Letter from Uroš Predić sent to Joca in 1932, first page

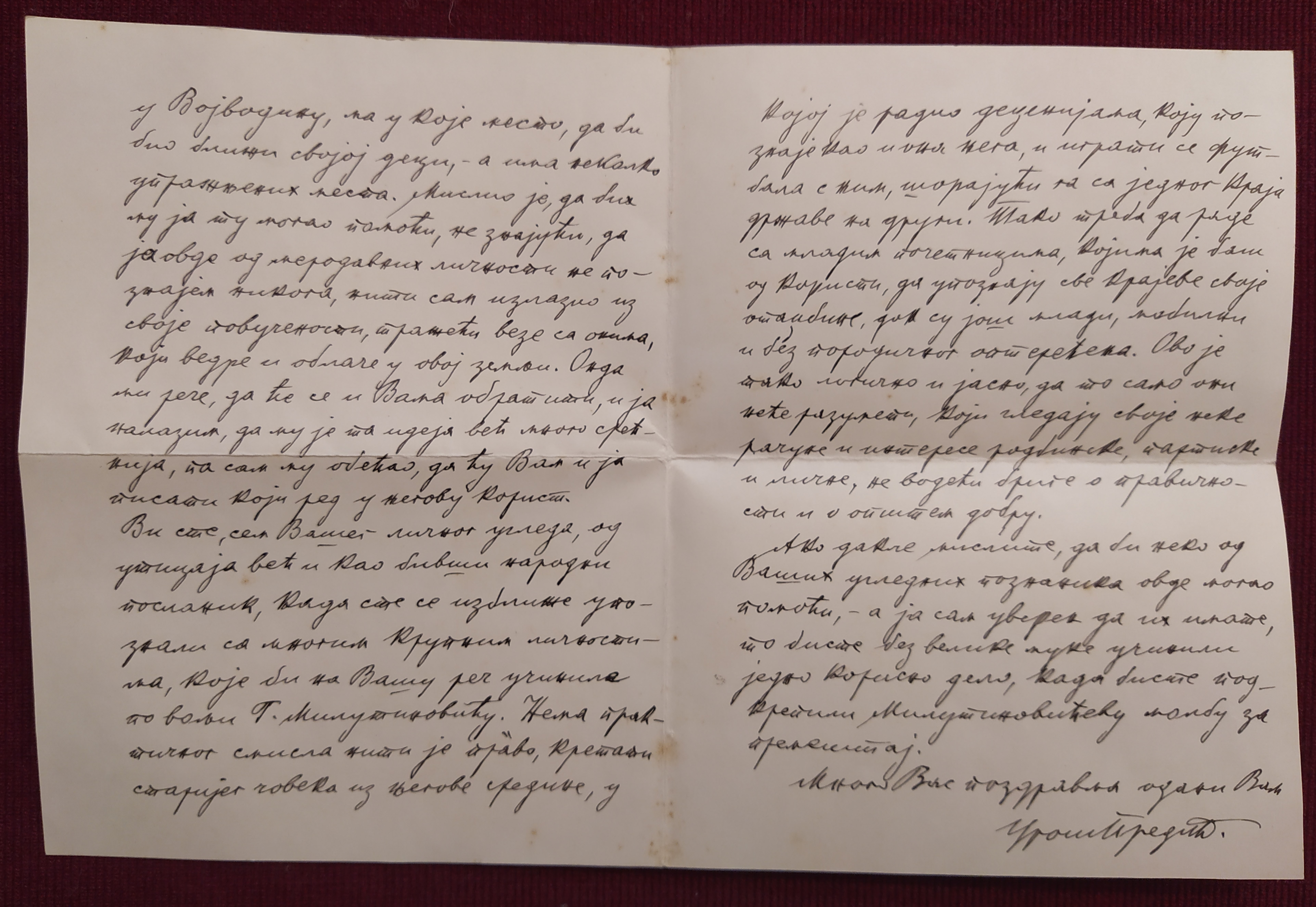
Letter from Uroš Predić, second and third pages

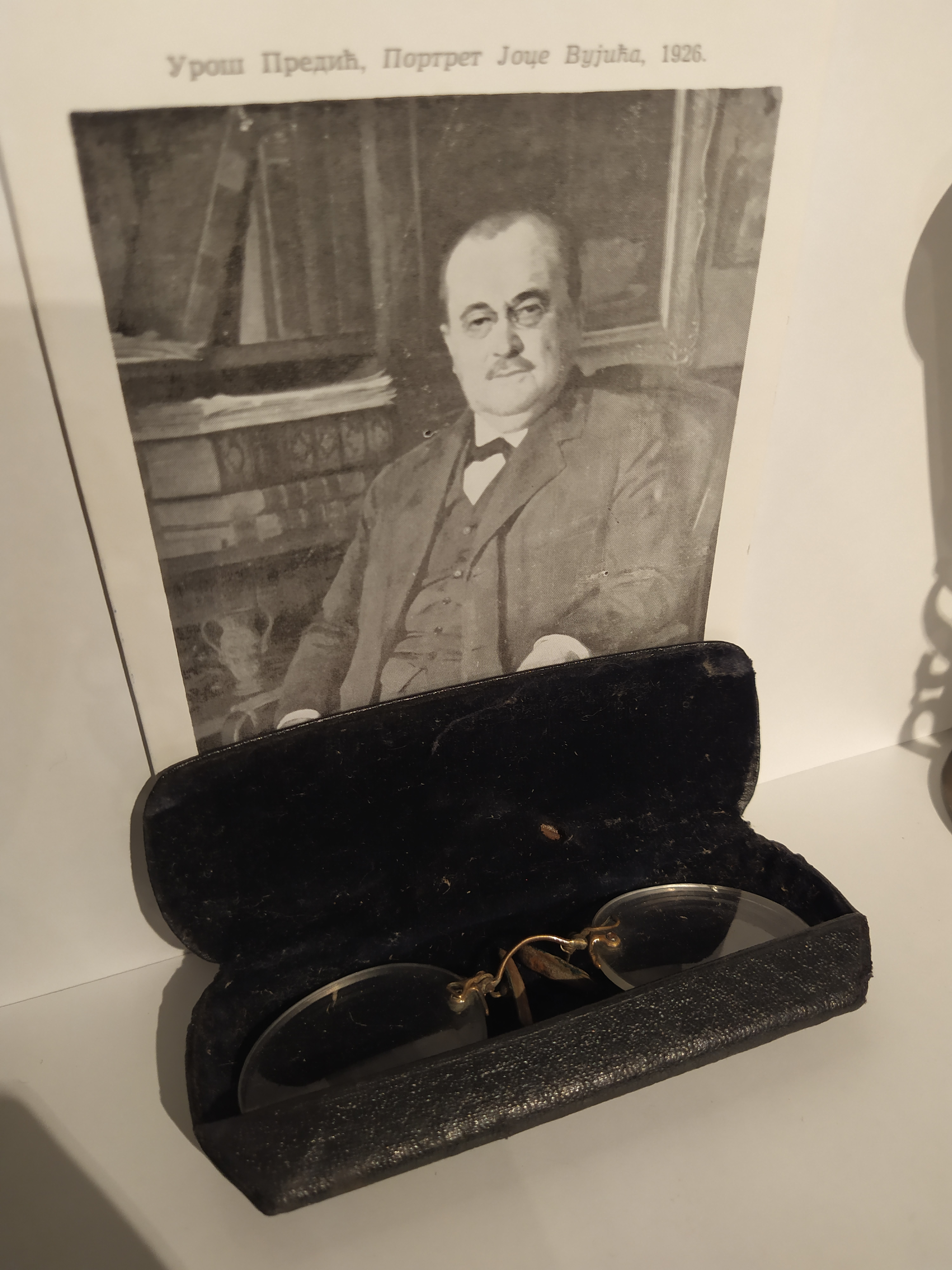
Joca's glasses that he wore while Predic portrayed him

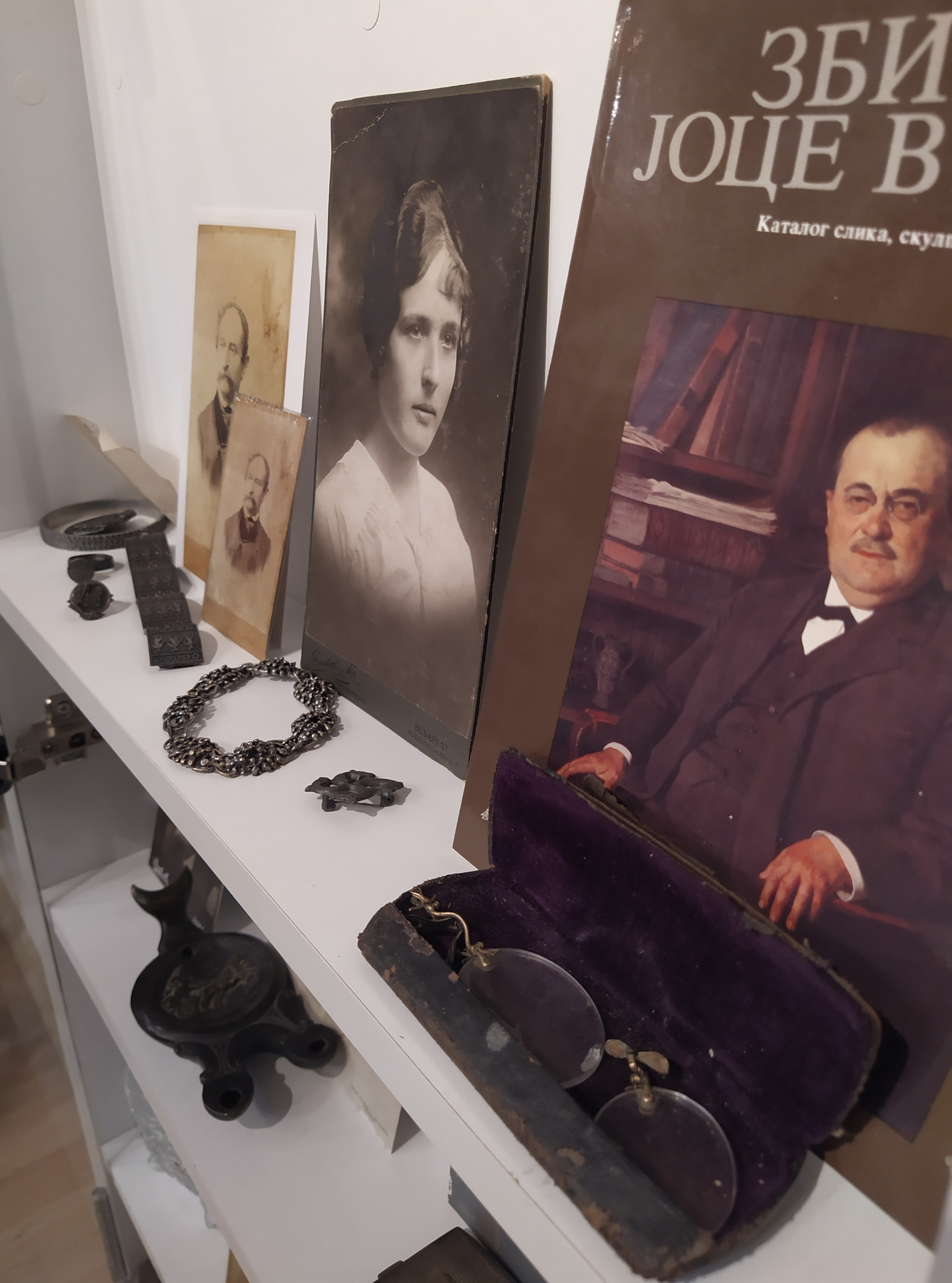
Part of the Collection in the Association, another Joca glasses

== Literature ==
- Library Catalogue (2012). Joca Vujić, a great benefactor of the University of Belgrade and the University Library (PDF). University Library "Svetozar Marković".
- Brzulović Stanisavljević, Tatjana (2015). Family correspondence of Prince Miloš Obrenović from the Archive Collection of Joca Vujić in the University Library "Svetozar Marković". University Library "Svetozar Marković". ISBN 978-86-7301-078-6. OCLC 1062289020.
