= Štitar, Serbia =

Štitar Штитар (Serbian)
- Village (Selo)
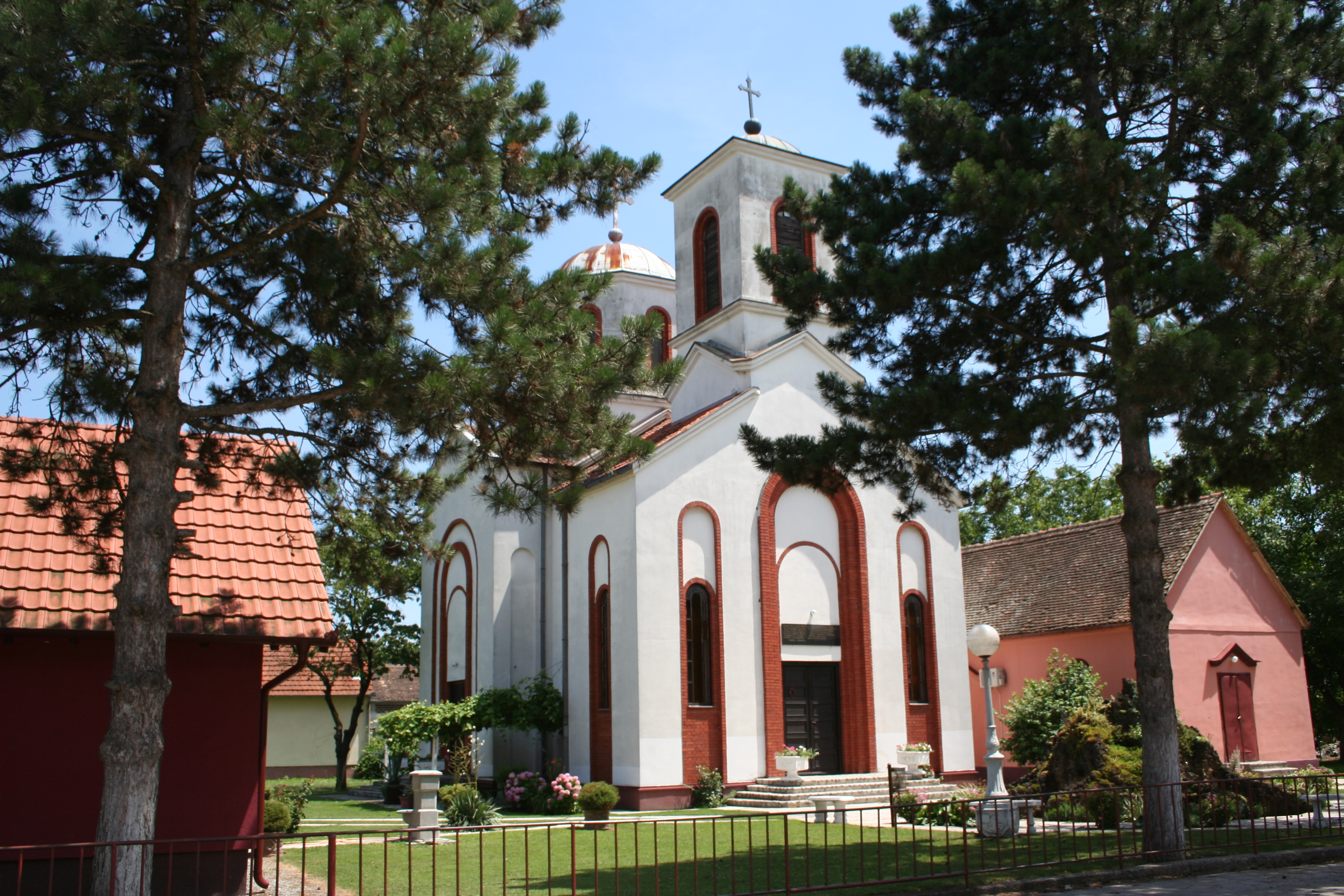

- Location within Serbia
- Coordinates: 44°47′N 19°36′E
- Country: Serbia
- Statistical Region: Šumadija and Western Serbia
- Region: Mačva
- District: Mačva District
- Municipality: Šabac
- Time zone: UTC+1 (CET)
  - Summer (DST): UTC+2 (CEST)

Štitar (Serbian Cyrillic: Штитар) is a village in Serbia, located around 9 km west from the town of Šabac, in Mačva District.

== Geography ==
Štitar lies is in the heart of Mačva, an alluvial fertile flatland between the rivers Drina and Sava. The area of today's village was until the 18th century covered with dense and virtually impassable forest, Kitog.

== History ==
By the end of 19th century, Štitar was populated by Serb refugees from outside of then-autonomous (and later independent) Serbia. The first group came from Montenegro in the 18th century, followed by others from Herzegovina, Bosnia, and parts of present-day Serbia that remained under Ottoman rule after the Second Serbian Uprising.

== Demographics ==
According to the 2002 census, the village has 2,355 inhabitants, mostly Serbs.

Population of Štitar 1948–2002
Year	Population
1948	1447
1953	1630
1961	1949
1971	2072
1981	2183
1991	2256
2002	2355

== Famous inhabitants ==
- Branimir Ćosić (1903–1934), Serbian writer and journalist
- Miroslav Đukić (born 1966), Serbian footballer and coach
- Olivera Marković (born 1992)
- Petar Dinić (born 1993), Serbian Web developer

== See also ==
- List of places in Serbia
- Mačva
