= Order of St. Sava =

Serbian decoration (1883–1945, 1985–)

Order of St. Sava Орден Светог Саве
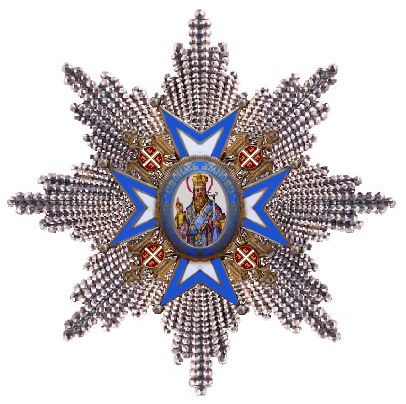
- Star of the order

Awarded by Kingdom of Serbia Kingdom of Yugoslavia House of Karađorđević Serbian Orthodox Church
- Type: State order (1883-1945); Dynastic order (since 1945); Ecclesiastical order (since 1985)
- Established: 23 January 1883
- Ribbon: White with Light Blue stripes on either side
- Criteria: Meritorious achievements in the arts, science, education and religion
- Classes: Knight Grand Cross; Grand Officer; Commander; Officer; Knight

Precedence
- Next (higher): Order of the Cross of Takovo (Kingdom of Serbia, 1883–1903); Order of the White Eagle (Kingdom of Serbia/Yugoslavia, 1903–1930); Order of the Yugoslav Crown (Kingdom of Yugoslavia, 1930–1945)
- The Ribbon of the Order

The Order of St. Sava (Serbian: Орден Светог Саве, romanized: Orden Svetog Save) is an ecclesiastic decoration conferred by the Serbian Orthodox Church and a dynastic order presented by the house of Karađorđević. It was previously a state order awarded by both the Kingdom of Serbia and the Kingdom of Serbs, Croats and Slovenes/Kingdom of Yugoslavia.

The state order was awarded to nationals and foreigners for meritorious achievements in the field of religion, education, science and the arts as well as for social and relief work. It was abolished in 1945 with the proclamation of the People’s Federal Republic of Yugoslavia and the end of the monarchy, while continuing as a dynastic order, with appointments currently made by Alexander, Crown Prince of Yugoslavia.

The ecclesiastic order is awarded to ecclesiastic and secular persons with special merits.

== History ==
The Order of Saint Sava was established by Milan I of Serbia, four years after the country gained independence and its transformation from a principality into a kingdom in March 1882. It was first awarded in January 1883 to recognised civilians for meritorious achievements benefitting the Church, the arts and sciences, the royal house, and the state. In 1914, a change to the Order was made to allow soldiers of the Serbian Army who served with distinction to receive the honour, as well as to women for war merit and humanity The Order of St. Sava was thereafter awarded by the kings of Serbia and its successor Yugoslavia until the abolition of the monarchy in 1945.

Five grades were awarded: Knight Grand Cross, Grand Officer, Commander, Officer and Knight.

The first grade was a jewel, worn with a sash over the shoulder and also with a breast star. The second and third-grade laureates wore the Order on a neckband. The fourth grade was a medal with a triangular suspension, a rosette attached to the ribbon above the medal. The fifth grade had a triangular suspension without a rosette. The medals of the fourth and fifth grades were worn on the breast. All white ribbons had two light blue stripes.

Several Order of St. Sava were bestowed to members of the British medical team during the First World War for "humanity and gallantry performed under fire", after their volunteer medical units followed the Serbian army during the Great Retreat through the mountains of Albania.

Since 1985, the Order has been awarded on the occasion of the 800th anniversary of St. Sava. This order is dedicated to ecclesiastic and secular persons, who have special merits for the Serbian Orthodox Church. According to the ordinance of the church, each person who received a medal of third grade may receive the medal of the higher grade as well as the first grade for future merits, provided that three years have passed at least since the previous award. The order is determined in three grades: the first one is white, the second red and the third blue coloured.

== Laureates ==
=== State order ===
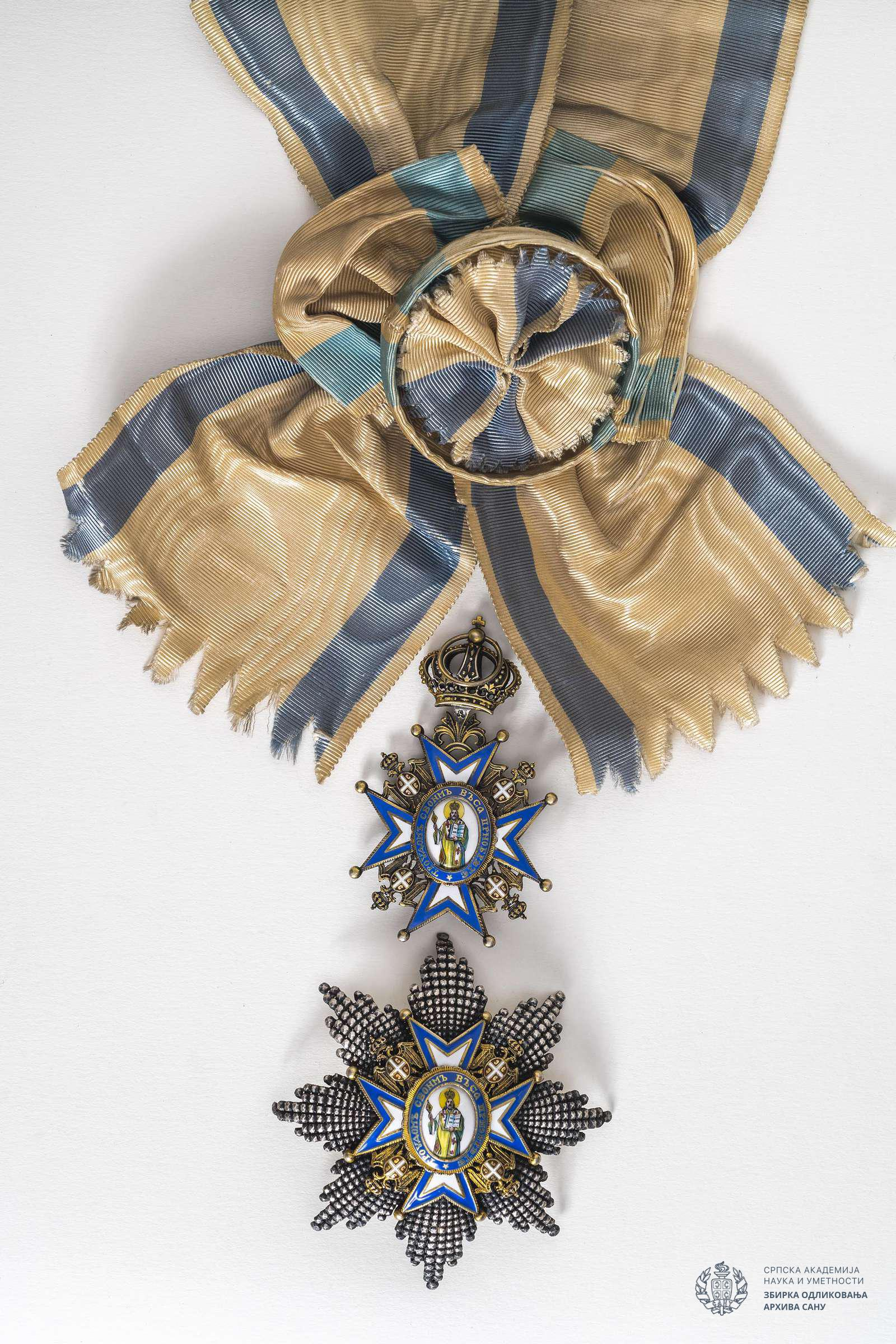
State order, 1st Grade

- Isaac Alcalay
- Xavier Arnozan, French physician, 1st Grade
- Agnes Bennett, New Zealand doctor
- Harry Woodburn Blaylock
- William Cavendish-Bentinck, 6th Duke of Portland
- Thomas Cook
- Randall Davidson
- Mateo García de los Reyes (1872–1936), Spanish Navy officer
- Mary E. Gladwin, English-born American Red Cross nurse
- Helen Hanson, British doctor, 2nd grade
- William Hunter, 2nd Grade 1915
- Queen Kapiolani of Hawaii, Hawaii 1883
- Helen Keller, 3rd Grade 1931
- Grand Duke Dmitry Konstantinovich of Russia
- Alois Jirásek, 1926
- Dominik Mandić, Herzegovinian Franciscan
- Dragoljub Mihailović, 25 January 1928
- Milutin Milanković
- Alojzije Mišić, 10 November 1923
- Peter Norman Nissen
- Nicholas Roerich, 1932
- Marie of Romania
- Jessie Scott, New Zealand doctor
- Nikola Tesla, 2nd Grade 1892
- Violetta Thurstan, English nurse, 1918
- Đorđe Vajfert (I grade)
- Amelia Peabody Tileston (third degree), American canteen worker, 1920
- Joca Vujić
- Dame Rebecca West, British author and journalist.
- Vladimir Rosing, Russian tenor and political activist, 5th Class, July 1922.

=== Ecclesiastical order ===
- Patriarch Alexy II, Patriarch of Moscow and all Russia
- Novak Đoković, 2011
- Aleksandr Karelin, 2013
- Emir Kusturica
- Patriarch Peter VII of Alexandria
- Vladimir Putin
- Alexander Isaevich Solzhenitsyn
- Rev. Marko B. Todorovich, 2015

== See also ==
- Ecclesiastical decoration
