= Branimir Ćosić =

Serbian writer and journalist

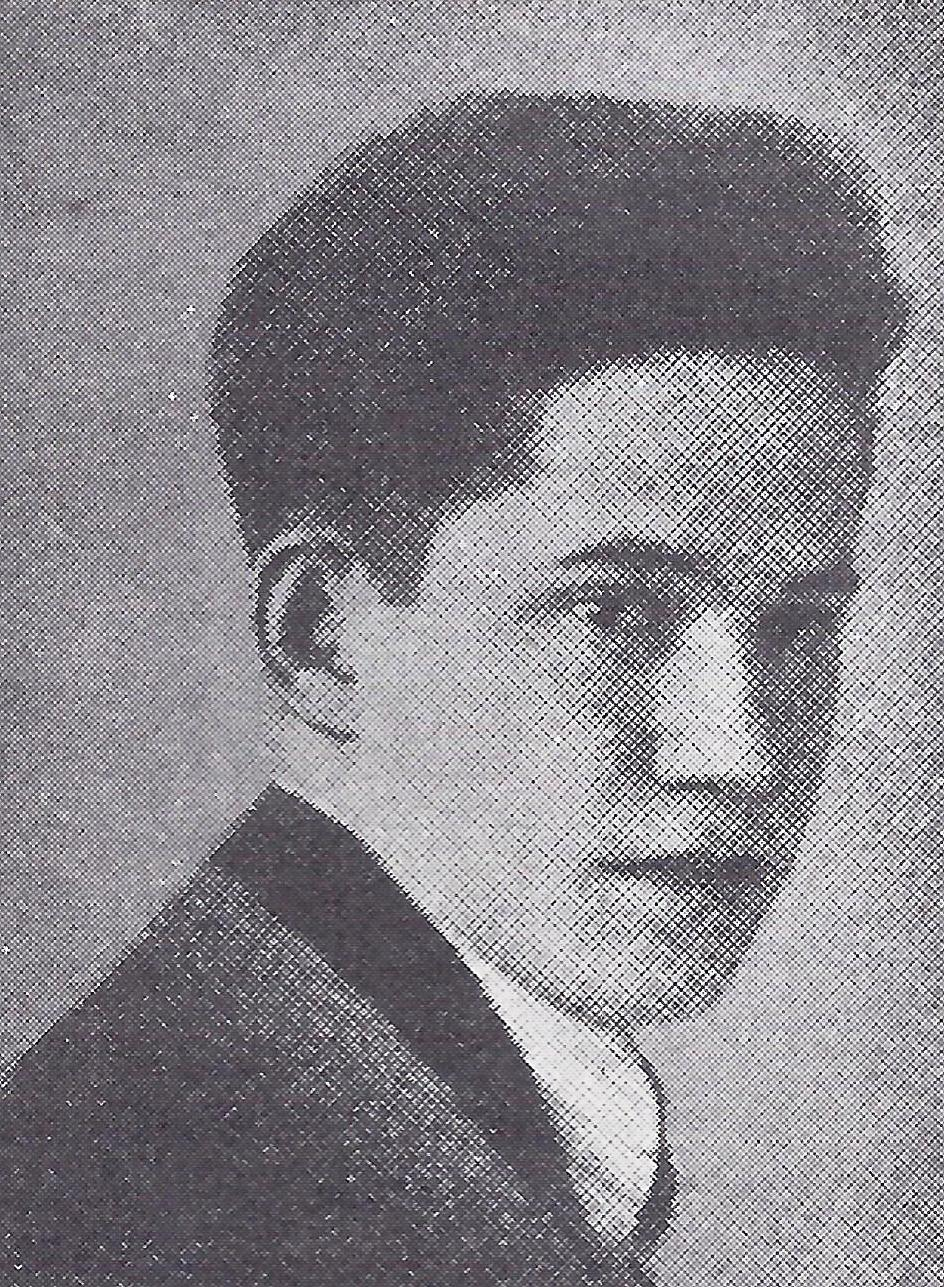
Branimir Ćosić (1903–1934)

Branimir Ćosić (Serbian: Бранимир Ћосић) (13 September 1903 – 29 January 1934) was a Serbian writer and journalist born in the village of Štitar and died in Belgrade at 31 from tuberculosis. He studied philosophy and law in Belgrade, Lausanne and Paris. Ćosić published his texts in Politika (1924), Reči i slika (1926) and Pravda (1930–1934). His parents were teachers in schools in nearby villages.

== Works ==
- Stories about Bošković, stories (1924)
- Egyptian woman and other romantic stories, stories (1927)
- As the past waters, stories (1933)
- Vicious Round, novel (1925)
- Two Kingdoms, novel (1928)
- Mown Field, novel (1933)
- Ten writers - ten conversations, interviews
